= Osamu Hosoi =

Japanese voice actor

- 細井 治
- Born: September 22, 1964 (age 61); Saitama Prefecture, Japan
- Occupation: Voice actor
- Years active: 1992–present
- Label: Arts Vision

Osamu Hosoi (細井 治, Hosoi Osamu; born September 22, 1964) is a Japanese voice actor.

== Voice roles ==
=== Anime ===
- R.O.D The TV (2003) (John Smith)
- Kurama in Elfen Lied
- Rulef and Kotokeil in Banner of the Stars
- Takehiko Aoki in Big Windup!
- Parano in Galerians: Ash
- Silvio in Absolute Obedience
- Hoshi no Kirby (Whispy Woods, Gus)
- Fumihiro in Initial D
- Graneel in Flash Hiders

=== Video games ===
- Street Fighter Zero (1995) (Dan Hibiki)
- Street Fighter Zero 2 (1996) (Dan Hibiki)
- Super Puzzle Fighter II Turbo (1996) (Dan Hibiki)
- Star Gladiator (1996) (Vector and the announcer)
- Red Earth (1996) (Hydron, Gigi)
- Street Fighter EX (1996) (Allen Snider, Garuda)
- Marvel Super Heroes vs. Street Fighter (1997) (Dan Hibiki)
- Mega Man X4 (1997) (Jet Stingray)
- Super Gem Fighter Mini Mix (1997) (Dan Hibiki)
- Street Fighter Zero 3 (1998) (Dan Hibiki)
- Street Fighter EX2 (1998) (Garuda)
- Fighting Layer (1998) (Allen Snider)
- Marvel vs. Capcom 2: New Age of Heroes (2000) (Dan Hibiki)
- Street Fighter EX3 (2000) (Garuda)
- Capcom vs. SNK: Millennium Fight 2000 (2000) (Dan Hibiki)
- Capcom vs. SNK 2 (2001) (Dan Hibiki)
- Shinobi (2002) (Homura)
- SNK vs. Capcom: SVC Chaos (2003) (Dan Hibiki)
- Capcom Fighting Jam (2004) (Hydron)
- Samurai Western (2005) (Rando Kiryu) (English/Japanese voices)
- Tales of the Abyss (2005) (Lorelei, Ginji, Aslan Frings)
- Soul Nomad & the World Eaters (2007) (Lobo)

unknown date

- The Legend of Zelda: The Wind Waker
- The Legend of Zelda: Breath of the Wild

=== Drama CDs ===
- Rock'n Baseball (Fubuki Haneda)

=== Tokusatsu Roles ===
- RR Rii & ZokuBlue in Gekisou Sentai Carranger
- Magnet Ninja Jishakkumo in Ninpuu Sentai Hurricaneger
- Sukekonoian Mashu in Tokusou Sentai Dekaranger

=== Dubbing ===
==== Live-action ====
- Monk (Jack Whitman (Nick Offerman))
- Ocean's Trilogy (Rusty Ryan (Brad Pitt))
- Thirteen (Luke (Kip Pardue))
- Wishbone

==== Animation ====
- Dora the Explorer (Miguel Márquez)
- Handy Manny (Manuel Esteviez "Manny" Garcia)
- I Got a Rocket (Professor Quigley Q)
- The Prince of Egypt (Aaron)
- WordWorld (Duck)
