= Blanka =

Street Fighter character

- Street Fighter character
- Blanka in Super Street Fighter II (1993), drawn by Bengus
- First game: Street Fighter II (1991)
- Designed by: Akira "Akiman" Yasuda and "Pigmon-san" (Street Fighter II)
- Voiced by: English: Kevin Seymour (The Animated Movie) Scott McNeil (The Animated Series) Taliesin Jaffe (2007–2021) Luis Bermudez (2022–present); Japanese: Unshō Ishizuka (The Animated Movie) Go Yamane (Street Fighter EX series) Yūji Ueda (1998–present)
- Portrayed by: Robert Mammone (The Movie film, game); Matt McCarthy (Street Fighter: Red Tape); Jason Momoa (Street Fighter film)

In-universe information
- Origin: Brazil
- Nationality: Brazilian

Blanka (/ˈblɑːŋkə/; Japanese: ブランカ), also known by his birth name Jimmy, is a character in Capcom's Street Fighter fighting game series. He first appeared in Street Fighter II (1991) as one of eight playable characters, and continued to appear in sequel and spin-off games. Blanka is also present in a number of Capcom's crossover games, including the SNK vs. Capcom series. The character has appeared in other media adaptations of the franchise, including an animated film, a live-action movie, an animated television series, a comic book and manga series.

Blanka was originally designed as a pink-skinned human character by Akira "Akiman" Yasuda. He underwent several re-conceptualizations during the production of Street Fighter II before reaching his final depiction as a feral savage with green skin and long orange hair.

Blanka's backstory is that he was once human. However, after a plane crash in Brazil, he mutated, resulting in his green coloring and his ability to generate electricity. The film Street Fighter (1994) and the 1995–1997 animated series instead depict Blanka as the same character as Charlie, Guile's former best friend, who got his powers and appearances from M. Bison's experiments: a concept disregarded by all subsequent Street Fighter video games. Blanka was generally well received by critics and fans, becoming one of the most popular characters in the franchise.

== Conception and design ==
=== Creation ===
Designed by "Pigmon-san" and Akira "Akiman" Yasuda, the concept behind Blanka emerged in an early 1988 pitch design as an African man named Anabebe who was raised by a lion. After the release of Final Fight, Capcom again approached Street Fighter II and considered several designs for the Blanka character (including a masked wrestler modeled after Tiger Mask and a ninja-style warrior). His design later changed to a large man with thick hair and sideburns, named "Hammer Blanka". The staff then adopted Blanka's feral appearance, because they felt the game would be "dull" with only human characters. After Yasuda did "rough drafts" of "a pro wrestler, [a] sumo wrestler, and a beast", he asked his team to decide which designer would finish each concept. They decided it on rock paper scissors; the "beast" was the last option and was assigned to "Pigmon-san". Blanka was originally designed with pink skin, which Yasuda considered “disgusting,” leading him to change the color to green.

=== Characteristics ===
Blanka's most prominent physical characteristic is his green color, initially attributed to his consumption of chlorophyll from plants to blend into his jungle environment. However, when Street Fighter was brought to the U.S., Blanka's coloring was attributed to his being struck by lightning during the electrical storm in which his plane crashed. In Street Fighter II, Blanka's default skin is yellowish-green; later versions of the character give the character bright green skin.

Blanka fights in a self-taught, animalistic style. In several of his special moves, he rolls into a ball, launching himself at an opponent. In Blanka's signature attack, he crouches and emits an electric current shocking anything it touches. Although Blanka growls in combat, he usually speaks with words in cutscenes, except for Street Fighter Alpha 3.

== Appearances ==
=== Video game ===
Blanka first appears in Street Fighter II, when he sees his mother (who tells his backstory) after he competes in the World Warrior tournament. According to the story, Blanka was born as a boy named Jimmy who was involved in a plane crash in the Amazon rainforest. Although in the initial games Blanka's mother says the plane crashed when he was "a little boy", the manual for Street Fighter IV says it happened when he was a baby. After the crash, he was exposed to electric eels, triggering the mutation which changed his appearance and gave him electric powers. In Street Fighter Alpha 3, a prequel to Street Fighter II, Blanka rides on a truck to civilization for the first time. After defeating Zangief, Balrog and the leader of the Shadaloo criminal organization M. Bison, Blanka joins old friend Dan Hibiki and Sakura (Dan's pupil) to destroy Bison's "psycho drive" weapon. Blanka then returns to the jungle.

In Street Fighter IV, whose events are set after Street Fighter II, Blanka, living in a town, feels out of place and decides to travel the world. At the end of the game, Dan helps his mother find him in Hong Kong. In Super Street Fighter IV, Blanka enters a worldwide tournament to be recognized by people so his mother will be proud of him. When he returns home, the townspeople visit him and he plays games with the local children. Blanka returns as a playable character in the third season of Street Fighter V: Arcade Edition, with a character story where he attempts to sell plush toys of his own likeness named Blanka-chan (Blanka-chan was also available as a skin for the character). In Street Fighter 6, Blanka has become a tour guide in the Amazon, working to support his mother. He also dons a Blanka-chan costume to make visitors believe that Blanka-chan is a jungle sprite that visits the area.

Blanka also appears in several spin-off titles. He is a playable character in the later Street Fighter EX series games (Street Fighter EX2 and Street Fighter EX3), Capcom vs. SNK, Capcom vs. SNK 2 and the home version of Street Fighter: The Movie. Blanka is a playable character by default in the PlayStation Vita version of Street Fighter X Tekken, and via downloadable content in the Xbox 360 and PlayStation 3 versions. He is a boss character in Street Fighter X Mega Man.

A cosmetic Blanka outfit has also been added to Fortnite.

=== Other media ===
==== Live-action ====
The live-action Street Fighter film combined Blanka and Charlie into one character Carlos "Charlie" Blanka. Charlie is taken captive by General M. Bison at the beginning who forces Dr. Dhalsim to subject him to genetic testing to create the perfect soldier. Blanka was played by Robert Mammone, while Kim Repia played the role in its home console video game adaptation.

Richard Ng's Uncle Richard turns into Blanka in the final action scene from the 1993 Hong Kong parody film Future Cops.

Jason Momoa played Blanka in the 2026 reboot.

==== Animation ====
Blanka briefly appears in Street Fighter II: The Animated Movie, when he is lowered from a cage and defeats Zangief in Las Vegas.

The American cartoon series retained the film's origin story for the character, as he and Guile search for a cure for his mutation.

He also makes cameo appearances in the 2012 Disney film Wreck-It Ralph, and the 2018 Steven Spielberg film Ready Player One.

==== Comics ====
In UDON's Street Fighter comic adaptation, Blanka is used as a living weapon by Shadaloo until he is rescued by Delta Red (Cammy's squad). Returning to his senses, he reunites with his mother. Blanka is an opponent faced by Ryu, Guile, and Chun-Li in the Street Fighter manga history.

== Reception ==
Blanka has been described as a fan favourite by video game media UGO Networks, IGN, GameSpot and 1UP.com, with IGN calling him "one of the most recognizable Street Fighter characters". GamesRadar said that Blanka "never quite approached Chun-Li's popularity, but has gained a strong fan following nevertheless". Sharing ninth place with Ken Masters in the Japanese magazine Gamest's 1991 best-character list; in the 1992 poll, he finished 38th. Blanka was voted 20th in Capcom's poll of 85 characters for the series' 15th anniversary. In 2008, the character was the tenth-most-popular video game character in the United Kingdom, according to a poll conducted at the London Games Festival. Although Blanka was well received by Brazilian gamers, Capcom was criticized for its depiction of Brazil. Capcom producer Yoshinori Ono, surprised when told that Blanka is popular among Brazilians, apologized for the poor impression of the country given by the character. When the Brazilian program Custe o Que Custar asked people in Spain who the best-known Brazilians were, Blanka ranked third (after Gisele Bündchen and Pelé). In 2009, after Rio de Janeiro was chosen to host the 2016 Summer Olympics, an internet meme spread making Blanka the games' unofficial mascot. A 2012 meme said that O Maior Brasileiro de Todos os Tempos, the Brazilian version of 100 Greatest Britons, had chosen Blanka the "Greatest Brazilian of All Time".

IGN ranked Blanka seventh of its "Top 25 Street Fighter Characters", noting his unique characteristics, and GameDaily placed Blanka fourth on its "Top 20 Street Fighter Characters of All Time" list. He was ranked the franchise's 17th-best character (out of 50) by UGO as initially "hook[ing]" gamers and "an indispensable part of Street Fighter now." Including Blanka on a list of "The 30 best Capcom characters of the last 30 years", GamesRadar staff said that they could include all of Street Fighter II's characters but would only choose "the wildest of the crazy characters in the game. Blanka exemplifies the special brand of insanity that made us love Capcom." Edge's James Leach called him "by far the best character" in Street Fighter II. GameSpy called Blanka one of the "25 Extremely Rough Brawlers" in video gaming, praising the brutality of his attacks. The Pittsburgh Tribune-Review described the character as resembling "some ridiculous hair-club-for-Hulks member", although his electric attacks made him an effective character. Computer and Video Games, GamesRadar and Game Revolution also noted the difficulty of fighting Blanka. Blanka has been called a "monster" and "weird", and GamesRadar said he "is a bit goofy looking in the Alpha series" (described by GameSpot as "comical"). GameDaily and GamesRadar joked about the character's "sweet" ending (in contrast to his appearance), and Empire called his ending "the worst ... in the game."
