= Dhalsim =

- Street Fighter character
- Dhalsim in Street Fighter Alpha 3
- First appearance: Street Fighter II: The World Warrior (1991)
- Created by: Akira "Akiman" Yasuda
- Designed by: Yoshiaki Ohji (preliminary); Takashi Hayashi
- Portrayed by: Roshan Seth (1994 film); Vidyut Jammwal (2026 film)
- Voiced by: English: Michael Sorich (Street Fighter II: The Animated Movie); Mike Kleinhenz (Street Fighter II V. ADV Films); Steve Blum (Street Fighter II V, Animaze); Garry Chalk (Street Fighter animated series); Christopher Bevins (2007–2021); Keith Silverstein (2022–present); Japanese: Yoshiharu Yamada (Street Fighter Zero series); Eiji Yano (SNK vs. Capcom: SVC Chaos); Shōzō Iizuka (Street Fighter II V); Daisuke Egawa (2007–present); Yukimasa Kishino (Street Fighter II: The Animated Movie); Rokurō Naya (Japanese television dub of the Street Fighter film); Toshihiko Kojima (Japanese video and DVD dub of the Street Fighter film)

In-universe information
- Fighting style: Mysteries of the Yoga
- Origin: India
- Nationality: Indian

Dhalsim (/ˈdɑːlsɪm/; Japanese: ダルシム, Hepburn: Darushimu) is a character in Capcom's Street Fighter series. He made his first appearance in Street Fighter II: The World Warrior in 1991. He sometimes goes by the alias "long-arm" and his fighting ability includes stretching his limbs. In the series, he is a mystical yogi who is loved by his villagers and family alike. He is also a pacifist who goes against his beliefs by entering the World Warrior tournament to raise money for his poor village. Throughout the series, Dhalsim is a character centered on morality and he has been noted for his other unique qualities.

== Conception and design ==
1988 Capcom considered the idea of a sequel to their Street Fighter video game, and sketched out a basic concept and roster for the game, amongst them an Indian character. Called "Great Tiger", the character appeared as a long-faced man with a turban who was able to double jump and breathe fire. While this iteration of the game was stopped in favor of working on Final Fight, when Capcom resumed work on Street Fighter II, character designer Akira "Akiman" Yasuda revisited the concept when designing the character roster. Akiman started with two concepts for the character, India and yoga, and wanted to emphasize a stereotype to further make the character memorable. Several concepts were considered, including an elephant headed design modeled after the Hindu god Ganesh. However, sprite artist Takashi Hayashi used a sketch that had been done by fellow Capcom designer Yoshiaki Ohji.

At one point in development, it was considered to give the character a cloak he would remove before battle, but this was cut due to memory limitations. Dhalsim's limbs and neck can stretch during battle to attack from range. Nishitani noted that while many comparisons were made to the Indian character in the martial arts film Master of the Flying Guillotine, he had not heard of the movie prior to working on the game and instead the concept was based on a technique from manga series JoJo's Bizarre Adventure. Akiman elaborated in a later interview, calling the technique "Zoom Punch" in reference to one used by JoJo character William A. Zeppeli. He add that originally the attack was only supposed to travel a short distance, however as development progressed Hayashi increased the length of the limbs more and more. Nishitani noted this was due to each developer wanting to make their character different than the others, and while he originally intended to shorten the length he was happy to have made it work in a balanced manner.

During the course of development, his name was "Indo" (literally "India") as a placeholder, then later Naradatta for a time. The character was finally named "Dhalsim", which according to Street Fighter II game director Akira Nishitani in an interview with Gamest magazine, comes from "Dhalsima", a martial artist from the Indian subcontinent area. However, a rumor that the name was based in part on the name of a curry restaurant near Capcom's old offices in Osaka was corroborated by Akiman in 2014.

=== Design ===
Akiman noted that sprite designers often added their own alterations to the concepts, and voiced approval for the dry, dehydrated appearance Hayashi brought to the character. Capcom producer Yoshinori Ono stated that regarding Dhalsim's appearance, "We only knew about [the rest of the world] through mostly TV and magazines", stating that when they thought of India they envisioned people "walking around as thin as skin and bones, doing yoga". When redesigning his appearance for Street Fighter V however, they felt there was a disconnect between Dhalsim's current design and how Hindu yoga practitioners were viewed, so they altered his design, adding a turban and beard as well as removing his emaciated appearance.

== Appearances ==
=== In video games ===
In his Arcade Mode ending in Street Fighter II, Dhalsim wins the tournament and returns home on his elephant Kodal. Three years later, Dhalsim's son, Datta, discovers a photograph of his father from the tournament. From the original Street Fighter II and up until Super Street Fighter II, this ending graphic was drawn in a comical style. In Super Street Fighter II Turbo, it was changed to a more realistic style, with Dhalsim's wife Sally (named Sari in the UDON comic book series) added alongside Datta.

Dhalsim would later appear in the Street Fighter Alpha sub-series in Street Fighter Alpha 2 and Street Fighter Alpha 3. In his storyline in the Alpha games (which are set prior to the events of Street Fighter II), Dhalsim attempts to hunt down an "evil spirit" (M. Bison) that is threatening the world. Dhalsim also appears in the Street Fighter EX sub-series, beginning with the console-exclusive version, Street Fighter EX Plus α, followed by Street Fighter EX2 and Street Fighter EX3. His characterization and motivation are the same as they are in the previous Street Fighter game. Dhalsim later appears in Street Fighter IV, and has also appeared as a playable character in several crossover fighting games, which include: X-Men vs. Street Fighter, Marvel Super Heroes vs. Street Fighter, Marvel vs. Capcom 2, Capcom vs. SNK, Capcom vs. SNK 2, SNK vs. Capcom: SVC Chaos and Street Fighter X Tekken. He makes a special appearance in Street Fighter X Mega Man. Dhalsim also appears as an enemy character in the Sega arcade game, Juezhan Tianhuang.

=== Gameplay ===
His fighting style is a Yoga-based style, in which Dhalsim can stretch his arms, legs, abdomen and even his neck to great lengths making him a decent long-range hand-to-hand fighter. He also uses many fire-based attacks such as Yoga Fire, Yoga Flame and Yoga Blast, the latter being an anti-air technique. His super move in the Street Fighter EX, Cross Over and later Alpha Series was the Yoga Inferno, which was a multi-hitting flamethrower-style attack that could be directed manually. Dhalsim also uses a teleportation technique known as the Yoga Teleport. In Street Fighter EX3, he gains a tag-team super move when paired with Blanka. In Street Fighter IV he uses the ultra combo move Yoga Catastrophe, as a large fireball which slowly moves toward and deals multi-damage on impact on any opponent, before using a super Yoga Inferno.

According to Akiman, Dhalsim's gameplay was meant to tie into the idea of India being "mysterious", and make them feel like totally normal activities within the "mysteries of Yoga."

=== In other media ===
==== Live-action ====
Dhalsim is portrayed by British actor Roshan Seth in 1994's live action film Street Fighter. The film depicts Dhalsim as an Indian scientist and doctor whose science was originally supposed to promote peace, only for Bison to capture him and force him to aid him in his evil ambitions, one of which is the "supersoldier" experiment meant to turn Carlos Blanka into a mutated beast. During the process, Dhalsim alters Blanka's cerebral programming to keep him gentle and is found out by the lab guard. A fight ensues, in which Dhalsim is branded with the mutagen and almost killed, but Blanka is released and saves Dhalsim by killing the guard. When Guile arrives at the base, Dhalsim directs him to confront Bison. After Bison is defeated, Dhalsim decides to remain in Bison's base along with Blanka to await its destruction, choosing to atone for his part in mutating Blanka, telling Guile that "if good men do nothing, that is evil enough". In his final scenes, Dhalsim appears bald (having had a full head of hair earlier) with three rivulets of blood running down from the top of his head, as a nod to his appearance in the games.

Simon Yam's character of Sing in the 1993 Hong Kong parody film Future Cops is based on Dhalsim as he does the poses and Yoga powers of the character. Just prior to that, Eric Kot played a parody version of the character in Wong Jing's live-action adaptation of City Hunter.

Dhalsim is played by Indian actor Vidyut Jammwal for the 2026 reboot.

==== Animation ====
In the 1993 anime Ghost Sweeper Mikami, Episode 37 there is a background character that resembles Dhalsim; the character does the trademark Yoga Fire move.

Dhalsim has a brief appearance in Street Fighter II: The Animated Movie, where he fights E. Honda in India. Though he gains the upper hand with his telekinetic abilities, he is distracted when he senses another nearby power, long enough for Honda to overpower him. He subsequently withdraws from the fight, giving Honda the victory, and apparently later points Ryu out to Honda, enabling him to give Ryu half the winnings out of gratitude.

Dhalsim is later featured in the Street Fighter animated series as part of Guile's team. From the original roster of Street Fighter II characters featured in the film, Dhalsim and T. Hawk are the only ones who do not appear as playable characters in the video game based on the film, Street Fighter. The opposite situation occurs with Akuma, who is a secret character in the game but does not appear in the film.

In the anime series Street Fighter II V, Dhalsim is a monk who lives in a remote village in India. Sagat had earlier instructed Ryu to seek Dhalsim for advice about the Ways of Hadou. Sagat had been turned down years before when he sought Dhalsim's wisdom but figured that Ryu might be found more worthy. Dhalsim is a practitioner of yoga and has some psychic abilities, and although he knows much about Hadou, he was unable to train Ryu to use the Hadouken, which was inadvertently triggered in Ryu's body during a lesson. Dhalsim is voiced by Shōzō Iizuka in the Japanese version and Steve Blum in the English dub by Animaze/Manga Entertainment.

Dhalsim also appears briefly in Street Fighter Alpha: The Animation as one of several fighters accompanying Ryu, Ken and Chun-Li to Professor Sadler's base to rescue Ryu's alleged younger brother, Shun. As the fighters demonstrate their skills to Sadler, Dhalsim fights Guy, avoiding Guy's attack by teleporting himself away to presumably strike Guy from behind. When Sadler's true intentions are revealed, Dhalsim and the other fighters are freed by Ken and Chun-Li.

==== Comics ====
In Street Fighter II V, the UDON comic book series, and Street Fighter II: The Animated Movie, Dhalsim is a wise and powerful mystic who has mastered the inner mysteries of Yoga. In the comic, he helps prepare Sagat for his bout with Ryu and helps Ryu himself discover the darkness within his soul. Later on he is given an invitation to M. Bison's "Street Fighter II" global fighting tournament, wherein he defeats Adon in the preliminaries with ease.

== Reception ==
In 1992, Dhalsim ranked at number five in the list of Best Characters of 1991 by the Gamest magazine in Japan.

Todd Ciolek of Topless Robot called him the most outlandish stereotype of Street Fighter II's cast, feeling the character was a "joke at the expense of Indian culture" and despite Capcom's claims to the contrary felt it borrowed heavily from Master of the Flying Guillotine. Sidney Fussell of Boing Boing cited Dhalsim as an example of "black magic" mystical characters occasionally being a way to enforce negative stereotypes and caricatures, and decontextualizes his religion. Gavin Jasper of Den of Geek also voiced disdain for Dhalsim in a different way, feeling that while the concept had merit, he was a "bargain basement wise man who never really does much with it" outside of a select few moments in related Street Fighter media.

The book Game Design Perspectives notes Dhalsim as an example of a "nemesis character" in video games, one difficult to master proper usage of but widely considered one of the strongest characters in the game.
