= Vega (Street Fighter) =

- Street Fighter character
- Vega in Super Street Fighter II (1993)
- First game: Street Fighter II (1991)
- Created by: Akira Nishitani; Akira "Akiman" Yasuda
- Designed by: Mizuho "Katuragi" Kageyama
- Voiced by: English: Richard Cansino (Street Fighter II: The Animated Movie, Street Fighter II, Animaze dub); Vic Mignogna (Street Fighter II V, ADV dub); Paul Dobson (TV series); Doug Erholtz (Street Fighter IV, Street Fighter X Tekken, Street Fighter V); Japanese: Eri "Erichan" Nakamura (Street Fighter II, Champion Edition, Hyper Fighting); Shō Hayami (Drama CD); Kaneto Shiozawa (Street Fighter II: The Animated Movie, Street Fighter II V, Street Fighter EX series); Yūji Ueda (Street Fighter Alpha 3, Capcom vs. SNK series); Kiyotomi Goshima (Gunspike, SVC Chaos: SNK vs. Capcom); Junichi Suwabe (Street Fighter IV, Street Fighter X Tekken, Street Fighter V); Kazuyuki Ishikawa (Street Fighter Alpha: The Animation); Nobuyuki Hiyama (Real Battle on Film); Chihara Junior (Japanese dub of Street Fighter: The Legend of Chun-Li)
- Portrayed by: Jay Tavare (Street Fighter film, game); Taboo (Legend of Chun-Li); Orville Peck (2026 film)

In-universe information
- Origin: Spain
- Nationality: Spanish
- Fighting style: Spanish Ninjutsu

Vega, also known as Balrog (Japanese: バルログ, Hepburn: Barurogu) in Japan, is a character from the Street Fighter fighting game series by Capcom. Vega is a masked claw fighter from Spain who uses a personal fighting style combining Japanese ninjutsu and Spanish bullfighting, earning him the nickname of "Spanish Ninja".

Vega debuts in Street Fighter II (1991) as the second of four boss opponents the player faces at the end of the single-player mode, a group known as the Four Devas, Grand Masters, or the Four Heavenly Kings. From Street Fighter II: Champion Edition (the second version of the game) onwards, Vega and the other three boss characters became playable. He reappears as a playable character in Street Fighter Alpha 3, Street Fighter EX2 and EX3, the Capcom vs. SNK series, SNK vs. Capcom: SVC Chaos, Street Fighter IV, Super Street Fighter IV, Street Fighter X Tekken, Ultra Street Fighter IV and Street Fighter V.

== Conception and design ==
When producing Street Fighter II, game director Akira Nishitani and character designer Akira "Akiman" Yasuda first focused on a list of countries to include fighters from in the title, and then developed each character for them. Nishitani wanted to include a ninja in the roster, however at that point in development Japan already had karate and sumo martial arts characters representing it, and the only remaining countries available to assign a fighter to were Spain and Thailand. Nishitani suggested trying to develop a Spanish ninja, something Yasuda was unsure would work and questioned if someone like that would actually exist. The concept was handed to Mizuho "Katuragi" Kageyama, where she was instructed to "draw a Spanish ninja" or alternatively "a Thai ninja." With only a two-month window between design and final content, Katuragi first focused on a Thai design, but then Akiman directed her to focus instead on a Spanish design. He pointed to Fist of the North Star as a possible inspiration, specifically a nameless masked character that appeared in it hailing from the "Lands of Asura".

Several designs followed. Vega's initial appearance consisted of a masked man in a ripped shirt with long, frizzy hair, which was followed by a heavily muscled masked man dressed as a matador with shoulder pads. A masked templar with a broadsword and cross on his chest was considered next; this design was not used, due to concerns about Western market reactions to religious imagery at the time. Another concept followed, featuring a masked ninja in a bodysuit armed with a long metal claw on his right hand, taking inspiration from a character that had previously appeared in the first Street Fighter game, Geki. At this same time, they considered fighting styles that would fit such a character and realized bullfighting could be adapted, implementing elements of a matador's appearance and technique into the character, and the claw taking the place of a matador's traditional sword. Vega's inclusion in Street Fighter Alpha 3 was the result of heavy fan requests.

Vega's finalized design is a culmination of the various concepts, appearing as a muscular half-naked matador with a snake tattoo up his right arm, a long three-pronged claw on his left, long hair in a ponytail, and a mask covering his face. In the character's backstory, the mask was reasoned as necessary to protect his face, taking inspiration from Shakespeare's portrayal of Spaniards as highly vain through his character Don Adriano de Armado in the story Love’s Labour’s Lost. They built on this further by giving him a deep hatred of visual "ugliness", with Vega valuing beauty above all else and killing what he found unsightly.

Vega was originally named "Spanish Ninja" as a placeholder during development, before being changed to "Balrog" in Japan. According to Street Fighter II director Akira Nishitani, the name was chosen due to it "sounding strong". Towards the end of development, the North American branch of Capcom voiced concerns that the game could get into legal trouble over a different character, boxer Mike Bison, due to the similarity to real life boxer Mike Tyson. As the name graphics had already been created, they chose to shuffle the names of three characters around, resulting in several characters having different names in North America: the boxer became Balrog, the game's antagonist became M. Bison, and the Spanish ninja became Vega. The team felt that the name Vega was a poor fit for the character due to his attire, but acknowledged that the risk of a lawsuit was a greater concern. The story of Street Fighter 6 acknowledged this change within the context of its narrative, claiming that all three names were aliases that Shadaloo's leadership operated under to protect their true identities.

== Appearances ==
Vega first appears in Street Fighter II: The World Warrior (1991) as an enemy and returns as a selectable character in later iterations of the game. His other major playable appearances in the Street Fighter series include Street Fighter Alpha 3 (1998) and all versions of Street Fighter IV and Street Fighter V. Other games featuring him include Street Fighter: The Movie (arcade and console versions), Street Fighter EX2, Street Fighter EX3, SNK vs. Capcom, Capcom vs. SNK, Capcom vs. SNK 2, Cannon Spike, SNK vs. Capcom: SVC Chaos, Street Fighter X Tekken, Street Fighter X Mega Man, Street Fighter: Puzzle Spirits, Super Smash Bros. Ultimate, Blood Brothers 2, Shadowverse, Teppen, Street Fighter Duel, and Street Fighter 6.

Outside of video games, Vega has been featured in live-action media, appearing in Future Cops (with Andy Lau's Ti Man based on the character), the 1994 adaptation (played by Jay Tavare), and Street Fighter: The Legend of Chun-Li (played by Taboo). In addition to animations: Street Fighter II: The Animated Movie, Street Fighter II V, Street Fighter Alpha: The Animation, and Street Fighter IV: The Ties That Bind. Other appearances include the Street Fighter II manga and Udon Entertainment's comic book series of Street Fighter.

South African country singer Orville Peck played the character in Kitao Sakurai's 2026 live-action of the game.

== Critical reception ==
IGN's D. F. Smith heavily praised the originality of the character, adding "There's never been a Street Fighter character quite like him since". GamesRadar's staff described him as one of the best Capcom characters, calling him their favorite villain from the Street Fighter series, and added that due to his character and unique gameplay, the "pretty boy Spaniard and his Wolverine-esque blades are burned into the minds of all fighting game fans". They further complained that he was underused in the series, questioning if perhaps he was "too creepy" for fighting game fans. Gavin Jasper of Den of Geek ranked him highly on their list of Street Fighter characters, stating "Few people in this world have ever had their shit figured out more than Vega", noting how the character was contradictory in many ways, including that he "has his own personal sense of honor, but in a disgusting, self-serving, prejudice way". He further added that while he had a hard time playing as Vega, he praised how well the character's gameplay was done, and was elated when a version of Street Fighter II was released that made him playable. Eric Van Allen and Suriel Vazquez of Paste noted "His womanizing character can be a little tired at times, but his style is second-to-none with his mask-and-claw combo", and called him easily one of the series' most memorable villains.

In a retrospective of Street Fighter II, a writer for Retromaniac discussed his fascination with the character, due to his own kinship as a Spaniard and the different aspects of his character, such as his claw and mask which his young mind mentally likened to Freddy Krueger and Jason Voorhees respectively. He added that even after he discovered the character's actual identity "This amalgam of sensations, evidently influenced by the blessed pop culture references at the time, gave a special aura to Vega". According to Marcos Codas of Dread Central, Vega is a special character whose defining traits stem from his tragic background. Born into Spanish nobility, Vega's personality change is caused by the loss of his mother at the hands of his violent stepfather—a post traumatic stress disorder (PTSD) that fuels both his inner anger and his capacity for ruthless combat. His slender build, long flowing hair, distinctive mask, and razor-sharp claw not only establish a striking visual identity but also embody his commitment to beauty in battle. Through an acrobatic fighting style, Vega challenged the hyper-masculine archetypes prevalent in 1990s video games, ultimately emerging as a pioneering figure in the realm of video game representation and redefining cultural expectations of what it means to be a Hispanic man.
