= Street Fighter (2026 film) =

2026 film by Kitao Sakurai

- Theatrical release poster
- Directed by: Kitao Sakurai
- Screenplay by: T. J. Fixman; Kitao Sakurai
- Story by: Dalan Musson; Gary Dauberman
- Based on: Street Fighter by Capcom
- Produced by: Mary Parent; Cale Boyter; Jason Momoa; Takayuki Nakayama; Stefan Makhoul
- Starring: Noah Centineo; Andrew Koji; Callina Liang; Joe "Roman Reigns" Anoa'i; David Dastmalchian; Cody Rhodes; Eric André; Andrew Schulz; Vidyut Jammwal; Orville Peck; Don Lee; Curtis "50 Cent" Jackson; Jason Momoa
- Cinematography: Ken Seng
- Edited by: James Thomas; Delaney Del Vecchio
- Music by: Leo Birenberg; Zach Robinson
- Production companies: Legendary Pictures; Capcom
- Distributed by: Paramount Pictures
- Release dates: October 12, 2026 (Grauman's Chinese Theatre); October 16, 2026 (United States)
- Running time: 121 minutes
- Countries: United States; Japan
- Language: English
- Budget: $82 million
- Box office: $102.5 million

Street Fighter is a 2026 martial arts film directed by Kitao Sakurai and written by Sakurai and T. J. Fixman, with a story by Dalan Musson and Gary Dauberman. It is the third live-action feature-length film based on the Street Fighter video game series by Capcom.

Callina Liang plays the martial artist Chun-Li, who recruits the fighters Ryu (Andrew Koji) and Ken Masters (Noah Centineo) to join a tournament and confront the dictator M. Bison (David Dastmalchian). Joe "Roman Reigns" Anoa'i, Cody Rhodes, Eric André, Andrew Schulz, Vidyut Jammwal, Orville Peck, Don Lee, Curtis "50 Cent" Jackson and Jason Momoa co-star.

Legendary Entertainment acquired the live-action film and television rights to Street Fighter in April 2023, by which point the film had entered active development, with Capcom co-producing. Danny and Michael Philippou were announced as directors before dropping out in June 2024, with Sakurai joining the following February. Casting took place between May and June 2025. Principal photography began in August 2025 and ended in November.

Street Fighter premiered on October 12, 2026, at the Grauman's Chinese Theatre in Los Angeles, and was theatrically released in the United States by Paramount Pictures on October 16. It received mixed reviews and has grossed $101 million worldwide on an $82 million production budget.

== Plot ==
In 1987, Japanese-born Ryu defeats Sagat in the first World Warrior tournament using Satsui no Hadou (Dark Hadou), attracting the attention of the demon Akuma. Shortly afterward, Akuma murders his older brother and Ryu's mentor, Gouken, to provoke Ryu into unleashing his Dark Hadou. The incident drives Ryu and his adoptive brother, Ken Masters, apart, and Ryu disappears from the martial arts world.

Six years later, M. Bison, dictator of Shadaloo, organizes the second World Warrior tournament in Metrolao City to draw Ryu out of hiding. Chun-Li, an undercover Interpol agent seeking revenge for her father's murder at Bison's hands, recruits Ryu, Ken, and other fighters from around the world. Ryu initially declines to participate, but Akuma threatens to destroy the tournament's winner unless Ryu enters. Fearing that Ken will win, Ryu travels to Metrolao to dissuade his brother, who refuses to listen. Ryu defeats E. Honda to take his place in the tournament. The night before the competition, the fighters brawl in a bar before Bison's soldiers incapacitate them and take Ryu to Bison's spire.

During the tournament, Vega defeats Guile, while Ken defeats boxer Balrog. At the spire, Bison offers Ryu a position in his empire. When Ryu refuses, Bison forces him to fight Blanka in prison while using a device to extract his fighting power. Unable to avoid the confrontation, Ryu unleashes a Hadouken that destroys the prison walls and overloads the device, allowing Blanka to escape.

Before his next match, Ken learns from Chun-Li about Bison's plans for Ryu. After defeating Dhalsim in the semifinals, Ken abandons the tournament to rescue his brother, but both are captured. Ken awakens to find Ryu strapped to the extraction device. As Bison activates it, Blanka breaks into the room and frees Ryu. Meanwhile, Chun-Li confronts Bison in his office. He sends Vega and his bodyguard Juli to fight her, but she defeats both before Bison incapacitates her with his Psycho Crusher attack.

Reunited, Ryu and Ken argue over their estrangement. Ryu confesses to Ken that he had destroyed his invitation to the first tournament out of jealousy because Ken was growing to be stronger than him. This makes Ken angry, causing him to fight Ryu. The brothers battle until Ryu defeats Ken with a Hadouken.

Back at the tournament, kickboxer Joe is declared the champion after Ken fails to appear. True to his promise, Akuma arrives and easily kills Joe before confronting Ryu. Overwhelmed by Akuma, Ryu transforms into his corrupted persona, Dark Ryu, (Note: As per promotional material, the persona is known as "Dark Ryu" in this film, in contrast to "Evil Ryu" as in the games.) and defeats Akuma. Ken, Chun-Li, and Ken's manager, Dan Hibiki, attempt to stop Ryu, but he proves too powerful. Ken ultimately incapacitates him with a Flaming Hadouken, which he unleashes for the first time, restoring Ryu to normal.

Bison orders Cammy and his troops to retrieve Akuma's body. Cammy destroys Chun-Li's van with a rocket launcher, preventing the heroes from pursuing them. The following day, Ryu, Ken, Chun-Li, and Dan leave Shadaloo with Guile and Dhalsim providing transportation, the group deciding to work together to take down Bison. Meanwhile, a scarred Sagat receives a visit from Bison and his remaining lieutenants.

== Cast ==
- Noah Centineo as Ken Masters
- Andrew Koji as Ryu / Dark Ryu
- Callina Liang as Chun-Li
- Joe "Roman Reigns" Anoa'i as Akuma
- David Dastmalchian as M. Bison
- Cody Rhodes as Guile
- Andrew Schulz as Dan Hibiki
- Eric André as Don Sauvage
- Vidyut Jammwal as Dhalsim
- Orville Peck as Vega
- Don Lee as Gouken
- Kyle Mooney as Marvin
- Curtis "50 Cent" Jackson as Balrog
- Jason Momoa as Blanka
- Olivier Richters as Zangief
- Hirooki Goto as E. Honda
- Mel Jarnson as Cammy
- Rayna Vallandingham as Juli
- Alexander Volkanovski as Joe

Other characters from the games include El Fuerte, portrayed by Christian Valle, and Sagat via animation in the prologue and mid-credits scene. Cameos throughout the film consists of streamers Maximilian "Maximilian Dood" Miles Christiansen, LazarBeam, Lachlan, and Bubbell, professional fighting game players Justin Wong and Michael "Yipes" Mendoza, artist BossLogic and internet personality Nathan Lust as Bison's inmates and filmmaker brothers Danny and Michael Philippou, who were originally signed to direct, as fictionalized versions of themselves.

== Production ==
=== Development ===
In April 2023, Legendary Entertainment purchased the live-action film and television rights to the Street Fighter video game series by Capcom; it would be the third live-action adaptation, following Street Fighter (1994) and Street Fighter: The Legend of Chun-Li (2009). The brothers Danny and Michael Philippou were in talks to direct. In June 2024, they dropped out to direct Bring Her Back (2025). In February 2025, Kitao Sakurai was hired to direct.

=== Casting ===
Noah Centineo, Andrew Koji, Jason Momoa, Roman Reigns, Orville Peck and Callina Liang were cast in June 2025. Shortly thereafter, 50 Cent confirmed that he had been cast as Balrog, and Andrew Schulz joined as Dan Hibiki. In July, David Dastmalchian, Cody Rhodes, Hirooki Goto, and Vidyut Jammwal joined as M. Bison, Guile, E. Honda, and Dhalsim. In September, Eric André, Olivier Richters, Mel Jarnson, Rayna Vallandingham, Alexander Volkanovski and Kyle Mooney were announced. Near the film's release in October 2026, Don Lee was announced as the voice of Gouken in animated flashback sequences.

Liv Morgan was reportedly in consideration for the role of Cammy and had even met with Legendary Pictures' executive producer Cale Boyter on multiple occasions, however a tricep tear at the time proved to be an issue in regard to performing stunt work and travelling to Australia for filming.

To prepare for her role as Chun-Li, Liang trained daily in Taekwondo, Muay Thai, and Wushu for approximately two hours, focusing on leg strength. She adopted a rigorous bulking diet that involved consuming 12 eggs per day and eating every two hours, which she said made her nauseated. By the end of filming, each of her thighs had increased in size by 6.5 centimeters (2.6 in).

In the Japanese-dubbed version, Hiroki Takahashi voices Ryu, Yuji Kishi as Ken, Fumiko Orikasa as Chun-Li, Taketora as Akuma, Taiten Kusunoki as M. Bison, Hiroki Yasumoto as Guile, Toshiyuki Kusuda as Dan, Daisuke Egawa as Dhalsim, Junichi Suwabe as Vega, Kenta Miyake as Zangief, Yoshikazu Nagano as Edmond Honda, Kumi Tanaka as Yuri, Miyuki Sawashiro as Cammy, Satoshi Tsuruoka as Balrog, and Yuji Ueda as Blanka—the original voice cast as of Street Fighter 6 reprised their respective roles.

=== Filming and post-production ===
Principal photography began in Australia on August 18, 2025, under the working title Punch, with Ken Seng as the cinematographer. Filming wrapped on November 12. The visual effects were provided by Digital Domain, DNEG, Framestore, Niche VFX and Od Studios!, with Sandra Balej as visual effects supervisor. Titmouse, Inc. created the animated flashback sequences.

== Music ==
Leo Birenberg and Zach Robinson composed the score, having previously collaborated with Sakurai on the Twisted Metal series. The film also includes two original songs by the band Health: "Negative Edge" and "Brainrot". The soundtrack album was released digitally by Milan Records on October 16, 2026.

== Marketing ==
On February 2, 2026, Legendary appointed Hasbro as the global master toy licensee for the film. A graphic novel anthology would be published by Legendary Comics featuring five stories set before the events of the film. One of the stories featuring Bison would be written by David Dastmalchian who portrays him in the film. A crowdfunding campaign was launched on September 9, 2026, on Kickstarter.

== Release ==
Street Fighter premiered on October 12, 2026, at the Grauman's Chinese Theatre in Los Angeles, and was theatrically released in the US by Paramount Pictures on October 16, 2026, in IMAX. It was originally scheduled for March 20, 2026, by Sony Pictures Releasing as part of their previous deal with Legendary, but was taken off the schedule less than a year before its release, after Legendary's deal with Sony expired in November 2024. In August 2025, Paramount was in talks to distribute after signing a deal with Legendary. In September, they gained distribution rights.

== Reception ==
=== Box office ===
As of November 19, 2026, Street Fighter has grossed $59.3 million in the United States and Canada, and $41.7 million in other territories, for a worldwide total of $101 million.

In the United States and Canada, it was released alongside Whalefall, You Can See Everything, and Sense and Sensibility, and was projected to gross $25–35 million from 3,575 theaters in its opening weekend. It made $13 million on its first day, and went on to debut to $31 million, topping the box office. In its second weekend, the film earned $8.6 million (a drop of 72%), finishing in fourth place.

=== Critical response ===
On the review aggregation website Rotten Tomatoes, 42% of 148 critics' reviews are positive, with an average rating of 4.9/10. The website's consensus reads: "The latest iteration of Street Fighter has plenty of affection for its source material and doesn't lack for dizzying style, but its incoherent storytelling and juvenile humor make for a disappointing regression among video game adaptations." Metacritic, which uses a weighted average, assigned Street Fighter a score of 43 out of 100, based on 28 critics, indicating "mixed or average" reviews. Audiences polled by CinemaScore gave it an average grade of "B–" on an A+ to F scale. It received a 65% definite recommend for children under 12. The audience was 30% Latino and Hispanic, 29% Caucasian, 21% Black, 14% Asian American and 6% Native American or Other.

Brandon Yu of The New York Times wrote that "Street Fighter has a sturdy enough script to bear the load, even if it buckles a bit by the end" and credited its cast and the "punchy pyrotechnics of its fight sequences" as some of its strengths. Frank Scheck of The Hollywood Reporter found it "only sporadically entertaining" and criticized its plot and "ensemble of varying effectiveness". Variety's Siddhant Adlakha said Street Fighter was "consistently funny" but "becomes disastrously scattered, between setups and payoffs at complete odds, confounding ADR, and a total lack of any actual conclusion". Jake Kleinman for Polygon said it was "one of the sloppiest, cringiest, and most incoherent films of the year". Though he praised some performances, such as those of David Dastmalchian and Cody Rhodes, he criticized Liang's "dramatic performance that feels out of place when she's going up against Dastmalchian’s zany energy".

Jake Coyle of the Associated Press called Street Fighter a step backward for video game adaptations, writing that its "retrograde vibe — complete with leering shots of Liang's body — feels all the more out of step coming on the heels of more ambitious video game adaptations like Zach Cregger's Resident Evil". Tom Jorgensen of IGN praised the performances of the fighters, including Liang, Rhodes, and Peck, and the comedians Eric André and Andrew Schulz, who Jorgensen called a "big surprise". He felt that Street Fighter was "dumber than a box of rocks ... [but] can be pretty fun with the right combination of enthusiastic friends and anarchic spirit".

== Future ==
In October 2026, Sakurai said a sequel was being written, with its development depending on audience reception. Centineo campaigned for his friend Rachel Zegler to play Eliza, Ken's girlfriend and later wife, and the cast all signed for three more films.

== See also ==
- List of films based on video games
