= Street Fighter EX2 =

1998 video game

- Arcade flyer
- Developer: Arika
- Publisher: Capcom: PAL: Virgin Interactive (PS)
- Director: Akira Nishitani
- Designers: Shinzi Watanabe; Hiroshi Okuda; Kiminori Tsubouchi
- Programmers: Hiroyasu Hashidate; Akira Kurabayashi
- Composers: Takayuki Aihara; Shinji Hosoe; Ayako Saso
- Series: Street Fighter
- Platforms: Arcade (EX2 & EX2 Plus), PlayStation (EX2 Plus)
- Release: Arcade (EX2): JP: May 1998; NA: May 26, 1998; (EX2 Plus): JP: June 11, 1999; NA: June 29, 1999; PlayStation (EX2 Plus): JP: December 24, 1999; NA: May 25, 2000; EU: June 2, 2000
- Genre: Fighting
- Modes: Single-player, multiplayer
- Arcade system: Sony ZN-2

Street Fighter EX2 (Note: Japanese: ストリートファイターEX2, Hepburn: Sutorīto Faitā EX Tsū) is a 1998 fighting game co-produced by Capcom and Arika and originally released as a arcade game for the Sony ZN-2 hardware. It is the sequel to the original Street Fighter EX, and the second spin-off game of the Street Fighter series. An updated version of the game titled Street Fighter EX2 Plus was released in 1999 in arcades as well and subsequently ported to the PlayStation the same year. Its sequel, Street Fighter EX3, was released in 2000.

== Gameplay ==
The original version of Street Fighter EX2 retains all of the features from the previous game, Street Fighter EX Plus, including original features such as "Guard Breaks" (unique moves which cannot be blocked by an opponent) and "Super Canceling" (the ability to cancel a Super Combo into another Super Combo).

The primary new feature in the game are "Excel Combos", ("excel" being an abbreviation for "extra cancel"). Much like the "Custom Combos" featured in the Street Fighter Alpha series, Excel Combos allows player to connect a series of basic and special moves for a limited time. During an Excel Combo, the player begins with a basic move and can follow up with a different basic move or follow-up a basic move with a special move, which can be followed by a different special move. However, the player cannot connect any move with the same move, nor is it possible to cancel special moves into basic moves during an Excel Combo.

== Characters ==
Recurring Street Fighter characters Ryu, Ken, Chun-Li, Zangief, and Guile, all of whom were in the original Street Fighter EX, return in EX2, along with original characters Hokuto, Doctrine Dark, Skullomania, and Cracker Jack. Dhalsim, who was in Street Fighter EX Plus α, also returns along with four additional characters new to the EX series: Blanka and Vega from Street Fighter II, along with new characters Sharon (a redheaded female special agent) and Hayate (a Japanese swordsman). Allen Snider, Blair Dame, Darun Mister, Pullum Purna and M. Bison were omitted from the original version of Street Fighter EX2, although Darun, Pullum and M. Bison would later return in Street Fighter EX2 Plus, while Allen and Blair would be featured in an unrelated 1998 Arika-developed arcade fighting game, Fighting Layer. Street Fighter character Sakura Kasugano was omitted from EX2 games, but returned in the sequel Street Fighter EX3.

The game also features four hidden characters: Kairi, from the original EX, returns as a hidden character, along with new characters Shadow Geist (a costumed vigilante similar to Skullomania) and Nanase (Hokuto and Kairi's sister, a young girl who wields a staff). Garuda, from the original EX, returns as a boss character. All four characters can be selected by the player after meeting certain requirements.

== Versions ==
A gameplay image of Street Fighter EX2 Plus

=== Arcade ===
Street Fighter EX2 Plus, an enhanced version of Street Fighter EX2, was released in arcades on June 11, 1999. EX2 Plus retains all of the characters from the original version except for Hayate (who was removed from the arcade version). M. Bison, Darun, and Pullum Purna, who were all excluded from the original Street Fighter EX2, return in EX2 Plus. Sagat makes his debut in the EX series in EX2 Plus along with new characters Vulcano Rosso (an Italian martial artist) and Area (a young girl equipped with a large mechanical right arm), whereas Nanase is now a regular character. A non-selectable version of M. Bison named "Bison II" appears in the game as a secret final opponent in single-player mode.

In addition to the Super Combos and Excel Combos in the original EX2, EX2 Plus also features "Meteor Combos", more powerful versions of Super Combos which can only be performed filling up all three stocks of the Super Combo gauge. While the previous EX games featured characters who had Lv.3-only Super Combos, it became a standard feature for all of the characters in EX2 Plus, with each character having at least one Meteor Combo. The Excel Combo system from the original EX2 was also revised slightly. The player can now connect a basic move or a special move into the same move instead of being limited to a different move.

=== Home ===
The home console version of Street Fighter EX2 Plus for the PlayStation was released in December 1999. The PlayStation version features arcade, versus, and practice modes, along with an all new "Director mode" and a satellite-smashing "bonus game", and also includes Hayate from the original EX2 as a secret character.

== Soundtrack ==
Like the previous game, the music was written by former Namco composers Takayuki Aihara, Shinji Hosoe, and Ayako Saso. A soundtrack CD was released on June 18, 1998 by Scitron.

Soundtrack album track list
1. Street Fighter EX2
2. Select
3. Pearl in the Sky
4. White Field
5. The Infinite Earth
6. Lost Sea
7. Mahatma Temple with Hymn
8. Three Tree
9. Crowded Town
10. Flash Train
11. Fake World
12. Crash Power Plant
13. Amusementive Crime 2
14. More Stronger
15. Passage of Lotus (Kairi's theme)
16. Ending
17. Staff Roll
18. Continue
19. Stage Clear
20. Challenger
21. Game Over
22. Street Fighter EX
23. Sakura Mankai (Hokuto)
24. Precious Heart (Sakura)
25. Heat Wind (Dhalsim)
26. Garnet Sky (Jack)
27. Stronger (Garuda)
28. Spinning Bird (Chun-Li)
29. Arabesque (Pullum)
30. God Hands (Akuma)
31. Future Objects (Cycloid Beta)

A 13-track arranged album was also released on July 23, 1998 by Suleputer, with arrangements by the original composers, along with Yasunori Mitsuda and Toshimichi Isoe.

== Reception ==
Reception

Review scores
| Publication | Score |
|---|---|
| Famitsu | 31/40 |
| GameSpot | 7.6/10 |
| PlayStation: The Official Magazine | 3/5 |
| Electric Playground | 8.5/10 |
| Irish Player | 8.4/10 |
| Next Level Gaming | 4/6 |
| PSX Extreme | 9.3/10 |
| PSX Nation | 92% |

In Japan, Game Machine listed Street Fighter EX2 on their July 1, 1998 issue as being the most-successful arcade game of the month.

GameSpot praised the new characters and the graphics, but complained about the static ending sequences, as well as the lack of originality or new features. PSX Extreme stated that "When I take a look at SNK's cheap and blurry Fatal Fury: Wild Ambition and compare it to Capcom's Street Fighter EX 2 Plus, I see garbage and then I see one of the most polished looking fighting games to date, and obviously I am talking about EX2." They went on to summarize the game as "one of the most enhanced and entertaining Street Fighters ever".
