= Nool =

Nool may refer to:

- Nool - a Social Media app for personal growth and conversations within goal-based communities
- NOOL - An online library offering multi-lingual books
- Nool or Hydron, an enemy character from Red Earth
- Jungle of Nool, a fictional place in Horton Hears a Who!

== People with the surname ==
- Erki Nool, decathlon gold medalist

== See also ==
- Arul Nool, a holy script of Ayyavazhi
