= Street Fighter EX3 =

2000 video game

- North American box art
- Developer: Arika
- Publisher: Capcom
- Director: Akira Nishitani
- Producer: Tatsuya Minami
- Designers: Hiroshi Okuda; Kiminori Tsubouchi
- Composers: Shinji Hosoe; Ayako Saso; Takayuki Aihara; Yasuhisa Watanabe
- Series: Street Fighter EX
- Engine: RenderWare
- Platform: PlayStation 2
- Release: JP: March 4, 2000; NA: October 26, 2000; EU: March 2, 2001
- Genre: Fighting
- Modes: Single-player, multiplayer

Street Fighter EX3 is a 2000 fighting video game developed by Arika and published by Capcom. The game was first released on March 4, 2000 in Japan as a launch title exclusively for the PlayStation 2, making it the first game in the Street Fighter series to be released on the console. It is the third and final console installment in the Street Fighter EX series. Arika released a spiritual successor to the game and series in 2018, called Fighting EX Layer.

== Gameplay ==
=== Mechanics ===
Street Fighter EX3 is a 2D head-to-head fighting game with 3D graphics. It features a similar gameplay system to its predecessor Street Fighter EX2 Plus, with characters being able to pull off similar moves like Super Combos and Meteor Combos. However, a difference here is that the "Guard Break" system from the previous installments has been removed and replaced with a similar system called the "Surprise Blow" ("Hard Attack" in Japan), which does not use up energy stored in "super bars," although the attack can be blocked (only when standing).

Other additions are the "Critical Parade" (calling out a tag-partner to simultaneously battle your opponent for a limited time) and "Momentary Combo" (following a special attack with another). Some characters received new moves, such as Skullomania having a vertical projectile.

The core gameplay is essentially the same as previous installments. However, Street Fighter EX3 features Tag Battles, similar to Tekken Tag Tournament, allowing players to switch between characters and offering greater combination possibilities.

=== Modes ===
In Original Mode, the player can recruit a team of up to four characters that were the last to be defeated by the end of the level, and can choose the next opponent(s), as is possible in Street Fighter III. The bonus stage is a simplified version of the beat 'em up genre. In this mode, there are also missions, which the player can complete in order to gain Platinum, Gold, Silver, and Bronze trophies, which in turn unlock various features.

In Arena Mode, Dramatic Battles are possible, with 2-VS-2, 1-VS-3 (similarly to Battle 1 in Original Mode), or even 2-VS-1 (similarly to Battle 3 in Original Mode, if with a partner) with flexibility via a multitap over each character being controlled by human or computer. Original mode uses new music based on the background stage, while the VS and Team Battle modes reuse themes from earlier games, which are based on the chosen characters.

In Character Edit Mode, the player can complete a series of challenges with the new character, Ace, and earn experience points, which can then be used to obtain new Special Moves and Super Combos for Ace, which can then be applied to him to create a custom move list. A configuration example would be the Shoryuken, Sonic Boom, and Spinning Piledriver, as used by Seth in Street Fighter IV. Ace is also playable in the other available game modes.

== Characters ==
Multiple costumes are available for each character, depending on the button used on the character in the Character Select screen.

Default characters

- Ryu
- Ken
- Chun-Li
- Guile
- Zangief
- Dhalsim
- Blanka
- Sakura
- Vega (Balrog in Japan)
- Doctrine Dark
- Hokuto / Bloody Hokuto (Chi no Fūin Tokareta Hokuto in Japan)
- Cracker Jack
- Skullomania
- Sharon
- Nanase
- Ace

Unlockable characters

- M. Bison (Vega in Japan)
- Sagat
- Garuda
- Shadow Geist
- Kairi
- Vulcano Rosso
- Area
- Pullum Purna
- Darun Mister

Hidden characters

- Evil Ryu (Satsui no Hadō ni Mezameta Ryū in Japan)
- Bison II (Vega II in Japan)

CPU-controlled

- Shin-Bison (True Vega in Japan, only playable through the use of a cheat device)

Ace (エース, Ēsu), introduced in this game, is a government agent ordered by the prime minister of his nation to find information about a secret weapon being developed in an underground base. Ace uses a custom fighting style, which the player can edit by passing a series of trials in the game's Character Edit mode. He was designed originally with the idea of implementing a side-scrolling action game mode into the title.

== Reception ==
Reception

Aggregate score
| Aggregator | Score |
|---|---|
| Metacritic | 65/100 |

Review scores
| Publication | Score |
|---|---|
| AllGame | 3/5 |
| CNET Gamecenter | 7/10 |
| Edge | 7/10 |
| Electronic Gaming Monthly | 6.67/10 (Note: Three critics of Electronic Gaming Monthly gave the game each a score of 6.5/10, 7.5/10, and 6/10.) |
| EP Daily | 6/10 |
| Famitsu | 9/10, 8/10, 8/10, 7/10 |
| Game Informer | 6/10 |
| GameFan | (G.N.) 84% (JP) 78% (Note: In GameFan's viewpoint of the Japanese import, three critics gave it each a score of 81, 83, and 71.) (US) 77% (Note: In GameFan's viewpoint of the game, three critics gave it each a score of 73, 71, and 88.) |
| GameSpot | 7.4/10 |
| IGN | 5/10 |
| Next Generation | 1/5 |
| Official U.S. PlayStation Magazine | 3.5/5 |
| Maxim | 3/5 |

Street Fighter EX3 received "mixed" reviews according to the review aggregation website Metacritic. Maxim gave it a mixed review almost two weeks before the PlayStation 2 launch.

Jeff Gerstmann of GameSpot complained in his review of the Japanese import that the character animation is unimproved from Street Fighter EX2 and found the frequent sound changes jarring, but liked the sound effects and the bonus touches to the gameplay such as the stage which plays during the credits. He commented, "The tag-team fighting adds a nice new element that the previous game totally lacked. EX3 may feel a bit rushed in some spots, but overall it's a fun and great-looking fighting game that won't disappoint longtime EX fans." Chester "Chet" Barber of NextGen said of the game, "The EX series has always fallen short of the quality of many of the 2D Street Fighter games. However, if you're a fan, you probably won't be able to stop yourself from checking it out." Uncle Dust of GamePro said of the game, "When it comes down to it, this is just a prettier version of the PlayStation's EX series, but it's not pretty enough to make up for its so-so combat. Street Fighter fanatics will have fun with it on their PlayStation 2, but the SF series is much better in 2D on the Dreamcast." (Note: GamePro gave the game 4/5 for graphics, 3/5 for sound, 4.5/5 for control, and 3.5/5 for fun factor.)

In its week of release, the game made the top 10 in the Japanese sales charts, with 207,000 units.
