= Capcom vs. SNK: Millennium Fight 2000 =

2000 video game

- Japanese arcade flyer
- Developer: Capcom Production Studio 1
- Publishers: WW: Capcom; PAL: Virgin Interactive (DC)
- Producer: Yoshihiro Sudo
- Designer: Hideaki Itsuno
- Artists: Kinu Nishimura; Shinkiro; Daigo Ikeno
- Composer: Satoshi Ise
- Series: SNK vs. Capcom
- Platforms: Arcade, Dreamcast, PlayStation
- Release: August 2000: Arcade; JP: August 2000; NA: October 2000; JP: June 2001 (Pro) Dreamcast; JP: September 6, 2000; NA: November 8, 2000; EU: December 15, 2000; JP: June 14, 2001 (Pro) PlayStation (Pro); JP: April 18, 2002; EU: July 12, 2002; NA: August 13, 2002
- Genre: Fighting
- Modes: Single-player, multiplayer
- Arcade system: Sega NAOMI

Capcom vs. SNK: Millennium Fight 2000, (Note: Japanese: カプコン バーサス エス・エヌ・ケイ ミレニアムファイト 2000, Hepburn: Kapukon Bāsasu Es-Enu-Kei Mireniamu Faito Nisen) also known as simply Capcom vs. SNK in international releases, is a 2000 crossover fighting game developed and published by Capcom for arcades on Sega's NAOMI hardware and later ported to the Dreamcast. It is the second game in the SNK vs. Capcom series and the first game in the series to be released for the arcade.

A revised version, Capcom vs. SNK Pro, was released the following year, followed shortly thereafter by a sequel, Capcom vs. SNK 2: Mark of the Millennium 2001.

The arcade version of Capcom vs. SNK Pro was re-released in 2025 as part of Capcom Fighting Collection 2.

== Gameplay ==
Capcom vs. SNK uses a "ratio" system, where the "ratio" is a rating of a character's overall strength, ranging from 1 to 4. Teams of up to four can be assembled, but their combined ratios must equal and go no higher than 4. The gameplay uses the SNK-style four-button format. The player can also choose their "groove", or attack meter. The SNK Groove is based on the Extra mode that was used from The King of Fighters '94 to The King of Fighters '98, while the Capcom Groove is based on the gameplay system from the Street Fighter Alpha series.

== Plot ==
=== Prologue ===
In 2000, a special martial arts event is planned through a collaboration of the two most powerful world organizations: the Garcia Financial Clique and the Masters Foundation. The gala event – it is hoped by everyone – will ease the political conflicts between the two powers. The competition was named "Millennium Fight 2000".

Many martial artists have registered for the tournament. People around the world focus intensely on the upcoming exhibitions, making the long-awaited opening ceremony a huge success.

=== Playable characters ===
==== Capcom characters ====
- Akuma
- Balrog
- Blanka
- Cammy
- Chun-Li
- Dan Hibiki (Note: Added in Capcom vs. SNK Pro)
- Dhalsim
- E. Honda
- Evil Ryu
- Guile
- Ken Masters
- M. Bison
- Morrigan Aensland
- Ryu
- Sagat
- Sakura Kasugano
- Vega
- Zangief

==== SNK characters ====
- Benimaru Nikaido
- Geese Howard
- Iori Yagami
- Joe Higashi
- Kim Kaphwan
- King
- Kyo Kusanagi
- Mai Shiranui
- Nakoruru
- Orochi Iori
- Raiden
- Rugal Bernstein
- Ryo Sakazaki
- Ryuji Yamazaki
- Terry Bogard
- Vice
- Yuri Sakazaki

== Production ==
Kyo Kusanagi's pixel art was originally created by Hiraki, who, despite leaving SNK to work on another project a few years later, was asked by Capcom's Kaname Fujioka to once again work on Kyo's design for the crossover game. Capcom wanted Rock Howard in the game, but the Garou: Mark of the Wolves team refused, saying, he should first developed in his own series, Fatal Fury. Among the SNK characters, Ryo Sakazaki from Art of Fighting has been compared with Ryu from Street Fighter as result of having the same creators. This is addressed in a special demo is provided when fighting Ryu, each player jumps back from the center of the screen to create distance as a tribute to the first Art of Fighting. Leon S. Kennedy and Mega Man were also intended to be playable characters but were cut to focus more on fighting game characters.

An updated version of the original Capcom vs. SNK titled Capcom vs. SNK Pro was released on the Arcade Sega NAOMI GD-ROM hardware (2000), Dreamcast (2001) and PlayStation (2002), the latter suffering from slight load times between rounds and downgraded graphics and sound due to hardware limitations. New additions included Joe Higashi (from Fatal Fury) and Dan Hibiki (from Street Fighter Alpha), new moves for existing characters, and new modes of play. Capcom vs. SNK Pro was only ported to the Dreamcast in Japan, while the PlayStation port was made available internationally. The arcade version of Capcom vs. SNK Pro was re-released in 2025 as part of Capcom Fighting Collection 2.

== Reception ==
Reception

Aggregate score
Aggregator	Score	
Aggregator	Dreamcast	PS
Metacritic	80/100	74/100

Review scores
Publication	Score	
Publication	Dreamcast	PS
AllGame	3.5/5	4/5
CNET Gamecenter	7/10	N/A
Electronic Gaming Monthly	8.5/10, 9/10, 8/10	N/A
EP Daily	5/10	N/A
Eurogamer	9/10	N/A
Famitsu	30/40	27/40
Game Informer	8/10	N/A
GameFan	97%	N/A
GameRevolution	C	N/A
GameSpot	8.2/10 (Pro) 6.9/10	6.7/10
GameSpy	8.5/10	N/A
IGN	8.8/10	8.2/10
Next Generation	3/5	N/A
Official U.S. PlayStation Magazine	N/A	3.5/5

In Japan, Game Machine listed the arcade version in their October 1, 2000 issue as the most-successful arcade game of the month. The same arcade version was nominated for the "Best Head-to-Head Arcade Fighting Game" by Monthly Arcadia, which went to Guilty Gear X. In the United States, the game sold 400 arcade units, which was slightly more than what Street Fighter III sold in the US.

The Dreamcast version of Capcom vs. SNK received "generally favorable reviews", while the PlayStation version of the Pro edition received "mixed or average reviews", according to the review aggregation website Metacritic. Uncle Dust of GamePro said of the Dreamcast version in one review, "While it would be nice to have more available characters, Capcom vs. SNK will keep you busy for a very long time, mastering the nuances of the fighting engine and unlocking the huge amount of hidden features. Capcom vs. SNK is a fantastic addition to the Dreamcast fighting library, although only hardcore fans need apply." (Note: GamePro gave the Dreamcast version 3.5/5 for graphics, 4/5 for sound, 5/5 for control, and 4.5/5 for fun factor in one review.) In another GamePro review, Uncle Dust said of the same console version, "It was a long time in coming, but Capcom vs. SNK is definitely worth the wait. It has plenty of secrets to unlock (hidden characters, levels, and play modes) to keep you playing solo for hours. The only noticeable flaw in this gem is the small 33-character lineup." (Note: GamePro gave the Dreamcast version three 4.5/5 scores for graphics, control, and fun factor, and 4/5 for sound in another review.)

Four-Eyed Dragon said of the PlayStation version, "For fighting enthusiasts still holding on to their PlayStation, Capcom vs. SNK Pro will entertain you. PS2 owners, though, should skip this title and just pick up Capcom vs. SNK 2 instead." (Note: GamePro gave the PlayStation version of the Pro edition two 3.5/5 scores for graphics and fun factor, 3/5 for sound, and 4/5 for control.) Louis Bedigian of GameZone gave the latter console version eight out of ten, calling it "a must-have fighting game for every mobile screen owner", as well as "for those few unfortunate gamers out there who have yet to get a PS2 or a GameCube." Edge gave the former console version's Japanese import a similar score of eight out of ten, calling it "a taut, lean brawler that scores points for pure depth of play. A rich tapestry woven from the finest strands of each company, this is a tour de force that no hardcore Dreamcast owner should be without." Chester "Chet" Barber of NextGen said of the same console version, "Although there are many unique ideas here, Capcom vs. SNK simply lacks ambition. Capcom and its newly acquired developers from SNK need to sit down and once again revolutionize this genre." In Japan, Famitsu gave it a score of 30 out of 40 for the Dreamcast version of both Capcom vs. SNK and the Pro Edition each, and 27 out of 40 for the PlayStation version.

The Dreamcast version won the award for "Best Fighting Game" at GameSpot's Best and Worst of 2000 Awards.
