= Fighting EX Layer =

2018 video game

- Japanese cover art
- Developer: Arika
- Publisher: Arika
- Director: Yoshitsugu Kato
- Producer: Akira Nishitani
- Artist: Naoki Imai
- Composers: Takahiro Eguchi; Fumihisa Tanaka
- Engine: Unreal Engine 4
- Platforms: PlayStation 4; Microsoft Windows; Arcade; Android; iOS; Nintendo Switch
- Release: PlayStation 4: WW: 28 June 2018; Microsoft Windows: WW: 29 November 2018; Arcade: JP: 29 November 2018; Android, iOS: WW: 1 April 2019; Nintendo Switch: JP: 1 April 2021; NA: 20 May 2021
- Genre: Fighting
- Modes: Single-player, multiplayer
- Arcade system: Taito Type X3

Fighting EX Layer is a 2018 fighting video game developed and published by Arika. It is a spiritual successor to Fighting Layer (1998) and the Street Fighter EX series (1996–2000), which Arika had developed, and features many of the same characters from the latter. The game was released originally for PlayStation 4, with ports for Microsoft Windows and arcades following. A mobile version of the game, titled Fighting EX Layer -α, was later released for iOS and Android devices in 2019, and a port to Nintendo Switch titled Fighting EX Layer: Another Dash was released in 2021.

== Gameplay ==
Pullum performing a move against Jack

Fighting EX Layer is a fighting video game played in a 2.5D environment. Battles take place in closed arenas, which vary in size and width. The gameplay retains many of the mechanics from Arika's previous fighting games, such as Super Cancels and juggling, while adding a new running mechanic. Additionally, the game features ground chain combos, an auto-combo system, and an optional Progressive mode which simplifies command inputs. Fighting EX Layer also introduces Gougi Boost, which grants players additional bonuses and enhancements during a match. These boosts can be customized by selecting different Gougi decks before the match begins. In Fighting EX Layer Another Dash, however, the Gougi decks are unavailable, while new mechanics have been introduced, replacing some older ones in exchange. Those new mechanics are the EX-Dash, EX-Arrow, EX-Illusion, Cancel Break, and Super Cancel, and cost one bar of the player's gauge per use.

== Characters ==
Fighting EX Layer was released with 13 playable characters, all of whom made appearances in the Street Fighter EX series of games. Four additional characters have been added via free post-launch updates, along with a guest fighter from SNK's Fatal Fury series as paid downloadable content, for a total of 18.

- Allen Snider
- Area^{a}
- Blair Dame
- Darun Mister
- Doctrine Dark
- Garuda
- Hayate Kamite
- Hokuto
- Jack
- Kairi
- Pullum Purna^{a}
- Sanane Suzuki
- Shadow Geist
- Sharon^{a}
- Shirase
- Skullomania
- Terry Bogard^{b}
- Vulcano Rosso^{a}

^aAdded via free in-game update
^bGuest character, paid downloadable content

== Development ==
Fighting EX Layer was developed by Japanese video game development studio Arika. The studio previously developed the Street Fighter EX series and the arcade game Fighting Layer, which are spiritual predecessors to Fighting EX Layer. Following the release of Street Fighter EX3 (2000), the game's publisher Capcom halted the series. Over the years, Arika pitched multiple ideas to Capcom for a new entry in EX series, including a demo they created for a Nintendo 3DS game. However, none of the pitches were successful.

Staff at Arika had been working on a 3D fighting game prototype to familiarise themselves with Unreal Engine 4. They decided to record some footage of the then-untitled prototype and release a trailer on April Fools' Day in 2017. The positive reaction from fans led Arika to turn the project into a full-fledged game, which they officially confirmed at Evo 2017.

Arika self-funded the development of the game. Arika's president Akira Nishitani remarked that the company had just enough funds to see the project through to completion without external help. While he viewed the game as a passion project for the studio, he said that his primary goal was to keep the company healthy financially. Nishitani noted that he was searching for potential partnerships with publishers and investors to secure additional funding, which would allow the development team to expand the game's scope and character roster.

The game's official title was announced in November 2017. A public beta featuring six playable characters was made available to download on the PlayStation 4 on 11 December 2017 and ran for two weeks. The developers used the beta to test online connectivity and gather player feedback.

The game was released for PlayStation 4 on 28 June 2018. The game was available in two versions: a lower-priced "light" version of the game that included twelve playable characters and five Gougi decks, and the standard edition, which included all of the content from the light version, along with the playable character Hokuto and ten additional Gougi decks. The light version was later phased out in February 2019 and the standard edition became the primary release. Arika also stated their intentions to add four more characters from Street Fighter EX as downloadable content if their first-month sales targets were met.

On 11 July 2018, Arika announced that a single-player Arcade Mode would be added to the game in a future update, along with additional Street Fighter EX characters Pullum Purna and Vulcano Rosso being added to the game for free. The Arcade Mode update was released two weeks later on 27 July. At Evo 2018, Arika announced Pullum and Rosso would be added in an update on 5 September, along with a further revision to the game's Arcade Mode, and that they would be developing a version of the game for arcades in collaboration with Taito. Arika also teased three more forthcoming characters: returning Street Fighter EX characters Sharon and Area, and guest fighter Terry Bogard from SNK's Fatal Fury series. Sharon and Terry were added to the game in March 2019, while Area was added the following July. On 27 September, Arika announced a port of the game for release on Microsoft Windows via Steam. Both the Arcade and Windows versions were released on 29 November 2018. A limited version of the game for mobile phones, Fighting EX Layer -α, was released on April Fool's Day 2019.

Since the game's launch, characters from the Fighting EX Layer have made crossover appearances in other titles: a female version of Skullomania is playable via downloadable content in SNK Heroines: Tag Team Frenzy, while costumes based on Fighting EX Layer characters have appeared as additions to Street Fighter V.

== Reception ==
Reception

Aggregate score
Aggregator	Score
Metacritic	73/100

Review scores
Publication	Score
Destructoid	7/10
GameSpot	8/10

Heidi Kemps of GameSpot gave the game an 8/10 rating, praising the fighting mechanics and implementation of the Gougi system while criticizing the game's spotty netcode.

Chris Carter of Destructoid gave the game a 7/10, praising its colorful character design and naturally flowing combat but criticizing the small number of game modes and the roster's lack of diversity in terms of gameplay style. He was divided on the Gougi system which he found an intriguing idea but was worried about the fact that some Gougi decks were only available through DLC. Carter also felt Fighting EX Layer made few concessions for beginners and was aimed primarily at seasoned fighting game fans.

The game was nominated for "Game, Original Fighting" at the National Academy of Video Game Trade Reviewers Awards, losing to Brawlout.
