= Akira Nishitani =

Japanese video game developer

- 西谷 亮
- Born: September 10, 1967 (age 59); Japan
- Other names: Nin-Nin; Pom G
- Occupations: Video game designer character designer
- Employers: Capcom (1986–1995); Arika (1995–present)
- Notable work: Street Fighter; Final Fight

Akira Nishitani (西谷 亮, Nishitani Akira), also known as "Nin-Nin" or simply "Pom G", is a Japanese game director, game designer and character designer.

Nishitani started working for Capcom in 1986, where he became mostly known for designing Street Fighter II and Final Fight alongside Akira Yasuda, aka Akiman. In 1995, he left Capcom to found his own company, Arika, whose first works were on the Street Fighter EX series that they developed for Capcom.

== Ludography ==
Year	Game	Role
1988	Forgotten Worlds	Game designer
1989	Final Fight	Game designer
1991	Street Fighter II	Game designer
1992	Varth: Operation Thunderstorm	Director
1992	Street Fighter II Turbo	Game designer
1994	X-Men: Children of the Atom	Game designer
1996	Street Fighter EX	Game designer
1998	Street Fighter EX2	Executive producer
1999	Cardcaptor Sakura	Executive producer
1999	Metal Walker	Scenario
2000	Street Fighter EX3	Director
2001	Everblue	Director
2002	Everblue 2	Executive producer
2002	Technic Beat	Executive producer
2004	The Nightmare of Druaga	Executive producer
2006	Super Dragon Ball Z	Director
2007	Endless Ocean	Executive producer
2008	Dr. Mario Online Rx	Game designer
2009	Endless Ocean: Blue World	Executive producer
2019	Tetris 99	Executive producer
2021	Fighting EX Layer: Another Dash	Executive producer
2022	Chocobo GP	Executive producer
2024	Endless Ocean Luminous	Executive producer
