= Red Earth (video game) =

1996 fighting arcade game

- Brochure for the game
- Developer: Capcom
- Publisher: Capcom
- Composer: Takayuki Iwai
- Platform: Arcade
- Release: JP: November 21, 1996; NA: November 21, 1996
- Genre: Fighting
- Modes: Single-player, multiplayer
- Arcade system: CP System III

Red Earth, released in Japan as Warzard (ウォーザード, Wōzādo), is a 1996 fighting game developed and published by Capcom for arcades. It was the first game for Capcom's CP System III hardware, the same hardware which Street Fighter III and its derivatives ran on. Red Earth received its first home console port as a part of the Capcom Fighting Collection in June 2022 for PlayStation 4, Xbox One, Nintendo Switch, and PC.

== Gameplay ==
Leo fighting Gi Gi

Red Earth features two different game modes: a single-player Quest Mode and a two-player Versus Mode. The Quest Mode essentially operates as the game's standard arcade mode and the player chooses from one of the four main characters to progress through their character's storyline while fighting against a series of eight computer-controlled adversaries in one-on-one battles. The game has a unique take on the fighting genre, as it combines elements from the beat 'em up genre, in that each fight is against a boss-style monster with a large health bar, none of whom are playable characters, and defeating each one gains the player character experience points which are used to improve the character's attack and defense and access new moves. A story arc develops before and after each fight as well. In Versus Mode, two players fight against each other, each using any of the four main characters (including the same character as the other player). Red Earth uses a password feature that allows the player to play the game later on the same skill level their character reached when it ended the last time. The character is able to acquire new abilities depending on the skill level that has been reached.

The fighting system itself is similar to previous Capcom fighting games such as the Street Fighter series with a few key differences. First of all, the vitality gauge of each computer-controlled opponent fought by the player during Quest mode is displayed across the bottom of the screen, and is much larger than the player's own vitality gauge. Also, as the player lands hits on their opponents, various coins and treasure chests come out. Collecting coins provides experience points, while various items can be found in treasure chests such as orbs (used to perform super moves) and food (which replenishes the player's vitality). These elements make the game very similar to a side-scrolling action game rather than a traditional fighting game, similar to Capcom's own adaptation of the Dungeons & Dragons beat 'em up game.

Red Earth is one of the few Capcom games with fatalities. They include splitting the opponent in half, artery rupture, organ removal, and limb slicing. It also features multiple endings and hidden endings influenced by the player's actions, given choices (akin to Chun-Li's ending in Super Street Fighter II), amount of continues used, and the manner of killing enemies.

== Characters ==
Red Earth takes place on an alternate version of Earth sometime in the 14th century (the Japanese version states a post-apocalyptic 1999, however) where the world did not experience any technological revolutions or Renaissance and was still in a medieval/mythological state.

A new country has risen by the evil Scion, who sends out various monsters to take over the world. Four heroes emerge to defend Earth.

=== Heroes ===
- Leo (voiced by Daisuke Gōri) – the King of Savalia (Greedia in Warzard), who was transformed into a half-lion half-man state when an unknown force invaded his kingdom. The three wise men tried to remove the curse but couldn't. Leo uses the curse as his strength to "repay his debt to his countrymen" only to return to Savalia and find a large number of people (civilians and soldiers) have been kidnapped, and the monster Hauzer awaiting him.
- Kenji (Mukuro in Warzard, voiced by Yukimasa Kishino) – the head of the Ramon family and leader of the Oniwabanshu, an elite ninja squadron who serve the Shogun of Zipang. When an unknown army of invaders attacks his country with flying blackships, the Shogun orders Kenji to assess the situation. Although Kenji secretly distrusts his Shogun and believes that he may be betraying the country, he goes along with everything during his investigation.
- Tessa (Tabasa in Warzard, voiced by Tomoko Naka) – a female "sorcerologist" who studies the scientific aspects of magic. She lives in Icelarn and excels in the use of magic. When a large series of thunderstorms began occurring in her area, Tessa starts to investigate their cause, believing that they're not natural. When she meets an opponent, she can easily tell everything about him or her, whether the opponent is evil or good.
- Mai-Ling (Tao in Warzard, voiced by Megumi Urawa) – a young talented martial artist from Gora, she finds her hometown in ruins after returning from a martial arts tournament. Moments later the one responsible for the attack, Lavia, turns up and attacks her. After her fight with the transformed harpy she decides to search the world for those who attacked her home and to find the missing children of her village.

=== Bosses ===
- Hauzer – a fossil resurrected by Scion, that largely resembles a Tyrannosaurus rex with ram horns and dragon fins and was sent to attack Savalia (Greedia in Japan), Leo's kingdom and inhabits his stage.
- Kongou (voiced by Daisuke Gōri) – Kongou was once a mere human named Tanuma from Zipang. He was a portly merchant with no fighting ability, but then he met Scion, who bestowed upon him the ability to transform into an oni. Now known as Kongou, he is terrorizing his own homeland, wielding a massive kanabo and reducing those who stand in his way to nothing.
- Hydron (Nool in Warzard, voiced by Osamu Hosoi) – a half-nautilus, half-kraken mutated squid monster who was given power by Scion. Hydron inhabits the Icelarn stage.
- Lavia (Luan in Warzard, voiced by Tomoko Naka) – a harpy who was once good before being cursed into an attractive yet corrupted monster by Scion and then attacked Gora, Mai Ling's village which she now inhabits.
- Ravange (Secmeto in Warzard, from Egyptian 𓋴𓇌𓎡𓅓𓇌𓏏) – a cross between an Egyptian sphinx and a Greek chimera, he was created by a follower of Scion, the ruling priestess of Sangypt (Alanbird in Japan) named Clara Tantra (Arumana IV in Japan) who infuses the power of the lion, goat, eagle, dragon, and cobra together along with hers into the sphinx statue, which later comes to life.
- Gi Gi (voiced by Osamu Hosoi) – a robotic Chavín statue that inhabits within the Crypt. The detail of Gi Gi's sprite is an example of asymmetrical color schemes. When facing left, the main parts and trimmings of Gi Gi's body will be red, but when he is facing right, they will be blue. Gi Gi's color change would become the inspiration for Street Fighter III final boss Gill, but in a more detailed degree.
- Blade (originally Jihad in the earlier Japanese versions, voiced by Yukimasa Kishino) – the sub-boss of the game. Once commander of Leo's bodyguards, he was soon turned into an emerald by Scion, which animates the suit of armor around it. Now, he is Scion's second-in command and acts as an enforcer who guards outside Darminor castle. Also, the battle against him has two phases. In the first phase, he is wearing a red cape. In the second phase which is activated by him taking enough damage, he discards his cape.
- Scion (Valdoll in Warzard, voiced by Daisuke Gōri) – a wizard who resides inside Darminor castle and the final boss of the game. A being that feeds and draws power from the darkness and hatred of mankind, he claims to be the messiah of the world, and intends to destroy the generation of humans in order to build a new one from its ruins. Scion has dragons who aid him in battle and has an attack similar to Ouke no Sabaki, a move used by Anakaris from the Darkstalkers series, in which it changes a character into a miniature/child version of his/herself. Leo becomes a cub, Kenji becomes a beetle, Tessa becomes a penguin and Mai-Ling becomes a monkey. After he is defeated in the first round, he and his dragons mutate into powerful forms for a second round.

== Development ==
According to Takashi Sado, Red Earth was made due to the growing popularity of fighting games in the 1990s. Although the game was inspired by Magic Sword and The King of Dragons, both made by Capcom, it was different from other fighting games due to the inclusion of a set of parameters and equipment so that casual players can keep up with more experienced players.

== Release ==
=== Soundtrack ===
An official soundtrack of the game was released on December 18, 1996, for ¥3200. It was composed by Takayuki Iwai with additional help by Ryoji Yamamoto and Wataru Hachisako. It contains 72 tracks over 2 CDs. Certain tracks were later featured in the 2004 game Capcom Fighting Evolution, although they are downgraded versions and slightly offtune.

=== Merchandise ===
Two books about the game were published in Japan. The first one, titled All About Warzard, is an in-depth look at the creation of the game. It contains many pages of concept art and screenshots, details on technical and musical aspects of the game as well as gameplay strategies. The other book, titled Gamest Mook #65: Warzard, was a similar, although unofficial book. This book also contained a fan art section.

A Darkstalkers and Red Earth crossover manga, entitled "Maleficarum", was published in Japan in 1997. The English edition was made available by UDON in October 2010. Capcom also released several figurines of the various characters and bosses from the game.

== Reception ==
In Japan, Game Machine listed Red Earth on their February 1, 1997 issue as being the second most-popular arcade game for the previous two weeks.

The game was reviewed by Hyper magazine and rated 4 out of 5 stars.

== Legacy ==
Some of the characters from Red Earth have appeared in other video games:

- Tessa appeared as a playable character in SNK vs. Capcom: SVC Chaos and Super Gem Fighter plus a cameo in Leo's ending in Capcom Fighting Evolution. She also appears in Dr. Strange's ending in Ultimate Marvel vs Capcom 3.
- Leo appeared as a playable character in Capcom Fighting Evolution. He makes a cameo appearance in Hawkeye's ending in Ultimate Marvel vs Capcom 3.
- Kenji also appeared as a playable character in Capcom Fighting Evolution. He makes an appearance as a character card in the "Heroes and Heralds" mode of Ultimate Marvel vs Capcom 3.
- Mai-Ling is the only one of the four main characters who hasn't appeared as a playable character in a crossover game, but she appeared in Pyron and Leo's endings in Capcom Fighting Evolution, in Tessa's defenses from Super Gem Fighter, and in the background of the Shanghai stage in Capcom vs SNK 2.
- Hauzer not only became playable in Capcom Fighting Evolution, but also appeared in Ryu's ending in Super Gem Fighter and in Karas and Saki's endings in Tatsunoko vs. Capcom.
- Hydron is the remaining playable character in Capcom Fighting Evolution.
- Gi Gi appears in PTX-40A's ending in Tatsunoko vs. Capcom.
- Several of the bosses from Red Earth appear in the background of a Red Earth-themed stage in Capcom Fighting Evolution. Gi Gi and Kongou appear in Jedah's ending in this game, and Blade also appeared in Leo's ending.
- Kongou and Ravange also appear in Hsien-Ko's ending in Ultimate Marvel vs Capcom 3, along with Marvel's Thor Odinson, Hela, Jedah from Darkstalkers, and Orochi from Ōkami.
- Tessa, Leo, Kenji and Mai-Ling appear as cards in the SNK vs. Capcom: Card Fighters series.
- In Capcom's Dragon's Dogma: Dark Arisen, a certain piece of armor is called the "Cursed King's Belt" with the description of "a belt worn by an eliminator. The relic of a king who was cursed to live as a lion, it boosts the wearer's ability to stagger his opponents", a reference to the character Leo.
- In Street Fighter V, according to the game's Japanese only Arcade Edition – Visionary Book II, a crystal ball owned by a Street Fighter character Menat, the "Left Eye of the Lion" was stated by the sixth mainline game's director Takayuki Nakayama to be created from a product of a god-beast believed to have once protected the phantom desert kingdom of Sangypt, Ravange's home territory.
- The franchise was added to Teppen in January 2022.
