= Zangief =

Street Fighter character

- Street Fighter character
- Zangief in Super Street Fighter II (1993)
- First appearance: Street Fighter II: The World Warrior (1991)
- Created by: Akira "Akiman" Yasuda
- Designed by: Akira "Akiman" Yasuda and Ikuo "Ikusan.Z" Nakayama (Street Fighter II)
- Voiced by: English: Michael Sorich (Street Fighter II: The Animated Movie) Kevin Seymour (Street Fighter II V, Animaze dub) Michael Donovan (Street Fighter animated series) Joe Romersa (Street Fighter Alpha: The Animation) Peter Beckman (Street Fighter IV, Street Fighter X Tekken, Street Fighter V, Street Fighter 6) Rich Moore (Wreck-It Ralph) Tony Azzolino (Hi Score Girl); Japanese: Wataru Takagi (Street Fighter Alpha series, Marvel vs. Capcom series) Tesshō Genda (Capcom vs. SNK series, Capcom Fighting Evolution) Kenta Miyake (Street Fighter IV, Street Fighter X Tekken, Street Fighter V, Hi Score Girl, Street Fighter 6) Tetsuo Kanao (Street Fighter II: The Animated Movie) Yasuo Tanaka (Street Fighter II V) Hidenari Ugaki (Street Fighter Zero: The Animation) Ryūzaburō Ōtomo (Japanese television dub of the Street Fighter film) Katsuhisa Hōki (Japanese video and DVD dub of the Street Fighter film) Shin-ichiro Miki (Real Battle on Film) Minoru Hirota (Wreck-It Ralph)
- Portrayed by: Andrew Bryniarski (Street Fighter film, games); Olivier Richters (2026 film)

In-universe information
- Nickname: The Red Cyclone
- Fighting style: Sambo; Professional wrestling
- Origin: USSR
- Nationality: Russian

Zangief (/ˈzɑːŋɡiɛf/; Japanese: ザンギエフ) is a fictional character in Capcom's Street Fighter series. The character was introduced as one of the eight playable characters in the video game Street Fighter II: The World Warrior (1991). In the game, Zangief primarily fights using grappling moves and is considered to be the first grappler-type fighting game character. The character was initially planned to be a strong but slow fighter placeholder named Vodka Golbalsky before eventually becoming a grappler after their name change, which derives from that of a Soviet wrestler. In the Street Fighter series, Zangief is a professional wrestler, nicknamed the Red Cyclone (赤きサイクロン), who hails from Russia and fights to prove the country's superiority by triumphing over other nations fighters in combat.

== Conception and design ==
Designed by Akira Yasuda, Zangief was initially planned for Street Fighter II to be a very strong but extremely slow character to play as. Zangief was named "Vodka Gobalsky" as a placeholder; his name was later changed to Zangief after a wrestler from the Soviet Union. Early designs of the character closely resembled the character's finalized appearance, but with the addition of a black tanktop and anchor tattoo on his upper arms. In an interview with Game On!, Capcom Research and Development head Noritaka Funamizu stated that of the series' characters, Zangief was one of the most popular characters with American audiences, alongside Ryu and Guile.

Zangief appears as a tall, muscular man clad in red wrestling tights and boots, a studded gold belt, and red/gold wristbands. His brown hair is cut in a short mohawk style, and he has a beard/mustache and a large amount of hair on his chest. His arms and legs are covered with scars. Yasuda developed his finalized appearance with Ikuo "Ikusan.Z" Nakayama, a fan of professional wrestling, and aimed to give his muscles a practical purpose where he could reasonably take hits, instead of a focus on a bodybuilder's physique. Zangief's large size was meant to invoke the mental image of a bear, a symbol commonly associated with Russia; the designers were worried Street Fighter II producer Akira Nishitani would reject it due to game balance concerns. Nishitani however responded "Please make him much bigger."

Yasuda wanted to avoid depicting the character as humorous or villainous. Instead, he wanted Zangief depicted as someone driven by intensity and passion. However, with the Street Fighter Alpha series, Zangief's personality was expanded upon; the series portrayed him both in a humorous manner at times, but more as a heroic character. This interpretation was built upon up through Street Fighter V, with producer Takayuki Nakayama wanting the character to be portrayed as a positive and charismatic influence on his younger colleagues.

== Appearances ==
Zangief has always been difficult to use because of his slow speed, lack of projectiles and his best moves require precise timing and difficult input controls. However, that was not always the case. When Street Fighter II was being developed, the Capcom team placed a machine in a Kyobashi arcade to assess the balancing issues between the characters. One unknown player got so good with Zangief, that he won 85 games in a row with him. In fact, other players would not even play the game because they feared him. "Regardless of how much we balanced Zangief in-house, this one Zangief expert would win all the time," Street Fighter II creator Yoshiki Okamoto says. Eventually, Zangief was nerfed so much, that this player would occasionally lose. Okamoto later said in a video “Assuming that player is watching this now... It's your fault Zangief [became] weaker.” Outside of Street Fighter, he appears as a playable character in the crossover fighting Street Fighter X Tekken, with his official tag partner, Rufus. Zangief appears as a Spirit in the Nintendo crossover fighting game Super Smash Bros. Ultimate. After the player defeats Incineroar from Pokémon and rescue Zangief's spirit, they have access to a dojo where he can teach other spirits the "Overthrow" style.

Various actors have voiced the character in his video game appearances: he is voiced by Wataru Takagi in the Street Fighter Alpha and Street Fighter EX series, Tesshō Genda in the Capcom vs. SNK series and Capcom Fighting Evolution, and Kenta Miyake in Japanese and Peter Beckman in English for Street Fighter IV. In anime, he is voiced in Japanese by Tetsuo Kanao and in English by William Johnson. In the live-action Street Fighter film, the character was portrayed by Andrew Bryniarski, who was dubbed over by Ryūzaburō Ōtomo in the Japanese television dub and by Katsuhisa Hōki in the video and DVD dub. In the film Wreck-It Ralph, he was voiced by director Rich Moore. Zangief also appears as a playable character in Super Gem Fighter Mini Mix.

In the live-action Street Fighter movie, Zangief is portrayed by Andrew Bryniarski. He is once again a lackey of Bison's, only this time he has a good heart (though he is extremely simple-minded) and truly believes Bison's propaganda that the A.N. are the enemies of world peace and freedom. Zangief gives Ryu and Ken their signature white and red gis, which are actually training uniforms for Bison's men. During the climactic battle, Zangief battles E. Honda. After the battle ends, he is told by Dee Jay that Bison was in fact the enemy and had been fooling Zangief the whole time. To redeem himself, Zangief helps Ryu and Ken hold the emergency exit door open for the hostages to escape. He is last seen complementing Guile's bravery and gives him the Bison salute, which Guile turns into a thumbs-up. Dutch bodybuilder and actor Olivier Richters portrayed Zangief in the 2026 reboot.

The character has also appeared in various animated media. In Street Fighter II: The Animated Movie, Zangief appears very briefly during a brutal battle against Blanka to entertain an audience of crime bosses, where he is electrocuted by him, though his fate afterwards is unknown. In Street Fighter II V, he is a henchman for Shadaloo, and sent by M. Bison to capture Ryu, whom he had seen displaying talents of Hadou on a beach earlier. Ryu resists, and they fight for a while until Zangief manages to knock him out. As they are leaving, Zangief spots Guile watching them from afar, and later on, while Guile and Nash are infiltrating Bison's base, Zangief corners Guile with the intention of killing him under Bison's orders. Guile and Zangief fight until Guile manages to knock Zangief out with a severe blow to the head. He is not seen again after for the rest of the anime, leaving his fate unknown when the base is destroyed after Ryu and Ken defeat Bison. In Street Fighter Alpha: The Animation, he appears as a competitor in a fighting tournament. He fights Shun, Ryu's alleged little brother, and begins to ruthlessly beat the boy until Ryu intervenes and battles Zangief. Zangief appears to have the upper hand, but Ryu, in his rage, almost gives in to the Dark Hadō and fires a lethal dark Hadōken. The Hadōken narrowly misses Zangief but causes the building to collapse. Zangief, stunned by Ryu's power, subsequently falls through the crumbling floor.

Zangief makes an appearance in the 2012 Walt Disney film Wreck-It Ralph, voiced by the film's director Rich Moore. He and M. Bison are among the game characters present at a meeting of "Bad-Anon", a villain support group, when Wreck-It Ralph decides to attend. Ralph later finds a pair of Zangief's tights in the lost-and-found box at Tapper's bar and reacts with disgust. Zangief appears again in the 2018 sequel Ralph Breaks the Internet where Ralph and Vanellope wonder how he only has hair on his chest, shins and face. Later, at the end of the movie, Zangief attends a book club with Ralph, Sonic and Q*Bert. Strangely, despite appearing at "Bad-Anon", he is not a villain in his own video game series; however, Street Fighter archvillain M. Bison is also shown in attendance. According to the film's writer, Phil Johnston who could never beat him in the game as a child, Zangief attended the meeting because Johnston felt bad for all the players who could never beat him.

In print media, Zangief appeared in Masaomi Kanzaki's Street Fighter manga, which was released in the early 1990s. In his depiction in the comic, he was depicted very much like his video game self. One of Zangief's main motivations was to defeat Guile, who as an American, represented the rival country of Zangief's homeland; however, the Soviet wrestler found himself coming up short in their battles. In more recent adaptations, Zangief is shown to interact more with Ryu, either as an enemy or ally, and his win quotes in Street Fighter IV imply that it was Ryu who knocked him out of the second tournament. Zangief appears in Masahiko Nakahira's Sakura Ganbaru! manga, in which he is introduced fighting in his exact same stage from Street Fighter Alpha 2. He first defeats Blanka, and then is engaged by Sakura and Cammy, whom he easily overpowered. He was later defeated by the duo and his friendly and good natured personality soon surfaced.

== Critical reception ==
IGN's D. F. Smith cited Zangief as defining an archetype many later fighting game characters would utilize. Though he called him "a bit of a stereotype", Smith praised how well the character was portrayed; he added that "it is hard to imagine a more perfect embodiment of the muscle-bound grappling goon." Maxwell McGee and Lucas Sullivan of GamesRadar+ described his design as "a story, one of struggle and triumph in the Russian wilderness", praising the elements that illustrated his character's background and the way it also helped portray him as someone "resolve and dedication" while also having "a sense of humor". Chris Moyse of Destructoid named his Spinning Piledriver "one of the most famous moves in fighting game history", and described him as "the wrestler with an iron body and a golden heart [...] still considered the de facto grappler of the series". Paste cited his appearance in Wreck-It Ralph as an example of how memorable Zangief had become since his introduction in Street Fighter II, adding "his intimidating presence and lovable demeanor made him a standout of the original World Warrior line-up."

Zangief has also been the subject of academic study. The book Convergent Wrestling noted that his addition along with E. Honda in Street Fighter II set the game apart from other fighting game titles at the time, due to their role as wrestlers, which helped legitimize wrestling among other martial arts. Noting a similar to real life wrestler Victor Zangiev, they also drew comparison to Ivan Koloff, due to both Zangief and Koloff reflecting ties with both the Cold War and the USSR, due to their use of red and gold throughout their outfits. The book further emphasized that Zangief was "a lamination, not of a specific wrestler but of a stereotype" of what people associated with professional wrestling. In a paper titled Tendencies in Representation of Russian Culture in Computer Games, Zangief's design was noted as one of the first attempts at selling a "credible" image of Russian fighters to Western audiences due to the Iron Curtain. To this end it noted that the developers often resorted to certain "tricks" to relay the character's culture to the audience, namely the character's loud and unchanging steadfast nature. However the paper praised that while the character often was displayed with a negative/neutral reputation in the games in their eyes, being a member of a community in Wreck It Ralph was seen as a positive image.
