= Sakura Kasugano =

Street Fighter character

- Street Fighter character
- Sakura from Street Fighter Alpha Anthology
- First game: Street Fighter Alpha 2 (1996)
- Created by: Akira 'Akiman' Yasuda
- Voiced by: English: Saffron Henderson (Street Fighter cartoon); Michelle Ruff (Street Fighter Alpha: The Animation, Street Fighter Alpha: Generations); Hannah Church (Street Fighter motion comics); Brittney Lee Harvey (Street Fighter IV, Street Fighter X Tekken, Street Fighter V); Japanese: Yuko Sasamoto (Street Fighter Alpha series, Street Fighter EX series, Super Puzzle Fighter II Turbo, Marvel vs. Capcom series, Pocket Fighter, Rival Schools: United by Fate, Capcom vs. SNK series, Capcom Fighting Evolution, Namco × Capcom); Chiaki Osawa (Street Fighter Alpha: The Animation); Mao Kawasaki (Street Fighter Alpha: Generations); Misato Fukuen (Street Fighter IV, Street Fighter X Tekken, Street Fighter V); Aya Hisakawa (SFA2 drama CD)

In-universe information
- Fighting style: Shotokan
- Origin: Japan
- Nationality: Japanese

Sakura Kasugano (春日野 さくら, Kasugano Sakura) is a character in Capcom's Street Fighter series. She made her first appearance in Street Fighter Alpha 2 in 1996 and is a young Japanese fighter who idolizes the series' protagonist Ryu, by whom she wants to be trained. She has often appeared in other games, including many crossover titles. Sakura quickly became a firm fan favorite in both Japan and the West, having ranked at or near the top of numerous official popularity polls run by Capcom.

Sakura was created by Akira "Akiman" Yasuda as a departure from traditional martial artists by giving her a youthful look with a school uniform which was revised following games from the series until Street Fighter V where she was given an alternate skin. Critical response to the character was generally positive due to her contrast with Ryu as well as the more mature female character Chun-Li, which makes her characterization stand out ever since her introduction to her more adult take in Street Fighter V.

== Conception and design ==
During the development of the Street Fighter Alpha series, character designer Akira "Akiman" Yasuda expressed his disdain for how he felt the series was proceeding, recycling too many elements from preceding games while also appearing to be more influenced by the works of other companies. With the second game in the series, Street Fighter Alpha 2, he decided to take a more involved approach. Not wanting to do so half-heartedly, he wanted to include a design he felt could differentiate it from the Street Fighter series by including a more distinct "high school girl" type of character. However, after he handed the design over to the development team the character was cut from the final game shortly thereafter. Disappointed he returned to his desk, but one of his superiors passing by noticed the design and praised it, insisting that it be put back into the game.

Sakura stands 157 cm (5 ft 2 in) tall, and has measurements of 80-60-84 cm (32-24-33 in). Her outfit consists of a Japanese school uniform known as a sailor fuku, consisting of a white and blue loos shirt that exposes her lower midriff, a yellow scarf around the neck, a red undershirt, and a blue skirt with red bloomers underneath. Her hands are covered with red fighting gloves, while she has red hi-top sneakers on her feet. Meanwhile a long white headband covers her brow visible through her short haircut. Yasuda chose the outfit due to its association with Japanese high school girls, but also due to its presence as a trope in various Japanese media creating instant recognizability with audiences. Yasuda stated regarding the choice "As characters, female high school students are all-powerful in Japan [...] They're pretty much at the top of hierarchy".

Yasuda stated regarding the design that he was annoyed by the attitudes of the development team at the time who were younger and more focused on current style trends. Additionally he felt they wanted to focus solely on "cool" characters and exclude more "weird" designs seen in the preceding games, such as E. Honda, and over-emphasizing an anime aesthetic in his view. He submitted Sakura knowing they expected a character more in line with designs seen in media such as The Matrix, expecting the project leaders would dislike the submission. He additionally wanted her to be "something different" in the roster that fit outside the game's "narrow world view". Additional artwork for Sakura was provided by artist Naoto "Bengus" Kuroshima, who considers her a character he could express himself more easily with in contrast to others in the series and one he could draw naturally. Yasuda in turn appreciated his additions, feeling they helped her become a great character. The outfit remained standard look in titles up to Street Fighter IV, as the producers felt it was an appearance for her players expected, even though by that point in the series' timeline she was no longer a high school student.

With her appearance in IV she was given several alternative outfits such as gym clothes and a facsimile of fellow character Ryu's attire. She was designed by Daigo Ikeno, who found himself drawing a large number of sketches of her due to her cute design, while maintaining what he called her "peek-a-boo" aspect.

An early design for Street Fighter Alpha 2 featured her in a kimono shirt and hakama pants, but was later abandoned in favor of sailor fuku with red underwear, often seen during her kicks. One pose used by Sakura after winning a battle is to moonwalk. In the ending of Street Fighter IV, her hair is longer and she now sports a tracksuit top and a pair of athletic shorts. For her appearance in Street Fighter V, Sakura's development ideas resembling her previous games, however in the end she was given a complete redesign to signify her no longer being a high school student despite how "schoolgirl outfit may be the strongest image associated with Sakura" (it is still available as an alternate costume). Other ideas included Sakura working a part-time job at a Japanese bento shop or as an assistant and actor for a motion capture studio. Her new default outfit is based on those worn by Japanese idols and she is wearing a red headband out of respect for Ryu.

== Appearances ==
=== Video games ===
Sakura first appears in Street Fighter Alpha 2, where she participates in street fighting after watching Ryu win the first World Warrior tournament. She searches for him and wishes for him to train her to be a better fighter. She eventually comes across Ryu, who tells her he cannot train her as he still has much to learn himself shortly after a sparring match. In Street Fighter Alpha 3, Sakura decides to travel the world to find Ryu. After Ryu saves her from M. Bison, he promises Sakura a rematch at around the same time, she met and formed a rivalry with Karin Kanzuki. In Street Fighter IV, years have passed since Sakura last saw Ryu, so she decides to find Ryu again for a match in the new worldwide tournament. In the introduction sequences of Super Street Fighter IV, she is often seen in a group of three with Dan Hibiki and Blanka. She eventually finds Ryu. After the tournament, they exchange goodbyes. In her ending, a slightly older-looking Sakura sees Ryu approaching. In Street Fighter V, she is done with school and now works part-time at an arcade, but wonders what decisions she needs to make in order to be satisfied with her future. Her rivalry with Karin continues and when Karin notices Sakura's problem, she sends Ryu over to Sakura's house to spar with her friend.

Sakura is playable in the Street Fighter EX series' fighting games Street Fighter EX Plus α and Street Fighter EX3. She would also appear as the only non-Street Fighter II character in the proposed but never realized game Street Fighter IV: Flashback. She is featured in the spin-off games Street Fighter: Puzzle Spirits and Street Fighter Battle Combination. Sakura makes a guest appearance in the fighting game Rival Schools: United by Fate, where she is involved in the adventure between her Tamagawa Minami High School and various other schools in Aoharu City. After helping her childhood friend Hinata and the others out from within the ordeal, she realizes how much it means to her to protect something she cares about. Sakura was included as "insurance" due to worries of bad sales.

Sakura has appeared in various crossover fighting games, including the Marvel vs. Capcom and Capcom vs. SNK series, as well as in Super Gem Fighter Mini Mix and Capcom Fighting Evolution. She has an alter-ego called "Dark Sakura" (日焼けしたさくら, Hiyakeshita Sakura; lit. "Sunburned Sakura") as a secret character in Marvel Super Heroes vs. Street Fighter. She also appears as DLC in Street Fighter X Tekken with Blanka as her official tag team partner. Sakura is a playable unit in the tactical role-playing game Namco × Capcom. She is featured in the social game Onimusha Soul, where she appears in three different forms redesigned to fit its feudal Japan theme. In the mobile puzzle game Street Fighter: Puzzle Spirits, she appears as a super-deformed character. Her likeness appears in We Love Golf! as an unlockable cosplay outfit for the character Meg and her character costume can be unlocked in Crimson Tears.

=== Other appearances ===
Sakura is the titular character of the manga series Street Fighter: Sakura Ganbaru! by Masahiko Nakahira, where she becomes a fighter in order to fight Ryu; of note, Karin first appeared in this manga before her video game debut in Street Fighter Alpha 3. She starred in the comic book miniseries Street Fighter Legends: Sakura (and the one-shot Street Fighter: Sakura vs. Karin) by UDON, and appeared in UDON's other Street Fighter comic books and the Rival Schools comic. She also appears in the Super Street Fighter graphic novels, in which she becomes Ryu's full-time apprentice and succumbed the power of the Dark Hadou before Ryu absorbed it out of her.

Sakura is a character in the anime films Street Fighter Alpha: The Animation and Street Fighter Alpha: Generations, and appears in the episode "Second to None" of the American cartoon series Street Fighter. She is a supporting character in Street Fighter IV: The Ties That Bind, assisting Ken in his efforts to locate Ryu.

Victor Entertainment released a drama CD Street Fighter Zero 2 Another Story in 1996, which had Sakura as the lead character. A sequel followed later that same year. Sakura's theme song, "Kono Omoi o Tsutaetai" sung by Yuko Sasamoto, her voice actress in Street Fighter Alpha 2 and other games following, was released commercially.

Many figures of Sakura were released by various manufacturers, such as one in two versions by Kotobukiya in 2015. "Sakura's bowl of stamina" meals were included in a restaurant menu during one promotional event. Sakura's card is included in the card games Street Fighter Deck-Building Game and Universal Fighting System. A Sakura cosmetic outfit has also been added to Fortnite.

== Critical reception ==
Sakura has been well received since her introduction. The staff of GamesRadar+ described her as one of Capcom's best characters, stating while the word "fanboy/fangirl" was often a negative, her idol worship of Ryu allowed her to develop into one of the best fighters in the Street Fighter setting. Noting Sakura's role as one of the few female characters introduced in the franchise at the point, of her introduction they felt her "spunky, can-do attitude" made her one of the most popular characters in the Street Fighter Alpha series. The staff of New Zealand Station magazine on the other hand were critical of her character, feeling she represented "dangerous new territory" for the depiction of women in gaming as they felt Capcom had shifted away from the "wholesome and strong-willed Chun Li into the cute but undeniably underaged Sakura". The Arcadia magazine had a commentary about the parallels Sakura shares with The King of Fighters participant Athena Asamiya due to their similarities. Aoi Nishimata's work on Sakura made both characters stand out also in the moe factor which led to the developers for these characters interact again. In retrospect, both Athena and Sakura were found similar due to their designs and age mismatched for the fighting genre, made a striking debut in the mid-1990s. There was a slight anxiety as to whether these frail and weak girls would be able to fight against strong fighters, perhaps due to the influence of Sailor Moon which was creating a boom at the time. A decade after their debut, Athena's bold image change with her costumes and hairstyles has given her amusement, while Sakura's sense of security as an eternal high school girl has built up a history of their own "good points. Both heroines are supported by many fans, and even in modern times continue to shine as active poster girls, appearing in simulation games and puzzle games. According to VG247, early promotion of Capcom and SNK crossover games involving Sakura and Kyo Kusanagi from The King of Fighters playing the video games was a major surprise to the audience back in the early 2000s.

IGN's D. F. Smith described Sakura as being at the start of Street Fighter becoming a multimedia phenomon through various media and merchandise, stating that she was "never just a video game character" due to her presence in the Sakura Ganbaru! comic strip. In terms of design, he argued that many depending on how one looked at her the emphasis on sex appeal may be too obvious and described her as a "teenage girl in a sailor uniform with a skirt that's a whole lot shorter than normal" and added "No prizes for guessing who that's meant to appeal to." Regardless, he felt this contrasted well with her demeanor, and that while she was often the subject of comic relief and her appearance might be "a little silly [...] her attitude is all business". Michael Colwander of Comic Book Resources stated that "Few characters have made as much of an impact on the SF series as Sakura when she debuted" due to how well her energetic personality resonated with the fan community. He further noted that while her schoolgirl uniform had defined her character for some time he appreciated how well her Street Fighter V attire represented a progression in time for the character, and served as a good start to illustrate the franchise moving forward narratively.

In terms of her character, Suriel Vazquez and Eric Van Allen of Paste stated they felt Sakura was sometimes "the only character who’s actually having fun with this whole street-fighting thing" in the franchise, praising her infectious "relentless optimism" and her relationships with the other characters in the franchise. They added while she wasn't the strongest character in the series, they still appreciated that she was self-taught and eager, and saw her as a reflection of how players should approach fighting games: "acknowledging weaknesses while taking them in stride". Gavin Jasper of Den of Geek meanwhile called her "one of the best characters in the series", stating that in many ways she added meaning to Ryu's life as a character and acted as the "angel" on his shoulder in contrast to his rivalry with Akuma and constantly believing him. He further called her a "plucky go-getter", appreciating how she managed to carve her own niche in the Street Fighter universe and illustrated visible growth as a character through her relationships with Dan, Karin and the Rival Schools cast.
