= Taketora =

- Gender: Male

Origin
- Origin: Japanese
- Meaning: Different meanings depending on the kanji used

Taketora (written: 武虎 or 竹虎) is a masculine Japanese given name. Notable people with the name include:

- Taketora Ogata (緒方 竹虎) (1888–1956), Japanese journalist and politician
- Ōnohana Taketora (大乃花 武虎) (born 1958), Japanese sumo wrestler
- Taketora (voice actor) (武虎) (born 1974), Japanese voice actor

== Fictional characters ==
- Taketora Yamamoto (山本猛虎), a character from the manga and anime Haikyu!! with the position of wing spiker from Nekoma High
