= Street Fighter EX =

1996 video game

- Japanese arcade flyer
- Developer: Arika
- Publishers: Capcom; PlayStation: WW: Capcom; EU: Virgin Interactive
- Designers: Junichi Ono; Akira Nishitani; Noritaka Funamizu; Kazuko Kawanaka; Masashi Tanaka
- Programmers: Hori Takamasa; Hiroyasu Od Hassy; Akira Kurabayashi
- Artists: Jun Matsumura; Alien Pole; Masaaki Tanaka; Kazuko Kawanaka
- Composers: Takayuki Aihara; Shinji Hosoe; Ayako Saso
- Series: Street Fighter
- Platforms: Arcade, PlayStation
- Release: Arcade: JP: November 22, 1996; WW: December 19, 1996; (Plus): JP: March 3, 1997; NA: March 5, 1997; PlayStation (Plus α): JP: July 17, 1997; NA: October 23, 1997; EU: November 28, 1997
- Genre: Fighting
- Modes: Single-player, multiplayer
- Arcade system: Sony ZN-1

Street Fighter EX is a 1996 fighting game originally released as a coin-operated arcade game for the Sony ZN hardware. It is a spin-off of the Street Fighter series co-produced by Capcom with Arika and was the first game in the series to feature 3D polygon graphics, although it retains the 2D plane gameplay. An updated arcade version was released subtitled Plus, as well as a PlayStation-exclusive home console version titled Street Fighter EX Plus α, both released in 1997. The game received a sequel, Street Fighter EX2, in 1998.

== Gameplay ==
Gameplay screenshot of Street Fighter EX Plus α on PlayStation depicting a battle of Chun-Li vs. Blair

The Street Fighter EX fighting system uses fighting systems from the Street Fighter II and Street Fighter Alpha series, but also has some original ones. In many ways, EX still plays like a 2D fighting game, but the linear plane in which characters fight often changes along a 3D arena. The game uses special moves and super combos familiar or similar to previous games in the series. Unlike in the Street Fighter Alpha titles or Darkstalkers, the EX series features a super meter with three separate sections, not levels, which is unique to this spinoff game series.

Aside from throwing the opponent or wearing away their health by using special moves, a way to fight blocking is the "Guard Break". The Guard Break is a move that, if it connects with the blocking opponent, breaks the block and makes the opponent dizzy. The Guard Break can be used at any time with one level of the Super Combo gauge. This is also a SF mechanic but in Alpha, the guard break simply results in an opening, while EX guard break is more like a stun.

A special move can be done after a regular move or another special move; this is called "Canceling". In the process of doing a Super Combo, another Super Combo can be performed. This is called "Super Canceling" and can be done with Super Combos. This allows a player to string multiple super combos together for monumental damage.

== Versions and characters ==
The original Street Fighter EX features 17 characters (two of them being computer-controlled bosses), growing to 23 for the home release. With a total of 19 new characters in the three games of the Street Fighter EX series, this represents the largest original set of characters introduced in a single Street Fighter series. Several of these characters would appear in other games produced by Arika, such as Fighting EX Layer.

=== Introduced in Street Fighter EX ===
Alongside new characters developed exclusively for the game, several mainline Street Fighter characters also appear in the game: Ryu, Ken Masters, Chun-Li, Zangief, Guile, M. Bison (who is an unplayable boss), and Akuma (who is a secret character).

- Allen Snider (アレン・スナイダー, Aren Sunaidā) appears as a secret character in the original Street Fighter EX and as a regular character in Street Fighter EX Plus and EX Plus α. He is a fighter who was said to be the strongest freestyle karate fighter on the American karate circuit, until he experienced his first defeat against a young Ken Masters at the All-American Martial Arts Tournament. Ken told Allen that he was only a "big fish in a small pond". Motivated by these words, Allen sets out to prove that he can be the best not only in America, but in the world. Although absent in Street Fighter EX2 and subsequent games, he makes an appearance in the Arika-developed arcade game Fighting Layer, where he seeks to defeat the strongest opponent on South Island. Allen returns in Fighting EX Layer, determined to defeat the recently revived Garuda to prove himself. He is voiced by Osamu Hosoi in the EX series, and Daisuke Yokota in Fighting EX Layer.
- Blair Dame (ブレア・デイム, Burea Deimu) appears as a secret character in the original Street Fighter EX and as a regular character in Street Fighter EX Plus and EX Plus α. She is the daughter of a wealthy European family. She fights wearing a light blue leotard and long boots. In addition to receiving a formal education, Blair has trained herself in various combat sports, believing that one day she will need to know how to defend her loved ones as well as herself. She travels the world to hone her skills with her bodyguard Cracker Jack, whom her mother has hired to protect her. Blair is acquainted with Pullum, as they are both members of the International Debutante Club. Her butler is called Sebastian. Like Allen, Blair appears in Arika's arcade fighting game Fighting Layer, in which she takes a sudden trip to South Island. She is also mentioned in Jack's ending in Street Fighter EX3. Blair is a playable character in Fighting EX Layer, hiring Vulcano Rosso to help her search for Jack after he flees to America. She is voiced by Hikari Tachibana in the EX series, and Rui Tanabe in Fighting EX Layer.
- Cracker Jack (クラッカー・ジャック, Kurakkā Jakku), is a bat-wielding former bouncer from Las Vegas, known for his unstoppable punches. While being pursued by an unknown organization, he becomes Blair's bodyguard to travel the world and flee his pursuers. In Street Fighter EX2, his younger sister is kidnapped by an underground fighting champion named Bharat. In Street Fighter EX2 Plus, he continues to be pursued by the mysterious organization, and by the end of Street Fighter EX3 he seeks refuge in Blair's mansion. In Fighting EX Layer, Jack escapes the organization by leaving Blair's employ and fleeing to America. He is voiced by Banjō Ginga in the EX series, and Yoshimitsu Shimoyama in Fighting EX Layer.
- Darun Mister (ダラン・マイスター, Daran Maisutā) appears as a secret character in the original Street Fighter EX and as a regular character in Street Fighter EX Plus and EX Plus α. He is a popular wrestling champion from India who seeks to challenge other wrestlers such as Zangief and Victor Ortega (from the Saturday Night Slam Masters series). He agrees to become Pullum Purna's bodyguard, hoping to use the opportunity to travel the world and fight many wrestlers. He is absent from the original Street Fighter EX2, but returns in Street Fighter EX2 Plus, in which he obtains another opportunity to fight against more wrestlers around the world after Pullum becomes a princess. In Street Fighter EX3, he has a special ending if the player finishes the single-player mode with Zangief as his tag-partner. In Fighting EX Layer, Darun is nearly killed by Garuda, so he resigns from being Pullum's bodyguard so he can train to defeat the demon. He is voiced by Takashi Nagasako.
- Doctrine Dark (ドクトリン・ダーク, Dokutorin Dāku), whose real name is Holger (オルガー, Orugā), is a German-American mercenary seeking revenge against Guile. His back-story for Street Fighter EX2 establishes that he was raised in a mercenary training facility, where he was trained in the use of weapons similar to Rolento's, such as knives, grenades, and wires. Dark once served in the American armed forces. He was in a special forces unit led by Guile when it became involved in a scuffle against a rival unit led by Rolento. Holger was the sole survivor of his unit, but suffered tremendous physical and mental scars. He seeks revenge against Guile, feeling that he did not train him sufficiently. During the development of Street Fighter EX, the developers nicknamed him "Mr. Foul-play" (反則くん, Hansoku-kun). In July 2011, a video from an Arika 3DS test project, called Fighting Sample, was released featuring Dark. In Fighting EX Layer, Dark is influenced by Garuda's negative energy into becoming a serial killer. He is voiced by Wataru Takagi.
- Garuda (ガルダ) appears as a non-playable boss character in the original Street Fighter EX but becomes a playable character in Street Fighter EX Plus and EX Plus α. Built around the concept of "a badass with a sword hidden on his back". According to his back-story in the original Street Fighter EX, he was created by the souls of dead men who were consumed by the Satsui no Hadō, although his revised back-story in Street Fighter EX2 suggests that he has an accumulation of negative feelings such as anger, hatred, envy, treachery, and despair. Garuda's form is said to change depending on his opponent: he takes a strong form against warriors seeking strength and feeds on the hatred of warriors who are seeking vengeance. Garuda returns as the antagonist of Fighting EX Layer, revived by absorbing Kairi's negative energy.
- Hokuto (ほくと) is the daughter of the Mizugami (水神) family, who was trained in the family's style of kobujutsu, which has been refined into her personal style that resembles the art of aikijujutsu. She was known as Shirase (しらせ) as a child. When Hokuto turned 17, she was sent on a journey to find her older half-brother Kairi, who went missing years before. Unknown to Hokuto, the true purpose of her journey was not only to find her brother, but to defeat him. She has been implanted with the "Seal of Blood" (血の封印, Chi no Fūin) to exterminate her brother. In the original Street Fighter EX, Hokuto wears a blue-white outfit resembling that of a Japanese archer, and white hachimaki around her long hair. In EX2, she wears a hakama and ties her hair in a pony-tail. She reverts to her original design in EX3. In addition to her regular version, an alternate version named Bloody Hokuto (血の封印を解かれたほくと, Chi no Fūin Tokareta Hokuto; "Hokuto with the Seal of Blood Broken") is featured as secret character in Street Fighter EX Plus. Bloody Hokuto returns in Fighting EX Layer, now going by her original name of Shirase. Hokuto also appears as a playable character, though her ending reveals her to actually be Nanase, having been brainwashed into believing she is Hokuto. She is voiced by Yuri Amano in the EX series, and Yuka Igarashi in Fighting EX Layer.
- Kairi (カイリ) appears as a secret character in the original Street Fighter EX and as a regular character in Street Fighter EX Plus and EX Plus α. He is depicted as an amnesiac who was initially conceived to be the main character in the EX series. Kairi was born to the main house of the Mizukami family and was trained in the family's traditional art of karate. He appears in the original EX and its re-releases with long black hair and a scar over his left eye. He lost his memories while fighting an unknown challenger and now walks the "Path of the Shura", fighting to survive. He learns that he is the elder brother of Hokuto, who has been on a mission to find him. In EX2, his hair has changed from black to white as a result of his constant battles. After confronting Hokuto and Nanase, he recovers his memories and learns that he was responsible for the death of their father. Kairi returns as the protagonist of Fighting EX Layer, fighting to defeat Garuda after accidentally breaking the seal preventing his rebirth. He is voiced by Kaneto Shiozawa in the EX series, and Yoshitaka Kure in Fighting EX Layer.
- Pullum Purna (プルム・プルナ, Purumu Puruna; Arabic: برم برنا) is the daughter of Balba Purna, an Arab multimillionaire and inventor. She decides to travel the world with her bodyguard Darun when she overhears her grandfather whisper the name "Shadaloo", believing that it is the name of a person. Unknown to Pullum, the reason why her grandfather is worried about Shadaloo is that she has a blood relative working for the organization who is a candidate to become a Shadaloo executive. She is absent from the original Street Fighter EX2 but returns in Street Fighter EX2 Plus, in which she inherits a kingdom after the death of a relative and decides to travel the world once again with Darun to search for her missing father. Pullum's theme tune was later used in the game Technictix. Pullum returns as a downloadable character in Fighting EX Layer, following a new clue to the whereabouts of her missing father. She is voiced by Chika Sakamoto.
- Skullomania (スカロマニア, Sukaromania) is the secret identity of Saburo Nishikoyama (西小山 三郎, Nishikoyama Saburō), a third-rate businessman from Tokyo who works to support his wife and children. He adopts his superhero identity when a client asks him to dress up and pose for a superhero attraction at his department store. Donning a full-body skeleton suit, Skullomania sets out to fight evil for real. In Street Fighter EX2, his costume is redesigned, adding a red scarf and a red letter "S" in front of his mask, along with white gloves and boots and a belt. Skullomania reappears in Fighting EX Layer, having settled back into life as a salaryman but finding himself unexpectedly transforming into his superhero persona without any memory of doing so afterward. With new powers also developing as well, he sets out to find the reason behind these sudden changes. He makes later appearances in the PlayStation 2 music game Technictix and in Fighter Maker. A female version of Skullomania appears as a special guest character in SNK Heroines: Tag Team Frenzy. He is voiced by Issei Futamata, with the exception of SNK Heroines, where the character is voiced by Yūko Kaida.

=== Introduced in Street Fighter EX Plus ===
A few months after the original version of Street Fighter EX was released, an upgraded version titled Street Fighter EX Plus was released in arcades on March 31, 1997. In this version, all of the secret time-released characters are available by default, as well as Garuda and M. Bison, who were exclusively computer-controlled in the original game. This version also adds four new secret characters, increasing the total number of playable characters to 21: Evil Ryu from Street Fighter Alpha 2, an alternate version of Hokuto named Bloody Hokuto, and two cyborgs named Cycloid-β and Cycloid-γ.

- Cycloid-β (サイクロイド-β, Saikuroido Bēta) and Cycloid-γ (サイクロイド-γ, Saikuroido Ganma) are a pair of cyborgs that use the special techniques of other characters. Beta primarily uses command-based special moves, while Gamma specializes in charge-based moves. Both characters were based on test models used for motion capture during the development of the game. Beta is an untextured blue polygonal model resembling a male human, and Gamma is a green wireframed model. In the Japanese version of Street Fighter EX Plus α for the PlayStation, Gamma is given an additional back-story, a weapon secretly developed by Pullum's father Balba to annihilate a huge criminal organization. In Street Fighter EX2 Plus, an unidentified Cycloid model appears in one of the bonus rounds.

=== Introduced in Street Fighter EX Plus α ===
The PlayStation version of the game, titled Street Fighter EX Plus Alpha and promoted as Street Fighter EX Plus α, was released on July 17, 1997. All of the characters from the arcade version of EX Plus are included, along with two characters exclusive to this version, returning Street Fighter characters Dhalsim and Sakura, increasing the total number of playable characters to 23. In addition, there is a hidden bonus stage where the player has to smash barrels, similar to one of the three bonus stages from Street Fighter II. This version also includes several game modes in addition to the Arcade mode: a dedicated two-player Versus mode, Practice mode, Team Battle mode, Survival mode, Time Attack mode, and Watch mode where the player witnesses a match between two computer-controlled characters. It also includes an arranged soundtrack and CG animated endings for all of the characters.

== Development ==
Development of the game was headed by Akira Nishitani, best known for his work on Street Fighter II. Though the gaming media had widely perceived Capcom's first in-house polygonal fighting game, Star Gladiator, as a warm-up for their first polygonal Street Fighter game, Arika did not consult with the Star Gladiator team in making Street Fighter EX. Arika vice president Ichiro Mihara explained, "In specific terms, it's a different development line. In addition, technically, it's completely different. The know-how we're using for this 2D/3D fighting game has no relation to Star Gladiator. Fundamentally, Arika is not a subsidiary company of Capcom. ... Some people may be under the impression that as we came from Capcom, there's some sort of link between us but in reality it's a different team making a different game. The concept is new and the know-how is new."

A Nintendo 64 port was also announced for release in 1997, but later cancelled.

== Soundtrack ==
The music was written by former Namco composers, Takayuki Aihara, Shinji Hosoe, and Ayako Saso. The themes are predominantly jazz fusion, with rock and electronic dance music elements. Entitled Street Fighter EX－SCITRON 1500 SERIES, the complete 20-track CD album was released on February 21, 1997 by Pony Canyon, complete with a 19-track voice collection. The 13-track live band CD Street Fighter EX Arrange Sound Trax was released on March 5, 1997, with a drama CD released on March 21 of the same year, all by Pony Canyon.

== Reception ==
=== Critical reaction ===
Reception

Aggregate score
Aggregator	Score
GameRankings	86% (PS)

Review scores
Publication	Score
Computer and Video Games	5/5 (PS)
Electronic Gaming Monthly	8.5/10 (PS)
GameSpot	8.3/10 (PS)
IGN	8.3/10(PS)
Next Generation	2/5 (ARC); 4/5 (PS)
PlayStation: The Official Magazine	8/10 (PS)
Electric Playground	9.5/10 (PS)

Award
Publication	Award
PSM	9th best PlayStation game of all time

A reviewer for Next Generation commended Capcom for bringing the Street Fighter series into 3D, but judged Street Fighter EX to be an ultimately failed attempt. He remarked that while the characters are evenly balanced and have a handful of innovative moves, "The game plays more like a distant cousin to the Street Fighter series" and is simply not as fun. He also found the animations and backgrounds to not be up to Street Fighter standards.

The expanded PlayStation version was much more positively received. Next Generation explained that it had far exceeded the arcade version by adding new characters and new gameplay modes, as well as correcting the feel, and called it "an outstanding title even non-SF devotees will enjoy." Both Next Generation and GameSpot assured readers that the look of the old characters had been faithfully translated to polygonal form, and critics generally approved of the series' transition to polygonal graphics. Dan Hsu of Electronic Gaming Monthly said it was "What should've been called Street Fighter III" rather than the sprite-based game released under that name, and co-reviewer Howard Grossman said it "has the attraction of 3-D looks, 2-D playability and great options!" GameSpot described it as "a fun game with great gameplay, better than average aesthetics, and a large number of characters" and "a 3D Street Fighter game worthy of its heritage." The Official UK PlayStation Magazine said that the "gameplay is as recognisable as the Taj Mahal", and that it was "the most fun we've ever had with Streetfighting since Turbo", rating the lifespan as 10/10. They concluded "this is like a second honeymoon. The true master of martial arts games remains unrivalled." IGN's Jason Boor stated "this is one of the best Street Fighters I've ever played, and I think it's a good switch. It's still a 2D fighter, but it looks a whole lot better." GamePro similarly said that it "adds a cool polygonal 3D look to the classic game while keeping the fun, basic gameplay that's made the series one of the fighting genre's all-time best."

Critics also overwhelmingly liked the new characters the game introduced, with Next Generation describing them as "very playable and distinct" and Ed Lomas writing in Computer and Video Games that they "start to grow on you before long - especially Skullo." The most common reservation critics had was that the game did not do quite enough to change up the technique from previous Street Fighter games. Hsu said that while there were enough changes in the moves and timing to challenge Street Fighter veterans, he was disappointed that the new characters all used the traditional fireball and dragon punch joypad motions, and GamePro likewise opined that it made them feel like "Ken and Ryu clones."

The PlayStation version was a runner-up for "Fighting Game of the Year" (behind Street Fighter Collection) at Electronic Gaming Monthly's 1997 Editors' Choice Awards. In 1998 PlayStation: The Official Magazine listed it as number 9 on their "best PlayStation games of all time". The PlayStation version also received a nomination for "Console Fighting Game of the Year" during the AIAS' inaugural Interactive Achievement Awards.

=== Commercial ===
In Japan, Game Machine listed Street Fighter EX on their February 15, 1997 issue as being the second most-successful arcade game of the month. Game Machine also listed Street Fighter EX Plus on their May 15, 1997 issue as being the sixth most-successful arcade game of the month. In North America, the arcade version saw limited distribution.

The PlayStation version sold over 400,000 total copies worldwide after its first year on sale, qualifying for the Platinum Range.

== Sequels ==
A sequel to Street Fighter EX, Street Fighter EX2, was released on May 26, 1998. It was also followed by an upgraded version titled Street Fighter EX2 Plus, which was released in arcades and ported to the PlayStation in 1999. The third game in the series, Street Fighter EX3, was released exclusively for the PlayStation 2 on March 4, 2000. The Street Fighter EX games all run at a vertical resolution of 480 lines, which made them the only Street Fighter games to run at a definition above 256 lines until the release of Street Fighter IV (which also has 3D graphics) in 2008.

Both Allen Snider and Blair Dane appear in Arika's arcade exclusive fighting game, Fighting Layer, released in Japan by Namco in 1998.

In early 2017, Arika announced that a new fighting game was in development with the working title "Arika EX". On April 1, 2017, a teaser for a new title featuring the Street Fighter EX characters was released, which was initially believed to be an April Fool's joke. It was later revealed that the game was indeed in development and that more information would be revealed during EVO 2017. The game was released in June 2018 under the name Fighting EX Layer.
