= Fighting Layer =

1998 video game

Fighting Layer ファイティングレイヤー
- Developer: Arika
- Publisher: Namco
- Composers: Takayuki Aihara; Ayako Saso
- Platform: Arcade
- Release: December 1998
- Genre: Fighting game
- Modes: Single-player, Multiplayer
- Arcade system: Namco System 12

Fighting Layer is a 3D arcade fighting game developed by Arika and published by Namco, built on the Namco System 12 arcade hardware. The game was released in December 1998; it has never been ported to any home consoles. Fighting Layer is built upon the Street Fighter EX series, which was also developed by Arika. A spiritual sequel, Fighting EX Layer, was released in 2018.

== Gameplay ==
Gameplay screenshot

The gameplay system is similar to that of the Street Fighter EX series, such as canceling supers into other supers, and universal guard-break attacks. Unlike in the Street Fighter EX series, fighters can now dash forward or backward by tapping the directions twice and fighters can now also side step with a specific button combination. This game also introduces two new mechanics. One where players can perform safe falls to keep from hitting the ground and the other making their fighter dodge and charge up their super gauge to its maximum.

== Characters ==
Two of the game's characters, Allen Snider and Blair Dame, previously appeared in Street Fighter EX.

- Allen Snider
- Blair Dame
- Capriccio
- Exodus
- George Jensent
- Hong Gillson
- Janis Luciani
- Jig Jid Bartol
- Lan Yinghua
- Sessyu Tsukikage
- Shang Fenghuang
- Tetsuo Kato
- Knight (Note: Non-playable boss character)
- Shin Knight
- Falcon
- Shark
- Tiger
- Clemence Keliber (Note: Character unlocked through time release)
- Joe Fendi
- Preston Ajax
- Vold Ignitio

== Reception ==
In Japan, Game Machine listed Fighting Layer on their February 1, 1999 issue as being the eleventh most-successful arcade game of the month.
