= Akira Yasuda =

Japanese animator, character designer, game designer, and mecha designer

- 安田 朗
- Born: July 21, 1964 (age 62); Kushiro, Hokkaido, Japan
- Other name: Akiman
- Education: Tokyo Design Academy
- Occupations: animator, character designer, game designer
- Years active: 1985–present
- Employer: Capcom (1985–2003)

Akira Yasuda (安田 朗, Yasuda Akira) (born July 21, 1964) is a Japanese animator, character designer, game designer and mecha designer, who works under the pseudonym Akiman. Yasuda is a former employee of the video game company Capcom (joining in 1985) and has worked on many Capcom games, taking on various design roles for works such as the Final Fight series and Street Fighter II: The World Warrior (including their updates). He has also been involved in anime production, most notably Turn A Gundam, Overman King Gainer and Code Geass. He also went to the United States to work on Red Dead Revolver for Angel Studios. When the studio was bought by Rockstar Games, he returned to Japan, where he officially left Capcom in 2003 and started working as a freelance artist.

== Notable works ==
=== Anime ===
- Turn A Gundam (1999–2000) - character designer
- Overman King Gainer (2002–2003) - mecha designer
- Code Geass (2006–2007) - mecha designer
- Bodacious Space Pirates (2008–present) - animation character design
- Gundam Reconguista in G (2014–2015) - mecha designer

=== Video games ===
- 1942 (1985) - NES version cover art
- Hyper Dyne Side Arms (1986) - original artwork
- Forgotten Worlds (1988) - game designer
- Final Fight (1989) - planner
- Street Fighter II (series) (1991) - planner
- Captain Commando (1991) - planner
- The Punisher (1993)
- Super Street Fighter II (1993) - planner
- Darkstalkers: The Night Warriors (1994)
- X-Men: Children of the Atom (1994)
- Darkstalkers 3 (1997)
- Marvel Super Heroes (1995) - object design: Wolverine
- Street Fighter Alpha 2 (1996)
- Star Gladiator (1996) - character designer
- X-Men vs. Street Fighter (1996) - character designer
- Red Earth (1996) - original artwork
- Street Fighter III (1997) - original artwork
- Marvel Super Heroes vs. Street Fighter (1997) - original artwork
- Marvel vs. Capcom: Clash of Super Heroes (1998) - original artwork
- Plasma Sword: Nightmare of Bilstein (1998) - character designer
- Street Fighter Alpha 3 (1998) - character designer
- Power Stone (1999) - character designer
- Street Fighter III: 3rd Strike (1999) - character designer
- Final Fight Revenge (1999)
- Tech Romancer (2000) - design supervisor
- Power Stone 2 (2000) - character designer
- Red Dead Revolver (2004) - character designer
- MS Saga: A New Dawn (2005) - main character & package design
- Culdcept Saga (2006) - card illustration: Sword Princess
- Mystery Dungeon: Shiren the Wanderer DS (2006) - cover art and character art
- Brave Story: New Traveler (2006)- character designer
- Sangokushi Taisen DS (2007) - card illustration: Enclosure Empress
- Kidou Senshi Gundam: Giren no Yabou - Axis no Kyoui V (2009) - cover art
- Super Smash Bros. for Nintendo 3DS and Wii U (Ryu character illustration)
- Star Ocean: Integrity and Faithlessness (2016) - character designer
- Street Fighter V (2016) - guest alternate costume designer
- Star Ocean: Anamnesis (2016) - character designer
- Star Ocean: The Divine Force (2022) - character designer

=== Other works ===
- Tomie: Re-birth (2001 film; cameo appearance as Waiter)
- ∀ Gundam: Wind of Moon (∀ Gundam: Tsuki no Kaze, 2004–2005) (manga)
- Giga69 (magazine cover art)
- Akira Yasuda ∀ Gundam Designs (∀ Gundam series artbook)
- Akiman Cover Girls (poster book of Giga69 magazine covers)
- "Haji" DVD cover (included in "[nine*nine]" live audio compilation by Gackt, Oct. 29, 2008)
- Kousoku M-ko figurine (character design and insert comic)
- Eureka Magazine (magazine cover art)
- Street Fighter Art Comic Anthology (cover art)
- Street Fighter Artworks HA 20th Anniversary Art Book (cover art)
- Gundam Rock Music Album (cover art)
