= List of Street Fighter media =

Street Fighter is a series of fighting video games developed and published by Japanese company Capcom. The series debuted in Japan in August 1987 with the arcade game Street Fighter, and is one of Capcom's best-selling franchises with over 33 million units sold. The games take place in a fictional universe in which a range of characters compete in fighting tournaments for prizes and bragging rights, and have been released on numerous video game consoles, handheld game consoles, personal computer platforms, and mobile devices. Related comic books, films, and other dramatizations have also been released, in addition to soundtrack albums associated with many of the main games.

== Video games ==
=== Main numbered series ===
| Game | Details |
|---|---|
| Street Fighter Original release dates: JP: August 1987; NA: 1987; EU: 1988 | Release years by system: 1987 – Arcade; 1988 – Commodore 64, Atari ST, Microsoft Windows, Amiga, Amstrad CPC, ZX Spectrum TurboGrafx-CD |
| Street Fighter Original release dates: JP: August 1987; NA: 1987; EU: 1988 | Notes: The arcade version was not released in Europe; The Commodore 64 version was not released in Japan; The Atari ST and Microsoft Windows versions were released in North America only; The Amiga, Amstrad CPC and ZX Spectrum versions were released in Europe only; The TurboGrafx-CD port was called Fighting Street |
| Street Fighter II Original release dates: JP: March 1991; NA: 1991; EU: 1992 | Release years by system: 1991 – Arcade; 1992 – Super Nintendo Entertainment System, Microsoft Windows, Amiga, Atari ST, Commodore 64, ZX Spectrum; 1994 – CPS Changer, FM Towns; 1995 – Game Boy; 1997 – Master System; 2004 – Mobile phone |
| Street Fighter II Original release dates: JP: March 1991; NA: 1991; EU: 1992 | Notes: The arcade version is entitled Street Fighter II: The World Warrior, and was not released in Europe; The Microsoft Windows version was not released in Japan; The Amiga, Atari ST, Commodore 64 and ZX Spectrum versions were released in Europe only; The CPS Changer, FM Towns and mobile phone versions were released in Japan only; The Master System version was released in South America only |
| Street Fighter III: New Generation Original release dates: JP: February 1997; NA: 1997 | Release years by system: 1997 – Arcade |
| Street Fighter IV Original release dates: JP: July 18, 2008; NA: February 17, 2009; AU: February 19, 2009; EU: February 20, 2009 | Release years by system: 2008 – Arcade; 2009 – PlayStation 3, Xbox 360, Microsoft Windows; 2010 – iOS |
| Street Fighter IV Original release dates: JP: July 18, 2008; NA: February 17, 2009; AU: February 19, 2009; EU: February 20, 2009 | Notes: The arcade version was released in Japan only; The iOS version was not released in Australia |
| Street Fighter V Original release date: WW: February 16, 2016 | Release years by system: 2016 – PlayStation 4, Microsoft Windows; 2019 – Arcade (Japan only) |
| Street Fighter V Original release date: WW: February 16, 2016 | Notes: The arcade version will be released in Japan only |
| Street Fighter 6 Original release date: WW: June 2, 2023 | Release years by system: 2023 – PlayStation 4, PlayStation 5, Xbox Series X/S, Microsoft Windows, Arcade (Japan only); 2025 – Nintendo Switch 2 |
| Street Fighter 6 Original release date: WW: June 2, 2023 | Notes: The arcade version will be released in Japan only |

=== Sequels and remakes ===
| Game | Details |
|---|---|
| Street Fighter II': Champion Edition Original release dates: JP: April 1992; NA: 1992; EU: October 1993 | Release years by system: 1992 – Arcade; 1993 – Genesis/Mega Drive, TurboGrafx-16, X68000; 2008 – Mobile phone |
| Street Fighter II': Champion Edition Original release dates: JP: April 1992; NA: 1992; EU: October 1993 | Notes: An enhanced remake of Street Fighter II (1991); The arcade version was not released in Europe; The Genesis/Mega Drive version is known in North America and Europe as Street Fighter II': Special Champion Edition, and in Japan as Street Fighter II' Plus: Champion Edition; The TurboGrafx-16 and X68000 versions were released in Japan only; The mobile phone version was released in North America only |
| Street Fighter II: Hyper Fighting Original release dates: JP: December 1992; NA: 1992; EU: August 2, 2006 | Release years by system: 1992 – Arcade; 2006 – Xbox 360 (Live Arcade) |
| Street Fighter II: Hyper Fighting Original release dates: JP: December 1992; NA: 1992; EU: August 2, 2006 | Notes: An enhanced remake of Street Fighter II (1991); The arcade version was not released in Europe; The Xbox 360 version was not released in Japan |
| Street Fighter II': Rainbow Edition Original release date: NA: 1993 | Release years by system: 1993 – Arcade |
| Street Fighter II': Rainbow Edition Original release date: NA: 1993 | Notes: An enhanced remake of Street Fighter II (1991) |
| Super Street Fighter II Original release dates: JP: October 1993; NA: 1993; EU: 1993 | Release years by system: 1993 – Arcade; 1994 – Genesis/Mega Drive, Super NES, X68000; 1995 – Amiga; 1996 – Microsoft Windows; 2009 – BlackBerry |
| Super Street Fighter II Original release dates: JP: October 1993; NA: 1993; EU: 1993 | Notes: An enhanced remake of Street Fighter II (1991); The arcade, Amiga, Microsoft Windows, and all Japanese versions are entitled Super Street Fighter II: The New Challengers; The X68000 version was released in Japan only; The Amiga version was released in Europe only; The Windows and BlackBerry versions were released in North America only; The BlackBerry version is a mobile remake entitled Super Street Fighter II: The New Challengers |
| Super Street Fighter II Turbo Original release dates: NA: March 23, 1994; JP: March 1994; EU: 1994 | Release years by system: 1994 – Arcade, 3DO Interactive Multiplayer; 1995 – Microsoft Windows, Amiga (North America); 1996 – Amiga (Europe), Amiga CD32; 2000 – Dreamcast; 2001 – Game Boy Advance; 2008 – PlayStation 3 (PlayStation Network) (North America), Xbox 360 (Live Arcade); 2009 – PlayStation 3 (PlayStation Network) (Europe) |
| Super Street Fighter II Turbo Original release dates: NA: March 23, 1994; JP: March 1994; EU: 1994 | Notes: An enhanced remake of Super Street Fighter II (1993); The arcade version is known in Japan as Super Street Fighter II X: Grand Master Challenge, and was not released in Europe; The 3DO version is known in Japan as Super Street Fighter II X; The Microsoft Windows version was released in North America only; The Amiga version was not released in Japan; The Amiga CD32 version was released in Europe only; The Dreamcast version is entitled Super Street Fighter II X for Matching Service, and was released in Japan only; The Game Boy Advance version is a portable remake entitled Super Street Fighter II Turbo: Revival (Super Street Fighter II X: Revival in Japan); The PlayStation 3 and Xbox 360 versions are enhanced remakes entitled Super Street Fighter II Turbo HD Remix |
| Street Fighter III: 2nd Impact Original release dates: JP: October 1997; NA: 1998; EU: September 15, 2000 | Release years by system: 1997 – Arcade (Japan); 1998 – Arcade (North America); 1999 – Dreamcast (Japan); 2000 – Dreamcast (North America and Europe) |
| Street Fighter III: 2nd Impact Original release dates: JP: October 1997; NA: 1998; EU: September 15, 2000 | Notes: An enhanced remake of Street Fighter III: New Generation (1997); Known in Japan as Street Fighter III: W Impact; The arcade version is entitled Street Fighter III: 2nd Impact – Giant Attack, and was not released in Europe |
| Street Fighter III: 3rd Strike Original release dates: JP: May 1999; NA: 1999; EU: 2000 | Release years by system: 1999 – Arcade; 2000 – Dreamcast; 2004 – PlayStation 2; 2011 – PlayStation 3 (PlayStation Network), Xbox 360 (Live Arcade) |
| Street Fighter III: 3rd Strike Original release dates: JP: May 1999; NA: 1999; EU: 2000 | Notes: An enhanced remake of Street Fighter III: New Generation (1997); The arcade version is entitled Street Fighter III: 3rd Strike – Fight for the Future, and was not released in Europe; The PlayStation 2 version was released in Japan only; The PlayStation 3 and Xbox 360 versions are enhanced remakes entitled Street Fighter III: 3rd Strike Online Edition |
| Super Street Fighter IV Original release dates: NA: April 27, 2010; JP: April 28, 2010; AU: April 29, 2010; EU: April 30, 2010 | Release years by system: 2010 – PlayStation 3, Xbox 360, arcade 2011 – Nintendo 3DS, PlayStation 3, Xbox 360, Microsoft Windows |
| Super Street Fighter IV Original release dates: NA: April 27, 2010; JP: April 28, 2010; AU: April 29, 2010; EU: April 30, 2010 | Notes: An enhanced remake of Street Fighter IV (2008); The arcade version was released in Japan only; The Microsoft Windows version was not released in Japan or Australia; The arcade, 2011 PlayStation 3, 2011 Xbox 360, and Microsoft Windows versions are enhanced remakes entitled Super Street Fighter IV: Arcade Edition; The Nintendo 3DS version is a portable remake entitled Super Street Fighter IV: 3D Edition |
| Street Fighter IV Volt Original release date: NA: June 30, 2011 | Release years by system: 2011 – iOS |
| Street Fighter IV Volt Original release date: NA: June 30, 2011 | Notes: A mobile remake of Street Fighter IV (2008) |
| Street Fighter IV Champion Edition Original release date: NA: July 12, 2017 | Release years by system: 2017 – iOS |
| Street Fighter IV Champion Edition Original release date: NA: July 12, 2017 | Notes: A mobile remake of Street Fighter IV (2008) |

=== Spin-offs and crossovers ===
| Game | Details |
|---|---|
| Street Fighter 2010: The Final Fight Original release dates: JP: August 8, 1990; NA: September 1990 | Release years by system: 1990 – Nintendo Entertainment System |
| Street Fighter 2010: The Final Fight Original release dates: JP: August 8, 1990; NA: September 1990 | Notes: Known in Japan as 2010: Street Fighter |
| Street Fighter: The Movie Original release dates: JP: June 1995; NA: 1995 | Release years by system: 1995 – Arcade |
| Street Fighter: The Movie Original release dates: JP: June 1995; NA: 1995 | Notes: An arcade game adaptation of the film Street Fighter (1994) |
| Street Fighter: The Movie Original release dates: NA: August 10, 1995; JP: August 11, 1995; EU: September 1995 | Release years by system: 1995 – PlayStation, Sega Saturn |
| Street Fighter: The Movie Original release dates: NA: August 10, 1995; JP: August 11, 1995; EU: September 1995 | Notes: A video game adaptation of the film Street Fighter (1994); Known in Japan as Street Fighter: Real Battle on Film |
| Street Fighter II Movie Original release date: JP: December 15, 1995 | Release years by system: 1995 – PlayStation; 1996 – Sega Saturn |
| Street Fighter II Movie Original release date: JP: December 15, 1995 | Notes: A video game adaptation of the film Street Fighter II: The Animated Movie (1995) |
| Super Puzzle Fighter II Turbo Original release dates: JP: June 1996; NA: June 1996; EU: July 1997 | Release years by system: 1996 – Arcade, PlayStation (North America and Japan), Sega Saturn (Japan); 1997 – PlayStation (Europe), Sega Saturn (North America and Europe); 2003 – Game Boy Advance; 2006 – Mobile phone 2007 – Xbox 360 (Live Arcade), PlayStation 3 (PlayStation Network) (North America); 2008 – PlayStation 3 (PlayStation Network) (Europe) |
| Super Puzzle Fighter II Turbo Original release dates: JP: June 1996; NA: June 1996; EU: July 1997 | Notes: Known in Japan as Super Puzzle Fighter II X; The arcade version was not released in Europe; The Game Boy Advance version is entitled Super Puzzle Fighter II; The Game Boy Advance and PlayStation 3 versions were not released in Japan; The mobile version is a remake entitled Super Puzzle Fighter II: Network Battle, and was released in North America only; The Xbox 360 and PlayStation 3 versions are enhanced remakes entitled Super Puzzle Fighter II Turbo HD Remix |
| X-Men vs. Street Fighter Original release dates: JP: September 1996; NA: 1996; EU: 1996 | Release years by system: 1996 – Arcade; 1997 – Sega Saturn (Japan); 1998 – PlayStation, Sega Saturn (North America) |
| X-Men vs. Street Fighter Original release dates: JP: September 1996; NA: 1996; EU: 1996 | Notes: The Sega Saturn version was not released in Europe; The PlayStation version is known in Japan as X-Men vs. Street Fighter EX Edition |
| Marvel Super Heroes vs. Street Fighter Original release dates: JP: July 1997; NA: 1997; EU: 1999 | Release years by system: 1997 – Arcade; 1998 – Sega Saturn; 1999 – PlayStation |
| Marvel Super Heroes vs. Street Fighter Original release dates: JP: July 1997; NA: 1997; EU: 1999 | Notes: The arcade version was not released in Europe; The Sega Saturn version was released in Japan only; The PlayStation version is known in Japan as Marvel Super Heroes vs. Street Fighter EX Edition |
| Super Street Fighter II Turbo Pinball FX Original release date: NA: November 13, 2008 | Release years by system: 2008 – Xbox 360 (Live Arcade) |
| Zen Pinball: Super Street Fighter II Turbo Original release date: NA: August 20, 2009 | Release years by system: 2009 – PlayStation 3 (PlayStation Network) |
| Street Fighters Bubble 2 Original release date: NA: September 20, 2011 | Release years by system: 2011 – iOS |
| Street Fighter X Tekken Original release dates: NA: March 6, 2012; JP: March 8, 2012; AU: March 8, 2012; EU: March 9, 2012 | Release years by system: 2012 – PlayStation 3, Xbox 360, Microsoft Windows, iOS, PlayStation Vita |
| Street Fighter X Tekken Original release dates: NA: March 6, 2012; JP: March 8, 2012; AU: March 8, 2012; EU: March 9, 2012 | Notes: The Microsoft Windows version was not released in Japan; The iOS version was released in North America only |
| Street Fighter X Tekken Gauntlet Original release date: NA: November 28, 2012 | Release years by system: 2012 – iOS |

==== Alpha series ====
| Game | Details |
|---|---|
| Street Fighter Alpha: Warrior's Dreams Original release dates: JP: June 1995; NA: 1995; EU: 1995 | Release years by system: 1995 – Arcade; 1996 – Sega Saturn, CPS Changer; 1999 – Game Boy Color (Europe); 2000 – Game Boy Color (North America), Microsoft Windows; 2001 – Game Boy Color (Japan); 2009 – BlackBerry, Windows Mobile |
| Street Fighter Alpha: Warrior's Dreams Original release dates: JP: June 1995; NA: 1995; EU: 1995 | Notes: Known in Japan as Street Fighter Zero; The CPS Changer version was released in Japan only; The Microsoft Windows, BlackBerry and Windows Mobile versions were released in North America only |
| Street Fighter Alpha 2 Original release dates: JP: March 1996; NA: 1996; EU: December 1996 | Release years by system: 1996 – Arcade, PlayStation, Sega Saturn, Super Nintendo Entertainment System; 1997 – Microsoft Windows (North America); 1998 – Microsoft Windows (Europe) |
| Street Fighter Alpha 2 Original release dates: JP: March 1996; NA: 1996; EU: December 1996 | Notes: Known in Japan as Street Fighter Zero 2; The arcade version was not released in Europe; The Microsoft Windows version was not released in Japan; An enhanced remake entitled Street Fighter Zero 2 Alpha was released for arcades in Japan in August 1996 |
| Street Fighter Alpha 3 Original release dates: JP: July 1998; NA: 1998; EU: 2000 | Release years by system: 1998 – Arcade, PlayStation (Japan); 1999 – PlayStation (North America), Dreamcast (Japan), Sega Saturn; 2000 – PlayStation (Europe), Dreamcast (North America and Europe); 2001 – Arcade; 2002 – Game Boy Advance; 2006 – PlayStation Portable |
| Street Fighter Alpha 3 Original release dates: JP: July 1998; NA: 1998; EU: 2000 | Notes: Known in Japan as Street Fighter Zero 3; The 1998 arcade version was not released in Europe; The Dreamcast version is known in Japan as Street Fighter Zero 3: Saikyooryuu Doujou; The Sega Saturn version was released in Japan only; The 2001 arcade version is an enhanced remake known as Street Fighter Zero 3 Upper, and was released in Japan only; The Game Boy Advance version is known in Japan as Street Fighter Zero 3 Upper; The PlayStation Portable version is an enhanced remake entitled Street Fighter Alpha 3 MAX (Street Fighter Zero 3 Double Upper in Japan) |
| Street Fighter Alpha: Maximum Blow Original release date: NA: September 1, 2004 | Release years by system: 2004 – Mobile phone |
| Street Fighter Alpha: Rapid Battle Original release date: NA: April 2, 2005 | Release years by system: 2005 – Mobile phone |

==== EX series ====
| Game | Details |
|---|---|
| Street Fighter EX Original release dates: NA: November 20, 1996; JP: December 1996; EU: November 1997 | Release years by system: 1996 – Arcade; 1997 – Arcade, PlayStation |
| Street Fighter EX Original release dates: NA: November 20, 1996; JP: December 1996; EU: November 1997 | Notes: The arcade versions were not released in Europe; The 1997 arcade version is an enhanced remake entitled Street Fighter EX Plus; The PlayStation version is an enhanced remake entitled Street Fighter EX Plus Alpha |
| Street Fighter EX2 Original release dates: JP: March 12, 1998; NA: May 26, 1998; EU: 1999 | Release years by system: 1998 – Arcade; 1999 – Arcade, PlayStation |
| Street Fighter EX2 Original release dates: JP: March 12, 1998; NA: May 26, 1998; EU: 1999 | Notes: The arcade versions were not released in Europe; The 1999 versions are enhanced remakes entitled Street Fighter EX2 Plus |
| Street Fighter EX3 Original release dates: JP: March 4, 2000; NA: October 24, 2000; EU: March 2, 2001 | Release years by system: 2000 – PlayStation 2 (Japan and North America); 2001 – PlayStation 2 (Europe) |

=== Compilations ===
| Game | Details |
|---|---|
| Street Fighter Series Original release date: NA: 1994 | Release years by system: 1994 – Microsoft Windows |
| Street Fighter Collection 2 Original release dates: NA: October 31, 1998; JP: December 3, 1998; EU: 1998 | Release years by system: 1998 – PlayStation |
| Street Fighter Collection 2 Original release dates: NA: October 31, 1998; JP: December 3, 1998; EU: 1998 | Notes: Contains Street Fighter II (1991), Street Fighter II: Champion Edition (1992), and Street Fighter II: Hyper Fighting (1992); Known in Japan as Capcom Generation 5: Dai 5 Shuu Kakkutouka Tachi |
| Street Fighter Anniversary Collection Original release dates: NA: August 31, 2004; JP: October 28, 2004; EU: October 29, 2004 | Release years by system: 2004 – PlayStation 2, Xbox (Japan and Europe); 2005 – Xbox (North America) |
| Street Fighter Anniversary Collection Original release dates: NA: August 31, 2004; JP: October 28, 2004; EU: October 29, 2004 | Notes: Contains Hyper Street Fighter II (2003) and Street Fighter III: 3rd Strike (1999); The PlayStation 2 version was not released in Japan |
| Street Fighter Alpha Anthology Original release dates: JP: May 25, 2006; NA: June 13, 2006; EU: July 7, 2006; AU: 2006 | Release years by system: 2006 – PlayStation 2 |
| Street Fighter Alpha Anthology Original release dates: JP: May 25, 2006; NA: June 13, 2006; EU: July 7, 2006; AU: 2006 | Notes: Contains Street Fighter Alpha (1995), Street Fighter Alpha 2 (1996), Street Fighter Alpha 3 (1998), Street Fighter Alpha 2 Gold (XXXX), and Super Gem Fighter Mini Mix (1997); Known in Japan as Street Fighter Zero: Fighters Generation |
| Street Fighter II Collection Original release date: NA: September 15, 2011 | Release years by system: 2011 – iOS |
| Street Fighter 25th Anniversary Collector Set Original release date: NA: September 18, 2012 | Release years by system: 2012 – PlayStation 3, Xbox 360 |
| Street Fighter 30th Anniversary Collection Original release dates: WW: May 29, 2018 | Release years by system: 2018 – Nintendo Switch, PlayStation 4, Xbox One, Windows |
| Street Fighter 30th Anniversary Collection Original release dates: WW: May 29, 2018 | Notes: Contains the arcade versions of Street Fighter (1987), Street Fighter II: The World Warrior (1991), Street Fighter II: Champion Edition (1992), Street Fighter II: Hyper Fighting (1993), Super Street Fighter II (1993), Super Street Fighter II Turbo (1994), Street Fighter Alpha (1995), Street Fighter Alpha 2 (1996), Street Fighter Alpha 3 (1998), Street Fighter III: New Generation (1997), Street Fighter III: 2nd Impact (1997), Street Fighter III: 3rd Strike (1999) |

== Other media ==
=== Films ===
| Game | Details |
|---|---|
| Street Fighter II: The Animated Movie Original release dates: JP: August 6, 1994; US: January 16, 1996 | Release years by system: 1994 – Film (Japan); 1996 – Film (United States); 1997 – DVD |
| Street Fighter II: The Animated Movie Original release dates: JP: August 6, 1994; US: January 16, 1996 | Notes: Anime film based on Street Fighter II directed by Gisaburō Sugii; Known in Japan as Sutorîto Faitâ II Gekijô-Ban |
| Street Fighter Original release dates: US: December 23, 1994; AU: January 12, 1995; UK: May 19, 1995 | Release years by system: 1994 – Film (United States and South Korea); 1995 – Film (Australia, South America and Europe) |
| Street Fighter Original release dates: US: December 23, 1994; AU: January 12, 1995; UK: May 19, 1995 | Notes: Live action film based on the Street Fighter series directed by Steven E. de Souza |
| Street Fighter Alpha Original release dates: JP: August 31, 2000; US: January 30, 2001 | Release years by system: 2000 – VHS (Japan); 2001 – VHS (United States), DVD |
| Street Fighter Alpha Original release dates: JP: August 31, 2000; US: January 30, 2001 | Notes: Anime film based on Street Fighter Alpha directed by Shigeyasu Yamauchi and Joe Romersa; Known in Japan as Street Fighter Zero |
| Street Fighter Alpha: Generations Original release date: US: October 25, 2005 | Release years by system: 2005 – VHS, DVD, UMD |
| Street Fighter Alpha: Generations Original release date: US: October 25, 2005 | Notes: Animated film based on Street Fighter Alpha directed by Ikuo Kuwana |
| Street Fighter IV: The Ties That Bind Original release dates: JP: February 12, 2009; US: February 17, 2009 | Release years by system: 2009 – DVD |
| Street Fighter IV: The Ties That Bind Original release dates: JP: February 12, 2009; US: February 17, 2009 | Notes: Anime film based on Street Fighter IV directed by Jirō Kanai; Known in Japan as Sutorîto Faitâ IV – Aratanaru Kizuna |
| Street Fighter: The Legend of Chun-Li Original release dates: JP: February 12, 2009; NA: February 27, 2009 | Release years by system: 2009 – Film; 2010 – DVD |
| Street Fighter: The Legend of Chun-Li Original release dates: JP: February 12, 2009; NA: February 27, 2009 | Notes: Live action film based on the Street Fighter series directed by Andrzej Bartkowiak |
| Street Fighter: Round One: Fight Original release date(s): | Release years by system: 2011 |
| Street Fighter: Round One: Fight Original release date(s): | Notes: Animated film based on the Street Fighter series directed by Joe Whiteaker |
| Street Fighter: Assassin's Fist Original release date(s): | Release years by system: 2014 |
| Street Fighter: Assassin's Fist Original release date(s): | Notes: Live action web series based on the Street Fighter series directed by Joey Ansah |
| Street Fighter Original release date(s): US: October 16, 2026 | Release years by system: 2026 |
| Street Fighter Original release date(s): US: October 16, 2026 | Notes: Live action film based on the Street Fighter series directed by Kitao Sakurai. |

=== Television series ===
| Game | Details |
|---|---|
| Street Fighter II V Original release date: JP: April 10, 1995 | Release years by system: 1995 – TV series 1998 – TV specials 2001 – DVD |
| Street Fighter II V Original release date: JP: April 10, 1995 | Notes: Anime television series based on Street Fighter II directed by Gisaburō Sugii |
| Street Fighter: The Animated Series Original release date: US: October 21, 1995 | Release years by system: 1995–1996 – TV series (season 1); 1996–1997 – TV series (season 2); 2003 – DVD |
| Street Fighter: The Animated Series Original release date: US: October 21, 1995 | Notes: Animated television series based on the Street Fighter series written by Will Meugniot and others |

=== Printed ===
| Game | Details |
|---|---|
| Street Fighter II Original release dates: JP: April 1993 (volume 1); JP: June 1993 (volume 2); JP: December 1994 (volume 3) | Release years by system: 1993 – Manga; 1994 – Manga |
| Street Fighter II Original release dates: JP: April 1993 (volume 1); JP: June 1993 (volume 2); JP: December 1994 (volume 3) | Notes: Manga series written and illustrated by Masaomi Kanzaki, and published by Tokuma Shoten |
| Super Street Fighter II Cammy Original release date: JP: 1994 | Release years by system: 1994 – Manga; 1997 – Graphic novel |
| Super Street Fighter II Cammy Original release date: JP: 1994 | Notes: Manga series written and illustrated by Masahiko Nakahira and published by Shogakukan |
| Street Fighter Alpha Original release dates: JP: February 10, 1996 (volume 1); JP: August 25, 1996 (volume 2) | Release years by system: 1996 – Manga; 2007 – Graphic novel |
| Street Fighter Alpha Original release dates: JP: February 10, 1996 (volume 1); JP: August 25, 1996 (volume 2) | Notes: Manga series written and illustrated by Masahiko Nakahira, and published by Shinseisha, 2007 - Graphic novel, ISBN 978-1897376508 |
| Street Fighter Gaiden Original release date: JP: April 1996 | Release years by system: 1996 – Manga |
| Street Fighter Gaiden Original release date: JP: April 1996 | Notes: Manga written and illustrated by Mami Itoh, and published by Shinseisha |
| Street Fighter: Sakura Ganbaru! Original release dates: JP: February 5, 1997 (volume 1); JP: August 5, 1997 (volume 2) | Release years by system: 1997 – Manga |
| Street Fighter: Sakura Ganbaru! Original release dates: JP: February 5, 1997 (volume 1); JP: August 5, 1997 (volume 2) | Notes: Manga series written and illustrated by Masahiko Nakahira, and published by Shinseisha |
| Street Fighter III: Ryu Final Original release dates: JP: February 10, 1999 (volume 1); JP: March 10, 1999 (volume 2) | Release years by system: 1999 – Manga |
| Street Fighter III: Ryu Final Original release dates: JP: February 10, 1999 (volume 1); JP: March 10, 1999 (volume 2) | Notes: Manga series written and illustrated by Masahiko Nakahira, and published by Shinseisha |
| Street Fighter: The Comic Series Original release date: US: August 2003 | Release years by system: 2003–2005 – Comic book |
| Street Fighter: The Comic Series Original release date: US: August 2003 | Notes: Comic book series published by UDON |

=== Music albums ===
| Title | Release date | Length | Label | Ref. |
|---|---|---|---|---|
| Street Fighter II: G.S.M. Capcom 4 | March 21, 1991 | 2:29:52 | Pony Canyon (PCCB-00056) | |
| Street Fighter II Image Album: G.S.M. Capcom | November 21, 1991 | 43:32 | Pony Canyon (PCCB-00075) | |
| Street Fighter II Nintendo Magazine System Promo | January 13, 1992 | 42:15 | Disctronics (CM 001) | |
| Capcom "Street Fighter II" CM Image Song: Battle Rascal | June 21, 1992 | 5:03 | Toy's Factory (TFDC-28011) | |
| Street Fighter II: Chun-Li Flying Legend | July 15, 1992 | 1:13:48 | Toshiba EMI (TOCT-6542) | |
| Street Fighter II Complete File | November 15, 1992 | 48:05 | Capcom (CAMPCOM-004) | |
| Sing!! Street Fighter II | December 16, 1992 | 50:06 | Pony Canyon (PCCB-00103) | |
| Street Fighter II: Mad Revenger Vengeful Warriors | December 16, 1992 | 1:05:56 | Toshiba EMI (TOCT-6802) | |
| Sing!! Street Fighter II: Instrumental Version | March 19, 1993 | 50:06 | Pony Canyon (PCCB-00114) | |
| Sing!! Street Fighter II: Original Karaoke Version | March 19, 1993 | 50:06 | Pony Canyon (PCCB-00115) | |
| Street Fighter II: Portrait of the Magician | July 14, 1993 | 1:12:00 | Toshiba EMI (TOCT-8088) | |
| Street Fighter II Collector's Box (VHS) | September 17, 1993 | 2:48:31 | Pony Canyon (PCCB-00124) | |
| Street Fighter II Collector's Box (Laserdisc) | September 17, 1993 | 2:47:54 | Pony Canyon (PCCB-00125) | |
| Super Street Fighter II: The New Challengers Arcade Gametrack | January 21, 1994 | 57:59 | Sony Records (SRCL-2822) | |
| Street Fighter II Alpha-Lyla with Yuji Toriyama | April 1, 1994 | 46:51 | Sony Records (SRCL-2857) | |
| Street Fighter II Movie Original Soundtrack | August 1, 1994 | 1:00:59 | Sony Records (SRCL-2937) | |
| Sound Complete: Super Street Fighter II X | November 7, 1994 | 35:55 | Shinseisha Inc. (63381-01) | |
| Street Fighter II Movie Original Soundtrack Vol. 2: Original Score Album | November 21, 1994 | 46:06 | Sony Records (SRCL-3047) | |
| Street Fighter Original Motion Picture Score | December 16, 1994 | 52:47 | Varèse Sarabande (VSD-5560) | |
| Street Fighter: All New Songs from the Motion Picture (LP edition) | 1994 | 56:56 | Priority Records (P1 53948) | |
| Street Fighter: All New Songs from the Motion Picture (CD edition) | 1994 | 56:56 | Priority Records (P2 53948) | |
| Street Fighter: All New Songs from the Motion Picture (UK CD edition) | 1994 | 56:56 | Priority Records (CDPTY 114) | |
| Street Fighter: All New Songs from the Motion Picture (UK LP edition) | 1994 | 56:56 | Priority Records (PTYLP 114) | |
| Street Fighter: All New Songs from the Motion Picture (promo) | 1994 | 51:22 | Priority Records (DBPRO 50836) | |
| The World Warrior: Street Fighter II | 1994 | 27:03 | Living Beat Records (LBECD 027) | |
| The World Warrior: Street Fighter II (reissue) | 1994 | 27:03 | Living Beat Records (LBET 027) | |
| The World Warrior: Street Fighter II (cassette edition) | 1994 | 27:03 | Living Beat Records (LBEMC 027) | |
| The World Warrior: Street Fighter II (DE edition) | 1994 | 27:03 | Rough Trade Records (RTD 125.1825.3) | |
| Street Fighter II Gaiden: Cammy: Prelude to Battle | February 22, 1995 | 45:42 | Sony Records (SRCL-3131) | |
| Street Fighter Original Motion Picture Soundtrack (JP edition) | March 24, 1995 | 52:47 | SLC Records (SLCS-7250) | |
| The World Warrior: Street Fighter II (JP edition) | March 24, 1995 | 27:03 | Sony Records (SRCL-3195) | |
| Street Fighter: All New Songs from the Motion Picture (reissue) | April 5, 1995 | 43:14 | Pony Canyon (PCCY-00748) | |
| Street Fighter Zero Arcade Gametrack | August 21, 1995 | 59:15 | Sony Records (SRCL-3297) | |
| Street Fighter II V Original Soundtrack | September 27, 1995 | 48:40 | Toshiba EMI (TOCT-9195) | |
| Street Fighter II V: Theme of Ryu & Ken: "Forever Friends" | November 5, 1995 | 15:15 | Ayers (AYDM-101) | |
| Street Fighter II V: Theme of Chun-Li: "Just Believe" | November 5, 1995 | | Ayers (AYDM-102) | |
| Street Fighter Zero Gaiden: Chun-Li Sets Off on a Trip | December 16, 1995 | 1:01:27 | Victor Entertainment (VICL-8181) | |
| Street Fighter Zero 2 | June 21, 1996 | 1:29:20 | Victor Entertainment (VIZL-24) | |
| Street Fighter Zero 2 Another Story: Sakura: Extremely Dangerous Female High-School Student | July 3, 1996 | 54:32 | Victor Entertainment (VICL-8201) | |
| Street Fighter Zero 2 Underground Mixxes: "Da Soundz of Spasm" (Japanese edition) | July 24, 1996 | 41:02 | Victor Entertainment (VICL-2172) | |
| Street Fighter Zero 2 Another Story II: Sakura: The Most Dangerous Culture Festival | October 23, 1996 | 51:44 | Victor Entertainment (VICL-8207) | |
| X-Men vs. Street Fighter | November 21, 1996 | 54:46 | Victor Entertainment (VICL-2176) | |
| Street Fighter EX | February 21, 1997 | 53:35 | Pony Canyon (PCCB-00241) | |
| Street Fighter EX: Arrange Sound Trax | March 5, 1997 | 59:21 | Pony Canyon (PCCB-00251) | |
| Street Fighter EX: Drama CD | March 21, 1997 | 1:13:02 | Pony Canyon (PCCB-00256) | |
| Street Fighter Alpha 2 Underground Mixxes: "Da Soundz of Spasm" (UK edition) | May 24, 1997 | 41:02 | Pioneer LDCE (PLCDG-1009-2) | |
| Street Fighter III: New Generation | June 4, 1997 | 54:17 | Victor Entertainment (VICL-60055) | |
| Street Fighter III: New Generation Original Arrange Album | June 18, 1997 | 49:06 | First Smile (FSCA-10007) | |
| Marvel Super Heroes vs. Street Fighter Original Sound Track & Arrange | September 19, 1997 | 1:03:01 | First Smile (FSCA-10017) | |
| Street Fighter III 2nd Impact Giant Attack Original Sound Track | December 17, 1997 | 1:11:39 | First Smile (FSCA-10025) | |
| Street Fighter EX2 | June 17, 1998 | 1:04:31 | Pony Canyon (PCCB-00322) | |
| Street Fighter EX2: Drama CD | July 1, 1998 | 1:15:29 | Pony Canyon (PCCB-00319) | |
| Street Fighter EX2: Arrange Album | July 23, 1998 | 57:05 | Suleputer (CPCA-1009) | |
| Street Fighter Alpha 2 Underground Mixxes: "Da Soundz of Spasm" (US edition) | August 1, 1998 | 41:02 | Viz Media (CD-SF01) | |
| Street Fighter Zero 3 Original Soundtrack | September 21, 1998 | 2:09:47 | Suleputer (CPCA-1012~3) | |
| Street Fighter Artist Album: Street Fighter II | October 21, 1998 | 57:19 | Suleputer (CPCA-1015) | |
| Street Fighter Zero 3 Drama Album | January 21, 1999 | | Suleputer (CPCA-1019) | |
| Street Fighter III 3rd Strike Original Soundtrack | July 7, 1999 | 1:34:00 | Suleputer (CPCA-1028) | |
| Street Fighter III 3rd Strike Infinite | 1999 | | Suleputer (CPLA-1002) | |
| Street Fighter III 3rd Strike Original Soundtrack Sampler CD | 1999 | 27:33 | Suleputer (CFCP-1003) | |
| Street Fighter EX2 Plus Original Soundtrack | February 19, 2000 | 1:18:46 | Suleputer (CPCA-1038) | |
| Street Fighter EX3 Original Soundtrack | May 24, 2000 | 1:04:29 | Suleputer (CPCA-1042) | |
| Street Fighter Zero: The Animation Original Soundtrack | May 24, 2000 | 42:45 | Polydor Records (POCX-2005) | |
| Street Fighter III: 3rd Strike Original Soundtrack (reissue) | October 4, 2000 | 1:14:23 | Mars Colony Music (MCM-10104-2) | |
| Street Fighter Tribute Album | December 17, 2003 | 1:04:47 | Suleputer (CPCA-1083) | |
| Street Fighter vs Street Musician | March 26, 2004 | 1:11:39 | ES Entertainment (ESCS-0307) | |
| Street Fighter Tribute Album (KR edition) | December 16, 2004 | 1:04:47 | Muzoo Records (MZC1002) | |
| Hyper Street Fighter II: The Starting Over: Remix Tracks | August 6, 2005 | 51:39 | Insanity Naked Hunter (INDV-0104) | |
| Street Fighter Underground Remix | November 25, 2008 | 16:22 | Capcom | |
| Street Fighter IV Collector's Edition Soundtrack | February 7, 2009 | 50:28 | Capcom | |
| Super Street Fighter II Turbo Battle Vinyl (limited edition) | February 20, 2009 | | Capcom (RYU001) | |
| Street Fighter IV Original Soundtrack | February 25, 2009 | 2:27:26 | Suleputer (CPCA-10201~2) | |
| PSM3 Presents: Street Fighter: The Music Collection | February 2009 | 47:49 | PSM3 (UPM110CD) | |
| Street Fighter: The Legend of Chun-Li Original Motion Picture Soundtrack | March 3, 2009 | 54:04 | Lakeshore Records (LKS 340682) | |
| Street Fighter IV Original Soundtrack (reissue) | May 26, 2009 | 2:19:25 | Sumthing Else Music Works (SE-2057-2) | |
| Super Street Fighter IV Character Sound Collection (Single Cut) | April 28, 2010 | 1:05:21 | Capcom | |
| Super Street Fighter IV Arcade Edition Premium Sound Track | June 30, 2011 | 12:09 | Capcom (CAPE-10630) | |
| Street Fighter X Tekken Original Soundtrack | March 8, 2012 | 1:59:50 | Capcom (CPDA-10070~1) | |
| Street Fighter 25th Anniversary Collector's Set (limited edition) | September 18, 2012 | 10:58:25 | Capcom (33070CD1~11) | |
| Street Fighter V Original Soundtrack | February 16, 2016 | 2:31:45 | Sumthing Else Music Works | |
| Street Fighter V Original Soundtrack (reissue) | June 28, 2016 | 2:31:45 | Sumthing Else Music Works (SE-3167-2) | |
| Street Fighter V GENERAL STORY ORIGINAL SOUND TRACK | September 14, 2016 | 2:37:50 | SULEPUTER | |
| Street Fighter V: Arcade Edition Original Soundtrack | February 14, 2018 | 3:35:21 | SULEPUTER | |
| Street Fighter V: Champion Edition Original Soundtrack | September 30, 2020 | 1:55:26 | SULEPUTER | |
| Street Fighter V: Champion Edition Season 5 Original Soundtrack | April 20, 2022 | 1:11:08 | SULEPUTER | |
