= List of Street Fighter video games =

The following is a list of video games that are part of the Street Fighter series.

Release timeline Main series in bold
1987	**Street Fighter**
1988
1989
1990	Street Fighter 2010
1991	**Street Fighter II**
1992	Street Fighter II: Champion Edition
1992	Street Fighter II: Hyper Fighting
1993	Super Street Fighter II
1994	Super Street Fighter II Turbo
1995	**Street Fighter Alpha**
1995	Street Fighter: The Movie (Arcade)
1995	Street Fighter: The Movie (Console)
1996	Street Fighter Alpha 2
1996	X-Men vs. Street Fighter
1996	Street Fighter EX
1997	**Street Fighter III: New Generation**
1997	Marvel Super Heroes vs. Street Fighter
1997	Street Fighter Collection
1997	Street Fighter III: 2nd Impact
1998	Street Fighter EX2
1998	Street Fighter Alpha 3
1999	Street Fighter III: 3rd Strike
2000	Street Fighter EX3
2001	Super Street Fighter II Turbo
2002
2003	Hyper Street Fighter II
2004	Street Fighter Anniversary Collection
2004	Capcom Fighting Evolution
2005
2006	Street Fighter Alpha Anthology
2007
2008	**Street Fighter IV**
2008	Super Street Fighter II Turbo HD Remix
2009
2010	Super Street Fighter IV
2010	Super Street Fighter IV: Arcade Edition
2011	Super Street Fighter IV: 3D Edition
2012	Street Fighter X Tekken
2012	Street Fighter X Mega Man
2013
2014	Ultra Street Fighter IV
2015
2016	**Street Fighter V**
2017	Ultra Street Fighter II
2018	Street Fighter V: Arcade Edition
2018	Street Fighter 30th Anniversary Collection
2019
2020	Street Fighter V: Champion Edition
2021
2022	Capcom Fighting Collection
2023	**Street Fighter 6**
2024	Marvel vs. Capcom Fighting Collection
2025	Capcom Fighting Collection 2

== Main series ==
=== Street Fighter ===
- Street Fighter
  - Fighting Street (Turbo CD)
  - Street Fighter (ZX Spectrum, Amstrad CPC, Commodore 64, Atari ST, Amiga, MS-DOS)
  - Street Fighter (PSP as part of Capcom Classics Collection Remixed, and PlayStation 2 and Xbox as part of Capcom Classics Collection Vol. 2)

=== Street Fighter II series ===
- Street Fighter II: The World Warrior (Arcade)
  - Street Fighter II: The World Warrior (Super Nintendo Entertainment System)
  - Street Fighter II: The World Warrior (ZX Spectrum, Commodore 64, Atari ST, Amiga, MS-DOS)
  - Street Fighter II (Game Boy – this version combined elements from the first 4 versions of SFII (Street Fighter II: The World Warrior to Super Street Fighter II))
  - Street Fighter II: The World Warrior (PlayStation – part of Street Fighter Collection Vol. 2 (US), Capcom Generation Vol. 5: Fighters (Japan))
  - Street Fighter II: The World Warrior (PlayStation 2 – part of Capcom Classics Collection Vol. 1)
  - Street Fighter II: The World Warrior (Sega Saturn – part of Capcom Generation Vol. 5: Fighters, Japanese release)
  - Street Fighter II: The World Warrior (Wii – downloadable by VC. Emulated SNES version)
- Street Fighter II: Champion Edition
  - Street Fighter II – Champion Edition (TurboGrafx-16 – Japanese release)
  - Street Fighter II – Champion Edition (Super Famicom/Super NES – part of Street Fighter II Turbo: Hyper Fighting)
  - Street Fighter II – Champion Edition (Mega Drive/Sega Genesis – part of Street Fighter II – Special Champion Edition)
  - Street Fighter II – Champion Edition (PlayStation – part of Street Fighter Collection Vol. 2 (US), Capcom Generation Vol. 5: Fighters (Japan))
  - Street Fighter II – Champion Edition (PlayStation 2 – part of Capcom Classics Collection Vol. 1)
  - Street Fighter II (Master System – Brazil-only release)
  - Street Fighter II': Champion Edition (Saturn – part of Capcom Generation Vol. 5: Fighters, Japanese release)
- Street Fighter II: Hyper Fighting
  - Street Fighter II Turbo (Super Famicom/Super NES)
  - Street Fighter II – Special Champion Edition, Street Fighter II Plus (Mega Drive/Sega Genesis)
  - Street Fighter II Turbo, Street Fighter II – Hyper Fighting (PlayStation – part of Street Fighter Collection Vol. 2 (US), Capcom Generation Vol. 5: Fighters (Japan))
  - Street Fighter II Turbo, Street Fighter II – Hyper Fighting (PlayStation 2 – part of Capcom Classics Collection Vol. 1)
  - Street Fighter II: Hyper Fighting (Sega Saturn – part of Capcom Generation Vol. 5: Fighters, Japanese release)
  - Street Fighter II: Hyper Fighting (Xbox 360 – downloadable through Xbox Live Arcade, Released August 2, 2006)
- Super Street Fighter II: The New Challengers
  - Super Street Fighter II: The New Challengers (Super Famicom/Super NES)
  - Super Street Fighter II: The New Challengers (Mega Drive/Sega Genesis)
  - Super Street Fighter II: The New Challengers (PlayStation – part of Street Fighter Collection (US, Japan))
  - Super Street Fighter II: The New Challengers (Saturn – part of Street Fighter Collection (US, Japan))
  - Super Street Fighter II: The New Challengers (Atari ST, Amiga, MS-DOS)
  - Super Street Fighter II: The New Challengers (MS-DOS, US release)

A special version of this game, titled Super Street Fighter II: Tournament Battle, was created to allow eight players to participate in an elimination tournament.

- Super Street Fighter II Turbo, Super Street Fighter II X: Grand Master Challenge
  - Super Street Fighter II Turbo, Super Street Fighter II X: Grand Master Challenge (3DO Interactive Multiplayer)
  - Super Street Fighter II Turbo (MS-DOS, Amiga, CD32)
  - Super Street Fighter II Turbo, Super Street Fighter II X: Grand Master Challenge (PlayStation – part of Street Fighter Collection (US, Japan))
  - Super Street Fighter II Turbo, Super Street Fighter II X: Grand Master Challenge (Sega Saturn – part of Street Fighter Collection (US, Japan))
  - Super Street Fighter II Turbo, Super Street Fighter II X: Grand Master Challenge (PlayStation 2 – part of Capcom Classics Collection Vol. 2)
  - Super Street Fighter II Turbo, Super Street Fighter II X: Grand Master Challenge (Xbox – part of Capcom Classics Collection Vol. 2)
  - Super Street Fighter II X: Grand Master Challenge for Matching Service (Dreamcast – Japan only) – First fighting game with online play (with the exception of console versions of Super Street Fighter II: The New Challengers playable through XBAND)
  - Super Street Fighter II Turbo Revival, Super Street Fighter II X: Revival (Game Boy Advance)
  - Super Street Fighter II Turbo HD Remix (Xbox 360 – downloadable through Xbox Live Arcade, PlayStation 3 – downloadable through PlayStation Network.)
- Hyper Street Fighter II: The Anniversary Edition
  - Hyper Street Fighter II: The Anniversary Edition (PlayStation 2 – part of Street Fighter Anniversary Collection)
  - Hyper Street Fighter II: The Anniversary Edition (Xbox – part of Street Fighter Anniversary Collection)
- Ultra Street Fighter II: The Final Challengers

Although not fighting games and not video games, the Street Fighter II series also contained:

- Street Fighter II Pinball: A pinball arcade game developed by Gottlieb in 1993.

And:

- A card game titled Street Fighter II: World Warriors Card Game
- An LCD game titled Street Fighter II
- A board game titled Street Fighter II
- A competitive spinning-top game similar to that of Beyblade titled Spin Fighters.
- A slot machine titled "Street Fighter II"

=== Street Fighter Alpha series ===
- Street Fighter Alpha: Warriors' Dreams, Street Fighter Zero
  - Street Fighter Alpha: Warriors' Dreams, Street Fighter Zero (Game Boy Color)
  - Street Fighter Alpha: Warriors' Dreams (MS-DOS, US release)
  - Street Fighter Alpha: Warriors' Dreams, Street Fighter Zero (PlayStation)
  - Street Fighter Alpha: Warriors' Dreams, Street Fighter Zero (Sega Saturn)
- Street Fighter Alpha 2, Street Fighter Zero 2
  - Street Fighter Alpha 2, Street Fighter Zero 2 (Super Famicom/Super NES)
  - Street Fighter Alpha 2, Street Fighter Zero 2 (PlayStation)
  - Street Fighter Alpha 2, Street Fighter Zero 2 (Sega Saturn)
  - Street Fighter Alpha 2 (MS-DOS, US release)
  - Street Fighter Zero 2' (PlayStation)
  - Street Fighter Alpha 2 (Wii, downloadable by VC. Emulated SNES version. )
  - Street Fighter Alpha 2 Gold, Street Fighter Zero 2' (Sega Saturn – part of Street Fighter Collection)
  - Street Fighter Alpha 2 Gold, Street Fighter Zero 2' (PlayStation – part of Street Fighter Collection)

Rereleased into arcades as Street Fighter Zero 2 Alpha (Japan only):

- Street Fighter Alpha 3, Street Fighter Zero 3
  - Street Fighter Alpha 3, Street Fighter Zero 3 (PlayStation)
  - Street Fighter Alpha 3, Street Fighter Zero 3 – Saikyou-ryuu Dojo (Dreamcast) – online play

Rereleased into arcades as Street Fighter Zero 3 Upper (Japan only).

  - Street Fighter Zero 3 (Sega Saturn – Japan only)
  - Street Fighter Alpha 3 Upper, Street Fighter Zero 3 Upper (Game Boy Advance)
  - Street Fighter Alpha 3 Max, Street Fighter Zero 3 Double Upper (PSP)

Included in Street Fighter Alpha Anthology, Street Fighter Zero Fighters Generation (PlayStation 2):

  - Street Fighter Alpha: Warriors' Dreams
  - Street Fighter Alpha 2, Street Fighter Zero 2 Arrange
  - Street Fighter Alpha 2 Gold, Street Fighter Zero 2 Alpha Arrange
  - Street Fighter Alpha 3, Street Fighter Zero 3
  - Street Fighter Alpha 3 Upper (Game Boy Advance Version)
  - Hyper Street Fighter Alpha, Hyper Street Fighter Zero

Note: the arrange versions of Zero 2 and Zero 2 Alpha are the versions used in the US release, so Alpha Anthology only has two extra games (SFA3 Upper and Hyper SFA).

=== Street Fighter III series ===
- Street Fighter III: New Generation
  - Street Fighter III: New Generation (Sega Dreamcast – part of Street Fighter III: Double Impact)
- Street Fighter III: 2nd Impact – Giant Attack
  - Street Fighter III: 2nd Impact – Giant Attack (Sega Dreamcast – part of Street Fighter III: Double Impact)
- Street Fighter III: 3rd Strike – Fight for the Future
  - Street Fighter III: 3rd Strike – Fight for the Future (Sega Dreamcast)
  - Street Fighter III: 3rd Strike – Fight for the Future (PlayStation 2 – stand-alone release in Japan, part of Street Fighter Anniversary Collection in North America)
  - Street Fighter III: 3rd Strike – Fight for the Future (Xbox – part of Street Fighter Anniversary Collection)
  - Street Fighter III: 3rd Strike – Fight for the Future – Online Edition (PlayStation 3, Xbox 360)

=== Street Fighter IV series ===
- Street Fighter IV (Xbox 360, PlayStation 3 and PC)
  - Street Fighter IV HD (iOS)
  - Street Fighter IV Volt (iOS)
  - Street Fighter IV Champion Edition (iOS)
  - Street Fighter IV Arena (Korea only) (Android)
- Super Street Fighter IV (Xbox 360 and PlayStation 3)
  - Super Street Fighter IV: 3D Edition (Nintendo 3DS)
- Super Street Fighter IV: Arcade Edition (Xbox 360, PlayStation 3 and PC)
- Ultra Street Fighter IV (Xbox 360, PlayStation 3, PC, PlayStation 4)

=== Street Fighter V ===
- Street Fighter V (PlayStation 4 and PC)
- Street Fighter V: Arcade Edition (PlayStation 4 and PC)
- Street Fighter V: Champion Edition (PlayStation 4 and PC)

=== Street Fighter 6 ===
- Street Fighter 6 (PlayStation 4, PlayStation 5, Xbox Series X|S and PC)
- Street Fighter 6 Years 1-2 Fighters Edition (PlayStation 4, PlayStation 5, Xbox Series X|S, Nintendo Switch 2 and PC)

=== Compilations ===
- Street Fighter Collection (Sega Saturn, PlayStation)
- Street Fighter Collection 2, Capcom Generation Collection 5: The Fighters (Sega Saturn, PlayStation)
- Street Fighter Anniversary Collection (PlayStation 2, Xbox)
- Street Fighter Alpha Anthology (PlayStation 2)
- Street Fighter 4 Collector's Edition (PlayStation 3, Xbox 360)
- Street Fighter 25th Anniversary – Collector's Set (PlayStation 3, Xbox 360)
- Street Fighter 30th Anniversary Collection (PlayStation 4, Xbox One, Nintendo Switch, Microsoft Windows)

== Other games ==
These games are not part of the mainline Street Fighter series, but involve Street Fighter characters.

=== Final Fight series ===
The Final Fight series, which first release was for Arcades in 1989 and was originally intended as direct sequel to the original Street Fighter, has many connections to the Street Fighter series including multiple characters from the series making playable appearances in the Final Fight series.

- Final Fight
- Final Fight 2
- Final Fight 3
- Mighty Final Fight
- Final Fight Revenge
- Final Fight: Streetwise

=== Street Fighter 2010: The Final Fight ===
A NES game released in 1990, featuring Ken Masters as a scientist. Ken must avenge the death of his co-worker Troy by donning body armor and fighting mutants and aliens in this platform game. This game is actually not part of the series; the Japanese version (titled 2010: Street Fighter) had nothing to do with Street Fighter (in the Japanese version, the protagonist was a policeman named Kevin Straker).

=== Street Fighter EX series ===
- Street Fighter EX (Arcade, 1996)
  - Street Fighter EX Plus (Arcade, 1997)
  - Street Fighter EX Plus Alpha (PlayStation, 1997)
- Street Fighter EX2 (Arcade, 1998)
  - Street Fighter EX2 Plus (Arcade, 1999/PlayStation, 2000)
- Street Fighter EX3 (PlayStation 2, 2000)

=== Marvel vs. Capcom series ===
These fighting games involve characters from Marvel Comics, and various Capcom games.

- X-Men: Children of the Atom (Arcade, PlayStation, Sega Saturn, DOS) – Although not technically part of the Marvel vs. Capcom series, this game has Akuma as a secret character.
- X-Men vs. Street Fighter (Arcade, PlayStation, Sega Saturn)
- Marvel Super Heroes vs. Street Fighter (Arcade, PlayStation, Sega Saturn)
- Marvel vs. Capcom: Clash of Super Heroes (Arcade, Dreamcast, PlayStation)
- Marvel vs. Capcom 2: New Age of Heroes (Arcade, Dreamcast, PlayStation 2, Xbox, PlayStation Network, Xbox Live Arcade)
- Marvel vs. Capcom 3: Fate of Two Worlds (PlayStation 3, Xbox 360)
- Ultimate Marvel vs. Capcom 3 (PlayStation 3, Xbox 360)
- Marvel vs. Capcom: Infinite (PlayStation 4, Xbox One, PC)

=== SNK vs. Capcom series ===
These games also involve characters from SNK Playmore's various fighting games. For more information, see SNK vs. series.

- Capcom vs. SNK: Millennium Fight 2000 (Arcade, Dreamcast)
- Capcom vs. SNK Pro (Arcade, Dreamcast, PlayStation)
- Capcom vs. SNK 2: Mark of the Millennium 2001 (Arcade, Dreamcast, PlayStation 2, Xbox)
- Capcom vs. SNK 2 EO (GameCube, Xbox)
- SNK vs. Capcom: Match of the Millennium (Neo Geo Pocket Color)
- SNK vs. Capcom: SVC Chaos (Neo Geo – Arcade & Home versions, PlayStation 2 – Japan Only, Xbox)

Although the next games are a mix of RPG and TCG they feature most if not all of the characters in card form:

- SNK vs. Capcom Card Fighters Clash: Capcom version (Neo Geo Pocket Color)
- SNK vs. Capcom Card Fighters Clash: SNK version (Neo Geo Pocket Color)
- SNK vs. Capcom Card Fighters 2: Expand Edition (Neo Geo Pocket Color – Japan Only)
- SNK vs. Capcom Card Fighters DS (Nintendo DS)

=== Tatsunoko vs. Capcom series ===
- Tatsunoko vs. Capcom: Cross Generation of Heroes (Arcade, Wii – Japan only) – (as in a fictional crossover), this game was developed by Capcom. It features Tatsunoko Company's anime fighters versus Capcom's fighters.
- Tatsunoko vs. Capcom: Ultimate All-Stars (Wii) – With a few additional characters and one left out, this is the first version to be released outside Japan.

=== Street Fighter × Tekken series ===
- Street Fighter X Tekken – A crossover title with Namco's fighting series. It was announced by Yoshinori Ono at Comic Con 2010. It uses the Street Fighter IV engine and features tag team matches.
- Tekken X Street Fighter – Namco was developing it with their own Tekken 6 engine, as a 3D fighter. (unreleased)

=== Miscellaneous games ===
- Street Fighter X All Capcom – An RPG-card game released in Japan on mobile devices. As the name implies, it is a crossover of Street Fighter and many other Capcom series.
- Cannon Spike – While not a Street Fighter game, this shooting game featured Street Fighters Charlie and Cammy as playable characters.
- Capcom Fighting Evolution (PlayStation 2, Xbox)
- Cyberbots – Fullmetal Madness—This was a fighting game featuring giant mechs, most of them also featured on, or based on the designs from, the arcade game Armored Warriors. The game also featured Jin Saotome, who would later reappear in Marvel vs. Capcom. The Sega Saturn and PlayStation versions feature a robotic version of Akuma as a secret character.
- Rival Schools: United by Fate (Shiritsu Justice Gakuen: Legion Of Heroes in Japan) – 3D fighting game featuring Sakura.
- Project Justice – Rival Schools' sequel
- Street Fighter: The Movie (Arcade) – A fighting game that was based on the movie, with digitized characters akin to Mortal Kombat.
- Street Fighter: The Movie (PlayStation, Sega Saturn) – Also titled Street Fighter: Real Battle on Film in Japan, to avoid confusion with the similarly titled Street Fighter II: Movie game. – A fighting game that was based on the movie, with digitized characters akin to Mortal Kombat. The home version is distinctly different from the arcade version, with a slightly different roster and a gameplay that is closer to that of Super Street Fighter II Turbo.
- Street Fighter II Movie (PlayStation, Sega Saturn) – Also termed the informal title of Street Fighter II: The Interactive Movie, which is incorrect as "Interactive Movie" is the genre and is not part of the game's title—An adventure game based on the animated Street Fighter II: The Animated Movie, released on December 12, 1995 for the PlayStation and on March 15, 1996 for the Saturn both in Japan only. The player takes control of one of Shadaloo's monitor cyborgs as they travel the globe in search of Ryu, while learning new moves and analyzing other fighters. The game consists of footage from the film (along with new footage made specifically for the game) and fighting segments based on the Super Street Fighter II engine.
- Street Fighter 25th Anniversary Collection (PlayStation 3) – A limited edition collector's released exclusively in North America on September 18, 2012. Includes Street Fighter X Tekken, Super Street Fighter IV Arcade Edition, Super Street Fighter II Turbo HD Remix and Street Fighter III: Third Strike Online Edition, various downloadable content, two Blu-ray Discs containing Street Fighter IV: The Ties That Bind, Street Fighter II: The Animated Movie and the entire US animated television series, and various bonus items.
- Super Puzzle Fighter II Turbo (Arcade, PlayStation, Sega Saturn, Dreamcast, GBA, Windows, PSP, XBLA, PSN) – Also titled Super Puzzle Fighter II X in Japan, this was a puzzle game featuring super deformed versions of various Street Fighter and Darkstalkers characters. Players would destroy colored gems, and depending on the size and number of the gems crushed, their chosen fighter would attack the opponent.
- Super Gem Fighter Mini-Mix (Arcade, PlayStation, Sega Saturn, WonderSwan, PS2) – Also titled Pocket Fighter in Japan and in home console versions; a fighting game with the same super deformed characters in Puzzle Fighter. The fighting engine was much simpler and the game had more of a focus on humor, as fighters pulled out various objects (such as street signs, ink brushes, planks, umbrellas, and 100-ton mallets) and switched into many costumes (showgirl outfits, masked wrestlers, and even other Capcom characters) to beat each other up. The game is only included in Street Fighter Alpha Anthology, Street Fighter Zero: Fighter's Generation on PS2.
- Namco × Capcom (PlayStation 2) – Pronounced "Namco cross Capcom" (as in a fictional crossover), this game was developed by Monolith Soft as a joint venture between Namco and Capcom, featuring multiple games and series from both firms. It is considered a tactical turnbased fighter, where characters are in a grid and take turns doing battle in a real time simplified battle system. The character being attacked can only wait to get beaten up, but can reduce damage by pushing certain directions on the controller. The character attacking can only choose from up to 5 special attacks, combos, or a combination of both to attack with.
- Street Fighter: Puzzle Spirits (Android, iOS) – Similar in concept to Super Puzzle Fighter II Turbo, but with characters from only the Street Fighter universe, containing super deformed characters fighting in accord with the player's performance in solving a puzzle. 12 characters are available: Ryu, Chun-Li, Ken, Sakura, Ibuki, Guile, Cammy, Vega, Juri, Sagat, M. Bison and Akuma.
- Street Fighter Online: Mouse Generation – a fighting game made for PC that uses a mouse as a controller. It features 20 characters, 5 of which are from Street Fighter: Ryu, Ken, Chun-Li, Guile, Zangief. Among 15 other characters are Batsu Ichimonji and Akira Kazama from Rival Schools series.
- Street Fighter X Mega Man – A platform game developed by a fan of both franchises, Seo Hui Zong, and with the support of the owner Capcom. It has the same gameplay seen in the first games of the Mega Man series, but the enemies faced in the game are the fighters of various games in the series Street Fighter.
- Super Smash Bros. for Nintendo 3DS and Wii U – A pair of games from the platform fighting game franchise Super Smash Bros. published by Nintendo for the Nintendo 3DS and Wii U. The games from the Super Smash Bros. franchise are crossover titles that feature characters, items, music, and stages from various Nintendo franchises, as well as from several third-party video game franchises. In addition to the main roster, several additional characters were released as downloadable content for the 3DS and Wii U games, among them being Ryu from Street Fighter. An amiibo figurine of Ryu was also released in conjunction with the games.
- Super Smash Bros. Ultimate – The 2018 game from the platform fighting game franchise Super Smash Bros. for the Nintendo Switch. It was announced that every character to ever appear as a fighter in any previous game from the Super Smash Bros. franchise, including Ryu from Street Fighter, would return as part of the main roster in Ultimate. All previously released amiibo figurines compatible with the prior Super Smash Bros. games, including the Ryu figurine, will retain compatibility with Ultimate. Ken from Street Fighter was also included in Ultimate as a new echo fighter and received a new amiibo figurine at retail.
- Power Rangers: Legacy Wars – A fighting game made for iOS and Android by nWay Games based on the Power Rangers franchise. It features 6 characters from Street Fighter as guest fighters: Ryu, Akuma, Chun-Li, Guile, Cammy and M. Bison. Original fighters known as Ryu Ranger and Chun-Li Ranger (Street Fighter's Ryu and Chun-Li morphed into Power Rangers) were also introduced into the game at a later time.
- Street Fighter VR Shadaloo Enhancement Plan – A virtual reality game released in the Japanese arcades in February 2023.
- Street Fighter: Duel – An iOS and Android game by Tencent started its launch as a China exclusive app in 2022 before the game's worldwide release in 2023.
