= List of Capcom games: S =

This is a list of video games by Capcom organized alphabetically by name. The list may also include ports that were developed and published by others companies under license from Capcom.

Title	System	Release date	Developer(s)	JP	NA	EU	AUS	Ref(s)
Samurai Sword	Family Computer Disk System	November 15, 1988	Capcom	Yes				
Saturday Night Slam Masters	Arcade	July 13, 1993	Capcom	Yes	Yes	Yes	Yes	
Saturday Night Slam Masters	Sega Mega Drive/Genesis	July 13, 1993	Capcom	Yes	Yes	Yes	Yes	
Saturday Night Slam Masters	Super Nintendo Entertainment System	July 13, 1993	Capcom	Yes	Yes	Yes	Yes	
Section Z	Arcade	December 1985	Capcom		Yes			
Section Z	Family Computer Disk System	May 25, 1987	Capcom	Yes				
Section Z	Nintendo Entertainment System	July 1987	Capcom		Yes	Yes		
Sengoku Basara	PlayStation 2	July 21, 2005	Capcom	Yes	Yes	Yes	Yes	
Sengoku Basara	PlayStation Network	June 19, 2013	Capcom	Yes				
Sengoku Basara 2	PlayStation 2	2006	Capcom	Yes				
Sengoku Basara 2	Wii	2006	Capcom	Yes				
Sengoku Basara Battle Heroes	PlayStation Portable	2009	Capcom	Yes				
Sengoku Basara Chronicle Heroes	PlayStation Portable	July 21, 2011	Capcom	Yes				
Sengoku Basara X	Arcade	2008	Capcom	Yes				
Sengoku Basara X	PlayStation 2	2008	Capcom	Yes				
Sengoku Basara: Samurai Heroes	PlayStation 3	July 29, 2010	Capcom	Yes	Yes	Yes	Yes	
Sengoku Basara: Samurai Heroes	Wii	July 29, 2010	Capcom	Yes	Yes	Yes	Yes	
Sengoku Basara 4	PlayStation 3	January 23, 2014	Capcom	Yes				
Sengoku Basara 4	PlayStation 4	July 23, 2015	Capcom	Yes				
Sengoku Basara: Sanada Yukimura-Den	PlayStation 3	August 25, 2016	Capcom	Yes				
Sengoku Basara: Sanada Yukimura-Den	PlayStation 4	August 25, 2016	Capcom	Yes				
Shadow of Rome	PlayStation 2	February 4, 2005	Capcom	Yes	Yes	Yes		
Shantae	Game Boy Color	June 2, 2002	WayForward Technologies		Yes			
Shichisei Toushin: Guyferd	PlayStation	1998	Capcom	Yes				
Shichisei Toushin: Guyferd	Sega Saturn	1998	Capcom	Yes				
Shiritsu Justice Gakuen: Nekketsu Seisyun Nikki 2	PlayStation	1999	Capcom	Yes				
Side Arms	Commodore 64			Yes				
Side Arms	TurboGrafx-16			Yes				
Side Arms	ZX Spectrum			Yes				
Side Arms Hyper Dyne	Amiga			Yes				
Side Arms Hyper Dyne	Arcade	December 1986	Capcom	Yes				
Side Arms Hyper Dyne	Atari ST			Yes				
Side Arms Special	TurboGrafx-CD			Yes				
Slipstream	Arcade	1995	Capcom	Yes	Yes	Yes		
Smurfs' Village	iOS	2010	Beeline Interactive Inc.		Yes	Yes	Yes	
Smurfs' Village	Android	2011	Beeline Interactive Inc.		Yes	Yes	Yes	
Smurfs' Grabber	iOS	September 7, 2011	Beeline Interactive Inc.		Yes	Yes	Yes	
Smurf Life	iOS	2012	Beeline Interactive Inc.		Yes	Yes	Yes	
Snow Brothers	Nintendo Entertainment System	1990	Capcom		Yes			
SonSon	Arcade	July 1984	Capcom	Yes				
SonSon	Nintendo Entertainment System	February 8, 1986	Micronics	Yes				
SonSon 2	TurboGrafx-16	1989	Capcom	Yes				
Spawn: In the Demon's Hand	Arcade	1999	Capcom	Yes	Yes			
Spawn: In the Demon's Hand	Dreamcast	August 10, 2000	Capcom	Yes	Yes	Yes		
Spyborgs	Wii	September 22, 2009	Bionic Games		Yes	Yes	Yes	
Star Gladiator	Arcade	July 1996	Capcom	Yes	Yes	Yes	Yes	
Star Gladiator	PlayStation	October 25, 1996	Capcom	Yes	Yes	Yes	Yes	
Startling Adventures Kuso 3 נDaiboken	PlayStation	May 24, 2001	Capcom	Yes				
Steel Battalion	Xbox	September 12, 2002	Capcom	Yes	Yes	Yes	Yes	
Steel Battalion: Heavy Armor	Xbox 360	June 19, 2012	FromSoftware	Yes	Yes	Yes	Yes	
Steel Battalion: Line of Contact	Xbox	February 26, 2004	Capcom/Nude Maker	Yes	Yes	Yes		
Steel Fang	Microsoft Windows	1996	Capcom	Yes				
Stocker	Commodore 64	1988	Bally Sente Inc.	Yes	Yes	Yes	Yes	
Street Fighter	Amiga	August 30, 1987	Tiertex			Yes		
Street Fighter	Arcade	August 30, 1987	Capcom	Yes	Yes	Yes		
Street Fighter	Atari ST	1988	Tiertex		Yes	Yes		
Street Fighter	Commodore 64	June 1988	Pacific International Dataworks		Yes	Yes		
Street Fighter	DOS	1988	Micro Talent		Yes			
Street Fighter	ZX Spectrum	1988	Tiertex			Yes		
Street Fighter 30th Anniversary Collection	Microsoft Windows	May 29, 2018	Digital Eclipse	Yes	Yes	Yes	Yes	
Street Fighter 30th Anniversary Collection	Nintendo Switch	May 29, 2018	Digital Eclipse	Yes	Yes	Yes	Yes	
Street Fighter 30th Anniversary Collection	PlayStation 4	May 29, 2018	Digital Eclipse	Yes	Yes	Yes	Yes	
Street Fighter 30th Anniversary Collection	Xbox One	May 29, 2018	Digital Eclipse	Yes	Yes	Yes	Yes	
Street Fighter 2010: The Final Fight	Nintendo Entertainment System	August 8, 1990	Capcom	Yes	Yes			
Street Fighter 2010: The Final Fight	Virtual Console	February 26, 2014	Capcom	Yes	Yes	Yes	Yes	
Street Fighter Alpha	Arcade	June 5, 1995	Capcom	Yes	Yes			
Street Fighter Alpha	Game Boy Color	1999	Capcom	Yes	Yes	Yes		
Street Fighter Alpha	PlayStation	December 22, 1995	Capcom	Yes	Yes	Yes		
Street Fighter Alpha	PlayStation Network	August 14, 2008	Capcom	Yes	Yes	Yes	Yes	
Street Fighter Alpha	Sega Saturn	January 26, 1996	Capcom	Yes	Yes	Yes	Yes	
Street Fighter Alpha	Microsoft Windows	June 14, 1998	Capcom		Yes			
Street Fighter Alpha 2	Arcade	February 27, 1996	Capcom	Yes	Yes			
Street Fighter Alpha 2	PlayStation	August 9, 1996	Capcom	Yes	Yes	Yes		
Street Fighter Alpha 2	PlayStation Network	June 4, 2009	Capcom		Yes			
Street Fighter Alpha 2	Sega Saturn	September 14, 1996	Capcom	Yes	Yes	Yes		
Street Fighter Alpha 2	Super Nintendo Entertainment System	November 1996	Capcom	Yes	Yes	Yes		
Street Fighter Alpha 2	Virtual Console	December 7, 2009	Capcom		Yes	Yes	Yes	
Street Fighter Alpha 2	Microsoft Windows	November 1, 1997	Capcom	Yes	Yes	Yes		
Street Fighter Alpha 3	Arcade	June 29, 1998	Atlus/Capcom	Yes	Yes			
Street Fighter Alpha 3	Dreamcast	July 8, 1999	Atlus/Capcom	Yes	Yes	Yes		
Street Fighter Alpha 3	Game Boy Advance	September 27, 2002	Crawfish Interactive	Yes	Yes	Yes		
Street Fighter Alpha 3	PlayStation	December 23, 1998	Capcom	Yes	Yes	Yes		
Street Fighter Alpha 3	PlayStation Network	October 18, 2011	Capcom	Yes	Yes			
Street Fighter Alpha 3	Sega Saturn	August 6, 1999	Capcom	Yes				
Street Fighter Alpha 3 Max	PlayStation Portable	January 19, 2006	Capcom	Yes	Yes	Yes		
Street Fighter Alpha Anthology	PlayStation 2	May 25, 2006	Capcom	Yes	Yes	Yes	Yes	
Street Fighter Anniversary Collection	PlayStation 2	August 31, 2004	Capcom	Yes				
Street Fighter Anniversary Collection	Xbox	October 28, 2004	Capcom	Yes	Yes	Yes		
Street Fighter Collection	PlayStation	September 18, 1997	Capcom	Yes	Yes	Yes		
Street Fighter Collection	Sega Saturn	October 23, 1997	Capcom	Yes	Yes	Yes		
Street Fighter EX	Arcade	December 19, 1996	Arika	Yes	Yes			
Street Fighter EX2	Arcade	May 26, 1998	Arika	Yes	Yes			
Street Fighter EX 2 Plus	Arcade	June 11, 1999	Arika	Yes	Yes			
Street Fighter EX 2 Plus	PlayStation	December 22, 1999	Arika	Yes	Yes	Yes		
Street Fighter EX3	PlayStation 2	March 4, 2000	Arika	Yes	Yes	Yes		
Street Fighter EX Alpha	PlayStation	July 17, 1997	Arika	Yes	Yes	Yes		
Street Fighter EX Plus	Arcade	March 3, 1997	Arika	Yes	Yes			
Street Fighter II: The World Warrior	Amiga	1992	Creative Materials			Yes		
Street Fighter II: The World Warrior	Arcade	March 1991	Capcom	Yes	Yes	Yes	Yes	
Street Fighter II: The World Warrior	Commodore 64	1992	Creative Materials			Yes		
Street Fighter II: The World Warrior	CPS Changer	1994	Capcom	Yes				
Street Fighter II: The World Warrior	DOS	1992	Capcom		Yes	Yes		
Street Fighter II: The World Warrior	Game Boy	August 11, 1995	Sun L	Yes	Yes	Yes	Yes	
Street Fighter II: The World Warrior	Super Nintendo Entertainment System	June 10, 1992	Capcom	Yes	Yes	Yes		
Street Fighter II: The World Warrior	Virtual Console	December 2, 2006	Capcom	Yes	Yes	Yes	Yes	
Street Fighter II: The World Warrior	ZX Spectrum	1992	Tiertex			Yes		
Street Fighter II Champion Edition	Arcade	March 13, 1992	Capcom	Yes	Yes	Yes	Yes	
Street Fighter II Champion Edition	PC Engine	June 12, 1993	Capcom	Yes				
Street Fighter II Champion Edition	Master System	September 1997	Tec Toy				Yes	
Street Fighter II Champion Edition	Sega Mega Drive/Genesis	September 28, 1993	Capcom	Yes	Yes	Yes		
Street Fighter II Champion Edition	X68000	November 26, 1993	Capcom	Yes				
Street Fighter II Champion Edition	Virtual Console	July 29, 2008	Capcom	Yes	Yes	Yes	Yes	
Street Fighter II Movie	PlayStation	December 12, 1995	Capcom	Yes				
Street Fighter II Movie	Sega Saturn	March 15, 1996	Capcom	Yes				
Street Fighter II: Special Champion Edition	Sega Mega Drive/Genesis	September 28, 1993	Capcom	Yes	Yes	Yes		
Street Fighter II: Hyper Fighting	Arcade	December 9, 1992	Capcom	Yes	Yes	Yes	Yes	
Street Fighter II: Hyper Fighting	CPS Changer	December 9, 1992	Capcom	Yes	Yes	Yes	Yes	
Street Fighter II: Hyper Fighting	Super Nintendo Entertainment System	July 11, 1993	Capcom	Yes	Yes	Yes	Yes	
Street Fighter II: Hyper Fighting	Virtual Console	August 10, 2007	Capcom	Yes	Yes	Yes	Yes	
Street Fighter II: Hyper Fighting	Xbox Live Marketplace	August 2, 2006	Capcom		Yes	Yes		
Street Fighter III: 3rd Strike	Arcade	May 12, 1999	Capcom	Yes	Yes	Yes	Yes	
Street Fighter III: 3rd Strike	Dreamcast	June 29, 2000	Capcom	Yes	Yes	Yes		
Street Fighter III: 3rd Strike	PlayStation 2	July 22, 2004	Capcom	Yes	Yes			
Street Fighter III: 3rd Strike	Xbox	October 28, 2004	Capcom	Yes	Yes	Yes		
Street Fighter III: 3rd Strike Online Edition	PlayStation Network	August 23, 2011	Iron Galaxy Studios	Yes	Yes	Yes		
Street Fighter III: 3rd Strike Online Edition	Xbox Live Marketplace	August 24, 2011	Iron Galaxy Studios	Yes	Yes	Yes	Yes	
Street Fighter III: Double Impact	Dreamcast	December 16, 1999	Capcom	Yes	Yes	Yes		
Street Fighter III: New Generation	Arcade	February 1997	Capcom	Yes	Yes	Yes		
Street Fighter III: 2nd Impact	Arcade	October 1997	Capcom	Yes	Yes			
Street Fighter III: 2nd Impact	Dreamcast	December 16, 1999	Capcom	Yes	Yes	Yes		
Street Fighter IV	Arcade	July 18, 2008	Dimps/Capcom	Yes				
Street Fighter IV	PlayStation 3	February 12, 2009	Dimps/Capcom	Yes	Yes	Yes		
Street Fighter IV	Xbox 360	February 12, 2009	Dimps/Capcom	Yes	Yes	Yes		
Street Fighter IV	Microsoft Windows	July 2, 2009	Dimps/Capcom	Yes	Yes	Yes		
Street Fighter IV	iOS	March 10, 2010	Dimps/Capcom	Yes	Yes	Yes		
Street Fighter IV	Android	March 10, 2010	Dimps/Capcom	Yes	Yes	Yes		
Street Fighter IV: Volt	iOS	June 30, 2011	Dimps/Capcom	Yes	Yes	Yes		
Street Fighter V	PlayStation 4	February 16, 2016	Dimps/Capcom	Yes	Yes	Yes	Yes	
Street Fighter V	Microsoft Windows	February 16, 2016	Dimps/Capcom	Yes	Yes	Yes	Yes	
Street Fighter V: Arcade Version	PlayStation 4	January 16, 2018	Dimps/Capcom	Yes	Yes	Yes	Yes	
Street Fighter V: Arcade Version	Microsoft Windows	January 16, 2018	Dimps/Capcom	Yes	Yes	Yes	Yes	
Street Fighter 6	Microsoft Windows	June 2, 2023	Capcom	Yes	Yes	Yes	Yes	
Street Fighter 6	PlayStation 4	June 2, 2023	Capcom	Yes	Yes	Yes	Yes	
Street Fighter 6	PlayStation 5	June 2, 2023	Capcom	Yes	Yes	Yes	Yes	
Street Fighter 6	Xbox Series X/S	June 2, 2023	Capcom	Yes	Yes	Yes	Yes	
Street Fighter X Mega Man	Microsoft Windows	December 17, 2012	Seow Zong Hui	Yes	Yes	Yes	Yes	
Street Fighter X Tekken	PlayStation 3	March 6, 2012	Dimps/Capcom	Yes	Yes	Yes		
Street Fighter X Tekken	Xbox 360	March 6, 2012	Dimps/Capcom	Yes	Yes	Yes		
Street Fighter X Tekken	Microsoft Windows	May 11, 2012	QLOC	Yes	Yes	Yes	Yes	
Street Fighter X Tekken	PlayStation Vita	October 25, 2012	Sucker Punch Productions	Yes	Yes	Yes		
Street Fighter X Tekken	iOS	September 19, 2012	Dimps/Capcom	Yes	Yes	Yes	Yes	
Street Fighter Zero	CPS Changer	1996	Capcom	Yes				
Street Fighter Zero 2 Alpha	Arcade	1996	Capcom	Yes				
Street Fighter Zero 2 Dash	PlayStation	1996	Capcom	Yes				
Street Fighter Zero 2 Dash	Sega Saturn	1996	Capcom	Yes				
Street Fighter Zero 3	Sega Saturn	August 6, 1999	Capcom	Yes				
Street Fighter Zero 3 Upper	Arcade	2001	Capcom	Yes				
Street Fighter: The Movie (arcade game)	Arcade	June 1995	Incredible Technologies	Yes	Yes	Yes	Yes	
Street Fighter: The Movie (console video game)	PlayStation	August 11, 1995	Capcom	Yes	Yes	Yes	Yes	
Street Fighter: The Movie (console video game)	Sega Saturn	August 11, 1995	Capcom	Yes	Yes	Yes	Yes	
Strider	Amiga	1989		Yes	Yes	Yes	Yes	
Strider	Atari ST	1989		Yes	Yes	Yes	Yes	
Strider	Arcade	March 7, 1989	Capcom	Yes	Yes	Yes		
Strider	Commodore 64	1989		Yes	Yes	Yes	Yes	
Strider	DOS	1989		Yes	Yes	Yes	Yes	
Strider	PlayStation	2000		Yes	Yes	Yes	Yes	
Strider	Master System	1991	Sega	Yes	Yes	Yes	Yes	
Strider	Sega Mega Drive/Genesis	September 29, 1990	Sega	Yes	Yes	Yes	Yes	
Strider	TurboGrafx-CD	September 22, 1994		Yes	Yes	Yes	Yes	
Strider	Virtual Console	November 15, 2011		Yes	Yes			
Strider	X68000	1991		Yes				
Strider	ZX Spectrum	1989		Yes	Yes	Yes	Yes	
Strider (2014 video game)	PlayStation Network	February 18, 2014	Double Helix Games/Capcom	Yes	Yes	Yes	Yes	
Strider (2014 video game)	Microsoft Windows	February 18, 2014	Double Helix Games/Capcom	Yes	Yes	Yes	Yes	
Strider (2014 video game)	Xbox Live Marketplace	February 18, 2014	Double Helix Games/Capcom	Yes	Yes	Yes	Yes	
Strider (1989 NES video game)	Nintendo Entertainment System	July 1989	Capcom		Yes			
Strider HD	PlayStation 4	February 18, 2014	Double Helix Games/Capcom	Yes	Yes	Yes	Yes	
Strider HD	Xbox One	February 18, 2014	Double Helix Games/Capcom	Yes	Yes	Yes	Yes	
Strider 2	Arcade	December 13, 1999	Capcom	Yes	Yes			
Strider 2	PlayStation	February 24, 2000	Capcom	Yes	Yes	Yes		
Strider 2	PlayStation Network	August 27, 2014	Capcom	Yes	Yes			
Strider HD	PlayStation Network	February 18, 2014	Double Helix Games/Capcom	Yes	Yes	Yes	Yes	
Strider HD	Xbox Live Marketplace	February 18, 2014	Double Helix Games/Capcom	Yes	Yes	Yes	Yes	
Strider II	Amiga	1990			Yes	Yes		
Strider II	Amstrad CPC	1990			Yes	Yes		
Strider II	Atari ST	1990			Yes	Yes		
Strider II	Commodore 64	1990			Yes	Yes		
Strider II	Game Gear	1990			Yes	Yes		
Strider II	Master System	1992			Yes	Yes		
Strider II	Sega Mega Drive/Genesis	1992			Yes	Yes		
Strider II	ZX Spectrum	1990			Yes	Yes		
Super Adventure Rockman	PlayStation	June 25, 1998	Kouyousha	Yes				
Super Adventure Rockman	Sega Saturn	June 25, 1998	Kouyousha	Yes				
Super Buster Bros.	Arcade	November 1990	Mitchell Corporation	Yes	Yes			
Super Ghouls 'n Ghosts	Game Boy Advance	July 19, 2002	Capcom	Yes	Yes	Yes		
Super Ghouls 'n Ghosts	Super Nintendo Entertainment System	October 4, 1991	Capcom	Yes	Yes	Yes		
Super Ghouls 'n Ghosts	Virtual Console	May 16, 2013	Capcom	Yes	Yes	Yes	Yes	
Super Pang	Super Nintendo Entertainment System	October 1992	Capcom	Yes	Yes			
Super Puzzle Fighter II Turbo	Arcade	May 31, 1996	Capcom	Yes	Yes	Yes		
Super Puzzle Fighter II Turbo	PlayStation	November 30, 1996	Capcom	Yes	Yes			
Super Puzzle Fighter II Turbo	Sega Saturn	1997	Capcom	Yes	Yes	Yes		
Super Puzzle Fighter II Turbo	Microsoft Windows	1997	Capcom	Yes	Yes	Yes	Yes	
Super Puzzle Fighter II Turbo HD Remix	PlayStation Network	August 30, 2007	Capcom	Yes	Yes	Yes	Yes	
Super Puzzle Fighter II Turbo HD Remix	Xbox Live Marketplace	August 29, 2007	Capcom	Yes	Yes	Yes	Yes	
Super Puzzle Fighter II X for Matching Service	Dreamcast	July 5, 2001		Yes				
Super Street Fighter II	Amiga	1995				Yes		
Super Street Fighter II	Arcade	September 10, 1993		Yes	Yes	Yes	Yes	
Super Street Fighter II	DOS	1996			Yes			
Super Street Fighter II	FM Towns	October 1994		Yes				
Super Street Fighter II	Sega Mega Drive/Genesis	June 25, 1994		Yes	Yes	Yes		
Super Street Fighter II	Super Nintendo Entertainment System	June 25, 1994		Yes	Yes	Yes		
Super Street Fighter II	Virtual Console	December 18, 2007		Yes	Yes	Yes	Yes	
Super Street Fighter II	X68000	September 30, 1994		Yes				
Super Street Fighter II Turbo	Amiga	1995				Yes		
Super Street Fighter II Turbo	Arcade	February 23, 1994	Capcom	Yes	Yes	Yes	Yes	
Super Street Fighter II Turbo	DOS	May 1995	Eurocom		Yes	Yes		
Super Street Fighter II Turbo HD Remix	PlayStation Network	November 25, 2008	Backbone Entertainment		Yes	Yes		
Super Street Fighter II Turbo HD Remix	Xbox Live Marketplace	November 26, 2008	Backbone Entertainment		Yes			
Super Street Fighter II X Grand Master Challenge for Matching Service	Dreamcast	2000	Capcom	Yes				
Super Street Fighter II: Turbo Revival	Game Boy Advance	June 13, 2001	Capcom	Yes	Yes	Yes		
Super Street Fighter IV	PlayStation 3	April 27, 2010	Dimps/Capcom	Yes	Yes	Yes		
Super Street Fighter IV	Xbox 360	April 27, 2010	Dimps/Capcom	Yes	Yes	Yes		
Super Street Fighter IV: 3D Edition	Nintendo 3DS	February 26, 2011	Dimps/Capcom	Yes	Yes	Yes	Yes	
Super Street Fighter IV: Arcade Edition	Arcade	December 16, 2010	Dimps/Capcom	Yes	Yes	Yes		
Super Street Fighter IV: Arcade Edition	PlayStation 3	June 30, 2011	Dimps/Capcom	Yes	Yes	Yes		
Super Street Fighter IV: Arcade Edition	Xbox 360	June 30, 2011	Dimps/Capcom	Yes	Yes	Yes		
Super Street Fighter IV: Arcade Edition	Microsoft Windows	July 5, 2011	QLOC	Yes	Yes	Yes	Yes	
Suzu Monogatari	PlayStation	June 1, 2000	Capcom	Yes				
Sweet Home	Nintendo Entertainment System	December 15, 1989	Capcom	Yes				
Sydney 2000	Microsoft Windows	August 14, 2000	Attention to Detail	Yes				
Sydney 2000	PlayStation	October 26, 2000	Attention to Detail	Yes				
Sydney 2000	Dreamcast	October 26, 2000	Attention to Detail	Yes				
