= Slipstream (disambiguation) =

A slipstream is a pocket of reduced pressure following behind an object moving through a fluid medium.

Slipstream may also refer to:

== People ==
- Zammis Clark, referred to as Slipstream

== Computing ==
- Slipstream (computer science), the technique of running a shortened program concurrently and ahead of the execution of the full program
- Slipstream (computing), a slang term for merging patches or updates into the original installation sources of a program
- Slipstream 5000, a 1995 racing game for PC

== Fiction ==
- Slipstream fiction, a literary genre that pushes the boundary between traditional fiction and either science fiction and/or fantasy
- Slipstream (radio drama), a BBC Radio 7 science fiction series
- Slipstream (science fiction), fictional methods of faster-than-light travel

=== Characters ===
- Slipstream (character), a Marvel Comics superhero character
- Slipstream (Transformers), several robot characters in the Transformers franchise including Transformers: Animated
- Slip Stream (G.I. Joe), a pilot character in the G.I. Joe franchise

=== Film ===
- Slipstream (unfinished film), an unfinished Steven Spielberg movie
- Slipstream (1973 film), a Canadian drama directed by David Acomba
- Slipstream (video), a 1980 concert by Jethro Tull
- Slipstream (1989 film), a post-apocalyptic adventure directed by Steven Lisberger
- Slipstream (2005 film), a time travel thriller directed by David van Eyssen
- Slipstream (2007 film), a drama written and directed by Anthony Hopkins

== Music ==
- Slipstream (band), a UK indie band

=== Albums ===
- Slipstream (Bonnie Raitt album), 2012
- Slipstream (Sherbet album) or the title song (see below), 1974
- Slipstream (Sutherland Brothers and Quiver album) or the title song, 1976

=== Songs ===
- "Slipstream" (song), by Sherbet, 1974
- "Slipstream", by Killing Joke from Extremities, Dirt and Various Repressed Emotions, 1990
- "Slipstream", by Jethro Tull from Aqualung, 1971
- "Slipstream", by Mike Oldfield from Light + Shade, 2005
- "Slipstream", by Threshold from Dead Reckoning, 2007

== Others ==
- Slipstream (arcade game), a 1995 racing game by Capcom
- Slipstream (magazine), a literary press and magazine founded in 1980
- Slipstream (sculpture), a sculpture created by Richard Wilson
- Drafting (aerodynamics), also called slipstreaming
- Team Slipstream, a UCI professional cycling team
