= Street Fighter II: Rainbow Edition =

- Title screen, depicting the multicolored "Champion Edition" logo.
- Developer: Hung Hsi Enterprise Taiwan
- Publisher: Gamtec
- Series: Street Fighter
- Platform: Arcade
- Release: 1992
- Genre: Fighting

Street Fighter II: Rainbow Edition refers to a hack of the 1992 fighting game Street Fighter II: Champion Edition developed by Taiwanese hacking group Hung Hsi Enterprise Taiwan. It adds many features and changes that were not present in the original game.

== Overview ==
Among the many changes made to the now-faster gameplay, Ryu and Ken are able to use their special move Hadouken five times in quick succession (with the ability to score a combo if more than one connects with the opponent), projectile moves (including Guile's Sonic Boom) are able to home in on the opponent, many special moves can be executed in mid-air, and the player character can be changed mid-match by pressing the start button.

== Reception ==
Despite many Street Fighter fans' claims that these changes to the gameplay were unbalanced and replaced much of the skill involved with button mashing, the game proved to be a cult favorite.

In Brazil, Street Fighter II: Rainbow Edition was nicknamed "Street Fighter de Rodoviária" (Portuguese: "Bus Terminal Street Fighter"), given the cabinets were commonly found in bus terminals, as well as bars and other places that could purchase the cheaper copycat CPS-1 boards.

== Legacy ==
James Goddard, who did Design Support on Street Fighter II Turbo, said in a Polygon interview that development on Turbo started after he played Rainbow Edition and told Capcom they had to do an update to compete. This followed much speculation due to the similarities in gameplay between the two titles.
