= Hyper Street Fighter II =

2003 video game

Hyper Street Fighter II: The Anniversary Edition
- Japanese PS2 cover art
- Developer: Capcom
- Publisher: Capcom
- Composers: Isao Abe; Syun Nishigaki
- Series: Street Fighter
- Platforms: PlayStation 2 Arcade
- Release: PlayStation 2: JP: December 18, 2003; EU: May 28, 2004; Arcade: JP: January 28, 2004; NA: 2004
- Genre: Fighting
- Modes: Single-player, multiplayer
- Arcade system: CP System II

Hyper Street Fighter II: The Anniversary Edition (Note: Japanese: ハイパーストリートファイターII -The Anniversary Edition-, Hepburn: Haipā Sutorīto Faitā II - The Anivu~āsarī Edishon -) is a 2003 fighting game developed and published by Capcom for the PlayStation 2. Created to commemorate the 15th anniversary of the Street Fighter series, it is a modified port of Super Street Fighter II Turbo (1994) in which players can control any versions of the main characters from the five Street Fighter II games previously released for the arcades.

An arcade port was released shortly afterwards in limited quantities, turning it into the sixth arcade iteration; this version ran on the same CP System II hardware as its predecessor and was the final game released for the platform. Its North American home release in 2004 was as part of Street Fighter Anniversary Collection, which also features Street Fighter III: 3rd Strike; this collection was later ported to the Xbox in all regions. In 2022, Hyper Street Fighter II was released for PlayStation 4, Xbox One, Nintendo Switch, and PC as part of Capcom Fighting Collection and also as part of Capcom Arcade 2nd Stadium.

Hyper Street Fighter II is part of the Museum of Modern Art's permanent collection of video games, used to represent Street Fighter II at large.

== Gameplay ==
The opening sequence has been altered to use a modified version of the Street Fighter II Turbo intro, in which logos of the past five games appear flashing into the screen. The background music played during the player select screen was also reverted to the theme used in Street Fighter II Turbo.

Once the game is started, the player has to select the playing speed and will be asked to choose one of the five playing styles based on prior Street Fighter II iterations, which also affects the selectable roster.

- "Normal" features the eight characters from the original version, Street Fighter II: The World Warrior. If both players choose this version of the game, mirror matches will not be allowed, as the original game did not support them, lacking different character color palettes.
- "Champ" ("Dash" in the Japanese version) is based on Street Fighter II: Champion Edition and adds the four Grand Masters as selectable fighters
- "Turbo" is based on Street Fighter II Turbo.
- "Super" adds the four new challengers from Super Street Fighter II: The New Challengers.
- "Super T" ("Super X" in the Japanese version) is based on Super Street Fighter II Turbo and adds Akuma.

This selection determines all the characteristics the chosen character originally had in the selected game, from the set of moves and animation frames, to its voice and portrait picture. This leads to a roster of 17 unique characters with a total 65 different character variations.

The stages and endings are exactly the same as in Super Street Fighter II Turbo, although some of the stages restore background elements from the original Street Fighter II that were eliminated from subsequent installments, such as the breakable signs in Ryu's stage and palm tree in Sagat's stage.

In the home versions of Hyper Street Fighter II, the player can choose to play the game with the soundtracks from the CPS-1 or CPS-2 versions, as well as the remixed soundtrack previously used in the FM Towns versions of Super Street Fighter II and the 3DO version of Super Street Fighter II Turbo. An edited version of Street Fighter II: The Animated Movie is also included as a bonus.

== See also ==
- Darkstalkers Chronicle: The Chaos Tower, a similar release by Capcom
- Street Fighter Alpha Anthology, a similar release by Capcom
