= Street Fighter 30th Anniversary Collection =

- Developer: Digital Eclipse
- Publisher: Capcom
- Series: Street Fighter
- Platforms: Nintendo Switch; PlayStation 4; Windows; Xbox One
- Release: WW: May 29, 2018; JP: October 25, 2018
- Genre: Fighting
- Modes: Single-player, multiplayer

Street Fighter 30th Anniversary Collection is a compilation of fighting games from the Street Fighter series, developed by Digital Eclipse and published by Capcom in celebration of the series' 30th anniversary. The collection was released for Nintendo Switch, PlayStation 4, Windows, and Xbox One in May 2018.

== Gameplay ==
Street Fighter 30th Anniversary Collection is a compilation that collects the arcade versions of twelve (thirteen for the Switch version) fighting games from the Street Fighter series:

- Street Fighter (1987)
- Street Fighter II:
  - Street Fighter II: The World Warrior (1991)
  - Street Fighter II: Champion Edition (1992)
  - Street Fighter II Turbo: Hyper Fighting (1992)
  - Super Street Fighter II: The New Challengers (1993)
    - Super Street Fighter II: The Tournament Battle (1993, Switch exclusive)
  - Super Street Fighter II Turbo (1994)
- Street Fighter Alpha:
  - Street Fighter Alpha: Warriors' Dreams (1995)
  - Street Fighter Alpha 2 (1996)
  - Street Fighter Alpha 3 (1998)
- Street Fighter III:
  - Street Fighter III: New Generation (1997)
  - Street Fighter III: 2nd Impact - Giant Attack (1997)
  - Street Fighter III: 3rd Strike - Fight for the Future (1999)

While playing a single-player mode in any of the twelve (or thirteen) games, the player can use save states to save and resume at any time. Four of the games (Hyper Fighting, Super Turbo, Alpha 3, and 3rd Strike) support online multiplayer, including ranked matchmaking. Online lobbies can support up to four players and a player can fight against a CPU opponent while waiting for online battles to be ready. The Nintendo Switch version of the game includes an exclusive eight-player tournament mode for Super Street Fighter II that can be played locally with four consoles.

The collection includes bonus features such as a museum to view concept art, pitch documents and facts about each release; a music player to listen to tracks across the series; an interactive timeline that chronicles the series' history; and biographies that provide background information, stories, sprite art and animations for characters in the series.

== Development and release ==
Street Fighter 30th Anniversary Collection was developed by Digital Eclipse and published by Capcom. To provide minimal latency in online play, the development team implemented "rewind" technology and allowed players to adjust their own input latency via an in-game menu.

Capcom announced the collection in December 2017 at the finals of the Capcom Cup Street Fighter tournament. The collection was released for Nintendo Switch, PlayStation 4, Windows, and Xbox One on 29 May 2018, although it was delayed in Japan to address fan feedback. A digital copy of Ultra Street Fighter IV is included with pre-orders of the PlayStation 4, Windows, and Xbox One versions of the collection.

This compilation does not include Hyper Street Fighter II (2003), previously included in Street Fighter Anniversary Collection, nor does it include Street Fighter Alpha 2 Gold, Street Fighter Alpha 3 Upper and Hyper Street Fighter Alpha, which were previously included in Street Fighter Alpha Anthology. Hyper Street Fighter II and Alpha 3 Upper would be re-released within Capcom Fighting Collection in 2022 and Capcom Fighting Collection 2 in 2025, respectively.

In Japan, the compilation is known as Street Fighter 30th Anniversary Collection International. In addition to the international version of each game, it also features the Japanese versions.

== Reception ==
Reception

Aggregate score
Aggregator	Score
Metacritic	NS: 81/100; PC: 79/100; PS4: 83/100; XONE: 80/100

Review scores
Publication	Score
Destructoid	9/10
Eurogamer	8/10
GameSpot	8/10
IGN	8.7/10
Jeuxvideo.com	14/20
PlayStation Official Magazine – UK	9/10

The collection has been met with mostly positive critic reviews.

It reached sixth in the UK sales charts in its first week, while in Japan, the PlayStation 4 version was fourth in retail sales and the Switch version was sixth, selling over 21,000 copies between them.

By November 2019, the collection had sold 1 million copies worldwide. By September 2026, sales reached 3.90 million.
