= Street Fighter Alpha Anthology =

2006 video game compilation

- European cover art
- Developer: Capcom Production Studio 2
- Publisher: Capcom
- Series: Street Fighter
- Platform: PlayStation 2
- Release: JP: May 25, 2006; NA: June 13, 2006; AU: June 30, 2006; EU: July 7, 2006
- Genre: Fighting
- Modes: Single-player, multiplayer

Street Fighter Alpha Anthology, released in Japan as Street Fighter Zero: Fighters' Generation, is a 2006 fighting game compilation that collects the Street Fighter Alpha series.

The game also includes both Super Gem Fighter Mini Mix and the remixed version of the console-exclusive Street Fighter Alpha 2 Gold, as well as two secret games.

== Main games ==
Street Fighter Alpha: Warriors' Dreams (1995)
This game is just a completed predecessor of the following game with a plot and settings that are both no longer canon.
Street Fighter Alpha 2 (1996)
This successor takes place still in the year of 1987, about six months after the events of Street Fighter and also taking place six years before the events of Street Fighter II.
Street Fighter Alpha 3 (1998)
Moving forward in the year of 1989, taking place only two years after the events of the previous game, and also only four years before the events of Street Fighter II.

== Additional games ==
=== Street Fighter Alpha 2 Gold ===
This is a remixed version that combines elements from the previous console version and the Japanese arcade release Street Fighter Zero 2 Alpha. The version of Alpha 2 Gold allows the player to select Cammy in all the game modes, including the single-player Arcade mode (in which she is given her own storyline and ending), not just Versus and Training mode. The soundtracks for each game are from the arcade version, with the exception of Alpha 2 Gold, which uses the arranged soundtrack from the PlayStation and Sega Saturn versions. The original Alpha gives the player a choice between CP System and CPS II-style soundtracks (the former is based on the CPS Changer version of the game).

All of the games in the compilation includes Arcade, Versus, and Training modes, as well as Survival mode and Dramatic Battle mode for the Alpha games. The Dramatic Battle mode featured in the original Alpha, Alpha 2, and Alpha 2 Gold is the same as the one featured in the Japanese arcade version of Street Fighter Zero 2 Alpha, allowing the player to create their own team of characters and fight against a specific series of opponents, namely Adon, Sagat, M. Bison, and Akuma (Alpha) or Shin Akuma (Alpha 2 and Alpha 2 Gold). The original Dramatic Battle mode from the first Alpha, which features Ryu and Ken against Bison, is available in the game as a secret.

=== Super Gem Fighter Mini Mix (1997) ===
As another CP System II arcade fighting game that features 10+ playable characters mostly from Street Fighter Alpha 2 as well as the rest of the characters making backstage cameo appearances, this crossover has been added as a revised version to the compilation. This game also made a brief appearance in Street Fighter Alpha: The Animation (2000), where Sakura is seen playing it on her WonderSwan gaming handheld which is also why it has been added to the list of games.

== Unlockable games ==
=== Street Fighter Alpha 3 Upper (2001) ===
In addition to the default games, this compilation also includes Street Fighter Alpha 3 Upper, based on an updated arcade version of Alpha 3 released in Japan that includes the extended character roster from the console versions of the game. Neither the original Alpha 3 nor Alpha 3 Upper includes the World Tour mode introduced in the PlayStation version of Alpha 3 nor any of the additional characters that were added in the Game Boy Advance version of the game (which is also called Street Fighter Alpha 3 Upper but is unrelated to the version featured in this anthology) or Alpha 3 Max, the PlayStation Portable version of Alpha 3.

=== Hyper Street Fighter Alpha ===
After the player completes all the default games (as well as Alpha 3 Upper) at least once, a second secret game titled Hyper Street Fighter Alpha will become available. Based on the same concept employed in Darkstalkers Chronicle and Hyper Street Fighter II, Hyper Alpha is a Versus/Training mode-only version of Alpha 3 where the player can select between different versions of the characters featured in the Alpha games. Hyper Alpha also features secret fighting styles in addition to the ones featured in Alpha 3 as well as a soundtrack that not only spans the Alpha series, but includes music from the earlier Street Fighter II and Final Fight games.

=== Secret Options Menu ===
A secret options menu is also accessible in each game, which allows the player access to specific revisions of the game and all of their features, and which also allows them to create their own custom revision by enabling and disabling certain features.

== HDD install feature ==
Street Fighter Alpha Anthology is one of only a handful of U.S. PS2 titles that support the HDD install feature. Using an original "fat" PS2 console, with the official HDD installed, allows to install 2GB of data to the HDD. This eliminates virtually all load times from the compilation.

== Regional differences ==
The Japanese version of the compilation, Fighters' Generation, differs slightly in its content of games. The Japanese version of the compilation features each of the Street Fighter Zero arcade games, with the Japanese arcade versions of Street Fighter Zero 2 and Street Fighter Zero 2 Alpha as part of the default lineup. The US version of Street Fighter Alpha 2, as well as Street Fighter Zero 2 Dash (the Japanese version of Alpha 2 Gold) as secret "arranged" versions of Zero 2 and Zero 2 Alpha are featured in the Japanese compilation due to their additional characters (Evil Ryu in the US Alpha 2 and Cammy in Zero 2 Dash). In the North American and PAL versions of the compilation, the default versions of Alpha 2 and Alpha 2 Gold are the same as their "arranged" counterparts in the Japanese compilation. The Japanese version also includes in-game character movelists which can be brought up by pausing.

In the main menu, the Japanese compilation uses the same illustrations that were used in the sales flyers promoting the original arcade versions, while the Western versions of the compilation uses the art used for the American flyers. Since Alpha 2 Gold was never released for the arcades in North America, the cover artwork of Street Fighter Collection (which features the Super Street Fighter II renditions of Ryu, Chun-Li, and Cammy, as well as the other "New Challengers" who were not in Alpha 2 Gold) was used instead.

== See also ==
- Street Fighter Collection
- Street Fighter Anniversary Collection
- Street Fighter 30th Anniversary Collection
