= Street Fighter Anniversary Collection =

- North American PS2 cover art
- Developer: Capcom
- Publisher: Capcom
- Platforms: PlayStation 2, Xbox
- Release: PlayStation 2: NA: August 31, 2004; Xbox: JP: October 28, 2004; EU: October 29, 2004; AU: November 12, 2004; NA: February 22, 2005
- Genre: Fighting
- Modes: Single-player, multiplayer

Street Fighter Anniversary Collection is a bundle of two Street Fighter games: Hyper Street Fighter II and Street Fighter III: 3rd Strike. It was released in 2004 for the PlayStation 2 and Xbox. Both versions are nearly identical, but the latter version offers online competitive play. The PlayStation 2 version of the bundle was only released in North America, since the PS2 versions of Hyper Street Fighter II and 3rd Strike were released as separate stand-alone games in Japan, with the PAL region only receiving a separate release of Hyper Street Fighter II on the PS2. The Xbox bundle was released for Xbox in all three regions, and the Xbox 360 is backwards compatible with the title.

== Games ==
=== Hyper Street Fighter II – The Anniversary Edition (2003) ===
Hyper Street Fighter II is an arranged version of Super Street Fighter II Turbo that allows players to select from all playable incarnations of the characters that were featured in the five arcade instalments of Street Fighter II. An earlier form of this concept was featured in the compilation Street Fighter Collection 2 (for the PlayStation), which included a "Deluxe Versus Mode" allowing two players to fight each other using characters from the first three versions of the game. Initially released as a PlayStation 2 game in Japan, it had a limited arcade release in Japan and Asia.

Hyper allows players to select from up to five different incarnations of the character roster: the original.

- NORMAL
  - It features the eight characters from the original Street Fighter II (1991). If both players choose this version of the game, mirror matches will not be allowed, as the original game did not support them, even lacking different character color palettes.
- CHAMP (DASH in the Japanese version)
  - It is based on Street Fighter II: Champion Edition (1992), and adds the four Shadaloo Bosses as playable fighters.
- TURBO (DASH TURBO in the Japanese version)
  - It is based on Street Fighter II: Hyper Fighting (1992), where new moves are added and the game balance is upgraded.
- SUPER
  - Adds the four new characters from Super Street Fighter II (1993), and is also the best mode for players who are beginners.
- SUPER T (SUPER X in the Japanese version)
  - It is based on Super Street Fighter II Turbo (1994), where Super Combos are added, and also features Akuma as both the bonus final boss and hidden playable fighter.

Each version of the characters plays exactly as they were featured in said game (albeit minor bugs/changes, such as Super Sagat's Tiger Shots and Vega's Wall Dive command), including the use of the same animation frames and voice actors. Players can pit a character from one version against another version from a different game (i.e.: "Champ" Ken vs. "Super" Cammy, "Normal" Guile vs. "Turbo" Chun-Li). Rules from each game apply when selecting one's roster (for example, one cannot choose the same character as the other player if both are playing on "Normal" or play as the four bosses). In the single-player game, all the opponents faced are in "Super T" mode.

The fighting stages use the same backgrounds and graphics from Super Turbo but restore a few breakable elements not seen since the original Street Fighter II: the Fūrinkazan signs in Ryu's stage; the dual barrels and stack of boxes in Ken's stage; and the lamp from E. Honda's stage. The character endings are the same as Super Turbo. The game also allows the option to set between CPS, CPS II and arranged renditions of the game's soundtrack (the arranged versions were originally used for the FM Towns and 3DO versions of Super and Super Turbo respectively). When using the CPS orchestration, CPS-style music from the obscure Japanese X68000 port of Super Street Fighter II is used for the "New Challengers" and Akuma, as they were not present in the original CPS SFII trilogy and thus did not originally have any CPS arrangements. All bonus stages are removed, although the background music is retained and can be found in the gallery section of the main menu.

In addition, the game also includes the opening and ending sequences from all five Street Fighter II games and an edited version of Street Fighter II: The Animated Movie as bonuses.

=== Street Fighter III 3rd Strike – Fight for the Future (1999) ===
The port of Street Fighter III 3rd Strike is primarily the same as the Dreamcast version of the game from 2000, with the added post-match grading system, increased hit detection accuracy with the Progressive Hit Frame System, and other extras over the arcade original. Additionally, the Xbox version could be played online via Xbox Live. In line with other online-enabled games on the Xbox, multiplayer on Xbox Live was available to players until 15 April 2010. The game is now playable online again on the replacement Xbox Live servers called Insignia. (The Dreamcast version featured an online versus mode, but this feature was only available in the Japanese release.)

== Special feature ==
=== Street Fighter II: The Animated Movie ===
Also known as Street Fighter II Movie (1994) in Japan, this feature film can also be found on the PlayStation 2 version, as well as the North American and European Xbox versions.

Capcom aimed at avoiding to receive the rating of M-for-Mature, by making this version of the film to be more censored than the PG-13 release (originally made during development as an R-rated film) in terms of foul language that mostly came from Ken, Guile, E. Honda, and Dee Jay's dialogues; graphic nudity in Chun Li's explicit shower scene; and contains some other minor cuts to scenes involving intense brutal and bloody violence.

== Reception ==
Reception

Review scores
Publication	Score
1Up.com	B
G4	3/5 stars
Game Informer	8 / 10
GamePro	20 / 20
GameRevolution	C−
GameSpot	8.1 / 10 (PS2) 8.2 / 10 (Xbox)
GameSpy	4.5/5 stars
GamesRadar+	68%
IGN	8.5 / 10
Official Xbox Magazine (US)	8.9 / 10
Play	91%
PlayStation: The Official Magazine	8 / 10
Indiana Gazette	4/5 stars

There is no edition of Street Fighter I as part of the compilation to complete the original non-Alpha trilogy, because of the game not receiving the same global popularity as its second installment. The game would instead appear 15 years later on the Street Fighter 30th Anniversary Collection.

The initial Japanese release for Xbox was pulled from shelves within a week of release due to a sound bug. Though initially this was believed to be because the title was discovered to be region-free, Capcom confirmed the title's lack of regional lockout was not a mistake, but an intentional decision by the company.
