= Street Fighter II Turbo =

1992 video game

Street Fighter II Turbo: Hyper Fighting
- Arcade flyer featuring Ryu
- Developer: Capcom
- Publisher: Capcom
- Producer: Yoshiki Okamoto
- Designers: Akira Nishitani; Akira Yasuda
- Composers: Yoko Shimomura; Isao Abe
- Series: Street Fighter
- Platforms: Arcade, Super NES
- Release: Arcade: JP: December 17, 1992; WW: December 21, 1992; Super NES: JP: July 10, 1993; NA: August 1, 1993; EU: October 1993; UK: November 5, 1993; BR: December 1993
- Genre: Fighting
- Modes: Single-player, multiplayer
- Arcade system: CP System

Street Fighter II Turbo: Hyper Fighting, released as Street Fighter II Dash Turbo (Note: Japanese: ストリートファイターII ダッシュターボ, Hepburn: Sutorīto Faitā Tsū Dasshu Tābo; stylized as Street Fighter II′ Turbo, with a prime symbol representing the word "Dash") in Japan, is a 1992 fighting game developed and published by Capcom for arcades. It is the third arcade version of Street Fighter II, part of the Street Fighter franchise, following Street Fighter II: Champion Edition, and was initially released as an enhancement kit for that game. Released less than a year after the previous installment, Hyper Fighting introduced a faster playing speed and new special moves for certain characters, as well as further refinement to the character balance.

Hyper Fighting is the final arcade game in the Street Fighter II series to use the original CP System hardware. It was distributed as an upgrade kit designed to be installed into Champion Edition printed circuit boards. The next game, Super Street Fighter II, uses the CP System's successor, the CP System II.

== Gameplay ==
Chun-Li performs her Kikoken special move against Dhalsim.

Turbo features faster playing speed compared to Champion Edition. As a result, the inputs for special moves and combos requires more precise timing. The faster playing speed also allowed players to get into battle quicker, as well as to react quicker. All of the fighters, with the exception of Guile and the four Grand Masters, were each given at least one new special move.

- Ryu and Ken can now perform the Hurricane Kick mid-air.
- E. Honda has the Super Body Slam, an anti-aerial attack.
- Blanka has a vertical rolling attack in addition to his standard one.
- Chun-Li now has a projectile technique, the Kikoken, and can also perform the Spinning Bird Kick mid-air.
- Zangief has a Turbo Clothesline in addition to the standard Spinning Clothesline.
- Dhalsim has the Yoga Teleport, which allows him to instantly transport himself near his opponent from a certain distance.

Each fighter also received a new default palette. The original palettes are now featured as alternate palettes for each character, replacing the ones that were in Champion Edition. The only character exempt to this change is M. Bison, who retains his original default palette, but still gets a different alternate palette.

== Development ==
James Goddard, who did Design Support on Street Fighter II Turbo, said in a Polygon interview that development on Turbo started after he played the hack Street Fighter II: Rainbow Edition and told Capcom they had to develop an update to compete.

== Ports ==
Year	Platform	Media	Developer	Publisher	Notes
1993	Super NES	20 Megabit ROM cartridge	Capcom	Capcom	Includes Champion Edition rules as an alternative mode.
1993	Mega Drive/Genesis	24 Megabit ROM cartridge	Capcom	Capcom	Turbo rules and speed were included as a mode in Street Fighter II Special Champion Edition.
1998	Sega Saturn	CD-ROM	Capcom	Capcom	Included in Capcom Generation 5. Released exclusively in Japan.
1998	PlayStation	CD-ROM	Capcom	Capcom; Virgin Interactive (EU)	Included in Street Fighter Collection 2.
2005	PlayStation 2	DVD-ROM	Digital Eclipse	Capcom	Included in Capcom Classics Collection Vol. 1. Based on the PS version.
2005	Xbox	DVD-ROM	Digital Eclipse	Capcom	Included in Capcom Classics Collection Vol. 1. Based on the PS version.
2006	PlayStation Portable	UMD	Capcom	Capcom	Included in Capcom Classics Collection: Reloaded. Based on the PS version.
2006	Xbox 360	Online distribution	Sensory Sweep Studios	Capcom	
2017	Super NES Classic	Internal Flash Memory	Capcom	Capcom	Re-release of 1993 Super NES port.
2018	PlayStation 4	BD-ROM	Digital Eclipse	Capcom	Included in Street Fighter 30th Anniversary Collection.
2018	Xbox One	BD-ROM	Digital Eclipse	Capcom	Included in Street Fighter 30th Anniversary Collection.
2018	Nintendo Switch	ROM cartridge	Digital Eclipse	Capcom	Included in Street Fighter 30th Anniversary Collection.
2018	Windows	Online distribution	Digital Eclipse	Capcom	Included in Street Fighter 30th Anniversary Collection.
2022	Evercade EXP	Online distribution	Capcom	Capcom	Included as one of 18 built-in titles.

=== Super NES ===
A port titled Street Fighter II Turbo was released for the Super Famicom on July 11, 1993 in Japan, (Note: In contrast to the arcade version, the Super Famicom port was simply titled Street Fighter II Turbo, omitting the word "Dash" from the title (hence why the prime symbol is absent from the title of this version). The title of the overseas version is the same.) and for the Super Nintendo Entertainment System (Super NES) in August 1993 in North America and October 1993 in the PAL region. The port was developed using the SNES port of the original Street Fighter II as its base, but with a larger cartridge size of 20 megabits. Despite being titled Turbo, this port also contains the Champion Edition version of the game in the form of a "Normal" mode. The game's playing speed is adjustable in Turbo mode by up to four settings by default, with a cheat code that allows up to six faster settings. Other cheat codes allow players to enable and disable special moves in Versus mode, as well as play through the single-player mode with all of the special moves disabled.

The pitch change in the characters' voices when they perform a variation of their special moves based on the strength level of the attack was removed. However, the voice clips of the announcer saying the names of each country were restored; the barrel-breaking bonus stage that was removed in the first SNES port was also restored. The graphics of each character's ending were changed to make them more accurate to the arcade version. Sound effects featuring people or animals shouting after a round ended were added as well, an aesthetic element that was not present in the arcade version of Turbo, but rather was added in Super Street Fighter II.

Nintendo re-released Turbo in September 2017 as part of the company's Super NES Classic Edition.

=== Other releases ===
The Sega Mega Drive/Genesis version, Street Fighter II: Special Champion Edition, while based primarily on Champion Edition, allows players to play the game with Turbo rules as well. The game's content is almost identical to the SNES version of Street Fighter II Turbo.

Turbo is included in Street Fighter Collection 2 (Capcom Generation 5) for the Sega Saturn and PlayStation. The PlayStation port was later included in Capcom Classics Collection Vol. 1 for PlayStation 2 and Xbox, as well as Capcom Classics Collection: Reloaded for the PlayStation Portable. A stand-alone re-release of Hyper Fighting was also released for the Xbox 360 via Xbox Live Arcade which features an online versus mode. It was also released for the iPod Touch, iPhone, iPad, and Android, along with Street Fighter II and Champion Edition, as part of Capcom Arcade.

The game also had an unofficial port for the Virtual Boy, under the name Hyper Fighting.

== Reception ==
Contemporary reviews (SNES conversion)

Review scores
Publication	Score
Computer and Video Games	95%
Edge	9/10
Electronic Gaming Monthly	38/40
Famitsu	36/40
GameFan	389/400
GamePro	20/20
GamesMaster	96%
Official Nintendo Magazine	97%
SNES Force	96%
Super Play	96%
Total!	5/5

=== Arcade ===
In Japan, Game Machine listed Street Fighter II Dash Turbo as the second most successful table arcade cabinet of January 1993, outperforming titles such as Capcom's own Warriors of Fate and Street Fighter II Dash. Street Fighter II' Turbo went on to become the highest-grossing arcade game of 1993 in Japan.

In North America, the RePlay arcade charts listed Street Fighter II Turbo as the top-grossing software conversion kit in March 1993, and then again April and June 1993. It was also one of the five top-grossing arcade games during Summer 1993.

=== Console ===
In Japan, the Super Famicom version topped the Famitsu sales charts in July 1993.

Worldwide, the SNES version sold 4.1 million copies in total, making it the ninth best-selling game for the console.

=== Accolades ===
In the February 1994 issue of Gamest, Street Fighter II Turbo, along with Super Street Fighter II, was nominated for Best Game of 1993, but lost to Samurai Spirits. Turbo was ranked sixth, while placing fifth in the category of Best Fighting Games. Nintendo Power rated the game the third best SNES game of 1993.

=== Retrospective ===
Retrospective reviews

Aggregate scores
Aggregator	Score		
Aggregator	SNES	Wii	Xbox 360
GameRankings	82%		73%
Metacritic			76/100

Review scores
Publication	Score		
Publication	SNES	Wii	Xbox 360
1Up.com			B+
AllGame	4.5/5	4/5	3/5
Computer and Video Games			9/10
Eurogamer		9/10	7/10
GameSpot		7.5/10	6.7/10
GamesRadar+			4/5
GameTrailers			8/10
IGN			7.5/10
Official Nintendo Magazine		85%	
Official Xbox Magazine (UK)			9/10
Official Xbox Magazine (US)			9/10

In 1996, GamesMaster ranked the game ninth on their list of the "Top 100 Games of All Time." In 1997, Electronic Gaming Monthly named Street Fighter II Turbo the best arcade game of all time; they also listed the Super NES conversion as the fifth best console game of all time, explaining that it was the last and best refinement of Street Fighter II before the basic formula of the series changed with the Super and Alpha installments. In 2018, Complex ranked the SNES version sixth on their list of "The Best Super Nintendo Games of All Time", calling it the best fighting game on the console.
