= Street Fighter II: Champion Edition =

1992 video game

- Japanese arcade flyer
- Developer: Capcom
- Publisher: Capcom
- Producer: Yoshiki Okamoto
- Designers: Akira Nishitani; Akira Yasuda
- Composers: Yoko Shimomura; Isao Abe
- Series: Street Fighter
- Platforms: Arcade, PC Engine, Genesis/Mega Drive, X68000, CPS Changer
- Release: March 1992: Arcade; NA/EU: March 1992; JP: April 17, 1992; WW: May 13, 1992 PC Engine; JP: June 12, 1993 Genesis/Mega Drive (Special Champion Edition/Plus); JP: September 28, 1993; NA: September 1993; EU: October 29, 1993 X68000; JP: November 26, 1993
- Genre: Fighting
- Modes: Single-player, multiplayer
- Arcade system: CP System

Street Fighter II: Champion Edition, released as Street Fighter II Dash (Note: Japanese: ストリートファイターII ダッシュ, Hepburn: Sutorīto Faitā Tsū Dasshu) (stylized as Street Fighter II′ with a prime symbol) (Note: The prime symbol is still present in the international version of the logo, but is left unspoken.) in Japan, is a 1992 fighting game developed and published by Capcom for arcades. It is the first of several updated versions of Street Fighter II: The World Warrior (1991), and part of the Street Fighter series. The main changes are the addition of the four grand masters (the final four computer-controlled opponents in the single-player mode) as playable characters and mirror matches. The fighting techniques of the eight main characters from the original game were further balanced for competitive play.

Champion Edition was followed several months later by Street Fighter II Turbo.

== Gameplay ==
Sagat vs. M. Bison. The ability to play as the Grand Masters was made possible in Champion Edition.

Champion Edition feature the following changes from the World Warrior iteration of Street Fighter II.

In addition to the standard eight fighters, the four Grand Masters (Balrog, Vega, Sagat, and M. Bison), the final set of opponents that the player face when fighting against the CPU, are now playable fighters. The Grand Masters can be used when either fighting the CPU or against another human player. The Grand Masters in Champion Edition are considerably toned down from the CPU-only iterations from World Warrior; however, they remain relatively strong compared to the original eight. The Grand Masters have a standard ending sequence after completing the single player mode which shows portraits of all four characters (with the character used by the player to clear the game on top), overlaid with scrolling text specific to the character while sinister-sounding music plays.

Champion Edition is also the first game in the series to feature mirror matches - the ability to match-up any character against a clone version of themselves. To distinguish each player, one character will be assigned their standard palette, while the opponent will be wearing an alternate color scheme (e.g. a red dress for Chun-Li, blue skin for Blanka) and have a blue name tag under their life bar. As a result, the single player mode now has the player facing against all 12 fighters, with the additional match being a mirror match. The player can also pick each character's standard or alternate scheme on their own volition, which is determined by which button is used when selecting the character at the player select screen.

The techniques for the original eight were refined to adjust the game's overall balance, with Ryu's and Ken's fighting styles being further differentiated from each other starting with this entry.

Graphical changes include different color palettes for the backgrounds of each fighter's stages, redrawn character portraits and revised ending visuals for some of the characters. There is new background music for the staff roll sequence.

== Releases ==
Year	Platform	Media	Developer	Publisher	Notes
1993	PC Engine	20 Megabit HuCard	Capcom	NEC Home Electronics	Released exclusively in Japan. Later released worldwide via the Wii Virtual Console.
1993	Genesis/Mega Drive	24 Megabit ROM cartridge	Capcom	Capcom	Titled Street Fighter II': Special Champion Edition. Includes an additional game mode based on Hyper Fighting. Later re-released on the Wii Virtual Console, the Sega Genesis Mini, and the Nintendo Classics service. Released in Japan as Street Fighter II' Plus: Champion Edition.
1993	X68000	4 x 5.25" floppy disks	Capcom	Capcom	Released exclusively in Japan.
1997	Master System	ROM cartridge	Tec Toy	Tec Toy	Released exclusively in Brazil.
1998	Sega Saturn	CD-ROM	Capcom	Capcom	Included in Capcom Generation 5. Released exclusively in Japan.
1998	PlayStation	CD-ROM	Capcom	Capcom	Included in Street Fighter Collection 2.
2005	PlayStation 2	DVD-ROM	Digital Eclipse	Capcom	Included in Capcom Classics Collection Vol. 1. Based on the PS1 version.
2005	Xbox	DVD-ROM	Digital Eclipse	Capcom	Included in Capcom Classics Collection Vol. 1. Based on the PS1 version.
2006	PlayStation Portable	UMD	Capcom	Capcom	Included in Capcom Classics Collection: Reloaded. Based on the PS1 version.
2018	PlayStation 4	BD-ROM	Digital Eclipse	Capcom	Included in Street Fighter 30th Anniversary Collection.
2018	Xbox One	BD-ROM	Digital Eclipse	Capcom	Included in Street Fighter 30th Anniversary Collection.
2018	Nintendo Switch	ROM cartridge	Digital Eclipse	Capcom	Included in Street Fighter 30th Anniversary Collection.
2018	Windows	Online distribution	Digital Eclipse	Capcom	Included in Street Fighter 30th Anniversary Collection.

=== PC Engine ===
The PC Engine version was published by NEC Home Electronics and released exclusively in Japan on June 12, 1993. Unlike the Super NES version of The World Warrior, it includes the barrel-breaking bonus stage and numerous sound clips. This version was released on a 20-Megabit HuCard, and with optional controllers with more buttons. This version was released on Virtual Console on November 16, 2009.

=== Genesis/Mega Drive ===
The Genesis/Mega Drive version, titled Street Fighter II': Special Champion Edition and released as Street Fighter II Dash Plus (Note: Japanese: ストリートファイターII ダッシュプラス, Hepburn: Sutorīto Faitā Tsū Dasshu Purasu) (stylized as Street Fighter II′ Plus) in Japan, was first released in Japan on September 28, 1993, followed by North America the same month, and Europe on October 29, 1993. It is the first of two Street Fighter II versions for the console and is in a 24 megabit cartridge. A six-button control pad was made primarily for it.

This version was originally intended to be a standalone port of Champion Edition, similar to the PC Engine version. The Genesis/Mega Drive version was announced in March 1993 and was originally intended for release around July 1993. However, the game's release was later delayed to September 1993 because the two prototypes in early 1993 did not satisfy the Capcom executives. Following the announcement of Street Fighter II Turbo for the SNES, Sega had ordered its version to be delayed so that Capcom could add all of the extra content from the Turbo version as well, resulting in the title change.

In Brazil, Tectoy released a special Mega Drive III bundle containing Street Fighter II': Special Champion Edition and a six-button controller on 6 December 1993. The edition was among several game-specific Mega Drive packages marketed by Tectoy in the country.

Street Fighter II: Special Champion Edition was released as a plug and play system in 2005 as part of the "Play TV Legends" series by Radica Games. It also includes the Genesis version of Ghouls 'n Ghosts.

=== X68000 ===
On November 26, 1993, Capcom released an X68000 port of Champion Edition exclusively in Japan, which consisted of four floppy disks. The port is almost identical to the arcade version, with identical graphics and almost identical soundtrack. The game includes a joystick adapter for the Super Famicom and Mega Drive versions of Capcom's CPS Fighter joystick controller. On an X68030 with multiple PCM (pulse-code modulation) drivers installed, the music and voice quality can match that of the arcade version's ADPCM sound system.

=== Other releases ===
Street Fighter II Turbo for the SNES, while based on the succeeding game in the series, allows players to choose between Champion Edition rules (Normal mode) and Hyper Fighting rules (Turbo mode).

The arcade version is included in Street Fighter Collection 2 (Capcom Generation 5) for the PlayStation and Sega Saturn, as well as Capcom Classics Collection Vol. 1 for the PlayStation 2 and Xbox and Capcom Classics Collection: Reloaded for PlayStation Portable. In 2011, Street Fighter II: Champion Edition was included alongside Street Fighter II and Street Fighter II Turbo as part of the Street Fighter II Collection for iOS devices. Arcade1Up later released a home arcade cabinet featuring Street Fighter II: Champion Edition, Super Street Fighter II: The New Challengers and Super Street Fighter II Turbo.

== Reception ==
Contemporary reviews
Review scores
Publication	Scores		
Publication	Arcade	Genesis/Mega Drive	PC Engine
Computer and Video Games		94%	92%
Edge		8/10	8/10
Electronic Games		90%	
Electronic Gaming Monthly		33/40	
Famitsu		30/40; 10/10	34/40
GameFan		389/400	374/400
GamePro		5/5	
Gamers		A	
GamesMaster		95%	
Gamest	49/60		
Mega		92%	
MegaTech		95%	
Play Meter	94%		

Retrospective reviews

Aggregate score
Aggregator	Score			
Aggregator	Arcade	Sega Genesis	TurboGrafx-16	Wii
GameRankings		78% (4 reviews)		

Review scores
Publication	Score			
Publication	Arcade	Sega Genesis	TurboGrafx-16	Wii
AllGame	4/5	4.5/5	4/5	
Eurogamer				8/10
IGN				7/10
Nintendo Life				8/10

=== Arcade ===
In Japan alone, 140,000 Street Fighter II Dash arcade hardware units were sold at ¥160,000 (US$1,300) each, earning ¥22.4 billion ($182 million) in hardware sales revenue (equivalent to $430 million in 2025). In the United States, between 20,000 and 25,000 Champion Edition arcade units were sold, similar to Street Fighter II: The World Warrior. This totals about 160,000–165,000 Champion Edition arcade units sold in Japan and the United States.

In Japan, Game Machine listed Street Fighter II Dash as the most successful table arcade cabinet of May 1992, outperforming games such as Sonic Wings (Aero Fighters). Street Fighter II Dash went on to become the second highest-grossing arcade game of 1992, just below The World Warrior. Dash was also the fourth highest-grossing arcade game of 1993 in Japan.

In the United States, Champion Edition drew a high amount of orders upon its debut in March 1992. It was number one on RePlay's May 1992 coin-op earnings chart for upright arcade cabinets, and remained at the top of the charts through summer up until September 1992. Champion Edition was also the top-grossing overall video game on the Play Meter arcade charts in June 1992, and remained there through September 1992. It went on to be the highest-grossing dedicated arcade game of 1992 in the United States, according to RePlay and the Amusement & Music Operators Association (AMOA). Later on RePlay's charts, Champion Edition was number four on the upright cabinet charts in April and May 1993. It was one of the top five highest-grossing conversion kits of 1993.

In the United Kingdom, the game was also a major hit, like the original Street Fighter II. In Australia, where the game cost AU$6,000 or US$4,406 (equivalent to $10,100 in 2025) per unit, the launch of Champion Edition drew large crowds queuing up outside arcades to play the game. On Australia's Timezone monthly arcade charts published in the June 1992 issue of Leisure Line magazine, Street Fighter II: Champion Edition was the top-grossing arcade conversion kit.

Street Fighter II': Champion Edition's worldwide arcade earnings exceeded $2.3 billion in gross revenue (equivalent to $5.28 billion in 2025), making it one of the top three highest-grossing arcade games of all time, after Pac-Man (1980) and Space Invaders (1978).

=== Accolades ===
Upon its North American debut at the American Coin Machine Exposition (ACME) in March 1993, it was declared the "game of the show" by RePlay and Play Meter magazines.

Street Fighter II Dash was awarded Best Game of 1992 in the Sixth Annual Grand Prize (in Japanese), as published in the February 1993 issue of Gamest (in Japanese), winning once again in the category of Best Action Game. Dash placed No. 3 in Best VGM (video game music), No. 6 in Best Graphics, No. 5 in Best Direction. The Street Fighter II Image Album was the No. 1 Best Album in the same issue, with the Drama CD version of Street Fighter II tied for No. 7 with the soundtrack for Star Blade. The List of Best Characters was not dominated by Street Fighter II characters this time, with the only character at the Top Ten being Chun-Li at No. 3.

=== Special Champion Edition ===
The Sega Mega Drive/Genesis version, Street Fighter II': Special Champion Edition, yielded sales of 1.665 million cartridges. This version was below Capcom's sales expectations, due in part to competition from the original Mortal Kombat (1992). This version was nevertheless a best-seller in Japan, the UK, and US.

The Mega Drive version, Special Champion Edition, received positive reviews. In November 1993, Famitsu magazine's Reader Cross Review gave II' Plus a 10 out of 10. It received 10 out of 10 for both graphics and addiction from Mega, who described it as "a candidate for best game ever and without a doubt the best beat-'em-up of all time" and gave it an overall 92% score. MegaTech scored it 95%, and commented "the greatest coin-op hits the Megadrive in perfect form". Edge gave the PC Engine version of Champion Edition a score of 8 out of 10.
