= Street Fighter Collection =

1997 video game compilation

- Developer: Capcom
- Publishers: JP/NA: Capcom; PAL: Virgin Interactive Entertainment
- Series: Street Fighter
- Platforms: Sega Saturn, PlayStation
- Release: Saturn: JP: September 18, 1997; NA: December 16, 1997; EU: March 1998; PlayStation: JP: October 23, 1997; NA: December 16, 1997; EU: March 1998
- Genre: Fighting
- Modes: Single-player, multiplayer

Street Fighter Collection is a 1997 fighting game compilation developed and published by Capcom for the Sega Saturn and PlayStation. It contains the original Super Street Fighter II: The New Challengers (1993), its follow-up Super Street Fighter II Turbo (1994), and an enhanced version of Street Fighter Alpha 2 titled Street Fighter Alpha 2 Gold (Street Fighter Zero 2 Dash in Japan and Street Fighter Alpha 2 Dash in Europe), which is exclusive to this compilation.

A follow-up, Street Fighter Collection 2, which contains the first 3 editions of Street Fighter II, was released as part of the Capcom Generations line.

== Gameplay ==
The Super Street Fighter II games are ported from their original CPS II arcade versions. After selecting either game from the Street Fighter Collection title screen on the first disc, the player is taken to the attract mode from the game they have selected. Both games feature the standard "Arcade", "Versus" and "Option" modes. In Super Turbo, the Super Street Fighter II versions of the returning characters, as well as the hidden character Akuma, are playable through easier means compared to the ones provided in the original arcade version. The international versions of Super Turbo have an easier AI than the arcade version; they may be based on the original Japanese version (Super Street Fighter II X) which contained a similarly easier level of difficulty.

Street Fighter Alpha 2 Gold is based on Street Fighter Zero 2 Alpha, an enhanced version of the original Street Fighter Alpha 2 released for the arcade in Japan, Asia and South America. All the game modes and features in the previous PlayStation and Sega Saturn versions of the original Alpha 2 are featured, with the exception of the exclusive "Gallery" mode in the Sega Saturn version. Evil Ryu, who was selectable in the Sega Saturn version of the original Alpha 2 but not in the PlayStation version, is featured in both versions of the game, along with Champion Edition-style renditions of all the Street Fighter II characters featured in the game. This version includes the debut of Super Street Fighter II character Cammy in the Alpha series. She is selectable as a hidden character in the game's "Versus" and "Training" modes. This version of Cammy is the same one previously featured in X-Men vs. Street Fighter, which depicts Cammy as a Shadaloo agent working for M. Bison before joining Delta Red.

== Reception ==
Reception

Aggregate score
Aggregator	Score
GameRankings	73% (PS1)

Review scores
Publication	Score
Electronic Gaming Monthly	8.6/10 (SAT); 8.5/10 (PS1)
GameSpot	5.7/10 (SAT); 5.6/10 (PS1)
Sega Saturn Magazine	95% (SAT)

Reviews were complimentary toward Street Fighter Collection's arcade-perfect conversions, but judged the selection of games too weak to be worth buying. In particular, critics were puzzled that Capcom chose to include Super Street Fighter II, widely regarded as one of the weakest in the series, over more beloved Street Fighter games, and found Street Fighter Alpha 2 Gold too similar to the original Alpha 2, which most of the compilation's prospective audience would already own, since critically acclaimed conversions of Alpha 2 had already been released for both the Saturn and the PlayStation. The inclusion of Super Street Fighter II Turbo was met with widespread approval, but considered insufficient reason to buy the collection on its own. Sega Saturn Magazine's editor-in-chief Rich Leadbetter concluded that, "Is the game worth buying if you already own Street Fighter Alpha 2 (and you should be ashamed of yourself if you don't)? Well, to be brutally honest, I would have to say 'no'. Super Street Fighter 2 Turbo is a cool game, but it is old and it isn't really worth the full whack." Jeff Gerstmann of GameSpot additionally felt that Street Fighter Collection should have included the entire series, remarking "Capcom truly missed out on a great opportunity by releasing a 'collection' that is obscenely incomplete."

GamePro offered a somewhat different viewpoint, opining that Alpha 2 Gold is a worthwhile game but the other two are outdated and have no value beyond nostalgia. While most critics did not compare versions, Kelly Rickards of Electronic Gaming Monthly (EGM) scored the Saturn version half a point higher because he felt the Saturn controller much better suited to fighting games, and his co-reviewer Sushi-X, while giving the two versions equal scores, said the PlayStation version is slightly better due to the Saturn version having some visual glitches.

Despite the criticisms expressed in their reviews for the compilation, Street Fight Collection was a hit at EGM's 1997 Editors' Choice Awards, taking "Fighting Game of the Year" and "Best Compilation", as well as a runner-up for "Saturn Game of the Year" (behind Saturn Bomberman). In naming it "Fighting Game of the Year" the editors explained that, in spite of the advances fighting games had made in both graphics and realism, they still felt the classic Street Fighter games were the best of the genre.
