= Long Vo =

American cartoonist

- Other names: VO, Vostalgic
- Occupations: Entrepreneur, Creative Director and Producer
- Known for: Gaia Online, Street Fighter, Hiptic Games, Go Ninja, ShaqDown

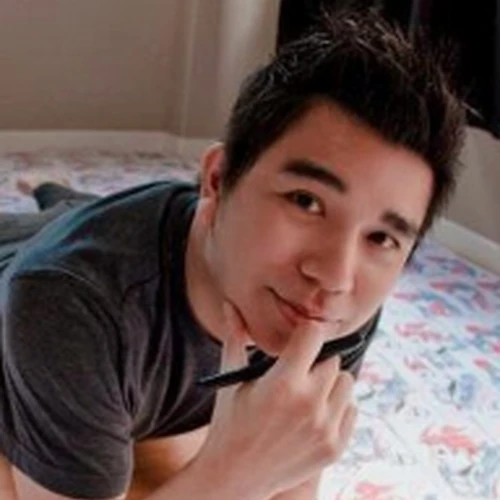

Long Vo (also known online as VO or Vostalgic) is an entrepreneur, freelance illustrator, producer and creative/art director.

Long is one of the three original founders of Gaia Online, one of the first social gaming success stories being an English-language, anime-themed social networking and forums-based gaming website that grew to over 26 million registered users with 7 million unique users each month and was backed by venture firms such as Benchmark, Redpoint, DAG and Time Warner. Prior to this, Long managed comic studio Studio XD and produced illustrations, multimedia and comic books for Marvel Comics, DC Comics, Wildstorm, Image Comics, UDON and many other publishers.

Long's work was first noticed in PSM and GamePro magazine back in 1997 and since then his work has appeared in many other mediums from comics and kids books to internet websites and videogames. Long was listed as associate producer on an independent film All About Dad in 2009.

Long was the lead sprite designer for Super Street Fighter II Turbo HD Remix, a high definition remake of Super Street Fighter 2 Turbo that was released on Xbox Live Arcade and PlayStation Network in November 2008. He provided artwork for the limited collector's edition of Street Fighter IV released in 2009 and was the lead ending artist on Tatsunoko vs. Capcom: Ultimate All-Stars for the Nintendo Wii. He would continue working with Capcom as the Lead Ending Illustrator for Street Fighter V: Arcade Edition. He currently contributes cover illustrations for UDON's Street Fighter 6 comic book series.

Long is founder and creative director of Hiptic Games, a mobile games studio based in the Bay Area. Hiptic Games is the maker of the mobile game app GO NINJA and SHAQDOWN starring Shaquille O'Neal, both games featured in iTunes, as well as Bravoman: Binja Bash!, a spiritual successor of the Bravoman for Namco Bandai under their Shifty Look banner. Their latest release is titled DiverDogs which debuted in July 2014 and was featured under Best New Games the week after. He still continues to do work for UDON and Capcom while creating new original IP and games for Hiptic Games.

Long is currently CoFounder and COO at his startup OneSignal, the leading provider for Web Push and Mobile Push Notifications for Websites and Apps. He also continues to contribute to the fighting game community through his design work for Capcom, Razer Inc., Red Bull, Nsurgo, UDON Entertainment and UDON Collectibles working on properties like Street Fighter V, Marvel vs. Capcom Infinite and Robotech. He is also the designer for Daigo Umehara's "BEAST" brand.

== Works ==
Comic books:

- Tekken Series Cover Art (1998)
- ECHO Series (1999–2000)
- The Nine Rings of Wu-tang Series (2000) (Unpublished Work)
- Last Shot:First Draw (2000)
  - Last Shot Series (2000–2001)
- X-Men Evolution Series (2001–2002)
- Robotech Series (2002–2003)
- Thundercats: Heroes and Villains Miniseries (2003)
- Street Fighter Comic series (2004)
- ROBOT Japanese Doujinshi (2010)
- Super Street Fighter Volume 1 Graphic Novel (2012)

Video games:

- RexBlade (Simon & Schuster, 1996)
- Robotech: Battlecry (Vicious Cycle Software, 2003)
- Capcom Fighting Jam (Capcom, 2004)
- Super Street Fighter II Turbo HD Remix (Capcom, Backbone Entertainment, 2008)
- Street Fighter IV Limited Collector's Edition (Capcom, 2009)
- Super Street Fighter IV (Capcom, 2010)
- Tatsunoko vs. Capcom: Ultimate All-Stars (Capcom, 2010)
- Final Fight: Double Impact (Capcom, 2010)
- GO Ninja! (Hiptic Games, 2012)
- ShaqDown (One Spear Entertainment/Hiptic Games, 2013)
- Fat Squirrel (Hiptic Games, 2013)
- Bravoman: Binja Bash! (Namco Bandai Games/Hiptic Games, 2013)
- DiverDogs (Hiptic Games, 2014)
- Ultra Street Fighter II: The Final Challengers (Capcom, 2017)
- Fantasy Strike (Sirlin Games, 2017)
- Street Fighter V Arcade Edition (Capcom, 2018)

Movies:

- Robotech: The Shadow Chronicles (Harmony Gold, 2007)
- All About Dad (Spartan Film Studios, 2008)
- Inception (Warner Brothers, 2010)
- Mannequin - Short Film (Grilled Cheese Productions, 2025)

Board games:

- Puzzle Strike (Sirlin Games, 2010)
- Yomi (Sirlin Games, 2011)
- Street Fighter Monopoly (game) (Hasbro, 2012)
