= Ultra Street Fighter II =

2017 video game

Ultra Street Fighter II: The Final Challengers
- Packaging artwork
- Developer: Capcom
- Publisher: Capcom
- Director: Toshiyuki Yamamoto
- Producer: Yoshinori Ono
- Artists: Miwako Iwasa; Miki Kitayama; Yasuto Takahashi; UDON Entertainment
- Composers: Satoshi Hori; Marika Suzuki; Reo Uratani
- Series: Street Fighter
- Engine: MT Framework
- Platform: Nintendo Switch
- Release: May 26, 2017
- Genre: Fighting
- Modes: Single-player, multiplayer

Ultra Street Fighter II: The Final Challengers is a 2017 fighting game developed and published by Capcom for the Nintendo Switch. Released to celebrate the Street Fighter series' 30th anniversary, it is an updated version of Super Street Fighter II Turbo (1994), itself an update of Street Fighter II (1991), being the eighth definitive version of the game. The game features two graphical styles: classic pixel art and updated high-definition art. New gameplay mechanics and modes were also introduced, with minor changes being made to the game's balance. The game garnered mixed-to-positive reviews from critics, who praised its updated visuals, but criticized its price, the Way of the Hado mode, and control problems with the Switch's included Joy-Con controllers.

== Gameplay ==
A battle in USFII showing Evil Ryu against Violent Ken in the Suzaku Castle stage. Both characters are new to the Street Fighter II roster. The game can be played in the Classic art style (top) and the New Generation/HD art style (bottom).

Ultra Street Fighter II: The Final Challengers is an updated version of the 1991 fighting game Street Fighter II: The World Warrior. Gameplay is based on the Super Street Fighter II Turbo iteration of Street Fighter II, however Ultra Street Fighter II introduces new mechanics like grapple breaks and re-tunes some aspects of game balance. Combo timing has also been adjusted from the original games.

The intro for the game is based on that of Super Street Fighter II, but is now intercut with excerpts of gameplay, and brief glimpses of Evil Ryu towards the end.

The game is playable in two styles on both graphic and sound settings: the "Classic" graphic mode featuring pixel art graphics of the original game which is played in 4:3 aspect ratio, with the "New Generation" graphic mode featuring the updated high definition graphics of 2008's Super Street Fighter II Turbo HD Remix, provided by UDON Entertainment, and is played in 16:9 widescreen. In the classic sound style, the game uses the original arcade soundtrack and voice-acting, while in the updated new generation sound style uses newly remixed music and the characters' Japanese voices from the Street Fighter IV series. The game supports all control options on the Nintendo Switch console, including play with a single Joy-Con controller.

Ultra Street Fighter II has a standard roster of nineteen characters, plus one hidden character. In addition to all seventeen fighters from Super Turbo, two characters–Evil Ryu and Violent Ken–have been added to the game's roster. Evil Ryu first appeared in the series in 1996's Street Fighter Alpha 2. He is a version of Street Fighter protagonist Ryu that has succumbed to the evil power Satsui no Hado. Violent Ken makes his official debut in a Street Fighter game, having previously only appeared in the crossover fighting game SNK vs. Capcom: SVC Chaos. He is a version of Ken Masters that has been brainwashed by M. Bison and makes use of Bison's Psycho Powers. As Akuma becomes a regular selectable fighter, his Shin Akuma form, a secret boss from Street Fighter Alpha 2, is also featured as a secret character only selectable in local play through the input of a code on the character select screen.

List of characters
Character	Country of origin
Akuma	Japan
Balrog	United States
Blanka	Brazil
Cammy	England
Chun-Li	China
Dee Jay	Jamaica
Dhalsim	India
E. Honda	Japan
Evil Ryu	Japan
Fei Long	Hong Kong
Guile	United States
Ken	United States
M. Bison	Thailand
Ryu	Japan
Sagat	Thailand
Shin Akuma	Japan
T. Hawk	Mexico
Vega	Spain
Violent Ken	United States
Zangief	Soviet Union

The game features local and online multiplayer. Online multiplayer includes a point-based ranking system based on a player's wins and losses. A "standby" feature has been added to the game's arcade mode, which allows other online players to challenge and take the place of the CPU opponent that the player typically battles in arcade. A local cooperative game mode, known in the Alpha games as "Dramatic Battle", has been added in Ultra Street Fighter II now known as "Buddy Battle". It allows players to team up in a two versus one fight against a CPU player. Additionally the game includes a simplified one-hit knockout mode.

In addition to the standard 2D gameplay, the game also includes an exclusive new Street Fighter V/Street Fighter IV-styled first-person battle mode known as "Way Of the Hado". In this mode, the player controls Ryu in a first-person perspective to defeat as many Shadaloo Soldiers as possible, while M. Bison also appears as a boss. For this mode, the player must hold the Joy-Con controller in both hands to perform attacks such as Hadouken, Shoryuken and Tatsumaki Senpukyaku in order to defeat enemies. As the player progresses throughout the game, the player can earn growth points to power up Ryu. The mode has three difficulties: Beginner, Standard and Extra. There is also a practice mode for practicing attacks, as well as an Endless mode that lets the player fight until Ryu's health bar is empty.

USFII includes a gallery mode, containing over 1400 illustrations from the art book SF20: The Art of Street Fighter. The player can also listen to each fighter's modern or classic-styled stage music while in gallery mode.

In the Color Edit mode, the player can make their own alternate palettes for each of the 19 fighters, then use them in Arcade Mode, VS Mode and Online Battles, allowing for the storage of up to 10 custom palettes for each character.

== Development and release ==
Ultra Street Fighter II: The Final Challengers was developed by Japanese video game company Capcom. The development team was composed of a mixture of old and young employees, some of whom worked on recent Capcom fighting games like Street Fighter V and Marvel vs. Capcom: Infinite. On February 14, 2017, development of the game was 50% complete.

The game was announced for the Nintendo Switch console in January 2017. The announcement marked the beginning of Street Fighter's 30th anniversary celebration. With the last Street Fighter title to release on a Nintendo system being 2011's Super Street Fighter IV: 3D Edition for the Nintendo 3DS, Capcom saw the launch of the Nintendo Switch as an opportunity to bring a brand-new remixed version of a classic Street Fighter game to a Nintendo console. There are currently no plans to release the game on other consoles.

On the decision to revisit Street Fighter II, series producer Yoshinori Ono noted that they wanted to go back to their roots. Capcom chose to include two graphical styles so that the game would give old players a sense of nostalgia but still appeal to a younger audience with the updated art. The game's high-definition graphics were produced by UDON Entertainment. The development team did not want to overhaul the game's balance as they want the game to feel like a fighting game from the 1990s. However, they felt that some questionable aspects of the game's balance should be re-tuned.

Ultra Street Fighter II: The Final Challengers was released on May 26, 2017.

== Reception ==
Reception

Aggregate score
Aggregator	Score
Metacritic	66/100

Review scores
Publication	Score
Destructoid	7/10
Electronic Gaming Monthly	65%
Game Informer	7/10
GameRevolution	3/5
IGN	75%
Nintendo Life	6/10
Polygon	6/10

Ultra Street Fighter II: The Final Challengers received a mixed reception, according to review aggregator Metacritic. Though the updated graphics were praised, the game was criticized for charging a US$40 retail release for what is essentially an updated port of the much cheaper Super Street Fighter II Turbo HD Remix. The "Way of the Hado" mode was also criticized for poorly implemented motion controls that are prone to confusing attack inputs for other attacks, as well as being shallow in content. The game's functionality of the Joy-Con controllers was also criticized with critics pointing out issues with the Joy-Con's D-Pad and analog stick controls and suggested players pay an extra $70 to get a Pro Controller. IGN concluded "Despite being the most complete version of Street Fighter II to date, the specific additions for the occasion just do not excite us."

=== Sales ===
The game reached number 8 in the UK sales chart, number 3 in Japan, 2 in Australia and 3 in New Zealand and number 3 in Switzerland. In the USA eShop the game was number 2 behind Minecraft. In August 2017, The Wall Street Journal's Takashi Mochizuki reported that the game sold over 450,000 copies, selling more than what Capcom expected. Because of this, Capcom has shown more interest in selling more games on the Switch. As of 2018, the game has crossed 500,000 sales.
