= Chess 2: The Sequel =

2014 video game

- The cover art of the official video game adaptation of Chess 2: The Sequel on Steam.
- Genres: Board game Chess variant
- Players: 2
- Setup time: ~1 minute; an additional minute to determine starting position
- Playing time: Casual games: usually 10–60 mins. Tournament games: anywhere from 10 mins. (blitz chess) to 6+ hours
- Chance: Little
- Skills: Strategy, tactics

Chess 2: The Sequel is a chess variant created by David Sirlin and Zachary Burns of Ludeme Games. Sirlin, whose previous design work includes rebalancing Super Street Fighter II Turbo HD Remix, approached what he believed to be a problem of rote endgames and static opening games in chess by introducing asymmetrical piece compositions and an additional win condition. A video game version of Chess 2 is available on Ouya as of 2014. The game was released on Steam on 19 August 2014.

== Design ==
When designing Chess 2, Sirlin took inspiration from Bobby Fischer's Chess960 variant. Like Fischer, his goals were to create a more dynamic opening game, decrease the emphasis on openings memorization, and reduce draws. In Chess 2, players may choose from six unique armies, such as an army with two kings and an army whose knights, bishops, and rooks may move like each other when adjacent.

A new win condition has been added: a player wins if their king travels past the 4th rank. This was intended to prevent traditional "solved" chess endgames, which can be played by consulting a chess tablebase, and therefore does not require player skill.

A third rule change from standard chess is the dueling system. Each player begins the game with three stones. Whenever a capture is made, the defending player may initiate a "duel." In a duel, the players secretly "bid" up to two stones. After revealing the bids, the stones are removed from the game; if the defender spent more stones than the attacker, both the attacking and defending pieces are captured. More stones may be earned by capturing enemy pawns. Sirlin's intention with this mechanic was to allow players to dynamically evaluate the worth of their pieces throughout the match.

== Armies ==
There are six armies players may choose from at the start of a game. All armies have the standard setup for chess as their baseline, except they are unable to castle (except for the Classic army).

=== Classic ===
The Classic army is simply the standard chess setup. It is the only army that is allowed to castle.

=== Nemesis ===
The Nemesis army has their queen replaced with the namesake Nemesis, and their pawns replaced with nemesis pawns.

- The nemesis moves as a queen but it cannot capture pieces or be captured by other pieces other than the opposing king(s). It can still give check and checkmate to a king.
- Nemesis pawns are unable to move two spaces on their first move, but have the option of making a nemesis move. A nemesis move is a non-capturing move one square towards the enemy king. If the opponent is playing with the Two Kings army, then the move may be done towards either of their kings.

Position: d6 black king, e4 up-left arrow, f4 up arrow, e3 left arrow, f3 white pawn

A nemesis pawn doing a nemesis move.

=== Empowered ===
While a knight, bishop or rook of the Empowered army is orthogonally adjacent to another knight, bishop or rook of the same color, each of those piece gains the power of its neighbour in addition to its regular movement. However, the queen is replaced by an elegant queen, which may only move as a king.

=== Reaper ===
The Reaper army has their queen replaced by the namesake Reaper, and their rooks by ghosts.

- The Reaper may move to any unoccupied square of the board or capture any enemy piece, except for the opponent's first rank. It is also unable to capture a king and thus does not give check or checkmate.
- The ghosts may move to any unoccupied square of the board and cannot be captured, but they are unable to capture any piece.

=== Two Kings ===
The Two Kings army replaces both their normal king and their queen by two warrior kings. The game is lost if either is checkmated, and to win by midline invasion both kings must cross the midline.

Warrior kings move as a king but may also perform a whirlwind attack, which captures all adjacent units, friendly or enemy, without moving the king. This may not be performed if the other warrior king would be captured by it, or if the resulting position would put one of the kings in check.

Additionally, after each of their turns the Two Kings army may optionally perform a special king-turn where the only actions are either moving a warrior king or performing a whirlwind attack. No king may be moved into check during either the normal turn or the optional king-turn. If any of the kings is in check, it must be out of check at the end of the normal turn.

=== Animals ===
The Animals have their pieces replaced in the following way:

- Knights are replaced with wild horses, which may capture friendly pieces.
- Bishops are replaced with tigers, which can only move up to two squares at once, but after capturing immediately jumps back to the square it attacked from.
- Rooks are replaced with elephants, which can only move up to three squares at once, may capture friendly pieces and cannot be captured by pieces more than two squares away (must be in a 5x5 square centered on the elephant). In addition, whenever the elephant captures a piece, it rampages and must move the full three squares in that direction, capturing every piece, friendly or enemy, on its path.
- The queen is replaced with the jungle queen, which may move either as a rook or as a knight, similarly to the empress, chancellor or reaper.

== Release ==
A video game version of Chess 2 was released on Ouya in December 2013. The game debuted on Valve's digital distribution platform Steam in 2014. In June 2014 the game's servers were temporarily shut down after an ex parte court order issued to Microsoft to seize the domains of DNS service No-IP in order to control botnets that had abused its services. The game received "mixed or average" reviews according to Metacritic.
