= David Sirlin =

American writer and game designer

- Education: Massachusetts Institute of Technology
- Occupation: Writer/Game Designer
- Writing career
- Genres: Video games Game design
- Website: sirlin.net

David Sirlin is an American game designer and fighting game player.

He featured in and narrated much of Bang the Machine, a 2002 documentary by Tamara Katepoo about a Street Fighter "exhibition tournament in Japan showing the difference between American and Japanese gaming cultures" that starred other notable competitive fighting game players who were part of "Team USA."

He balanced the video games Super Puzzle Fighter II Turbo HD Remix and Super Street Fighter II Turbo HD Remix. He designed the physical and online card games Yomi, Flash Duel, Codex, and Puzzle Strike.

Early in his career, Sirlin was an assistant game designer at 3DO, but now works primarily for his own company, Sirlin Games. Sirlin has been described as a "renowned game theory author" by Forbes magazine, and as an "arcade guru" and "internet-renowned Street Fighter tournament player" by Ars Technica.

== Writing ==
Sirlin maintains a blog where he writes primarily on the subject of game design. A frequent contributor to Gamasutra, he is relatively infamous for his sometimes unpopular opinions towards the way companies choose to enforce rules in their games, as well as for his articles on Playing to Win. Sirlin's website, Sirlin.net, was profiled in Katie Salen's Rules of Play (2004), which commended the site for its "surprising amount of thoughtful commentary and analysis".

In addition to this, he has published a book called Playing to Win: Becoming The Champion, a book that explores the concept of competitive gaming and the mindset of actively playing to win, also drawing examples from the different kinds of gamers that exist by selectively choosing and analyzing both chess and Street Fighter players. Physical copies of this book were initially available from Lulu.com before the book was released for free to the general public on his website. The book was cited by scholar David Myers in his paper "Self and selfishness in online social play".

Sirlin has become critical of many mainstream competitive games for what he perceives to be manipulative business practices and other 'anti-competitive' elements. He has particularly condemned collectible card games such as Magic: The Gathering for hiding strategically critical components behind the random distribution of booster packs and popular multiplayer online battle arena (MOBA) game League of Legends for its "forced grinding," calling it "fraudulent" and disrespectful to players.

== Career ==
=== Backbone ===
While employed at Backbone Entertainment, Sirlin was lead designer behind Super Street Fighter II Turbo HD Remix, a remake of Super Street Fighter II Turbo. He was also in deliberation with Capcom in an attempt to acquire permission to use the Street Fighter characters in addition to original characters from his Fantasy Strike universe for his current project, Yomi, but was not granted it.

During development of Super Street Fighter II HD Remix, many interviews as well as a number of blog posts on Capcom Unity chronicle Sirlin's involvement in both the game's development as well the major design choices and changes made to the game itself.

=== Kongregate ===
Sirlin designed the online card game Kongai for the gaming website, Kongregate.

=== Sirlin Games ===
More recently Sirlin has been involved in the design and production of his own games—particularly, a range of tabletop games, most taking place in and featuring characters from the Fantasy Strike fictional universe he created. Two of these games (Yomi and Flash Duel) attempt to recreate some of the game concepts found in the fighting games he is familiar with. The third game, Puzzle Strike, attempts to recreate the Super Puzzle Fighter II Turbo experience. Another game, Pandante, is similar to Texas holdem poker, and Chess 2 is a redesigned, asymmetric version of Chess.

His most recently published game is Codex, a turn based game with elements from Magic: The Gathering and themes from RTS (real time strategy) games such as StarCraft.

The Magic: The Gathering card "Master of Predicaments" contains the flavor text "Designed by David Sirlin".

In January 2015 Sirlin created a podcast on his Patreon page discussing the possibility of creating a simple, accessible fighting game, and in June 2015, Sirlin announced that he would begin creating a fighting game set in and featuring characters from his Fantasy Strike universe. The resulting Fantasy Strike was released in Early Access on Steam in September 2017.

== Speaking engagements ==
=== Game Developers Conference (2009,2017) ===
In 2009, Sirlin was one of the speakers at the Game Developers Conference, the largest annual gathering of professional video game developers. His one-hour lecture was about balancing multiplayer competitive games. In 2017, Sirlin gave a design talk discussing Puzzle Strike specifically.

=== Montreal International Game Summit ===
In 2009, Sirlin spoke at the Montreal International Game Summit about the subject of omitting unnecessary clicks from games. The talk was entitled Every Click Counts.

== Personal life ==
Sirlin grew up in Sacramento, California and graduated from Rio Americano High School. He is the son of Ted (1923-2009) and Thela Sirlin. His father was a photographer and owner of Sirlin Photography Studios for over 40 years. David Sirlin currently lives in Emeryville, California. He has obtained degrees in mathematics and business from the Massachusetts Institute of Technology and MIT Sloan School of Management.

Sirlin married Lina Jemili in 2023.

== See also ==
- Capcom Classics Collection
- Super Puzzle Fighter II Turbo HD Remix
- Super Street Fighter II Turbo HD Remix
- Yomi (card game)
- Fantasy Strike
