= Yomi (card game) =

2011 fighting card game

Yomi: Fighting Card Game
- Designers: David Sirlin
- Publishers: Sirlin Games
- Players: 2 (with game modes that support up to 6 players)
- Playing time: ~30 minutes
- Chance: Medium
- Age range: 10 and up
- Skills: Hand management, valuation, reading one's opponent

Yomi: Fighting Card Game (often shortened to Yomi) is a card game created by David Sirlin, inspired by Super Street Fighter II Turbo, which Sirlin also worked on. "Yomi" is Japanese for "reading", as in reading the mind of the opponent. The Yomi card game is designed to distill the high-level mind games from fighting game into a simple card game. It features asymmetric gameplay, and makes use of cards with multiple options.

== Products within the series ==
There are two products within the Yomi series:

- The base set (featuring 10 characters)
- The Shadows Expansion (featuring another 10 characters)

Additionally, there are special versions of those cards, such as the EX character cards, and special edition decks, such as the G. Panda deck.

=== Editions ===
Yomi, including the base set and Shadows Expansion, has been through many iterations throughout its lifetime, and is currently in its second edition.

The first edition of Yomi was made available in 2011.

Yomi second edition, an update of the first edition, features:

- Several new game modes (including a 2 vs 2 and 3 vs 3 team battle, a solo mode against an automated opponent, and a 2 vs 1 mode)
- Small changes to character cards and some game mechanics

The second edition was first made available for purchase via a Kickstarter campaign ahead of retail sale.

=== Online version ===
In addition to being playable with physical cards, Yomi can be played online against human opponents or the "yomibot" AI via an iOS app, or on Steam.

== Reception ==
Jamie Salmon writing for the Nottingham Evening Post likens a turn of Yomi to a game of rock paper scissors including aspects of "second-guessing mind games".

Matt Thrower of Pocket Gamer called the mobile game "a world first in genre blending". He also noted the complexity of the game.

Kelsey Rinella of Pocket Tactics noted that the breadth of characters meant the game could take a long time to master, but allowed players to choose how they approached the game, also noting it felt more like playing a fighting game than expected.

Chris Carter of TouchArcade wrote: "Sirlin Games has done a great job of making sure everything’s balanced, and just playing from the base game is plenty competitive."

== Setting ==
Yomi is set within and features characters from the Fantasy Strike universe created by David Sirlin.

== Gameplay ==
The objective of Yomi is similar to that of competitive fighting games like Super Street Fighter II Turbo. The first player to bring their opponent to 0 hp wins.

There are 5 types of cards available:

- Attacks - Beat throws and slower attacks. Loses to blocks and dodges.
- Throws - Beat blocks and dodges, often causing a knockdown. Loses to attacks.
- Blocks - Beat attacks and draw a card. Loses to throws and cross up attacks.
- Dodges - Beat attacks and allow for a counterattack. Loses to throws.
- Jokers - Beat attacks and throws. Loses to blocks and dodges.

=== Turn Sequence ===
Play is simultaneous for both players.

1. Draw Phase (skip on first turn)
  - Draw a card
2. Combat Phase
  - Play a face-down card
  - Reveal combat cards simultaneously
  - Determine combat winner
  - Loser can play face-down Joker to avoid more damage, or a bluff card, or discard their combat card to signify they're skipping this step
  - Winner plays combos if applicable
  - Reveal and discard Joker/bluff card
  - Discard remaining combat cards at end of combat
3. Power Up Phase
  - Discard pairs, 3-of-a-kinds, or 4-of-a-kinds to search for Aces.
  - Search for more Aces if you hit with a chain combo this turn.

== Awards and honors ==
- 2010 - Tom Vasel's Game of the Year
- 2011 - #12 on Tom Vasel's top 100 games of all time (2011 edition)
- 2012 - Bestcovery Best Card Game award
