= Gaia Online =

Anime-centered social media and forum website

Gaia Interactive, Inc.
- Type: Private
- Industry: Internet; Social networking
- Founded: February 18, 2003; 23 years ago
- Founders: Derek Liu; Long Vo; Josh Gainsbrugh
- Headquarters: San Jose, California, U.S.
- Key people: James Cao (CEO); Derek Liu (CTO)
- Number of employees: 25
- Website: www.gaiaonline.com

Gaia Online is an English-language anime-themed social networking and forums-based website with Chibi-style animations. It was founded as go-gaia on February 18, 2003, by Derek Liu, Long Vo, Josh Gainsbrugh, and the name was changed to GaiaOnline.com in 2004 by its owner, Gaia Interactive. Gaia originally began as an anime linklist and eventually developed a small community, but following a statement by founder Derek Liu, the website moved towards social gaming and eventually became forum-based.

In 2007, over a million posts were made daily, and 7 million unique users visited each month (with over 26 million total registered users). Gaia also won the 2007 Webware 100 award in the Community category and was included in Time magazine's list of 50 best websites in 2008. In January 2011, the company won the Mashable Best User experience Award for 2010.

== Avatars ==
Members of Gaia Online, known as Gaians, receive a customizable avatar when they sign up. Users have the ability to customize their avatar in many ways, including skin tone, eye style and color, hairstyle and color, gender, race (e.g. human, vampire, elf, zombies), and attire. Numerous clothing items and accessories for avatars can be purchased from a range of NPC-run stores using the site currencies, Gaia Platinum and Gaia Cash. Players may also gift one another clothing items and accessories. Avatars appear next to posts in the forums and profile comments (the post itself encapsulated in a "speech bubble"), and in Gaia Towns and Gaia rallies, and other environments the avatar appears as a movable character that can travel from place to place, interacting with the environment (catching bugs, shaking trees, digging for buried treasure, collecting trash and flowers, etc.) and other users. In February 2018, an avatar based on Doki Doki Literature Club! (DDLC!) main antagonist Monika was released to Gaia Online under the title "Just Dangerous Me", the addition of which has been criticised by DDLC! creator Dan Salvato as Gaia did not seek permission and sold the skin as a microtransaction without compensation to Team Salvato.

== Forums ==
There is a large variety of forums in which users can post in and communicate with one another. These forums are used for general discussion, news, Admin announcements, role-play, general entertainment, and artist discussions.

== Economy ==
=== Currency ===
The currency used in Gaia is known as "Gaia Platinum" (formerly, "Gaia Gold"). Platinum is regularly distributed to users as they browse around the website, post in the forums, play games, and participate in other various events and contests; the site also rewards users every day with random platinum or items from the Daily Chance. The former virtual currency was known as Gaia Gold, however, after a rapid increase in inflation after gold generating items were released, Gaia created Gaia Platinum and gave users the chance to switch to that currency.

In July 2007, Gaia released another virtual currency called "Gaia Cash", which can be purchased with real money. Gaia Cash can be bought through cell phone payments, or directly from Gaia itself.

=== AutoCash ===
On September 13, 2010, Gaia announced the introduction of AutoCash. AutoCash is an optional feature where GaiaOnline members can sign up to buy Gaia Cash on a reoccurring monthly schedule. The current cost per month for the feature is $10; users are given extra content for the monthly fee. Staying past three months offers users the bonus of receiving special items.

=== Market ===
Sales within the Gaian market can be divided into four areas: Gold Shops, Cash Shops, Trade, and Marketplace.

- Gold Shops: Items from these stores can be bought with Gold or Gaia Cash (most users purchase with Gold), and can range from regular store items to upmarket items. These are various NPC-run stores that sell a variety of items, such as avatar clothing and accessories, furniture for Gaia Houses, and parts for Gaia Cars. Items found in the shops can also be sold back to the shop for 50% of the shop price.
- Cash Shops: Items from these stores can be purchased with Gaia Cash only. The majority of Gaia Cash sales are from La Victoire, an NPC-run store that only accepts Gaia Cash. It specializes in high-end items such as "Evolving Items", "Random Item Generators", and "Monthly Collectibles". Most items from La Victoire are continuously rotated in and out of the store. Other Cash-Only stores include "Phin Phang" (Gaia Aquarium items), and "Back Alley Bargains" (power-up items for Gaia's MMORPG, "zOMG!").
- Trade: Users can trade items and gold with other users. A majority of these trades are settled in the "Gaia Exchange" forum (and its sub-forums).
- Marketplace: The Marketplace is a separate area of the site for users to buy and sell items. Rather than self-auctioning an item through a thread in the Exchange forum, users can either put their item up for immediate sale with a "Buy Now" price, or leave their item for auction with a starting "Bid" price. Users can have up to 10 items for sale at once until getting the Tycoon achievement. After that, users can sell 20 items at once, and each item can be listed for a maximum of 14 days. The cost of this convenience is a 5% tax on all gold earned from sales.

The site's virtual economy experienced hyperinflation after the introduction of more gold into circulation, partly due to the introduction of purchasable 'gold generators' which generated daily gold automatically. These were introduced by the site's then-owners in an attempt to boost the site's short-term revenue. To maintain that revenue, new and bigger gold-generators were frequently introduced and an arms-race ensued between site users. This would eventually lead to the collapse of the economy, coupled with large declines in the userbase, and the ultimate sale of the site. Later owners substituted a replacement currency, Platinum, currently pegged at 1 Platinum to 10 million of the old Gold currency, and have not returned to currency generators as a way to raise revenue. However, former COO Jason Loia has stated he didn't consider inflation as a significant issue.

=== Notable items ===
==== Monthly Collectibles ====
Monthly Collectibles (previously known as Donation Items, also referred on site as MCs) are special items that can be bought with real money meant to support Gaia's maintenance and costs. Established in June 2003 after users of Gaia Online petitioned for a "donation system" in an attempt to increase site revenue, for every US$2.50 a user gives to the site, he or she receives an item known as a "Sealed Envelope" in his or her inventory.

Sealed Envelopes go on sale on the first day of every month and are released on the 15th of each month on. During August and September 2008, the envelopes were unsealed on the eighth, but on October 2, 2008, it was decided that the release date should be returned to the fifteenth. The Sealed Envelope disappears from the user's inventory and is replaced by a "Thank You Letter" for the current paid month (for example, a "Thank You Letter for August 2004" represents a payment made in that month of that year). Users are then able to open these virtual letters to choose one of two or three limited-edition items to be granted into their inventory from each letter. These items were known as Donation Items until potential legal problems prompted the name change. Monthly Collectible items and the "Thank You" letter items they are found in are specific to the month that they were released in: for example, the items found in the "Thank You" letter for April 2006 can only be found in that letter, and one could only purchase that letter in April 2006.

Letters can be purchased over the phone, with a text message from a mobile phone, via PayPal, credit card, traditional mail or with Gaia Cash through the Cash Shop, "La Victoire". Envelopes and letters can be later bought and sold through user trades or through Marketplace. The production of these types of items were discontinued, with the final Monthly Collectibles released on March 15, 2017.

==== Evolving Items ====
Evolving Items, commonly abbreviated to EIs, are items that change or evolve over time. Items begin with one set of item poses, but with each new evolution, a different set of poses become available instead. Additionally, with each subsequent evolution a re-release of the item becomes available at the Cash Shop as a "next-generation" release. When the item has fully evolved all previous poses become available for the item. Times between evolutions are different for each EI, and can be anywhere between a few weeks to a few months. Recent additions of "Rapid Evolving Items" evolve twice a week. New evolution updates are noted in regular site announcements as "Evolving Item Reports" present by the NPC, Dr. Singh. All EIs are available from the Cash Shop "La Victoire", and can be later sold through trading or in the Marketplace. EIs are removed from the Cash Shop sometime after their final evolution becomes available.

==== Chance Items/Random Item Generators ====
With Chance Items, referred to as CIs (previously known as Random Item Generators, or RIGs), users play a chance mini-game and the item they are granted depends on their success with completing the game when they decide to stop playing and collect an item, or their failure to complete the game. Games will vary depending on the RIG – some may require users to choose a "correct" response, while some are simply a choice between continuing the game or stopping and collecting an item. RIGs are available from the Cash Shop "La Victoire" and are eventually rotated out of the shop.

=== Gaia Houses ===
Users are able to own their own Gaia House situated in Gaia Towns. Houses are available in three different styles: Round, Square, and Long. To purchase a house is free, however future changes to the style of the house cost an additional amount. Users are also able to relocate their homes to a different Town postcode for an additional cost. A range of decorative furniture items can be bought from the NPC-run store, "The Faktori", such as include floor and wall tiles, tables, chairs, lamps, among others. Rare housing items can be found in Enchanted Wooden Trunks and Enchanted Golden Trunks randomly found floating across site pages.

=== Gaia Cars ===
On June 18, 2007, Gaia Online and Scion announced a partnership that allowed users to create a virtual Scion with customizable wheels, decals, fog lights, tail lights, and spoilers. Other car choices available were the fictional Possum and Musculero. The Scion tC, Scion xD, UFO and Kiki Car (which is available only with Cash) were later released, bringing the total to seven possible cars to choose from. Users can own up to 3 cars, which are stored in their Garage. Parts and decals for cars (such as paint color and antenna ornaments), as well as car bases, can be purchased from the NPC-run store, "Sam's Body and Parts". Cars are used as part of the Rally game available on the website.

=== Gaia Aquarium ===
Users can maintain fish and other creatures in Gaia Aquariums. Fish and tank accessories can be purchased with both Gaia Cash and Gold from the NPC-run store, "Phin Phang". At certain times, the fish inside a tank (from a different owner, commonly as a signature under a post in the forums) will "glow", enabling the Booty Grab mini-game. Aquarium item bundles (which include various fish and tank items) can be purchased from the main Cash shop, "La Victoire". Items can also be bought at the marketplace.

=== Arenas ===
There are four main arenas on Gaia Online: Housing, Art, Avatar, and Writing – with some of these arenas having subcategories. Members can vote in the arenas and comment on art, avatars, houses, or written works that have been submitted by other users.

The Avatar Arenas was a popular feature of the site that was first released on January 2, 2006. Each week, Users could spend 100 Gold to enter their current Avatar into Arenas and have fellow users vote for them using a 10-point system. On Sundays at 12:00 A.M. PST, the top ten entries with the highest average score would be rewarded with Gold based on their rankings and had their Avatar permanently featured in the Avatar Arena winner circle that is permanently archived in the Arena features. On September 30, 2008, the Avatar Arenas were separated into two categories. Users could enter Cosplay Avatars in one Arena and Original Avatars which did not qualify as a cosplay in the other. The voting system was changed to a 5-Star score that users could vote with. Entry fees into the Arenas increased after this to reduce the number of entries and currently cost 10,000 gold to enter.

Entering the Art and Housing Arena is free, and no prizes are awarded.

=== Sponsor Quests ===
The Gaia Quest system grants users items for performing certain tasks. Although previously quests for doing tasks around the website (similar to Gaia's current Achievement system), quests on the site are now for promotional purposes, granting items related to a featured movie, video game, or series for watching trailers or advertisements.

Movies, video games, and other products that are promoted by the Gaia Quest system include Gracie, Pirates of the Caribbean: At World's End, The Golden Compass, Nancy Drew, The Last Mimzy, The Spiderwick Chronicles, Kung Fu Panda, Bee Movie, Dynasty Warriors: Strikeforce, You Don't Mess With The Zohan, Paul Blart: Mall Cop, The Sims 3, Sonic and the Black Knight, Harry Potter, PopStar Guitar, and The Sisterhood of the Traveling Pants 2, among many others. Anime series and TV shows have also been promoted, such as Naruto, Tsubasa: Reservoir Chronicle, and The Hills. There are a few for games such as Dragon Quest Swords and Naruto: Ultimate Ninja.

There are also some quests for products such as Crazy Cores Skittles.

=== Achievements ===
Achievements are tasks that can be performed around the site. Completion of Achievements grants users Achievement Points. There are a variety of different Achievements that can be obtained – tasks to gain these can include posting in a thread, changing one's equipped avatar items (or equipping specific items), selling an item in Marketplace, among many others.

Users can use Achievements they earn to add titles under their Avatar.

== Games ==
Gaia Online currently offers a number of games where users can win different items or gold. These games constitute 10% to 15% of total site activity. In December 2020, Gaia removed Flash from their website including games requiring Flash. This was a large portion of their game selection.

=== zOMG ===
zOMG (stylized as zOMG!) is a browser-based MMORPG on Gaia where users battled monsters and participated in RPG-style quests. The game utilized special rings to activate abilities, such as throwing fireballs or conjuring up a defense. Users did not level up the traditional way via experience points, but instead, through collecting Charge Orbs and empowering their rings with them. zOMG was made public and open to beta testing in November 2008, and a number of updates were made to the rings and flow of the game during its six-year duration on the site. On November 6, 2014, the staff announced that due to hardware and engineering limitations, zOMG was to be permanently removed from Gaia Online.

On February 28, 2017, it was announced that beta tests for a zOMG revival were underway.

On March 13, 2017, zOMG returned and is now open to play again. Members who played zOMG before the shutdown of the servers could pick back up where they left off, however, those who sold or discarded their rings and zOMG-related items did not have their items recovered.

=== Smashblox ===
Smashblox is a game that is a part of The Playpen. Players destroy blocks and clear the board to score as many points as possible. Tournaments are held through the game, while Gaia Cash is required to play, and Gaia gold is rewarded as a prize for winning.

Gaia Towns users chatting

=== Gaia Worlds ===
Gaia Towns (often simply called Towns) is a virtual world game where avatars may move and interact with each other. While in Towns users can pick up various items. Insects, litter, and flowers can be collected while in Towns, and these items can be later made into other items for a small cost. Shaking trees, rocks, and shrubs can yield small amounts of gold to be collected. Users may use a virtual chat system while in the towns. Homes can be found throughout Towns and more than one user can visit someone else's home.

Towns 2, was launched in 2013. The regular updating of Towns and Towns 2 was discontinued because of the decrease in active, unique players. Players can still use these Towns and visit their friends. In November 2020, an announcement was made that Gaia will be creating Towns 3 which is an entirely 3D environment. Players should expect the release of a Towns 3 demo once they have completely removed Flash from Gaia Online.

== Virtual worlds ==
=== Sponsored Worlds ===
Since 2009, Gaia has been implementing virtual worlds, similar to Towns, for various site sponsors. These have included a rainbow-styled world for a Skittles sponsor, a castle for an Alice in Wonderland film promotion, a large forest tree for the film Legend of the Guardians, and a tree house for the animated TV series Adventure Time among many others. Users can interact with certain NPCs in these areas, and are often awarded prizes for visiting these areas.

=== App ===
Gaia has also released multiple apps on iOS. Gaia on the Go, the main application allows users a streamlined way of accessing the forums and making minor avatar edits, as well as viewing the site's marketplace. Derek Liu announced that a new version of the application was being worked on. Gaia has also released one of their games, Switchem, and a virtual world, Rallys, as separate iOS applications.

== See also ==
- List of Internet forums
- Catherine Wayne/Boxxy, gained notability when she created videos for her Gaia friends.
