= Street Fighter II =

1991 video game

Street Fighter II: The World Warrior
- Japanese arcade brochure featuring the original eight main characters. Clockwise from top: Zangief, Ken, Blanka, Dhalsim, Ryu, Guile, and E. Honda. Center: Chun-Li.
- Developer: Capcom (Note: Amiga, Atari ST, Commodore 64 and MS-DOS versions developed by Creative Materials; ZX Spectrum version developed by Tiertex; Game Boy version developed by Sun L.)
- Publishers: Capcom: Super NES; JP/NA: Capcom; PAL: Bandai Amiga, Atari ST, C64, CPC, ZX Spectrum U.S. Gold MS-DOS; NA: Hi Tech Expressions; EU: U.S. Gold Game Boy; JP: Capcom; NA/EU: Nintendo
- Director: Akira Nishitani
- Producer: Yoshiki Okamoto
- Designers: Akira Nishitani; Akira Yasuda
- Programmers: Shinichi Ueyama; Seiji Okada; Yoshihiro Matsui; Motohide Eshiro
- Artists: Eri Nakamura; Satoru Yamashita
- Composers: Yoko Shimomura; Isao Abe
- Series: Street Fighter
- Platform: Arcade: Super NES, MS-DOS, Commodore 64, Amiga, ZX Spectrum, Atari ST, CPS Changer, Game Boy, Java ME
- Release: March 7, 1991: Arcade; JP: March 7, 1991 (Note: This was the mass market release date according to Capcom, but there were earlier location tests. Game Machine magazine lists its shipping date as February 1991. The United States Copyright Office lists its publication date as February 14, 1991.); WW: March 1991 Super NES; JP: June 10, 1992; NA: July 15, 1992; AU: October 23, 1992; UK: October 1992; EU: December 17, 1992 Amiga; UK: December 15, 1992 ZX Spectrum; EU: 1993 CPS Changer; JP: July 14, 1994 Game Boy; JP: August 11, 1995; NA: September 1995; EU: 1995
- Genre: Fighting
- Modes: Single-player, multiplayer
- Arcade system: CP System

Street Fighter II: The World Warrior (Note: Japanese: ストリートファイターII -The World Warrior-, Hepburn: Sutorīto Faitā Tsū Za Warudo Uōria) is a 1991 fighting game developed and published by Capcom for arcades. It is the second installment in the Street Fighter series and the sequel to 1987's Street Fighter. Designed by Yoshiki Okamoto and Akira Yasuda, who had previously worked on the game Final Fight, it is the fourteenth game to use Capcom's CP System arcade system board. Street Fighter II vastly improved many of the concepts introduced in the first game, including the use of special command-based moves, a combo system, a six-button configuration, and a wider selection of playable characters, each with a unique fighting style.

Street Fighter II became the best-selling game since the golden age of arcade video games. By 1994, it had been played by an estimated 25 million people in the United States alone. More than 200,000 arcade cabinets and 15 million software units of every version of Street Fighter II have been sold worldwide, earning an estimated $10 billion in revenue, making it one of the top three highest-grossing video games of all time as of 2017 and the best-selling fighting game until 2019; estimated to be approximately £260(~$350) million in arcades in the UK alone. More than 6.3 million SNES cartridges of Street Fighter II were sold, making it Capcom's best-selling single software game for the next 20 years, its best-selling game on a single platform, and the highest-selling third-party game on the SNES.

Unlike its predecessor, Street Fighter II became a pop culture phenomenon, and is frequently regarded as one of the greatest video games ever made. It is also cited as the most important and influential fighting game ever, with its launch being credited to popularizing the genre during the 1990s and inspiring other producers to create their own fighting series. Additionally, it prolonged the survival of the declining video game arcade business market by stimulating business and driving the fighting game genre. It features a popular two-player mode that obligates human-to-human competitive play, inspiring grassroots tournament events, culminating in the Evolution Championship Series (EVO). Street Fighter II shifted the arcade competitive dynamic from achieving personal-best high scores to head-to-head competition, including large groups. Due to its major success, a series of updated versions were released with additional features and characters, starting with 1992's Street Fighter II: Champion Edition; its major successor was Street Fighter III in 1997.

== Gameplay ==
Guile defeats Ken with his Flash Kick on the arcade version.

Street Fighter II follows several conventions and rules established by its 1987 predecessor Street Fighter. The player engages opponents in a series of timed one-on-one, close-quarters combat matches. In order to win a round, the player must either completely drain the opponent's health bar by landing attacks, or have more health remaining when the timer runs out. Neither fighter wins the round if they have equal health when time expires or if they simultaneously knock each other out. The first fighter to win two rounds is declared the victor.

During a single-player game, a second player may join, starting a head-to-head match. The victor continues in single-player mode.

The original Street Fighter II allowed up to 10 rounds per match; this maximum is reduced to four rounds starting with the Champion Edition. If there is no clear winner by the end of the final round, either the computer-controlled opponent will win by default in a single-player match or both fighters will lose in a two-player match. After every third match in the single-player mode, a bonus stage gives the player a chance to earn additional points by smashing a car, wooden barrels, and or metal oil drums. After each match, the location for the next battle is automatically selected on a world map.

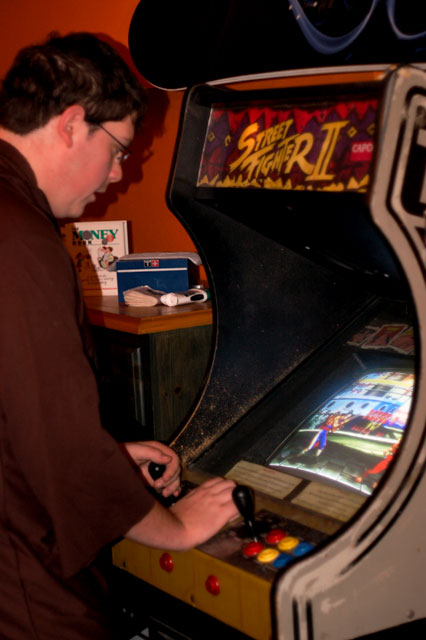
A man playing Street Fighter II on an arcade machine.

Like in Street Fighter, the controls consist of an eight-directional joystick and six attack buttons. The joystick a player uses can have the player jump, crouch, walk left and right, and block. A tradeoff of strength and speed are given by three punch buttons and three kick buttons, each consisting of light, medium, and heavy. The player can perform a variety of basic moves in any position, which includes grabbing and throwing attacks. Each character's special moves are performed by using certain combinations of directional and button-based commands.

Street Fighter II differs from its predecessor due to the selection of multiple playable characters, each with distinct fighting styles and special moves including combos. According to IGN, "the concept of combinations, linked attacks that can't be blocked when they're timed correctly, came about more or less by accident. Street Fighter II's designers didn't quite mean for it to happen, but players of the original game eventually found out that certain moves naturally flowed into other ones." This combo system was later adopted as a standard feature of fighting games and was expanded upon in this series.

== Plot ==
According to the timeline, the story was set two years after the events of Street Fighter Alpha 3 and three years before the events of Street Fighter IV.

Sometime after gaining a new body, M. Bison uses his Shadaloo organization to establish a base in a temple in Thailand. Bison also subjugated a nearby village to establish his criminal empire, but still provided the village with essential supplies. To lure out Ryu once more, Bison takes inspiration from his bodyguard Sagat to announce the Second World Fighting Tournament (Sagat was both the sponsor and final challenger of the First World Fighting Tournament four years prior) organized by Shadaloo.

The fighters have entered the tournament for different reasons: Ryu competes to test and prove his own fighting skill, while Ken, Zangief, and E. Honda each entered to prove to the entire world that they are the greatest fighting champions in history. Some other challengers entered for personal reasons, such as Blanka wanting to uncover his unknown past origin, and Dhalsim trying to raise money for his home village that was invaded and impoverished by Shadaloo. Guile and Chun-Li entered because of their own vendettas against M. Bison for murdering their respective loved ones, with both officers also vowing to bring Shadaloo to justice.

Bison's main intent is to retrieve Ryu's body and exact revenge on the fighters who had hindered his criminal organization's efforts by luring them into Shadaloo's Temple Hideout for Bison, Sagat, Vega, and Balrog to beat each one of them into submission so that no one can prevent him from global domination.

At the end of the Second World Fighting Tournament, Ryu becomes the two-time champion and earns the title of The World Warrior. At the award ceremony, Sagat has taken third place, and M. Bison second. However, the first place champion's spot is empty, much to the wonder of the crowd. As it turns out, Ryu has no need for ceremony, and is already on his way to seek out a new challenge, starting by training his Shoryukens under a waterfall.

== Characters ==
The original Street Fighter II features a roster of eight playable fighters. This includes Ryu and Ken—the main protagonists from Street Fighter—plus six new international newcomers. In the single-player tournament, the player fights the other seven main fighters, then the final opponents—a group of four CPU-only opponents known as the Grand Masters, which includes Sagat from Street Fighter.

Playable characters:

- Ryu (Note: Katakana: リュウ, Hepburn Rōmaji: 'Ryū'), a Japanese martial artist seeking no fame or even the crown of "champion", but only to hone his Ansatsuken Karate skills with the inner power of Chi. He dedicates his life to perfect his own potential while abandoning everything else, leading to having no family and few friends; his only bond is with Ken. He was the winner of the previous tournament but is not convinced that he is the greatest fighter in the world. He comes to this tournament in search of fresh competition.
- E. Honda, a sumo wrestler from Japan. He aims to improve the negative reputation of sumo wrestling by proving to competitors that he is a legitimate athlete.
- Blanka, a beast-like mutant from Brazil who was raised in the jungle. He enters the tournament to uncover more origins about his forgotten past.
- Guile, a former United States Air Force special forces operative seeking to defeat M. Bison, who killed his best friend Charlie.
- Ken, Ryu's best friend, greatest rival and former training partner, from the United States. Ryu's personal challenge rekindled Ken's fighting spirit and persuaded him to enter the World Warrior tournament, after feeling unenthusiastic about his fighting potential due to spending too much time with his fiancée.
- Chun-Li, a Chinese martial artist who works as an Interpol officer. Much like Guile, she does not enter the World Warrior tournament for any personal glory except proving that she can defeat any man who challenges her. Chun-Li's ambition in the past was tracking down the movements of the smuggling operation known as Shadaloo. Her trail led to the tournament where she seeks to avenge her deceased father by holding the Grand Master's leader of the crime syndicate responsible.
- Zangief, a professional wrestler and sambo fighter from the Soviet Union. He aims to prove "Soviet Strength" is the strongest form of strength, particularly by defeating American opponents with his bare hands.
- Dhalsim, a fire-breathing yoga master from India. He fights despite being a pacifist, with the goal of using the money to lift people out of poverty.

CPU-exclusive characters, in the order of appearance:

- Balrog, an American boxer with a similar appearance to Mike Tyson. Called M. Bison in Japan. Once one of the world's greatest heavyweight boxers, he began working for Shadaloo for easy money.
- Vega, a Spanish bullfighter who wields a claw and uses a unique style of ninjutsu. Called Balrog in Japan. He is vain and wishes to eliminate ugly people from the world.
- Sagat, a Muay Thai kickboxer from Thailand and former World Warrior champion from the original Street Fighter. He was once known as The King of Street Fighters until he got demoted to The King of Muai Thai in his own tournament due to a narrow defeat at the hands of Ryu's shoryuken (rising dragon punch) which left a deep gash across his chest. Ever since that moment, he has felt disgrace and will do anything to have a grudge match with Ryu to get his title back, even if it takes joining forces with Shadaloo.
- M. Bison, the leader of the criminal organization Shadaloo, who uses a mysterious power called Psycho Power, and the final opponent of the game. Called Vega in Japan.

Takayuki Nakayama stated in an interview that many character design ideas were trialed and dropped during the development process. Rejected character designs for Street Fighter II included another bullfighter and an American amateur wrestler.

== Regional differences ==
With the exception of Sagat, the Shadaloo Bosses have different names in the Japanese version. The boxer known as Balrog in the international versions was designed as a pastiche of real-life boxer Mike Tyson and was originally named M. Bison (short for "Mike Bison", with "Mike" being one of the American opponents faced in Street Fighter). Vega and M. Bison were originally named Balrog and Vega, respectively. When Street Fighter II was localized for the overseas market, the names of the bosses were rotated, out of concern that the boxer's similarities to Tyson could have led to a likeness infringement lawsuit. In international tournaments, the characters are often referred to as "Boxer", "Claw", and "Dictator", after their defining traits in order to avoid confusion.

The characters in the Japanese version have more than one win quote and if the player loses a match against the CPU in the Japanese version, a random playing tip will be shown at the bottom of the continue screen. While the ending text for the characters was originally translated literally, a few changes were made due to creative differences from Capcom's U.S. marketing staff. For example, the name of Guile's fallen friend (who later debuted as a playable fighter in Street Fighter Alpha) was changed from Nash to Charlie, since a staff member from Capcom USA said that Nash is not a natural sounding English name.

== Development ==
Although the original punching-pad cabinet of Street Fighter had not been very popular, the alternate six-button version was more successful, which began to generate interest in a sequel. Capcom began to make fighting games a priority after Final Fight was commercially successful in the United States. Yoshiki Okamoto recounted: "The basic idea at Capcom was to revive Street Fighter, a good game concept, to make it a better-playing arcade game."

Development of Street Fighter II took roughly two years and about 35 to 40 people, with Noritaka Funamizu as a producer, and Akira Nishitani and Akira Yasuda in charge of the game and character design, respectively. The budget was estimated at $2,450,000 (equivalent to $5,790,000 in 2025).

Funamizu notes that the developers did not particularly prioritize Street Fighter II's balance. He primarily ascribes the game's success to its appealing animation patterns. The quality of animation benefited from the developers' use of the CPS-1 hardware, with advantages including allowing different characters to occupy different amounts of memory. For example, Ryu can occupy 8 megabits and Zangief 12 megabits.

The combo system came about by accident:

While I was making a bug check during the car bonus stage... I noticed something strange, curious. I taped the sequence and we saw that during the punch timing, it was possible to add a second hit and so on. I thought this was something impossible to make useful inside a game, as the timing balance was so hard to catch. So we decided to leave the feature as a hidden one. The most interesting thing is that this became the base for future titles. Later we were able to make the timing more comfortable and the combo into a real feature. In [Street Fighter II] we thought if you got the perfect timing you could place several hits, up to four I think. Then we managed to place eight! A bug? Maybe.

— Noritaka Funamizu

During development, Nishitani proposed various concepts for the game that were eventually scrapped, including a dual-monitor arcade cabinet, a "10 player battle royale" mode, a "chain deathmatch" with the fighters' arms bound, a tower stage where falling from a ring out leads to player death, and an underwater stage with limited air supply.

The vast majority of in-game music was composed by Yoko Shimomura. This is ultimately the only game in the series on which Shimomura worked, as she left the company for Square two years later. Isao Abe, a Capcom newcomer, handled a few additional tracks ("Versus Screen", "Sagat's Theme", and "Here Comes A New Challenger") for Street Fighter II and became the main composer on the subsequent versions. The sound programming and sound effects were overseen by Yoshihiro Sakaguchi, the composer on Street Fighter.

Location testing began in Japan. It was then exhibited in the United Kingdom at London's Amusement Trades Exhibition International (ATEI) in January 1991. The same month, Capcom held a two-week location test in North America, before unveiling the game at Capcom's distributor conference on February 1, 1991, held at Marriott Harbor Beach, Fort Lauderdale, Florida. Capcom introduced Street Fighter II as its "greatest video game ever".

== Updated versions ==
Street Fighter II spawned a series of revisions that were released in arcades, but were later ported to various platforms, as individual releases and also in compilations. Each entry refined the play mechanics, graphics, character roster, and other aspects of the game:

- Street Fighter II: Champion Edition, released in March 1992, rebalances characters' power levels, allows both players in two-player matches to select the same character (distinguished by alternate costume colors) and lets players choose the four previously computer-only boss characters.
- Street Fighter II Turbo: Hyper Fighting, released in December 1992, increases the playing speed and gave some characters new special moves. It was created as Capcom's official response to a wave of unauthorized modifications for arcade cabinets of Champion Edition that appeared throughout 1992, such as Street Fighter II': Rainbow Edition.
- Super Street Fighter II: The New Challengers, released in September 1993, used the more advanced CP System II which allowed for updated graphics and audio. It introduces four new characters, but relieved the speed increase of Street Fighter II Turbo: Hyper Fighting.
- Super Street Fighter II Turbo, released in February 1994, combines the improvements of Super Street Fighter II with the previous Turbo (Hyper Fighting) edition. It allows for a selective game speed, introduces powered-up special moves called Super Combos, and adds a new hidden character.

Later home console ports further reinvented elements from the arcades:

- Hyper Street Fighter II: The Anniversary Edition, released in December 2003, allowed players to choose one of five styles for the game, each based on the previous Street Fighter II iterations' unique characteristics. It was later given an arcade release, and is a part of the collection of video games at the Museum of Modern Art to represent the Street Fighter II subseries as a whole.
- Super Street Fighter II Turbo HD Remix, released in November 2008, is a remake of Super Street Fighter II Turbo using high-definition graphics.
- Ultra Street Fighter II: The Final Challengers released in May 2017, added three additional characters who previously debuted outside the Street Fighter II line of titles. It also allows the player to choose between displaying the original graphics style of the first six Street Fighter II games or the remade graphics from Turbo HD Remix.

In addition to the official updated versions, numerous counterfeit modified versions of Street Fighter II (including the Rainbow Edition) were in wide circulation. For example, nine different counterfeit versions were available on the Super Famicom in Japan by December 1992.

== Ports ==
Release date	Platform	Media	Developer	Publisher	Notes
JP: June 10, 1992; NA: July 15, 1992; EU: October, 1992	Super NES	ROM cartridge	Capcom	JP: Capcom; NA: Capcom; EU: Bandai	Re-released on the Wii and Wii U Virtual Console.
1992	Amiga	4 floppy disks	Creative Materials	U.S. Gold	Released in Europe.
1992	Atari ST	4 floppy disks	Creative Materials	U.S. Gold	Released in Europe.
1992	Commodore 64	Cassette or floppy disk	Creative Materials	U.S. Gold	Released in Europe.
1992	MS-DOS	3 floppy disks	Creative Materials	EU: U.S. Gold; NA: Hi Tech Expressions	Released in North America and Europe.
1992	Tiger Electronics	Custom LCD hardware (handheld)	Tiger Electronics	Tiger Electronics	
1993	ZX Spectrum	Cassette or floppy disk	Tiertex Design Studios	U.S. Gold	Released in Europe.
1994	CPS Changer	ROM cartridge	Capcom	Capcom	Released exclusively in Japan.
1995	Game Boy	ROM cartridge	Sun L	Capcom; Nintendo	
1998	Saturn	CD-ROM	Capcom	Capcom	Included in Capcom Generation 5. Released exclusively in Japan.
1998	PlayStation	CD-ROM	Capcom	Capcom	Included in Street Fighter Collection 2.
2004	Mobile	Online distribution	Capcom	Capcom	
2006	PlayStation 2	DVD-ROM	Digital Eclipse	Capcom	Included in Capcom Classics Collection Vol. 1. Based on the PS1 version.
2006	Xbox	DVD-ROM	Digital Eclipse	Capcom	Included in Capcom Classics Collection Vol. 1. Based on the PS1 version.
2006	PlayStation Portable	UMD	Capcom	Capcom	Included in Capcom Classics Collection: Reloaded. Based on the PS1 version.
2018	PlayStation 4	BD-ROM	Digital Eclipse	Capcom	Included in Street Fighter 30th Anniversary Collection.
2018	Xbox One	BD-ROM	Digital Eclipse	Capcom	Included in Street Fighter 30th Anniversary Collection.
2018	Nintendo Switch	Flash based ROM cartridges	Digital Eclipse	Capcom	Included in Street Fighter 30th Anniversary Collection.
2018	Windows	Online distribution	Digital Eclipse	Capcom	Included in Street Fighter 30th Anniversary Collection.

=== Super NES ===
Street Fighter II was released for the Super Famicom on June 10, 1992, in Japan, followed by a North American release for the SNES in August and a European release in December. It is the first game released on a 16-megabit SNES cartridge. Many aspects from the arcade versions were either altered or simplified in order to fit into the smaller memory capacity. This version has a secret code allowing both players to control the same character in a match, which is not possible in the original arcade version. The second player uses the same alternate color palette introduced in Street Fighter II: Champion Edition. The four Shadaloo Bosses are still non-playable, but the code enables their Champion Edition color palette. Tatsuya Nishimura, who had recently joined Capcom from TOSE, arranged the soundtrack with assistance from Shimomura, Abe, and Sakaguchi.

The North American SNES version was re-released in November 2017 as a limited edition item to celebrate the anniversary of the Street Fighter series.

=== Home computers ===
U.S. Gold released versions of Street Fighter II for home computers in Europe: Amiga, Atari ST, Commodore 64, MS-DOS, and ZX Spectrum. These were developed by Creative Materials, except for the ZX Spectrum version which was developed by Tiertex Design Studios. The MS-DOS version was also published in North America by Hi-Tech Expressions. These versions suffer numerous inaccuracies, such as missing graphical assets and music tracks, miscolored palettes, and lack of six-button controls due to these platforms having only one or two-button joysticks as standard at the time. Though officially advertised by US Gold along with the C64 and ZX Spectrum conversions and anticipated in magazines, an Amstrad CPC version was never released.

=== Tiger Electronics ===
This standalone handheld machine was missing Chun-Li and Dhalsim.

=== Game Boy ===
The Game Boy version of Street Fighter II was released on August 11, 1995, in Japan, and in September 1995 internationally. It is missing Dhalsim, E. Honda, and Vega. The graphics, character portraits, and stages are based on Super Street Fighter II, although some moves (ex: Blanka's Amazon River Run) from Super Street Fighter II Turbo are included. Because the Game Boy only has two buttons, the strength of punches and kicks is determined by the duration of button presses.

=== Compilations ===
Street Fighter II, Champion Edition, and Turbo are in the compilation Capcom Generation 5 for the PlayStation and Sega Saturn, which was released in North America and Europe as Street Fighter Collection 2. All three games are in Capcom Classics Collection Vol. 1 for the PlayStation 2 and Xbox, and in Capcom Classics Collection Reloaded for the PlayStation Portable. In 2011, all three games were released on iOS devices as the Street Fighter II Collection, though the compilation was later delisted from the App Store. In 2018, Street Fighter II was one of the many games included in the Street Fighter 30th Anniversary Collection for the PlayStation 4, Nintendo Switch, Xbox One and Windows.

== Reception ==
=== Commercial ===
By 1994, Street Fighter II had been played by an estimated 25 million people in the United States alone, across arcades and homes. All versions of Street Fighter II are estimated to have grossed a total of $10.61 billion in revenue, mostly from the arcade market. As of 2017, it is one of the top three highest-grossing video games of all time, along with Space Invaders (1978) and Pac-Man (1980).

==== Arcade versions ====
Street Fighter II was not immediately successful in Japan, as most arcade players were initially playing it solo, rather than multiplayer as originally intended. Yoshiki Okamoto was disappointed with its initial performance, and was told he should have produced another solo beat 'em up like Final Fight instead. After Japanese arcade magazine Gamest began publishing articles informing readers about the "battle play" feature, the game began gaining considerable popularity in Japanese arcades. In Japan, Game Machine magazine listed the game as the second most successful table arcade cabinet of March 1991, outperforming games such as Detana!! TwinBee and King of the Monsters, before Street Fighter II topped the charts two weeks later. It went on to become the highest-grossing arcade game of 1991 in Japan, and then became the highest-grossing arcade game of 1992. Street Fighter II Turbo became the highest-grossing arcade game of 1993, with Street Fighter II Dash (Champion Edition) at number four and The World Warrior at number nine.

Street Fighter II was similarly successful in the Western world. In the United States, the game was more immediately successful as it exceeded expectations in test markets, with individual machines earning $1,300–1,400 per week. Capcom USA sales representative Jeff Walker predicted it would "become the kit of 1991", and RePlay magazine said it showed there was "plenty of life" left in the struggling arcade business. By March, it had become a blockbuster and the top-grossing game in the United States, giving a large boost in earnings for street operators. It topped the RePlay arcade software charts from May 1991 through August 1992, for a total of 16 months. On the Play Meter arcade charts, it was the top-grossing video game during January–February 1992 and May 1992. Street Fighter II was the highest-grossing arcade game of 1991 in the United States, and one of the top five highest-grossing arcade conversion kits of 1992 (below Champion Edition). Its success was considered phenomenal. By 1992, it had turned around the convenience store segment of the coin-op industry and become the best-selling arcade game in ten years. Electronic Games noted in its October 1992 issue, "Not since the early 1980s has an arcade game received so much attention and all-out fanatical popularity." It was similarly successful in Australia, where it was performing strongly after 16 months on the market, with Leisure Line magazine noting in 1992 that not "since the days of Space Invaders (1978) has a game had such longevity".

In 1991, 50,000 arcade units were sold worldwide, including 17,000 in Japan, with Capcom reporting continued production of arcade units due to repeat orders. In the United Kingdom, Your Commodore reported in July 1991 that spectators were betting on players at London West End arcades. Between early 1991 and early 1993, Street Fighter II had captured about 60% of the global coin-op market, including 10,000 units installed in the United Kingdom by mid-1991, with individual machines in the UK estimated to be taking between £70–1,000 per week over the next two years. Street Fighter II generated an estimated annual revenue of £260 million in the UK for the two years between mid-1991 and mid-1993, totaling £520 million ($913 million at the time, equivalent to $2.09 billion in 2025).

Capcom sold more than 60,000 arcade machines of the original Street Fighter II, including about 20,000 to 25,000 units in the United States. It was followed by Street Fighter II′ (Dash or Champion Edition), of which 140,000 arcade units were sold in Japan alone, where it cost ¥160,000 ($1300) for each unit, amounting to ¥22.4 billion ($182 million) revenue generated from hardware sales in Japan (equivalent to $430 million in 2025), in addition to about 20,000 to 25,000 units sold in the United States. On the US RePlay arcade charts for July 1992, Champion Edition was number one on the upright cabinets chart (above Midway's Mortal Kombat), while the original Street Fighter II was number two on the coin-op software chart (below SNK's World Heroes). Street Fighter II generated $1.5 billion (equivalent to $3.44 billion in 2025) annually in 1993, making it the year's highest-grossing entertainment product, above the film Jurassic Park. In January 1994, Capcom referred to Street Fighter II as "the most successful video game series of the decade" while promoting Super Street Fighter II. In early 1994, Capcom projected sales of Super Street Fighter II to reach 100,000 arcade units. According to the March 1995 issue of GameFan, the game had earned "billions of dollars in profit".

Title	Region	Hardware sales	Coin drop revenue (est. US$)		Peak chart position
Title	Region	Hardware sales	No inflation	With inflation	Peak chart position
Street Fighter II: The World Warrior	Japan	60,000+	Unknown	Unknown	#1
Street Fighter II: The World Warrior	Australia	60,000+	Unknown	Unknown	#1
Street Fighter II: The World Warrior	Hong Kong	60,000+	Unknown	Unknown	#1
Street Fighter II: The World Warrior	United Kingdom	60,000+	$913 million (as of 1993)	$2.1 billion	#1
Street Fighter II: The World Warrior	United States	60,000+	Unknown	Unknown	#1
Street Fighter II: Champion Edition	Japan	140,000	$2.312 billion (as of 1995)	$5.3 billion	#1
Street Fighter II: Champion Edition	United States	20,000+	$2.312 billion (as of 1995)	$5.3 billion	#1
Street Fighter II: Champion Edition	Australia	Unknown	$2.312 billion (as of 1995)	$5.3 billion	#1
Street Fighter II Turbo	Japan	Unknown	Unknown	Unknown	#1
Street Fighter II Turbo	United States	Unknown	Unknown	Unknown	#1
Super Street Fighter II	Japan	Unknown	Unknown	Unknown	#1
Super Street Fighter II	United States	1,000+	Unknown	Unknown	#1
Super Street Fighter II Turbo	Japan	Unknown	Unknown	Unknown	#1
Super Street Fighter II Turbo	United States	Unknown	Unknown	Unknown	#1
Total	Worldwide	221,000+	$5.31 billion+	$12.55 billion+	#1

In addition to Capcom's official arcade units, many pirated counterfeit Street Fighter II arcade clone units were sold across the world. RePlay noted in January 1993 that Street Fighter II had "single-handedly re-ignited the worldwide black market in counterfeit PCBs and speed-up kits". Many counterfeit arcade units often outsold official Street Fighter II arcade cabinets in various markets. For example, about 200,000 counterfeits were in Mexico alone, where Capcom did not officially sell the game. Bondeal from Hong Kong produced 3,000 copied arcade units per month for markets like Latin America, and a Taiwanese firm produced 20,000 copied arcade units in 1991; in Taiwan, up to 150,000 clone units were manufactured by 1992. Many counterfeit units were in South Korea, such as a trader selling about 100 Street Fighter II PCBs by 1992. Seven different versions of the game claimed to be sequels in 1992, mostly from Hong Kong, and one named Champion of Champion Editions reportedly was in British arcades. Capcom and its partners took legal action against counterfeit arcade units in regions such as Southeast Asia, North America, South Korea, and Puerto Rico.

==== Home conversions ====
The numerous home conversions of Street Fighter II are listed among Capcom's Platinum-class games, with more than one million units sold worldwide. In Japan, 1 million copies of the Super Famicom version were sold in June 1992 within the first two weeks of its release, at a retail price of ¥10,780 (equivalent to $85.12 then, or $195 in 2025). The February 1992 issue of Gamest in Japan said that, due to low stock, the console versions were selling for much higher at ¥15,000 (equivalent to about $119.19 at the time, or $273 in 2025). It topped the Japanese Famitsu sales charts from June through July to August 1992. It was a multi-million seller in Japan by December 1992.

In the United States, 750,000 units of the SNES version were sold between July 15 and September 30, 1992, with a retail price of $74.99 (equivalent to $170 in 2025). According to Electronic Gaming Monthly: "Never has a game taken the country [by] storm as this one has." It remained America's top-selling Super NES game for much of late 1992, in August and then October, November, and December. In 1992 in North America, 2 million units were sold. In the United Kingdom, Street Fighter II replaced Super Mario World as the bundled game for the SNES, and the SNES and Amiga versions made it the second best-selling home video game of 1992, below Sonic the Hedgehog 2 for the Mega Drive. Worldwide, four million Street Fighter II cartridges had been sold by September 1992, 5 million units by the end of 1992, and over 6 million by 1993. The SNES version became the company's best-selling single consumer game software, at more than 6.3 million units, and it remains its best-selling game software on a single platform. By 1993, 10 million units of all home software versions had been sold, and 11.9 million units for Nintendo and Sega consoles by March 1994.

The SNES versions of Street Fighter II Turbo and Super Street Fighter II had 4.1 million and two million unit sales, respectively, followed by the Mega Drive/Genesis version of Street Fighter II: Special Champion Edition with 1.65 million sales. In total, more than 14 million copies were sold for the SNES and Mega Drive/Genesis consoles. The SNES version of Street Fighter II was Capcom's best-selling single game until 2013, when it was surpassed by Resident Evil 5. The Amiga version was successful in the United Kingdom, where it became the best-selling home computer software of 1992, though only being available for the last 16 days of the year. Street Fighter II also topped the UK's Amiga sales chart in January 1993, and the UK's Atari ST chart in March 1993. In 2008, Super Street Fighter II Turbo HD Remix broke both the first-day and first-week sales records for a download-only game. Street Fighter II was the best-selling fighting game with 15.5 million units sold across all versions and platforms, until it was surpassed by Super Smash Bros. Ultimate in 2019.

Title	Platform(s)	Worldwide sales	Japan sales	Revenue	Inflation
Street Fighter II: The World Warrior	Super NES	6,300,000	2,900,000	$1.5 billion+	$3.44 billion+
Street Fighter II: Special Champion Edition	Mega Drive	1,665,000	Unknown	$1.5 billion+	$3.44 billion+
Street Fighter II Turbo	Super NES	4,100,000	2,100,000	$1.5 billion+	$3.44 billion+
Super Street Fighter II: The New Challengers	Super NES	2,000,000	1,300,000	Unknown	Unknown
Street Fighter II	Game Boy	17,038+	17,038	Unknown	Unknown
Super Street Fighter II Turbo: Revival	Game Boy Advance	45,335+	45,335	Unknown	Unknown
Hyper Street Fighter II: The Anniversary Edition	PlayStation 2	53,000+	53,000	Unknown	Unknown
Super Street Fighter II Turbo HD Remix	PS3 / Xbox 360	250,000+	Unknown	Unknown	Unknown
Ultra Street Fighter II	Nintendo Switch	500,000	100,000	Unknown	Unknown
Total sales		15,500,000	6,515,373+		

Like the arcades, the home conversions were impacted by copyright infringement. Upon release of the SNES version in 1992, thirteen different unauthorized versions were reportedly available for the Super Famicom.

=== Critical ===
Contemporary reception

Review scores
Publication	Score						
Publication	Amiga	Arcade	Atari ST	C64	Game Boy	SNES	ZX
Computer and Video Games	78%	93%					
Edge						9/10	
Electronic Gaming Monthly					29/40	38/40	
Famitsu					21/40	9/10, 9/10, 9/10, 8/10	
GamePro						5/5	
Mean Machines						98%	
Nintendo Power						16.2/20	
Sinclair User		84%					89%
Your Sinclair							62%
Bad Influence!						96%	
Electronic Games						94%	
Mega Zone				84%		95%	
Play Meter		94%					
RePlay		Positive					
SNES Force						92%	
ST Format			91%				
Super Play						94%	
Your Commodore		Positive					

Awards
Publication	Award
Gamest Grand Prize	Game of the Year, Best Action Game, Best Album, Best VGM, Best Direction, Best Characters, Best Graphics (Runner-Up)
Electronic Gaming Awards	Video Game of the Year, Best Action Video Game
Electronic Gaming Monthly (EGM)	Game of the Year, Best Game of the Year (Super Nintendo), Best Video Game Ending, Hottest Video Game Babe (Chun-Li)
European Computer Trade Show (ECTS)	Overall Game of the Year, Best Action Game, Italian Game of the Year
Golden Joystick Awards	Game of the Year, Console Game of the Year, Best Licensed Console Game
GameFan Golden Megawards	Best Game, Best Arcade Translation, Best One-on-One Fighting Game, Best Character (Dhalsim & Guile)
Game Informer	Game of the Year, Best Playability in a Video Game
Chicago Tribune	Game of the Year
GamePro	16-bit Game of the Year
Nintendo Power	Game of the Year (SNES), Theme and Fun (SNES), Play Control (SNES), Best/Worst Villain (Bison)

==== Japan ====
The original arcade version of Street Fighter II was awarded Best Game of 1991 in Gamest's Fifth Annual Grand Prize, which also won in the genre of Best Action Game (the award for fighting games was not established yet). Street Fighter II placed No. 1 in Best VGM, Best Direction, and Best Album, and was second place in Best Graphics below the 3D Namco System 21 game Starblade. All the characters except M. Bison (known internationally as Balrog) are on the list of Best Characters of 1991.

Street Fighter II Dash was awarded Best Game of 1992 in the Sixth Annual Grand Prize, as published in the February 1993 issue of Gamest, winning again as Best Action Game. It placed No. 3 in Best VGM, No. 6 in Best Graphics, and No. 5 in Best Direction. The Street Fighter II Image Album is the No. 1 Best Album in the same issue, with the Drama CD version of Street Fighter II tied for No. 7 with the soundtrack for Star Blade. The List of Best Characters only had Chun-Li at No. 3.

In the February 1994 issue of Gamest, both Street Fighter II Turbo and Super Street Fighter II were nominated for Best Game of 1993, but neither won (the first place was given to Samurai Spirits). Super ranked third place, and Turbo ranked sixth. In the category of Best Fighting Games, Super ranked third place again, while Turbo placed fifth. Super won third place in the categories of Best Graphics and Best VGM. Cammy, who was introduced in Super, placed fifth place in the list of Best Characters of 1993, with Dee Jay at 36 and T. Hawk at 37. In the January 30, 1995 issue of Gamest, Super Street Fighter II X (known as Super Turbo internationally) placed fourth place in the award for Best Game of 1994 and Best Fighting Game, but did not rank in any of the other awards.

The Super Famicom (SNES) version was critically acclaimed. Famitsu's panel of four reviewers gave it scores of 9, 9, 9, and 8, adding up to 35 out of 40. This made it one of their five highest-rated games of 1992, along with Dragon Quest V: Hand of the Heavenly Bride, Shin Megami Tensei, World of Illusion Starring Mickey Mouse and Donald Duck, and Mario Paint. They later gave the Turbo update a score of 36 out of 40. This made Street Fighter II Turbo their highest-rated game of 1993, and the twelfth game to have received a Famitsu score of 36/40 or above.

==== International ====
The arcade game was well received by English-language critics upon release. In March 1991, RePlay said that "the graphics and sounds are tops" while praising the "solid" gameplay, and it was considered the top game at the American Coin Machine Exposition (ACME) that month. In May 1991, Julian Rignall of Computer and Video Games gave it ratings of 94% for graphics, 93% for sound, 95% for playability, and 92% for lastability, with a 93% score overall. He criticized the original Street Fighter for being a "run-of-the-mill beat 'em up with little in the way of thrills and spills" but praised the sequel for being "absolutely packed with new ideas" and special moves. He noted the "six buttons combining with 8 joystick directions to provide more moves than I've ever seen in a beat 'em up" and praised the "massive, beautifully drawn and animated sprites, tons of speech and the most exciting, action-packed head-to-head conflict yet seen in an arcade game," concluding that it is "one of the best fighting games yet seen in the arcades" and a "brilliant" coin-op. In the June 1991 issue of Sinclair User, John Cook gave the arcade game an "addict factor" of 84%. He praised the gameplay and the "excellent" animation and sound effects, but criticized the controls, stating players "might find the control system a bit daunting at first [with] a joystick plus six (count 'em!) fire buttons [but] it's not that bad really". He concluded "this is bound to appeal to you if you like the beat 'em up style of game." Jeff Davy of Your Commodore praised the game for its large sprites, character animation, varied opponents, character moves, and two-player mode. Computer and Video Games later referred to Street Fighter II as the "game of the millennium" in 1992.

The SNES version of Street Fighter II was very well received. In Electronic Gaming Monthly (EGM), its panel of four reviewers gave it scores of 10, 9, 10, and 9, adding up to 38 out of 40, and their "Game of the Month" award. Sushi-X (Ken Williams) gave it a 10, calling it "The best! Street Fighter II is the only game I have ever seen that really deserves a 10!" Martin Alessi gave it a 9, describing it as "the best cart available anywhere! Incredible game play!" Ed Semrad gave it a 10, saying "The moves are perfect, the graphics outstanding and the audio exceptional. Get one of the new 6 button sticks and you'll swear you're playing the arcade version." GamePro printed two reviews of the game in its August 1992 issue, both giving it a full score of 5 out of 5; Doctor Dave described it as "Capcom's best arcade conversion yet" while Slasher Quan stated that almost "everything's perfect in the Super NES version" and that it is "a nearly flawless conversion of the arcade original that's made even more enjoyable by new options and the convenience of home fighting." Super Play gave it a 94% score, stating that with "the inclusion of Champion Edition's Character vs. Character select and the extra options, I would even go so far to say that this is actually better than the coin-op." Electronic Games gave it scores of 95% for graphics, 92% for sound, and 93% for playability, with a 94% overall, concluding that it is the best fighting game to date. Nintendo Power scored it 16.2 out of 20, stating that the "hottest arcade game around has been faithfully reproduced for this Super NES conversion" and that it "is just like having the arcade game at home!". Nintendo Power ranked it the best SNES game of 1992, above The Legend of Zelda: A Link to the Past in second place.

Computer Gaming World in April 1994 said that "Street Fighter II now enters the PC ring rather late and with a touch of weak wrist". The magazine reported that "the atmosphere and the impact of hefty welts and bone-crushing action is just not here. The usual lament of many PC gamers about arcade conversions is once again true: too little and too late".

Entertainment Weekly wrote: "Sure, it's violent (people can be set on fire), but Street Fighter II offers a depth of play (each character has more than 20 different moves) unmatched by any other video-game slugfest."

Street Fighter II was named by Electronic Gaming Monthly as the Game of the Year for 1992. EGM awarded Street Fighter II Turbo with Best Super NES Game in 1993. Street Fighter II won the Golden Joystick Award for Game of the Year in 1992. Game Informer gave it the "Best Game of the Year" and "Best Playability in a Video Game" awards. It won Electronic Games's Electronic Gaming Award for the Video Game of the Year, where it was nominated along with NHLPA Hockey '93 and Sonic the Hedgehog 2.

The Mega Drive version of Street Fighter II received ten out of ten for both graphics and addiction from Mega, who described it as "a candidate for best game ever and without a doubt the best beat-'em-up of all time" and gave it an overall 92% score. MegaTech scored it 95% and awarded it Hyper Game, stating "the greatest coin-op hits the Megadrive in perfect form". Edge gave the PC Engine version of Champion Edition a score of eight out of ten. The four reviewers of Electronic Gaming Monthly, while remarking that the Game Boy control is difficult, the game speed "lethargically slow", and it is a very old game, agreed it to be an excellent conversion by Game Boy standards. The Axe Grinder of GamePro agreed, praising the graphics and Game Boy survival mode, but criticizing the slow controls and concluding that "The real problem here is that the game's just plain old."

==== Retrospective ====
Retrospective reception

Aggregate score
Aggregator	Score				
Aggregator	Arcade	C64	Game Boy	SNES	Wii
GameRankings				82%	

Review scores
Publication	Score				
Publication	Arcade	C64	Game Boy	SNES	Wii
AllGame	5/5	2.5/5	4/5	4.5/5	
Eurogamer					9/10
GameSpot					7.2/10
IGN					7/10

Street Fighter II has been listed among the best games of all time. Game Rankings aggregated the SNES reviews since 1992 with a reported ranking of 81.57% indicating an overall positive reception. The staff praised it for popularizing the one-on-one fighting game genre and noted that its Super NES ports were "near-perfect." They later ranked it the 25th-best game ever made in 2009. Game Informer ranked it as the 22nd-best game ever made in 2001. Other publications that listed it among the best games of all time include BuzzFeed, Electronic Gaming Monthly, IGN, Edge, Empire, Famitsu, FHM, G4, GameFAQs, GameSpot, GamingBolt, Guinness World Records, Next Generation, NowGamer, Retro Gamer, Stuff, Time, and Yahoo! Guinness World Records awarded Street Fighter II the world records of "First Fighting Game to Use Combos", "Most Cloned Fighting Game", and "Biggest-Selling Coin-Operated Fighting Game" in the Guinness World Records: Gamer's Edition 2008. In 2017, The Strong National Museum of Play inducted Street Fighter II to its World Video Game Hall of Fame.

GameSpot gave the PlayStation 3 version of HD Remix a score of 8.5 out of 10.

PC Gamer listed the 1993 DOS version of Street Fighter II as one of the worst PC ports of all time.

== Legacy ==
=== Sequels ===
The Street Fighter II games were followed by several sub-series of Street Fighter games and spinoffs, including Street Fighter EX, Pocket Fighter, Super Puzzle Fighter II Turbo, and Vs. series. A prequel to Street Fighter II, Street Fighter Alpha, was released in 1995. The direct sequel to Street Fighter II, Street Fighter III, would be released in 1997. Capcom released Street Fighter IV for the arcades in July 2008, followed by Xbox 360 and PlayStation 3 in February 2009 and Microsoft Windows in July 2009. Street Fighter V was released for the PlayStation 4 and Windows in 2016. Street Fighter 6 was released for the PlayStation 4, PlayStation 5, Windows and Xbox Series X/S in June 2023, an arcade version was released in Japan in December 2023.

=== Other media ===
- The characters joined the G.I. Joe: A Real American Hero lineup in 1993, as Hasbro bought their toy rights.
- An unofficial South Korean animation, Street Fighter, was produced by Daiwon Animation in 1992 and features the cast of Street Fighter II. The Hong Kong movie Future Cops has a renamed cast of Street Fighter II characters.
- Two film adaptations were released in 1994: Street Fighter II: The Animated Movie, a Japanese anime film produced by Group TAC; and Street Fighter, an American live-action film starring Jean-Claude Van Damme.
- A U.S. Street Fighter cartoon follows a combined plot of the live-action movie and the game series. An unrelated anime, Street Fighter II V, features younger characters similar to The Legend of Chun-Li.
- Capcom sponsored IndyCar driver Kenji Momota at the 1992 Indianapolis 500, providing a Street Fighter livery for his No. 88 car, which failed to qualify.

=== Impact ===
Street Fighter II is regarded as one of the most influential video games of all time, and the most important fighting game in particular. The release of Street Fighter II in 1991 is often considered a revolutionary moment in the fighting game genre. It has the most accurate joystick and button scanning routine in the genre, allowing players to reliably execute multi-button special moves, and its graphics use Capcom's CPS arcade chipset, with highly detailed characters and stages. Whereas previous games allow players to combat a variety of computer-controlled fighters, Street Fighter II allows human combat.

The popularity of Street Fighter II surprised the gaming industry, as arcade owners bought more machines to keep up with demand. It was responsible for introducing the combo mechanic, which came about when skilled players learned that they could combine several attacks with no time for the opponent to recover. Its success inspired a wave of other fighting games, which were initially often labeled as "clones" or imitators, including titles such as Guardians of the 'Hood, Art of Fighting, Time Killers, Mortal Kombat, and Killer Instinct. Street Fighter II also influenced the development of the combat mechanics of beat 'em up game Streets of Rage 2. However, Street Fighter II also received criticism for its depiction of street violence, and for having inspired numerous other violent games in the industry.

Street Fighter II was the best-selling arcade video game by far since the golden age of arcade video games, bringing an arcade renaissance in the early 1990s. Its impact on home video games was equally crucial, becoming a long-lasting system-seller for the Super Nintendo Entertainment System. Since then, up until the late 1990s, numerous best-selling home video games were arcade ports. In 2005, Electronic Gaming Monthly ranked it the ninth most important game since they began publication in 1989, stating no game "did more to prop up arcades" in the 1990s and it was the first killer app for the SNES.

The game popularized the concept of "face-to-face", tournament-level competition between two players instead of just high scores. This enabled the competitive multiplayer and deathmatch modes found in modern action games. John Romero, for example, cited the competitive multiplayer of Street Fighter II as an influence on the deathmatch mode of seminal first-person shooter Doom.

It is an innovation in revision series, with Capcom continuously upgrading and expanding the arcade game instead of releasing a sequel. This furthered the practice of patches and downloadable content found in modern video games.

=== Popular culture ===
Street Fighter II has been frequently sampled and referenced in hip-hop, by artists such as The Lady of Rage, Nicki Minaj, Lupe Fiasco, Dizzee Rascal, Lil B, Sean Price, and Madlib. This started with Hi-C's "Swing'n" (1993) and DJ Qbert's "Track 10" (1994) which sampled Street Fighter II, and the Street Fighter film soundtrack (1994) which is the first major film soundtrack to consist almost entirely of hip-hop music. According to DJ Qbert, "I think hip-hop is a cool thing, I think Street Fighter is a cool thing". According to Vice magazine, "Street Fighter's mixture of competition, bravado, and individualism easily translate into the trials and travails of a rapper." The "Perfect" sample was used by Kanye West and Drake in The Life of Pablo (2016). UK rap includes grime DJ Logan Sama saying, "Street Fighter is just a huge cultural thing that everyone experienced growing up [with] such a huge impact that it has just stayed in everyone's consciousness." According to Jake Hawkes of Soapbox, "grime was built around lyrical clashes [and] the 1v1 setup of these clashes was easily equated with Street Fighter's 1 on 1 battles." Grime MCs such as Dizzee Rascal were sampling Street Fighter II in 2002, and Street Fighter II has been sampled "by almost every grime MC". It became an integral part of BBC Radio 1Xtra DJ Charlie Sloth's Fire in the Booth freestyle segments, using samples such as "Hadouken", "Shoryuken", and the "Perfect" announcer sound.
