= OverClocked ReMix =

Video game music community, founded 1999

- The OverClocked ReMix homepage in mid-2014, showing the latest ReMixes arranged soundtracks from several Game Boy titles
- Website type: Video game music tribute site
- Owners: OverClocked ReMix, LLC
- Creator: David W. Lloyd (djpretzel)
- Revenue: Non-commercial
- Website: ocremix.org
- Commercial: No
- Registration: No
- Launched: December 11, 1999
- Current status: Active

OverClocked ReMix, also known as OC ReMix and OCR, is a non-commercial organization dedicated to preserving and paying tribute to video game music through arranging and re-interpreting the songs, both with new technology and software and by various traditional means. The primary focus of OC ReMix is its website, ocremix.org, which freely hosts over 5,000 curated fan-made video game music arrangements, information on game music and composers, and resources for aspiring artists. In addition to the individual works, called "ReMixes", the site hosts over 70 albums of music, including both albums of arrangements centered on a particular video game, series, or theme, and albums of original compositions for video games. The OC ReMix community created the Super Street Fighter II Turbo HD Remix soundtrack for Capcom in 2008, and began publishing commercially licensed arrangement albums in 2013.

The founder of OverClocked ReMix and its parent company OverClocked ReMix, LLC is David W. Lloyd (a.k.a. djpretzel), who coined the word "ReMix" to refer to distinctive and interpretive arrangements, as opposed to a remix which typically involves less transformative alterations to the original works. Lloyd originally curated all of the submissions to the site, but since 2002 submissions are judged by a panel of community members for quality and originality. The site has been positively received by both critics and video game industry professionals, and several video game composers have submitted their own ReMixes. Multiple OC ReMix contributors have gone on to have professional video game composition careers.

== History ==
OverClocked ReMix was founded by David W. Lloyd, using the screen name djpretzel, as a video game music hosting website on December 11, 1999. Lloyd, who had just created an arrangement of the title theme from Phantasy Star III: Generations of Doom titled "Legacy", created the "DJ Pretzel's OverClocked ReMix" database as a way to host and share it and other arrangements and remixes of his. The name was taken from OverClocked, a webcomic about playing and emulating video games Lloyd was working on. "ReMix" was a term he invented to distinguish interpretive arrangements from a remix which typically involves less transformative alterations to master recordings. Over the next few months, Lloyd began adding arrangements from other artists.

At the time, there was a mixing scene that focused only on Commodore 64 music, with an electronica emphasis, but I love arranging, and I wanted an outlet where I could hone my skills while encouraging others to branch out and do the same. From the very beginning, the intent was to encourage games from all platforms, arranged in as many musical genres as possible. That's what made us different – that was the 'big idea.'

— David W. Lloyd (djpretzel), 3D World

The website's format was derived from Commodore 64 arrangement website C64Audio.com, then a host for many fan arrangements; Lloyd chose to have OverClocked ReMix expand the focus to all games regardless of game system. Originally coded in basic HTML and sporting an orange color scheme, and located at remix.overclocked.org, a subdomain of Lloyd's webcomic, the site underwent several visual redesigns before moving to www.ocremix.org in July 2003 and its present design in 2004. Initially the site was hosted by ZTNet and run directly by Lloyd; in 2006, it became self-sufficient and moved to dedicated hosting, and, in 2007, Lloyd registered OverClocked ReMix as a limited liability company.

At its founding, music submissions to the site were evaluated for inclusion solely by Lloyd, who required that all arrangements both meet his quality bar and also feature an original interpretation of the music, rather than minimally changing the original track. In early 2002, however, to better accommodate the volume of music submissions and improve selection consistency, Lloyd instituted a panel of judges, composed of accomplished artists and contributors to the community, to assist him in music selection, though he still provided an initial evaluation of all submissions for meeting a minimum quality bar. Judge Larry Oji (a.k.a. Liontamer) became head submissions evaluator for the organization in June 2006, taking over the majority of Lloyd's evaluation work and freeing him to focus on the site and company itself.

== Main features ==
OverClocked ReMix's primary focus is hosting and distributing video game music arrangements. The site hosts more than 5,000 "ReMixes" from a variety of genres, submitted by more than 1,800 "ReMixers". ReMixes are available for individual download and through bundled BitTorrent distributions, and are searchable through a database of games, composers, companies, systems, and ReMixers. ReMixes are released under a non-commercial, attribution-requiring content policy.

ReMixes are added to the site after being submitted by their creators and passed by a panel of judges based on standards and guidelines encouraging arrangement creativity and high production quality. Since the site's founding, more than 150 works have been removed after initially being admitted, generally due to stricter enforcement of the site's standards after the admission of the work. To meet the inclusion standards, works must demonstrate significant arrangement work rather than being a "MIDI rip", a term used for works which take a transcription of the source material and make only minor modifications to it. Other barriers to inclusion include stolen or unoriginal recordings, cover versions that change the performance but not the music itself, arrangements which differ so far from the source material as to be unrecognizable, and obvious sub-par execution. The site also maintains a database of the skills of members of its community to encourage artist collaboration. Lloyd and other staff also conduct interviews with prolific ReMixers, video game music composers, and celebrities about video game music creation.

=== Albums ===
In addition to the individual ReMixes, OC ReMix also hosts albums of arrangements and original music. These albums are typically created as collaborations among groups of ReMixers; OC ReMix has released over 150 albums. The majority of these are albums of arrangements, though it also hosts and distributes original soundtrack albums for indie games. These albums are released for free, and are generally created by members of the ReMix community. Titles include the iOS game Trenches, the Xbox Live Arcade game Return All Robots!, and Missile Master, Episode 1: Invasion.

In 2008, the musicians of OverClocked ReMix were chosen to handle the Super Street Fighter II Turbo HD Remix soundtrack after Capcom U.S.A. associate producer Rey Jimenez heard the site's 2006 Super Street Fighter II Turbo tribute album Blood on the Asphalt. Entitled OC ReMix: Super Street Fighter II Turbo HD Remix Official Soundtrack, the complete 66-track album was freely released at OverClocked ReMix. The album includes new arrangements, edited versions of Blood on the Asphalt tracks, and other prior remixes from the site. The remixers arranged the music based on knowledge of the Street Fighter II series alone, as the music for the game was completed before the visuals and gameplay. OC ReMix founder David "djpretzel" Lloyd directed the soundtrack and served as the organization's contact with Capcom "to ensure that working with a large fan community was as close as possible for Capcom to working with a single composer". Jimenez praised HD Remix's music as "above and beyond our expectations" and OC ReMix's efforts as "one of the most rewarding aspects of working on SF HD Remix". Capcom's then-Vice-President of Strategic Planning & Business Development, Christian Svensson, described the soundtrack as "impactful" and claimed in an interview that in demos of the game the remixed music was praised before any other aspect. In its review of HD Remix, IGN commended OC ReMix's work as "a great tribute to the original soundtrack". Other entities with favorable reviews of the soundtrack include Eurogamer, GameSpot, Official Xbox Magazine, and GamesRadar, as well as long-time game composer "The Fat Man" George Sanger, who referred to the Capcom-OC ReMix collaboration as "Game Audio 2.0".

In addition to its free albums, the site partnered with Capcom in 2013 to release OC ReMix's first commercial album, For Everlasting Peace: 25 Years of Mega Man, featuring licensed arrangements of various Mega Man soundtracks. In 2014, OverClocked ReMix expanded its publishing wing into an associated record label, OverClocked Records, through which it sells licensed songs and albums. In July 2015, the label published its first officially licensed remix, an arrangement of "Song of the Ancients" from Nier for streaming or purchase.

The community of OverClocked ReMix create their own unofficial albums, including the long-running An OverClocked Christmas album series since 2007. Other annual projects include An OverClocked Halloween and An OverClocked Fishmas.

== Reception ==
According to Lloyd, OC ReMix has grown steadily over the years, in terms of both visitors and submissions. Influxes of new visitors happened whenever a piece about the site was published on a news site such as Slashdot and Electronic Gaming Monthly. The site has been covered by sites such as Electronic Gaming Monthly, G4techTV, PC Gamer magazine, 1UP.com, Game Informer, Ars Technica, Minnesota Public Radio, Hyper magazine, and others. OC ReMix does not advertise or market itself, though OverClocked ReMix makes appearances at fan conventions; its first was Otakon 2006 in Baltimore, Maryland. In April 2008, Lloyd and Oji joined Six Apart's Anil Dash, MetaFilter's Matt Haughey, Reddit's Alexis Ohanian and Fark's Drew Curtis for a panel discussion on virtual communities at Internet meme convention, ROFLCon, co-sponsored by Harvard University and the Massachusetts Institute of Technology. Beginning in 2008, OC ReMix promotional CDs have been given away as contest prizes at every performance of orchestral game music concert series, Video Games Live at the invitation of composer and series co-creator Tommy Tallarico; ReMixes were played in the concert hall before the show at the June 29 and June 30, 2007 Kennedy Center performances in Washington, D.C.

According to a 2005 interview, the organization has never received negative feedback from a game composer or game publisher, and Lloyd stated, "Like all communities surrounding fan works, we're out, first and foremost, to honor that which we love, and I think the concept and goals have been well received all around." Several professional video game composers have positively commented about OC ReMix, such as Tommy Tallarico, Jeremy Soule, George "The Fat Man" Sanger, Hiroki Kikuta, Alexander Brandon, Barry Leitch, Nicholas Varley, and David Wise. OverClocked ReMix has also been praised for its work by non-composer industry figures including Doom lead designer John Romero and Contra 4 associate producer Tomm Hulett, who stated he hoped the game's music, scored by Jake "virt" Kaufman, would be arranged for OC ReMix in the future.

I just wanted to let you know that I support what you're doing with game music. [I completed this] in both your honor and Nobuo Uematsu's.

— Jeremy Soule to David W. Lloyd (djpretzel), upon submitting Final Fantasy VI "Squaresoft Variation" to OverClocked ReMix

In addition to praising OC ReMix and the works on it, some professional game composers have submitted their own ReMixes to the site. The first was in late 2002 by George Sanger, "Fat Dance", remixing his own composition from The 7th Guest. In early 2004, this was followed by a second ReMix of its kind, "Squaresoft Variation" (Final Fantasy VI) by Jeremy Soule, who dedicated the arrangement to both OC ReMix founder David W. Lloyd and Final Fantasy series composer Nobuo Uematsu. In 2005, Sanger provided another ReMix of his own work performed alongside Team Fat colleagues and game composers Dave Govett, Joe McDermott and K. Weston Phelan, entitled "Wing Theme Surf" (Wing Commander). Composer Tommy Tallarico released Earthworm Jim Anthology, an album of music from the Earthworm Jim series, in 2006, which includes tracks originally submitted to OC ReMix by other arrangers. In October 2009, composer Alexander Brandon and ReMixer Jimmy "Big Giant Circles" Hinson collaborated to arrange a track Brandon composed for the game Deus Ex, which was expanded in 2013 into an eight-track album collaboration between OC ReMix and Brandon. In March 2010, OC ReMix released its Donkey Kong Country 2 ReMix album, Serious Monkey Business, featuring a closing track performed by the game's original composer, David Wise, alongside Grant Kirkhope and Robin Beanland, three composers with ties to Rare's Donkey Kong Country/Land franchise.

Several amateur OC ReMix submitters and community members have transitioned into professional video game composition careers. These include Dain "Beatdrop" Olsen (Dance Dance Revolution SuperNOVA 2), Jillian "pixietricks" Aversa (Civilization IV: Beyond the Sword), Zircon (Monkey Island 2 Special Edition: LeChuck's Revenge), Christopher "Mazedude" Getman (The 7th Guest: Infection), Jimmy "Big Giant Circles" Hinson (Mass Effect 2), Jake "virt" Kaufman (Shovel Knight), and Danny Baranowsky (Super Meat Boy).
