= Puzzle Strike: Bag of Chips =

Board game

- Designers: David Sirlin
- Publishers: Sirlin Games
- Players: 2 to 4
- Playing time: ~20 minutes
- Chance: Medium
- Age range: 8 and up
- Skills: Resource management

Puzzle Strike: Bag of Chips (often shortened to Puzzle Strike) is a designer dedicated deck card game created by David Sirlin, inspired by Dominion and Super Puzzle Fighter II Turbo. It features asymmetric gameplay, and uses specially printed chips in place of cards.

== Gameplay ==
The objective of Puzzle Strike is similar to that of competitive puzzle games like Tetris or Puzzle Fighter. All players have a gradually increasing pile of gem chips, and the game ends when one player concludes their turn with too many gems in their pile. The goal is to have the emptiest pile when any other player tops out.

In addition to a gem pile, each player has a bag of chips, which they treat like a deck of cards - chips are drawn from the bag one at a time to form a player's hand and, when empty, the bag gets replenished from the player's discard pile. Over the course of the game, a player's bag can contain many different sorts of chips:

- Gems, which exist in four different values, can be played from the hand during the Buy phase to add new chips to the player's discard, to be cycled back into the bag.
- Combines replace two gem chips in one's gem pile with a single gem chip of the combined value.
- Crash Gems remove one or two gem chips from the player's gem pile, and sends an equivalent number of single gems to an opponent.
- Puzzle chips can perform a number of different actions, as specified on the chips themselves. Any given game of Puzzle Strike will be played with a set of ten varieties of puzzle chip, out of the twenty four included with the game.
- Character chips are similar to Puzzle chips, but are unique and cannot be bought. Each player's initial bag contains the three Character chips of their chosen character.
- Wounds serve no purpose but to slow down the player, by being a worthless card in their hand.

Every non-gem chip has a banner-color which helps categorize it, and may have certain symbols on the banner, such as a red fist to indicate an Attack (played to put other players at a disadvantage), or a colored shield to indicate a Reaction (which can be played out-of-turn in certain conditions).

Each turn, the player performs the following phases:

- Ante phase: The player adds a gem chip from the bank to their gem pile. The value of the chip is usually 1, but certain conditions may change that.
- Action phase: The player starts with one action, with which to play any single Puzzle, Character, Crash or Combine chip from their hand. Certain chips may also allow the player to play further chips, though they may place a limitation on the banner-color of the chip to be played.
- Buy phase: The player must buy at least one additional chip for their deck from the bank, by playing sufficient gems from their hand to meet the cost. If the player cannot afford any other chip, they are forced to buy a Wound.
- Cleanup phase: All chips from the hand and in play are discarded, and a new hand of chips is drawn. The number of chips drawn depends on the size of the player's gem pile.

The game ends when one player ends their turn with more than nine gems in their gem pile, at which point victory goes to the player with the smallest gem pile.

== Expansion ==
Puzzle Strike: Shadows is a stand-alone expansion for the game, providing ten new characters (previously featured in the second edition of Flash Duel), and twenty four all new puzzle chips. It was initially funded, along with a third edition of the original game, through a Kickstarter campaign.

== Promotional chips ==
Three additional puzzle chips have been created for the game. They were originally included with the Puzzle Strike Upgrade Pack.

- Combinatorics
- Custom Combo
- Dashing Strike

== Puzzle Strike Online ==
- Play Puzzle Strike online at FantasyStrike.com, against human opponents or practice against AI-controlled opponents.

== Awards and honors ==
- 2010 Fortress Ameritrash's Game of the Year
- 2012 Board Game Strategies’ 2012 Strategy Game of the Year
- 2012 Tycho Brahe's Game of the Year
