= Fantasy Strike =

- Developer: Sirlin Games
- Publisher: Sirlin Games
- Engine: Unity
- Platforms: Linux macOS; Microsoft Windows; Nintendo Switch; PlayStation 4
- Release: July 25, 2019
- Genre: Fighting
- Modes: Single-player, multiplayer

Fantasy Strike is a 2019 free-to-play fighting video game with an emphasis on accessibility developed and published by Sirlin Games. It revolves around one-on-one battles that require fast reflexes. It is designed to streamline the fighting game genre in terms of learning, player-decisions and user-interface. The game was released on July 25, 2019, for Linux, macOS, Microsoft Windows, Nintendo Switch, PlayStation 4.

== Gameplay ==
Fantasy Strike is designed to reduce unnecessary complexity while maintaining the depth of traditional fighting games by removing redundant moves and motion inputs. This allows players to engage in the strategy without worrying about missed moves or dropped combos. It can played with just a stick and 3 buttons on any controller, but can optionally have dedicated buttons for every action including jump, throw, attacks, and special and super moves. Each player picks a character to play, which are then placed in an arena. By performing various attacks unique to the character, each player tries to bring down their opponents health pool down to zero to win a round. Players can block to defend against attacks and break through blocks by using throws. A unique feature to Fantasy Strike is the "Yomi Counter", which can be performed when not attacking by pressing no buttons at all. If the character is hit by an opponent's throw when yomi countering, they won't get hit and instead perform a counter throw and gain a full super meter, turning the tables.

The game features various modes. Single-player pits the player in matches against AI controlled opponents, with different modes putting a different spin on the formula. Arcade adds some story through artwork and dialog, as well as stronger version of the character Quince who serves as the final challenge. Survival provides a stream of progressively stronger opponents. Daily Challenge is similar to Survival, but can only be played once per day and compares the score between the players. Single Match allows a selection of any opponent and difficulty for a standard match. Boss Rush allows the player to choose a new power-up before each battle where they fight special opponents that also possess power-ups.

Multiplayer allows player-versus-player matches both locally and online. The latter provides automatic match-making for a casual and a ranked queue, or directly challenging specific opponents through friend matches. Players may either choose to play Standard or Team Battle. In a Standard Battle, each player picks a character and they play a game to the best of seven rounds. In a Team Battle, each player picks three characters which are pooled and randomly pit against each other to play games to the best of five rounds. After each game the winning and losing characters are removed from the pools. This continues until a player has won with all three of their characters, thus winning the match. If a player runs out of characters, their non-winning characters are returned to their pool. Team Battle is used in ranked play and proposed as the go-to mode for tournaments, as it is designed to alleviate the issue of counter-picking and provides far more matchup variety.

In addition to single-player and multi-player modes, there is also a tutorial, a learn section and a training mode. The tutorial teaches new players how to play the game in general, while the learn section contains character spotlight videos that explain each character's playstyle, tools, and gameplan in-depth. Training mode lets the player experiment and practice with characters, with features including dummy recording, dynamic frame data generation for moves, and frame step mode.

== Plot ==
The game is set in the world of the same name, "Fantasy Strike", featured in other games made by Sirlin Games. In the story, Rook hosts the Fantasy Strike tournament as an Olympic style event to rally the powerful fighters to talk about the injustices of their respective lands.

== Characters ==
The game features twelve different playable characters, categorized into four different groups: zoner, rushdown, grappler and wildcard.

Zoners: These characters specialize in using long-ranged attacks and projectiles to keep opponents away, force block damage, and punish bad approaches.

- Grave is standard "Shoto"-style character. He has a versatile tool kit but is content to wear down opponents with safe pokes, block damage, and reliable anti-air attacks. He is inspired by Ryu from the Street Fighter series.
- Jaina is a traditional zoner who can put many projectiles on the screen at once. She uses some potentially risky (even self-damaging) moves to forcefully maintain control. She is inspired by Sagat from the Street Fighter series.
- Argagarg is an extreme zoner with poor mobility and initial damage output, but long range or high priority attacks and excellent defense. He can poison opponents then layer attacks to create short lockdown sequences. He is inspired by Dhalsim and F.A.N.G. from the Street Fighter series.
- Geiger is a pure zoner and remix of a charge character. His best moves briefly become unavailable whenever the player uses a forward input. He is inspired by Guile from the Street Fighter series.

Rushdown: These characters specialize in fast movement, tricky approaches, and mix-ups that lead to huge combos or wear down opponents even when blocked. However, they have low health.

- Valerie is a medium range rushdown that excels at pokes and block damage. She is possibly inspired by Millia Rage from the Guilty Gear series.
- Setsuki is a close range ninja with a myriad of attack options including differently angled attacks and special throws. She is inspired by Ibuki from the Street Fighter series.

Grapplers: These characters struggle to approach opponents, but in exchange they have more health and terrifying (possibly multi-layered) mix-ups when they get in.

- Midori is a fundamental character with good defense and a literal "dragon install". His super meter takes longer to charge but allows him to transform into a separate, much stronger dragon character for a limited time. He has a parry that fills his super meter and gives him a special throw stance. He is inspired by E. Honda and possibly Gen, both from the Street Fighter series.
- Rook is a stone golem with tools to help him get in and eventually trap opponents in a vortex of unfavorable guessing games. He is inspired by characters like Zangief from the Street Fighter series and Potemkin from the Guilty Gear series.

Wild Card: These characters have gimmicks, using certain themes for their character design and their moves. For example, Quince is a politician, so he uses illusions to trick the opponent for his own advantage.

- Lum is a gambling panda who pressures the opponent by finding opportunities to throw random items that usually favor him or create chaos. He is inspired by Faust from the Guilty Gear series.
- Onimaru is a sword character who is slow but can pressure opponents with massive range and damage potential. He can armor through opponent's attacks to create favorable trades and set up guard crushes with sword strikes.
- Quince is a politician who confuses the opponent with illusion-based mix-ups and uses mirrors to slow down opponents or reflect projectiles. "Two Truths" mode makes all his illusions real, so his power level briefly skyrockets.
- DeGrey is a lawyer who creates frame traps and tries to catch opponents' mistakes. Successfully counter hitting opponents (striking them during the startup of their attacks) leads to dramatic, devastating combos. He is inspired by Slayer from the Guilty Gear series.

== Reception ==
Reception

Aggregate scores
Aggregator	Score
Metacritic	76/100
OpenCritic	68% recommend

Review scores
Publication	Score
Edge	7/10
IGN	8/10
Nintendo Life	8/10
Nintendo World Report	8.5/10
Screen Rant	3.5/5

Fantasy Strike received "generally favorable reviews", according to the review aggregation website Metacritic. Fellow review aggregator OpenCritic assessed that the game received strong approval, being recommended by 68% of critics.

Many reviewers praised the game's accessibility by virtue of the relative ease of execution, while retaining the depth that makes fighting games difficult to master and fun. Farrell from PC Invasion stated that "the game is purely skill-based, as every good fighter game is." There was some concern regarding its simplistic nature and limited movesets. With ten characters, some noted that Fantasy Strike's roster was relatively small. By contrast, others noted how those few characters were highly distinct and offered unique experiences. The game's accessibility was also cited as a strength.

Martinez from Gaming Illustrated wrote, "Utilizing both videos and tutorials helps you deepen your understanding of surface and high level play and the underlying mechanics." Furthermore, reviewers commented on how the clean visuals and various UI Hints (such as color-coded moves and "Jumpable" text) increased clarity in its visuals. Reviewers also agreed that its rollback based netcode made for a solid online experience.

Reviewers were divided on the game's visual style. PC Invasion, among other outlets, claimed, "The visuals and aesthetics are mostly bland", ascribing the game a typical style that is not distinct enough to set itself apart. On the other hand, some highlighted the game as something that is pleasing to look at.

Reviewers also expressed their dissatisfaction with some of the single-player modes. Jones from Heavy said, "While there's a lot of modes on display here, not all of them are fully featured and worth returning to." O'Reilly from Nintendo Life complained that the "arcade mode is a little barebones". In contrast, the single player-mode boss rush was cited as a highlight.

== See also ==
- Yomi (card game)
