= Super Street Fighter II Turbo HD Remix =

2008 video game

- Developer: Backbone Entertainment
- Publisher: Capcom
- Producers: Rey Jimenez (Publisher), Ardry Engleheart (Developer)
- Designer: David Sirlin
- Artist: UDON Entertainment
- Composer: OverClocked Remix
- Series: Street Fighter
- Platforms: PlayStation 3, Xbox 360
- Release: PlayStation 3: NA: November 25, 2008; PAL: February 19, 2009; Xbox 360: WW: November 26, 2008
- Genre: Fighting
- Modes: Single-player, multiplayer

Super Street Fighter II Turbo HD Remix is a 2008 fighting game initially released on the PlayStation Store and Xbox Live Arcade services. A physical copy of the game was later released as part of Capcom Digital Collection. It is a remake of 1994's Super Street Fighter II Turbo (the fifth arcade iteration of the Street Fighter II series) featuring the original game and a high definition version using graphics drawn by UDON Entertainment, and arranged music by OverClocked ReMix members. The game was designed by Backbone Entertainment's David Sirlin to be the sixth definitive version of Street Fighter II, although it is in fact the seventh, being released after 2003's Hyper Street Fighter II.

== Gameplay ==
Super Street Fighter II Turbo HD Remix features the same roster of characters as Super Street Fighter II Turbo, and two single-player gameplay modes: Classic and HD Remix. Multiplayer gameplay modes include Local Multiplayer, Player Match and Ranked Match, along with online tournaments. Other notable features included in the game include a hit box display in training mode, to show players where their moves affect their opponent. Another is the inclusion of Quarter Match mode, allowing players to spectate and instantly join online match lobbies, simulating an arcade environment.

Also included are online match rankings and leaderboards arranged by game modes, and each sub-arranged by overall rankings, the player's own score, and their score compared to their friends'. The game also includes an optional 16:9 video mode.

The 224 pixel sprites and backgrounds in the original Super Street Fighter II Turbo were replaced by digital artwork drawn by UDON Entertainment, allowing HD Remix to make the most use of high definition (and therefore widescreen) displays (but the game can be changed to the original sprites as an option). Remixed music was also in development, later revealed to be handled by video game music website OverClocked ReMix.

== Development ==
Ken in Super Street Fighter II upscaled via bilinear interpolation (left) and an early prototype of Super Street Fighter II Turbo HD Remix version (right)

David Sirlin, producer of Backbone's Capcom Classics Collection, suggested a number of projects to Capcom during the compilation's development, including redrawn versions of Puzzle Fighter and Street Fighter II. While it is unknown whether these suggestions influenced Capcom to develop both games, Sirlin took the helm of development when both were approved. In an interview with TeamXbox, Capcom's senior director of strategic planning and research Christian Svensson revealed that fans on the company's forums had asked for a high definition Street Fighter game, an "overwhelming request".

HD Remix is a heavily modified port of Super Street Fighter II X for Matching Service, a Dreamcast version of Super Turbo released only in Japan that featured an online versus mode. Acting as design director, Sirlin's role included balance changes to gameplay and correcting differences between the original arcade version of the game and the HD Classic Arcade mode. Other tasks included monitoring speed differences between versions and the addition of new features. However, an HD version of the arcade version's intro sequence had to be cut from the final game to keep its online release small.

Several of the backgrounds had details of their setting changed, such as mopeds being used in China instead of pushbikes, and the Taj Mahal being visible in India. In Balrog's stage, the Golden Nugget casino has been replaced with the fictional Crazy Buffalo.

=== Music ===
The artists of the video game music tribute website OverClocked ReMix were chosen to handle the remixed soundtrack for HD Remix after Capcom associate producer Rey Jimenez heard the organization's 2006 Super Street Fighter II Turbo tribute album Blood on the Asphalt. OC ReMix founder David "djpretzel" Lloyd directed the soundtrack and served as the organization's contact with Capcom "to ensure that working with a large fan community was as close as possible for Capcom to working with a single composer."

Entitled OC ReMix: Super Street Fighter II Turbo HD Remix Official Soundtrack, the complete 66-track album was freely released at OverClocked ReMix on November 27, 2008. Along with several new arrangements, edited versions of Blood on the Asphalt tracks and OC ReMixes comprise the soundtrack. OC ReMix's musicians arranged the music based on knowledge of the original Super Street Fighter II Turbo, not requiring access to visuals or gameplay.

Jimenez praised HD Remix's music as "above and beyond our expectations" and OC ReMix's efforts as "one of the most rewarding aspects of working on SF HD Remix". Capcom's Vice-President of Strategic Planning & Business Development, Christian Svensson, described the soundtrack as "impactful" after guests, to whom he showed a demo of the game, praised the remixed music before any other aspect of the demo. In its review of HD Remix, gaming & entertainment website IGN commended OC ReMix's work as "a great tribute to the original soundtrack". Other entities with favorable reviews of the soundtrack included Eurogamer, GameSpot, Official Xbox Magazine, GamesRadar, 1UP.com, as well as long-time game composer "The Fat Man" George Sanger, who referred to the Capcom-OC ReMix collaboration as "Game Audio 2.0".

Coinciding with the game's PlayStation Network launch, the PSN-exclusive album Street Fighter Underground Remix was also released, made up of five rap remixes featuring artists Hieroglyphics, Redman, Oh No, DJ Toure, Mistah F.A.B., DJ Qbert, and Zion I. Each track samples from various Street Fighter franchise media, including HD Remix.

== Release ==
An open beta version of the game, with Ken and Ryu as playable characters and a single environment available to fight in, was released on June 25, 2008, and was set to run for eight weeks. After finding and fixing issues in the beta, a patch was released and the beta was extended to September 5, 2008. Players wishing to participate had to purchase the Xbox Live Arcade version of Wolf of the Battlefield: Commando 3. The purpose of the beta was to test the network code behind online play. It was no longer available for download after November 25, 2008. The performance of Street Fighter II Hyper Fighting online was "sometimes-sluggish", according to GameSpot's staff, who suggested the beta test was Capcom's attempt to avoid the situation occurring again.

Super Street Fighter II Turbo HD Remix was released for PlayStation 3 in North America on November 25, 2008. The Xbox 360 version was released the following day. The game was released in Europe on February 19, 2009. Meanwhile, this version was not released in Japan, although it uses Japanese audio in the game.

== Reception ==
Reception

Aggregate score
Aggregator	Score
Metacritic	PS3: 87/100; X360: 88/100

Review scores
Publication	Score
1Up.com	A+
Eurogamer	8/10
GamePro	4.5/5
GameRevolution	B+
GameSpot	8.5/10
GamesRadar+	10/10
Giant Bomb	5/5
IGN	8.7/10
Official Xbox Magazine (US)	9.0/10
TeamXbox	9/10
VideoGamer.com	9/10

GamesRadar gave the game 10/10, citing it as essential for anyone with an appreciation for fighting games. IGN awarded the game 8.7 and an Editor's Choice award, praising its balanced and deep gameplay, but criticizing its lack of modes. PlayStation: The Official Magazine declared, "as it sounds, this is quite possibly the best all-around version of one of the most important (and fun!) fighting games of all time. Everyone should play a little Street Fighter at some point, and this is an excellent way to experience it." IGN editor Cam Shea ranked it sixth on his top 10 list of Xbox Live Arcade games. He stated that any self-respecting Street Fighter fan would start drooling after seeing this, praising its high definition visuals. He added that while it was lacking in game modes, the online functionality is good.

During the 12th Annual Interactive Achievement Awards, the Academy of Interactive Arts & Sciences nominated Turbo HD Remix for "Fighting Game of the Year".

Despite not being released for the European PSN until February 2009, the title had a quarter of a million paid downloads within a month. It had broken both first-day and first-week sales for a download-only title.
