= Capcom Fighting Collection 2 =

2025 video game compilation

- Developer: Capcom
- Publisher: Capcom
- Producer: Shuhei Matsumoto
- Series: Street Fighter; SNK vs. Capcom; Power Stone
- Engine: MT Framework
- Platforms: Nintendo Switch; PlayStation 4; Windows; Xbox One
- Release: May 16, 2025
- Genre: Fighting
- Modes: Single-player, multiplayer

Capcom Fighting Collection 2 is a 2025 fighting game compilation developed and published by Capcom. It is the third entry in Capcom's Fighting Collection lineup and a direct sequel to the original Capcom Fighting Collection (2022), comprising various Capcom fighting games released between 1998 and 2004. It was released for Nintendo Switch, PlayStation 4, Windows, and Xbox One in May 2025.

The game lineup notably includes the Capcom-developed entries in the SNK vs. Capcom series, Capcom vs. SNK: Millennium Fight 2000 and its 2001 sequel Capcom vs. SNK 2: Mark of the Millennium 2001. In addition, the compilation comprises early 3D Capcom fighting games Plasma Sword: Nightmare of Bilstein (1998), Power Stone (1999), Power Stone 2, and Project Justice (both 2000), as well as the enhanced 2001 release Street Fighter Alpha 3 Upper and the crossover fighting game Capcom Fighting Evolution (2004). Every game supports online ranked and casual play with rollback netcode, leaderboards, training and spectating modes, and a viewable gallery with other in-game extras.

== Gameplay ==
Included games
1998	Plasma Sword: Nightmare of Bilstein
1999	Power Stone
2000	Power Stone 2
2000	Capcom vs. SNK: Millennium Fight 2000 Pro
2000	Project Justice
2001	Street Fighter Alpha 3 Upper
2001	Capcom vs. SNK 2: Mark of the Millennium 2001
2002
2003
2004	Capcom Fighting Evolution

Capcom Fighting Collection 2 is a compilation of eight arcade fighting games developed and published by Capcom. More specifically, it comprises ports of four 2D Capcom titles and four of the earliest 3D fighting games released by the developer. The collection is notable for including the first re-releases of the external crossover fighting games Capcom vs. SNK: Millennium Fight 2000 and Capcom vs. SNK 2: Mark of the Millennium 2001, as well as the intercompany crossover Capcom Fighting Evolution, which spanned Capcom's various fighting and beat 'em up game franchises. It also includes Street Fighter Alpha 3 Upper, an enhanced re-release of the game that incorporated the additional characters featured in the game's home console ports, marking the first time the original arcade version of Upper has been made available outside Japan. Fighting Collection 2 includes Power Stone (1999) and its sequel Power Stone 2 (2000), as well as the Star Wars-inspired weapons-based fighter Plasma Sword: Nightmare of Bilstein (1998), the sequel to Star Gladiator (1996), and the high school-themed team-based fighting game Project Justice (2000), the sequel to Rival Schools: United by Fate (1997).

As with both Capcom Fighting Collection and Marvel vs. Capcom Fighting Collection: Arcade Classics, Capcom Fighting Collection 2 supports online casual, ranked and lobby play for every title included, as well as a high-score based mode with leaderboards. In addition, it features training modes with input displays, as well as viewable hitboxes for the 2D fighting games, and the ability to display each game's marquee card for info on controls, as well as toggles for playable secret characters, one-button super moves, and difficulty setting in offline modes, along with an arranged soundtrack and re-recorded sound effects, known as the "Ver. 2K25" sound style, for Capcom vs. SNK 2 (with Bill Butts, the collection's system voice, replacing DJ Hiroaki Asai as the game's system voice when the "Ver. 2K25" sound style is selected), Power Stone 2 and Project Justice. A variety of filters for adjusting each game's presentation are also available to alter the way in which in-game graphics are displayed. An in-game gallery accessible from the collection's main menu presents further in-game extras including an art gallery with concept and character art scans and a music player with the official soundtracks to each featured game.

A subsequent update for the collection in August 2025 restored the combo routes in the training modes for Plasma Sword and Power Stone 2, and added numerous toggles to Alpha 3 Upper's EX Settings, namely an Additional Characters option which enables Ingrid, Maki, Yun and Eagle as playable fighters, giving Alpha 3 Upper roster parity with Street Fighter Alpha 3 MAX, the final revision of the game for the PlayStation Portable (PSP). A Mode Select option was also added to EX Settings, enabling the additional "MAZI", "SAIKYO" and "CLASSIC" fight styles to be chosen from the character select screen as with the Dreamcast and MAX versions. The additional modes and characters cannot be used in any capacity during online play.

== Development ==
When being interviewed by IGN in July 2024 during that year's Evolution Championship Series (EVO) fighting game tournament, Capcom fighting game producer Shuhei Matsumoto was inquired on further releases of their legacy fighting games on modern platforms following the launch of Capcom Fighting Collection in 2022 and the announcement of Marvel vs. Capcom Fighting Collection: Arcade Classics, which was ultimately released in 2024. Matsumoto expressed a desire to release as much of Capcom's legacy catalogue in the fighting game genre on modern platforms as a means to "reach as many people who may have never had the opportunity to play these games back in the day." During EVO 2024, Capcom also debuted footage of SNK character Terry Bogard, who was joining Street Fighter 6 (2023) as a downloadable content (DLC) guest fighter alongside Fatal Fury character Mai Shiranui at a later date in exchange for Ken Masters and Chun-Li's guest inclusions as DLCs in Fatal Fury: City of the Wolves (2025), while SNK separately announced and released a high definition (HD) port of SNK vs. Capcom: SVC Chaos (2003), the third and last major entry in the titular series. Both developments began speculation regarding a potential re-release for the two Capcom-developed Capcom vs. SNK titles that immediately preceded SVC Chaos in the future, which Matsumoto indirectly implied as a possibility when reiterating his desire to work with SNK on future collaborations using their characters, suggesting that reintroducing the classic titles to new fans would be a step towards producing new games with external license holders.

Capcom Fighting Collection 2 was officially announced on August 27, 2024, during a Nintendo Direct Partner Showcase presentation as the direct follow up to the original Capcom Fighting Collection, alongside launch details for the incoming Marvel vs. Capcom Fighting Collection. The compilation was confirmed to be headlined by the inclusion of both Capcom vs. SNK: Millennium Fight 2000 and Capcom vs. SNK 2 (2001), while also collecting various other Capcom fighting games released between the late 1990s and early 2000s, including the earlier 3D fighting games Plasma Sword: Nightmare of Bilstein (1998), Power Stone (1999), Power Stone 2 and Project Justice (both 2000), the first and the latter being sequels to Star Gladiator (1996) and Rival Schools: United by Fate (1997), respectively; Fighting Collection 2 also includes the enhanced Street Fighter Alpha 3 Upper (2001), and the first ever re-release of the crossover fighter Capcom Fighting Evolution (2004). In September 2024, a version for Xbox One was officially announced by Capcom, which had secured support from Microsoft to develop the game for the console after "technical discussions" between the two firms, after the compilation was initially not slated to release for the platform as with Marvel vs. Capcom Fighting Collection.

== Release ==
Capcom Fighting Collection 2 was released for Nintendo Switch, PlayStation 4, Windows and Xbox One on May 16, 2025. A physical version is distributed for Nintendo Switch and PlayStation 4 as with the Marvel vs. Capcom Fighting Collection: Arcade Classics compilation, which is bundled with an exclusive comic book featuring art produced by Udon Entertainment for all pre-ordered copies. Two additional remixes for the gallery were also available as a pre-order bonus for all versions of the game. A post-launch update on August 7 added new artwork and music, additional training mode features for Plasma Sword, and the four additional Street Fighter Alpha 3 characters from the game's PlayStation Portable version.

== Reception ==
Reception

Aggregate scores
Aggregator	Score
Metacritic	(NS) 83/100 (PC) 83/100 (PS4) 81/100 (XONE) 83/100
OpenCritic	97% recommend

Review scores
Publication	Score
GameSpot	8/10
Hardcore Gamer	4/5
Nintendo Life	9/10
Nintendo World Report	8/10
Push Square	9/10
Shacknews	9/10

Capcom Fighting Collection 2 received "generally favorable" reviews from critics, according to review aggregator website Metacritic. Fellow review aggregator OpenCritic assessed that the game received "mighty" approval, being recommended by 97% of critics.

The game was nominated for "Best Fighting Game" at The Game Awards 2025, and for "Fighting Game of the Year" at the 29th Annual D.I.C.E. Awards.
