= Power Stone =

Power Stone may refer to:

- Power Stone (video game), a 1999 video game
  - Power Stone (TV series), a Japanese anime television series based on the video game
  - Power Stone 2, a 2000 video game
- Power Stone (Marvel Cinematic Universe), a fictional item in the Marvel Cinematic Universe
