= Capcom Fighting All-Stars =

Capcom Fighting All-Stars: Code Holder
- Developer: Capcom
- Publisher: Capcom
- Director: Toyohisa Tanabe
- Platforms: PlayStation 2, arcade
- Release: Unreleased
- Genre: Fighting
- Modes: Single-player, multiplayer

Capcom Fighting All-Stars: Code Holder (Note: Japanese: カプコンファイティングオールスターズ) is a cancelled 3D fighting game developed by Capcom for arcade and PlayStation 2. The game would have featured characters from various Capcom franchises fighting to prevent a massive bomb from exploding. The project initially began development as a third entry in the Capcom vs. SNK series. It was canceled in 2003 due to poor feedback during its testing period, though it would influence the release of Capcom Fighting Evolution the following year.

== Gameplay ==
Capcom Fighting All-Stars was designed to translate mechanics from Capcom's 2D fighting games into a 3D environment, similar to their Street Fighter EX series. The game was controlled using five buttons: two for punches, two for kicks, and one to dodge by sidestepping. Characters had three life bars that would cause a brief pause each time one was depleted, similar to the Darkstalkers series. Some standard moves could be used to deflect opponents' attacks. Similar to Rival Schools, characters could perform a "Dramatic Counter" by attacking opponents after evading at the precise moment of an opponent's attack. While on their character's first life bar, players would only be able to gain up to one of their super meter's three tiers, preventing them from using more than their most basic super attack. Each time one of a character's life bars was depleted, the next tier of their super meter would unlock, allowing them to gain more meter and use more powerful super attacks. A special taunt called a "Declaration of Victory" could be performed at the start of a match; this would grant the player a score bonus and allow them to perform a finishing move if successful, at the cost of reducing their life bars to one.

=== Characters ===
Capcom Fighting All-Stars was intended to feature 16 playable characters, consisting of eleven characters from other Capcom franchises such as Street Fighter and Final Fight, along with four original characters and one guest character from SNK's The King of Fighters franchise.

- Akira (Rival Schools)
- Akuma (Street Fighter)
- Alex (Street Fighter)
- Batsu (Rival Schools)
- Chun-Li (Street Fighter)
- D.D. (original)
- Death (original)
- Demitri (Darkstalkers)
- Haggar (Final Fight)
- Ingrid (original)
- K' (The King of Fighters)
- Nash (Street Fighter)
- Poison (Final Fight)
- Rook (Note: The character's name is alternately romanized as "Rook" and "Luke" in different sources and media; the character is referred to here as "Rook" to distinguish him from the later Street Fighter character Luke Sullivan.) (original)
- Ryu (Street Fighter)
- Strider Hiryu (Strider)

== Story ==
A terrorist named Avel, under the code name "Death", threatens to destroy Metro City using a small atomic bomb known as "Laughter Sun". To prevent anyone from stopping the bomb, Death locks the disarm function behind a set of codes. Each of these codes are held by the eponymous "Code Holders", humans with special powers: D.D. ("Ogre"), Rook ("Fallen Angel"), and Ingrid ("Isis"). Faced with this crisis, Metro City Mayor Mike Haggar contacts several other fighters for help, and orders them to retrieve the codes, defeat Death, and prevent Metro City's destruction. The story had a time limit, depicted as the bomb's detonation timer, and the player would achieve one of multiple endings based on how quickly they finished the game.

== Development ==
Following the release of Capcom vs. SNK 2 (2001), Capcom began work on a third entry in the Capcom vs. SNK series for arcades and PlayStation 2. While originally planned as Capcom's final 2D fighting game, the decision was made to change it to a 3D fighting game instead. However, the game was cancelled due to SNK facing bankruptcy at the time. As a result of changes brought on by SNK's financial situation, a team of roughly 20 staff members left the company to join Capcom, including director Toyohisa Tanabe. This team decided to repurpose the assets created for Capcom vs. SNK 3 into a new project, which became Capcom Fighting All-Stars. The game was built on Namco's System 246 arcade hardware, the capabilities of which were comparable to the PlayStation 2. The presence of several of their former staff on the team led SNK to grant Capcom permission to feature one of their characters, K', as a special guest.

Capcom Fighting All-Stars was first publicly announced in September 2002, and was playable at the Tokyo Game Show and Amusement Machine Show later that month. Between 2002–2003, Capcom held a series of limited location tests for the arcade version, where they received negative feedback from players. The arcade game was reported as cancelled in February 2003, though it was later clarified that development had not yet ceased. After several more months in development, the game was officially canceled in August 2003.

== Legacy ==
While Capcom Fighting All-Stars was never released, Capcom attempted to salvage the concept, leading to the creation of another Capcom crossover fighting game, Capcom Fighting Evolution (2004); one of Capcom Fighting All-Stars' original characters, Ingrid, was included in its roster. Ingrid would go on to reappear in other Capcom games, most notably as a playable character in Street Fighter Alpha 3 MAX (2006), Project X Zone 2 (2015), and Street Fighter 6 (2023), the latter of which makes several allusions to Capcom Fighting All-Stars. Ingrid, D.D. and Rook also made cameo appearances in the rhythm RPG Otoranger (2013).
