= Capcom Fighting Evolution =

2004 video game

- North American cover art for the home versions
- Developer: Capcom Production Studio 2
- Publisher: Capcom
- Director: Hidetoshi Ishizawa
- Producers: Yoshinori Ono; Hitomi Nishimoto; Hidetoshi Ishizawa; Kenji Itsuno
- Designers: Hidetoshi Ishizawa; Shinsuke Kodama
- Programmers: Yasunori Harada; Kazuhito Nakai
- Composer: Noriyuki Asakura
- Platforms: Arcade, PlayStation 2, Xbox
- Release: Arcade: JP: October 8, 2004; PlayStation 2: NA: November 16, 2004; JP: December 2, 2004; EU: February 11, 2005; Xbox: NA: June 14, 2005; JP: June 16, 2005; EU: June 24, 2005
- Genre: Fighting
- Modes: Single-player, multiplayer
- Arcade system: Namco System 246

Capcom Fighting Jam (Note: Japanese: カプコン ファイティング ジャム, Hepburn: Kapukon Faitingu Jamu), released in the US as Capcom Fighting Evolution, is a 2004 crossover fighting video game developed and published by Capcom. It was originally released for arcades on the Namco System 246 hardware and ported to the PlayStation 2 and Xbox. The game features characters from three different incarnations of the Street Fighter series, as well as characters from the Darkstalkers series and the CPS III arcade game Red Earth, with each character employing the fighting system from the game which they represent.

== Gameplay ==
Capcom Fighting Evolution features characters all taken from the rosters of Street Fighter II, Street Fighter Alpha 3, Street Fighter III: 3rd Strike, Darkstalkers 3, as well as the single game Red Earth. There are four selectable characters representing each series, excluding original character Ingrid and the boss characters Pyron and Shin Akuma. Each character uses a fighting system from the game which determines the techniques they can use and their super move gauge. Ingrid uses her unique fighting style with her own techniques, for a total of six fighting styles.

The game consists of two-on-two endurance-style matches similar to that of Rival Schools: United By Fate. The player selects a pair of character and then begins a match with one character. In the Japanese version of the game, if their current character is defeated for one round, then the next round will begin with the other character. In the North American version, the character can remain the same whether they win or lose.

In line with other original online-enabled games on the Xbox, multiplayer on Xbox Live was available to players until April 15, 2010. Capcom Fighting Evolution is currently playable online again on the revival Xbox Live servers called Insignia.

== Characters ==
=== Street Fighter II ===
The Street Fighter II characters follow the playing style of Super Street Fighter II Turbo. Each Street Fighter II character only has a single-level Super Combo gauge that allows them to perform a Super Combo at MAX level. They cannot air block nor dash like other characters, but can stand up quickly when they fall to the ground. Unlike Super Turbo, each character has two Super Combo moves. Despite representing Street Fighter II, the graphics for Ryu and Bison are actually from their Capcom vs. SNK incarnation, while Guile is from Street Fighter Alpha 3 and Zangief received a new sprite (edited from his Street Fighter Alpha one) just for this game.

- Ryu (originally from Street Fighter)
- Guile
- M. Bison (Vega in Japan)
- Zangief

=== Darkstalkers ===
The Darkstalkers characters have a three-level "Special Stock" gauge like in Night Warriors: Darkstalkers Revenge, allowing them to perform ES Moves (enhanced versions of their regular special moves) or EX Specials (their super moves). They can also perform Guard Cancels (a counterattacking special move) and Chain Combos (which allows them to link any basic moves with another one of equal or greater strength). Darkstalkers characters can air block and dash, as well as do standing-up attacks and move while they're down.

- Anakaris
- Demitri
- Felicia
- Jedah

=== Street Fighter Alpha ===
The Street Fighter Alpha characters have single-level Custom Combo gauge and can perform a specific Super Combo or a Custom Combo when the gauge is 50% full. Does more damage at MAX level. They can also air block and perform Alpha Counters or recovering rolls.

- Guy (originally from Final Fight)
- Karin
- Rose
- Sakura

=== Red Earth ===
The characters from Red Earth have a Gem gauge which allows the player to stock up to two gems after the gauge fills up. When the player has a gem in stock, they can level-up their character and make them stronger or perform a Mystic Break (their super moves). The Red Earth characters have a blocking technique called the "Ultimate Guard", which allows them to block all attacks (except throws) without consuming energy. They can also follow an Ultimate Guard with an "Ultimate Counter".

- Leo
- Hauzer
- Hydron (Nool in Japan)
- Kenji (ムクロ, Mukuro in Japan)

=== Street Fighter III ===
The characters from Street Fighter III have a two-level Super Art gauge. Unlike in Street Fighter III, the characters in this game cannot select a Super Art before battle, but they have access to more than one Super Art (much like their Street Fighter II counterparts) as well as EX Moves, powered-up versions of their regular Special Moves. Players can also "parry" an opponent's attacks, which allows them to nullify one hit of an attack and usually slow down the attacker enough to allow the defender to make a quick counterattack.

- Alex
- Chun-Li (originally from Street Fighter II)
- Urien
- Yun

=== Original character ===
- Ingrid — Ingrid is the only new character featured in the game, although she was one of the new characters intended to debut in the unreleased 3D fighting game Capcom Fighting All-Stars. She uses a unique fighting style with a three-level Super Arts gauge. In her ending, it is revealed that she is the Goddess of the Sun.

=== Bosses ===
- Pyron (from Darkstalkers) (Final boss)
- Shin Akuma (Shin Gouki in Japan) (originally from Street Fighter Alpha 2) (Sub-boss)

== Soundtrack ==
Capcom Fighting Jam: Original Soundtrack, an officially licensed soundtrack of the game, was released on December 12, 2004, in Japan only. This album features the original music found in the game composed by Noriyuki Asakura. The first pressing of this album came with an exclusive mini disc that featured both the vocal and instrumental versions of Ingrid's Theme; 'Heat Haze' by Maiko Kubo. The cover artwork was done by Shinkiro.

== Release ==
The PlayStation 2 version was revealed at E3 2004, and versions for the Xbox and Japanese arcades were revealed soon after. The arcade version was re-released in 2025 as part of Capcom Fighting Collection 2.

== Reception ==
Reception

Aggregate score
Aggregator	Score	
Aggregator	PS2	Xbox
Metacritic	57/100	61/100

Review scores
Publication	Score	
Publication	PS2	Xbox
Electronic Gaming Monthly	4.83/10 (Note: Three critics of Electronic Gaming Monthly gave the PlayStation 2 version each a score of 4/10, 5.5/10, and 5/10.)	N/A
Famitsu	26/40	N/A
Game Informer	6/10	N/A
GameRevolution	D	N/A
GameSpot	6.5/10	6.5/10
GameSpy	2.5/5	2.5/5
GameTrailers	N/A	4.5/10
GameZone	6.6/10	6.7/10
Hardcore Gamer	N/A	1.25/5
IGN	6.8/10	6.8/10
Official U.S. PlayStation Magazine	1.5/5	N/A
Official Xbox Magazine (US)	N/A	3.3/10
X-Play	3/5	3/5
Detroit Free Press	N/A	1/4

The PlayStation 2 and Xbox versions received "mixed" reviews according to the review aggregation website Metacritic. In Japan, Famitsu gave the former console version a score of 26 out of 40.

The game was criticized because all of the characters, except Ingrid, were copy-and-pasted from their respective games, where the Street Fighter II characters were taken from Street Fighter Alpha and Capcom vs. SNK 2, but had drastically cut-down animation frames. Comparisons were instantly drawn to the similar Vs. Marvel and SNK series of games, and the gameplay of this newest fighter seemed to lack the finesse of previous games. Many series favorites such as Ken, Sagat and Morrigan were also relegated to background appearances or cameos in the endings, which did little to aid the game's popularity. The game also received criticism that certain moves that the characters originally had were not available to the player, which led to some backlash from fans of the games. Michael "Major Mike" Weigand of GamePro said that the PlayStation 2 version was "too routine to stand out from the crowd--especially for Capcom fighting vets. After a few rounds, you should be more than satisfied." (Note: GamePro gave the PlayStation 2 version two 3.5/5 scores for graphics and fun factor, and two 4/5 scores for sound and control.)

Producer Yoshinori Ono has admitted that the game was essentially a salvaged version of Capcom Fighting All-Stars, and has also stated how the crossover, mechanics, and inclusion of the various gameplay systems inherent to each series lead to balancing problems. Ono also said that he replaced another producer who had been in charge of the game's creation before leaving during the middle of its production.
