= Plasma Sword: Nightmare of Bilstein =

1998 video game

- North American arcade flyer
- Developer: Capcom
- Publishers: Capcom; Dreamcast: JP/NA: Capcom; PAL: Virgin Interactive
- Directors: Yoichiro Ikeda; Takayoshi Terada
- Producers: Noritaka Funamizu; Koji Nakajima
- Artist: Bengus
- Composers: Tetsuya Shibata; Takayuki Iwai
- Series: Star Gladiator
- Platforms: Arcade, Dreamcast
- Release: Arcade: JP: March 1998; WW: 1998; Dreamcast: JP: December 9, 1999; NA: April 10, 2000; PAL: August 25, 2000
- Genre: Fighting
- Modes: Single-player, multiplayer
- Arcade system: Sony ZN-2

Plasma Sword: Nightmare of Bilstein (Note: Known in Japan as Star Gladiator 2: Nightmare of Bilstein, (スターグラディエイター2 ナイトメア オブ ビルシュタイン, Sutāguradieitā Tsū Naitomea obu Birushutain)) is a 1998 arcade fighting game developed and published by Capcom, and the sequel to 1996's Star Gladiator. It uses Sony's ZN-2 arcade system board, an improved version of the PlayStation based ZN-1 hardware previously used for its predecessor. A port for Dreamcast was subsequently released in 2000.

The game reworks and improves elements from Star Gladiator, such as the control system and gameplay mechanics, while adding new concepts such as the Plasma Field; a type of special move that traps the opponent when hit and activates a different effect depending on the character selected.

Upon release, the critical reception towards the Dreamcast version of Plasma Sword was mixed: it received praise for the refined gameplay and visual style but was criticized for its lack of originality in terms of mechanics. The game has since been re-released as part of the 2025 game compilation Capcom Fighting Collection 2.

== Gameplay ==
The control system from the first Star Gladiator was reworked and rebuilt for the sequel. Much like the first game, players are given an arsenal of four usable buttons. Two of the buttons are attacks for a fighter's weapon while one button is used for a kick attack and the final button is used for inward and outward sidesteps as well as dashes. The Plasma Combo System was discarded in favor of the Plasma Strike System, in which all characters have a Plasma Gauge (similar to the ones found in Street Fighter and Darkstalkers) and that they can store up to three levels of the Plasma Gauge, enabling them to pull off super moves called Plasma Strikes. Unlike the first game, fighters are able to battle on an endless 3D plane field, meaning that ring-outs were unavailable from within sight. Like other 3D fighting games, set combos were implemented through tapping a specific sequence of buttons. However, characters could perform special moves from within the combos themselves, akin to 2D fighting games (similar to the treatment found in the Street Fighter EX series). Characters can also counter incoming attacks using a Plasma Reflect or Plasma Revenge tactic against their opponent, requiring at least half of a Plasma Gauge level.

One new tactic introduced from within Plasma Sword is that characters were granted a unique special skill called a Plasma Field. With the use of one level from the Plasma Gauge, the character who activates it will emit a sphere of Plasma energy around them. If the opposing character is hit by it, the 3D plane field will be temporarily boxed in with four invisible walls, making escape from the Plasma Field quite difficult. The effects of the Plasma Field vary with each character, ranging from infinite Plasma Strikes, growing to gigantic sizes, and even stopping time.

The Arcade Mode of Plasma Sword has the player going through eight stages of combat. Upon reaching the fifth stage, the player character encounters a mid-boss that further advances the story of the player character. Once the player reaches the eighth and final stage, they battle a final boss specific to their player character. Depending on the number of Battle Ability points that the player acquires during Arcade Mode, the player character will have a unique ending. If the player is unable to gain the required amount of Battle Ability points needed in order to continue on, the player character will have an abridged ending. Should the player succeed in gaining the required number of Battle Ability points, they will have the opportunity to face off against another CPU-controlled character, who is considered to be the "true" final boss for the player character. Once they are defeated, the player is presented with an extended conclusion of the player character's story that is considered to be the "true" ending.

== Story ==
One year after Hayato Kanzaki of the Star Gladiators killed Fourth Empire leader Dr. Edward Bilstein on planet Zeta, the Earth Federation is enjoying an era of peace. However, the Fourth Empire has begun to rebuild its forces to resume their goal of universal conquest, with rumors of Bilstein having been reborn. Federation troopers were sent to Zeta to investigate these rumors, but were immediately wiped out by unknown forces. To protect the universe, the Star Gladiators, now joined by new allies including their former enemy Zelkin, set out on a quest to once again destroy Bilstein and the Fourth Empire.

== Characters ==
With the exception of Rimgal and Kappah, the remaining characters of the original Star Gladiator return for the sequel. The ten returning characters are joined by fourteen new characters, of which ten are "mirror images" of the returning ones, two are new characters with their own unique fighting styles (Rain and Byakko), and two are mirror images of the two new characters. The twelve "mirror image" characters share the same weaponry, attacks, and Plasma Fields of the original cast and the two new characters, but have their own unique Plasma Strikes, character designs, and original stories. There are two optional sub-bosses/secret characters (Kaede and Rai-On) that can only be played through the use of codes. Both of these are mirror images of Rain and Byakko, but with certain differences. Kaede, for instance, has a different melee fighting style than Rain consisting of ninja kicks, while Rain's melee fighting style consists of attacking opponents with the handle of her Plasma Scythe.

Hayato Kanzaki: After learning that Bilstein has returned, Hayato returns to the fray determined to finish him off for good. Hayato's profile quote is "Bilstein, this time I'll give you the final blow!"

June Lin Milliam: After learning that Bilstein, who was responsible for her father's death, is still alive, June heads off on her own to avenge him.

Saturn Dyer: The leader of the Star Gladiators, Saturn leads his allies to Bilstein's fortress to defeat the tyrant. In his true ending, Saturn confronts his rival Prince, who is determined to prove that he is a better street performer than Saturn. Saturn's profile quote, geared presumably towards Prince, is "You never learn."

Gamof Gohgry: After having previously returned to his homeworld of Planet De Rosa, Gamof fights again after the threat of Bilstein reemerges.

Franco Gerelt: As before, he fights for the Fourth Empire again under mysterious circumstances, but it is later revealed that he did this as a result of a bomb being planted in his body. In his true ending, he is happily reunited with his wife and daughter.

Vector: The final mass-produced model of the series which is about three times more powerful than the old version.

Zelkin Fiskekrogen: Remorseful over having previously fought for the Fourth Empire, Zelkin sets off to Planet Zeta to team up with Hayato and his friends to take on Bilstein and repay what he feels is his debt.

Gore Gajah: Still experimenting with plasma magic, Gore uses this to create an artificial being called Luca, leading to something changing within him.

Blood Barbarians: After having freed himself from Bilstein's mental control, he continues to fight against Bilstein; determined to stop his evil plans. His profile quote is "Bilstein, I will hunt you down!"

Dr. Edward Bilstein: The evil scientist who has come back to life under mysterious circumstances to wreak havoc on the universe once again. His profile quote (reflecting his overconfidence) is "Hahahaha, the Emperor never dies. The Fourth Reich is immortal, and Bilstein is eternal!"

Black Hayato: Previously appearing in Star Gladiator as a palette swap of Hayato, the sequel has him return as a separate character, with his backstory being in that he's an evil version of Hayato who temporarily takes over his body via a genotype microchip implanted into Hayato by Bilstein during their last battle.

Ele: A mysterious, yet kind and cheerful young girl who fights like June. In reality, as evident by both her and Gamof's endings, she is in fact June and Hayato's daughter, who came from the distant future to stop Bilstein's ghost from killing them.

Prince Saturn Kuida-Ore III: A royal prince of his home planet, he joins the Fourth Empire out of jealously towards his self-proclaimed rival, Saturn Dyer, for being the best street performer. He simply refers to himself as "Prince", an alias he took to use the empire's influence as a front to take out his rival. Prince's profile quote, directed towards his rival, is "Saturn, I'm going to outsmart you this time!"

Gantetsu: A Japanese military soldier of the Earth Federation who is also a heavy drinker, and uses a Plasma Axe like Gamof. Despite lacking strategic thinking, he makes up for it with his tough stamina and relentless endurance in combat. He is sent by his superiors to capture Gerelt for his alignment with the Fourth Empire. Gantetsu's pursuit of Gerelt is also personal, as a military unit Gantetsu led was wiped out by a unit that Gerelt was a part of. However, as Gantetsu learns the truth behind Gerelt's allegiance to the Fourth Empire, he forgives him.

Claire: A loyal Spanish female fencer of the Fourth Empire, who is also an old friend of Gerelt. Because of her fencing skill, she is known as Scarlet Del Sol. She is also revealed to be entrusted with a trigger to the bomb planted inside Gerelt's chest, after Bilstein implanted it to force Gerelt to serve him. Out of respect towards Gerelt, Claire did not activate the trigger, and prefers to demand an explanation as to why he planned to betray the empire. This also results in her being suspected as a traitor as well. Ultimately, she sacrifices her life to save Gerelt from Gore's assistant, Luca, allowing Gerelt to be set free and rejoin his family, safely.

Omega: A prototype Vector robot who was disposed of in a pile of junk. After it reactivates after being hit by lightning, Omega seeks to find the answer about what the "heart" is. When it encounters Ele, near the time its battery runs out, Omega comes to learn the meaning of having a heart. Its remains would later be found by a group of kids many years later, with one of them pointing out that the robot is "smiling".

Eagle: An American superhero who dresses as an eagle inspired by Zelkin. Once an ordinary man who used to work as a faux superhero at Gorakuem Amusement Park, the Fourth Empire's tyranny is what drives Eagle to become a real superhero.

Luca: An artificial being created by Gore to serve him. Despite her kind and cheerful personality, she also has unusual sadistic tendencies and is naive to the concept of pain and death, killing other people as if it were a game. In her true ending, upon learning the truth from Omega and Bilstein, Luca suffers a mental breakdown and unknowingly kills Gore. In Claire's ending, she presumably dies in an attempt to take both Gerelt and Claire's lives with her, but fails to do so. In Gore's ending, she goes on the run with Gore, with Luca herself admitting to prefer Gore's new handsome look.

Shaker: One of the many cybernetic clones of Blood with a love of rock music. In the true ending, they initially fight each other to determine who is the original Shaker, but after one of the Shakers accidentally kills Bilstein while fighting him (after the latter promises to reveal to him who is the strongest Shaker if he beats him in a fight), they ultimately decide to move on from the subject and form a rock band.

Ghost Bilstein: When Bilstein had transferred his spirit into a new cybernetic body, a part of his soul (filled with nothing but hatred for Hayato) remained in his old cybernetic body and took on a life of its own, obsessed with finding and killing Hayato. His profile quote, directed to the one who previously slew him, is "Hayato... where are you...?"

Rain Bilstein: The daughter of Bilstein who fights with a Plasma Scythe. Her father sent her to capture all of the male Plasma masters and imprison them at his lair, with a prime target being Hayato to capture his DNA, and use it to impregnate his own daughter, making her the mother of "New Human Beings": people who would hypothetically have unstoppable Plasma power to the point of easy universal domination. Rain's true vision is to turn men into her loyal and faithful slaves, to which in her true ending, Rain betrays her father and dethrones him, due to his domination plan being too boring for her.

Byakko: A mysterious Plasma Claw-wielding humanoid white tiger alien ninja of The Four Saint Beasts, created by the Union to foil Bilstein's plans, including disposing any third-party Plasma wielder they meet. Unbeknownst to Byakko, the Union plans to betray him, due to the former becoming more powerful. In his true ending, after learning of the Union's betrayal, Byakko goes on the run from them.

Kaede: A kunoichi who uses a Plasma Hammer, in contrast to Rain's Plasma Scythe. She was sent by the Earth Federation to seal off the Plasma power of all the other fighters. When her benefactors turn on her in her true ending, she steals all of their money from their safe and escape, so that she can spend the rest of her days in complete luxury. She serves as both an optional sub-boss and hidden character.

Rai-On: In contrast to his fellow ninja of The Four Saint Beasts, Byakko, Rai-On is very ruthless and aggressive. In his true ending, connected to Byakko's own ending, after Byakko learns that the Union attempts to dispose of him for becoming too powerful, he escapes and Rai-On sends three other members of the Four Saints (Seiryu, Suzaku, and Genbu) to help him find and dispose their former teammate. He serve as both an optional sub-boss and hidden character.

== Development ==
The game was exhibited at the February 1998 AOU Show, then under the title Star Gladiator like its predecessor.

== Reception ==
Reception

Aggregate score
Aggregator	Score
GameRankings	61%

Review scores
Publication	Score
AllGame	1.5/5
CNET Gamecenter	4/10
Electronic Gaming Monthly	6.375/10 (Note: Four critics of Electronic Gaming Monthly gave the Dreamcast version each a score of 7/10, 6/10, 4.5/10, and 8/10 in an early review.)
EP Daily	6/10
Eurogamer	2/10
Famitsu	31/40
Game Informer	7.25/10
GameFan	(J.W.) 88% 81% (Note: In GameFan's early viewpoint of the Dreamcast version, three critics gave it each a score of 88, 86, and 69.) (F.M.) 69%
GameRevolution	D+
GameSpot	6.6/10
GameSpy	6/10
IGN	(US) 6.8/10 (JP) 5.8/10
Next Generation	(ARC) 4/5 (DC) 2/5

The Dreamcast version received mixed reviews according to the review aggregation website GameRankings. An unnamed reviewer of Next Generation said of the arcade version in its September 1998 issue, "Capcom has taken few (if any) big steps forward with Plasma Sword, but the fighting game giant has managed to round out and deepen the gameplay essentials of its growing 3D library." 18 issues later, however, Jeff Lundrigan of the same magazine (now labeled NextGen) said of the former version in his early review on its March 2000 issue, "If you're working your way down the list of Dreamcast brawlers, this is the one to buy next to last (just ahead of Mortal Kombat Gold)." In Japan, Famitsu gave the same console version a score of 31 out of 40.

Also in Japan, Game Machine listed the arcade version in their June 1, 1998 issue as the third most-successful arcade game of the month.

In one (albeit early) review, Jake The Snake of GamePro called the Dreamcast version "a good-looking game with lots of visual variety. It's not in the top tier of fighting games with Soul Calibur [sic], but it does offer plenty of intense action—especially when you're trading huge special attacks with a human opponent." (Note: GamePro gave the Dreamcast version two 4/5 scores for graphics and fun factor, 3.5/5 for sound, and 4.5/5 for control in an early review.) In another review, Kilo Watt said that the same console version "won't win any points for originality (and certainly not for sheer graphics alone), but it still comes out as a fun title that is worth at least a rental." (Note: GamePro gave the Dreamcast version two 2.5/5 scores for graphics and sound, 4/5 for control, and 3.5/5 for fun factor in another review.)

== See also ==
- Project X Zone 2
