= Ingrid (Street Fighter) =

Playable Street Fighter character

- Street Fighter character
- Ingrid in Capcom Fighting Evolution
- First game: Capcom Fighting Evolution (2004)
- Created by: Toyohisa Tanabe; Hidetoshi "Neo_G" Ishizawa
- Designed by: Senri Kita
- Voiced by: English: Rebecca Wang; Japanese: Masako Jō; Manami Numakura (Street Fighter 6)

Ingrid (Japanese: イングリッド, Hepburn: Inguriddo) is a character in Capcom's Street Fighter series. Conceived by Toyohisa Tanabe, she was originally intended to debut in the 2003 fighting game Capcom Fighting All-Stars. After the game was cancelled, her character was repurposed with a new origin for the 2004 fighting game Capcom Fighting Evolution by Hidetoshi "Neo_G" Ishizawa. She has since appeared in a variety of Capcom titles, including the PlayStation Portable port of Street Fighter Alpha 3, and Street Fighter 6's "Year 3" season pass.

Designed by artist Senri Kita, Ingrid is intended to be a lolibaba, a term for an old woman with a young figure. To this end her exposed skin is minimized to suggest her maturity, incorporating tights and gloves to this end, while her hair indicates her actual age. For some time, whether the character was canon to the Street Fighter franchise was up in question, with some indicating she had been changed to a guest character until 2024 where she was incorporated in more media related to it.

Ingrid has received mixed reception since her debut. While some commentary praised the unique aspects she brought to the Street Fighter series, others felt she was out of place, and fit more in Capcom's other franchises. Additionally, her role in Alpha 3 proved divisive, as reviewers felt it undermined longtime series antagonist M. Bison. Despite this, she has also been noted as far more popular with Japanese audiences, often appearing in the higher rankings of popularity polls conducted in the country.

== Conception and development ==
Ingrid was created by Toyohisa Tanabe for a planned 2003 inner-company crossover fighting game Capcom Fighting All-Stars. Intended to be one of its new playable characters and dubbed a "code holder", she would have had a relationship of some fashion with the final boss, Death. While Ingrid would have had high regeneration and longevity, Death's body was in a state of decay. Due to the fact they could only spend a limited time together, Death would have rigged an atomic bomb which the players would have had to rush to defuse as part of his death game. All-Stars however would ultimately be cancelled.

Later during the development of a similar title in 2004 for Capcom, Capcom Fighting Evolution, planner Hidetoshi "Neo_G" Ishizawa wanted to include original elements in the game instead of just returning characters, and considered Ingrid. Though he had only participated for about a week on the title Ishizawa had assisted with her development and felt a connection to the character. Instead of simply copying and pasting the original concept however they deconstructed and refined it while taking into consideration the original composition, aiming to recreate her as an original character in the game. Her sprites were by done by the same animator that developed Chun-Li's for Street Fighter III: 3rd Strike, and created by examining her 3D model in All-Stars.

An additional variation of Ingrid called "Dark Ingrid" was also in plans for Evolution, with several different variations of her design considered, but not completed; Dark Ingrid was later implemented into Street Fighter 6. While Ingrid herself has since appeared in multiple titles, her backstory has been very inconsistent, such as establishing that she is from the future in one game while another states she is a goddess. According to Capcom developer "Bug", Ingrid in Evolution is intended to be a completely separate character from her All-Stars counterpart. When asked about this, Tanabe stated he felt it was better the character not be weighed down by a specific setting as this would limit creativity with them.

=== Design ===
Standing 152 centimetres (5 ft 0 in) tall and with measurements of 78-58-80 cm (31-21-32 in), Ingrid is a short woman with long white hair, bangs, and red eyes. Her hair on the sides of her head feature two large round hair clips. Meanwhile, her outfit consists of a light blue jacket with fabric extensions around the shoulders and large gold buttons down the middle, a matching skirt with a frilled petticoat underneath, and brown tights cover her legs leading to her black buckled, Mary Jane styled shoes on her feet. Meanwhile, her hands are covered with white gloves, and a large white bow rests on her chest right below her collar. The "Dark" version of her character was to have a similar design, but with a black color scheme instead of blue, solid red eyes, a butterfly shaped bow, and a diminished bustline.

Ingrid's design was intended by Tanabe to be an 80-year old lolibaba, a term for a much older woman with a young figure. Designed by artist Senri Kita, since she was supposed to be mentally quite old they minimized the amount of bare skin on her body, using tights, a high collar and gloves to do so. While physically she looks young, she has white hair to indicate her actual age. As her overall design gives a cooled appearance, her eyes were made red to act as the opposite and give a stronger impression. Meanwhile, her hair crests were meant to resemble gates and reflect hair clips worn by Spanish aristocrats in the past, The patterns on them feature imagery related to the Babylonian goddess Isis, her original "code" in All-Stars.

In Street Fighter 6, her primary outfit was changed to a light blue sleeveless bodysuit that extended up over most of her head, with her hair held in two bunds on the side, with the large gold hairclips around each end. Atop this she wears a white smock with a multi-layered cloak over her shoulders, the topmost being the same shade of blue as her bodysuit but with a gold pattern. Her arms are covered by detached sleeves that extend from her mid-bicep over her hands, with her fingers and thumbs exposed. Her shoes on the other hand retain the same design as the originals, just now a whiteish-blue.

== Appearances ==
Ingrid is a young woman who first appeared in the 2004 fighting game Capcom Fighting Evolution, where she is one of several playable characters and the only original character in the game. Later, at the request of Ishizawa, she appeared in the 2006 PlayStation Portable game Street Fighter Alpha 3 MAX, a port of Alpha 3 that added additional new characters. In this appearance, she is established as trying to take back a power that series antagonist M. Bison stole from her. In 2025, Ingrid was added to the Capcom Fighting Collection 2 version of the game via a post-launch update. In Street Fighter X Tekken, while she does not appear in the game itself, she appears in the game's tie-in prequel comic, which establishes that she is a goddess and the creator of Pandora, a mysterious prize the fighters in the game seek to claim as their own.

Ingrid's role as part of the canon Street Fighter series has been questioned. Matt Moylan, Director of Publishing for UDON Entertainment, stated they were informed not to use her in the franchise's related comics without special permission and that she had been designated as a guest character, a statement confirmed by series director Takayuki Nakayama in 2016 who added it was not his decision. However, in 2024 she was included in Capcom's World Warrior Encyclopedia canon guide for the franchise by UDON, and later in 2025 announced as a character for Street Fighter 6's "Year 3" season pass. In the game's story, Ingrid encounters the player character and teaches them her fighting style. During the process, she takes them to an alternate dimension, battles her Dark Ingrid counterpart, and alters time to prevent the death of the player's friend Bosch Waraya.

In terms of gameplay, Ingrid is designed to be a close- to mid-range fighter, succeeding best when close to the opponent. Her Sun Shot projectile fires in a short range arc before it dissipates, with the stronger variations able to hit crouching opponents. Sun Rise meanwhile has her vault forward slightly before doing a diagonal upward flip kick, while Sun Upper acts as a counterattack move and will launch the opponent upward if they strike the shield she generates in front of herself. In additional she has several super attacks: Sunburst, which launches an exploding projectile that goes in front of her, and Shinshine, which causes her to pirouette across the screen and the opponent as she does. Lastly, Sun Delta generates a large shield in front of her at varying distances; if it connects, the opponent will take repeated damage as they are lifted upward before being slammed into the ground. Ingrid's gameplay was modified for her appearance in Street Fighter 6, which gave her the ability to teleport using her Vanishing Sun ability, perform a counterattack with her Sun Veil move, and strengthen her attacks by infusing herself with the power of up to four Sun Crests. A secret command allows Ingrid to transform into Dark Ingrid, giving her access to additional moves.

Ingrid has appeared in several other games including Project X Zone 2, Onimusha Soul, SNK vs. Capcom: Card Fighters DS, Otoranger, and TEPPEN. A character model of Ingrid was used to test early builds of Tatsunoko vs. Capcom, appearing in build screenshots of the game, but the character was not included in the final product.

== Promotion and reception ==
To promote the character and Capcom Fighting Evolution, several figures were produced by companies such as Banpresto, Ensky, and a gashapon figure of her Midnight Bliss transformation by Yujin. The soundtrack for Evolution included a vocal version of her theme song, "Heat Haze", as a bonus mini-CD. Other items such as playmats were also released featuring her likeness. Additionally an outfit based on her appearance was made available for the character Karin Kanzuki in Street Fighter V. To promote her release in Street Fighter 6, the character "took over" the game's Steam blog page, commenting on humanity's "obsession with the numbers '6 7'".

Ingrid received mixed reception since her debut. Imran Khan of Paste voiced disdain for the character, stating that while little was known about her he considered her one of Street Fighter's worst characters due to what he considered a forced story push and pandering character design, and hoped she would not return to the series. Similar complaints were raised by Timothy Blake Donohoo of Comic Book Resources, who also cited her "lolita schoolgirl design" as cementing the opinion that she did not belong in the franchise, fitting more with characters from SNK's King of Fighters franchise or Capcom's Darkstalkers series. He further voiced disdain for her appearance in Project x Zone 2 for her personality, which he described as being sarcastic and insulting other female characters based on their attire. He ultimately felt her "problematic" backstory should be kept out of the series' canon, and her outfit instead relegated as a costume for more popular franchise characters.

Gavin Jasper of Den of Geek described her as Street Fighter's most obscure character, consistently shown to be the most powerful character in the franchise and dwaring Bison in that regard and responsible for objects such as the Pandora macguffin in Street Fighter x Tekken. At the same time, these abilities and items are never fully explained in his view, seemingly just existing. Jasper further stated that Ingrid "breaks the Street Fighter universe". He drew a direct comparison between her and DC Comics character the Phantom Stranger, arguing that she was only a magical girl archetype because of the influence of anime aesthetics. Going further, he expressed that while having the series' cast fight fantastical characters in crossover titles was fine, an attempt to canonize such a character felt off to him, and worse cheapened Bison as a character.

Others were more receptive, such as Marc McEntegart of Eurogamer who stated that while players would be quick to shun Ingrid's appearance in MAX as he initially did, he found her gameplay to be so different from the rest of the cast she became a welcome addition to the title. Suriel Vazquez and Eric Van Allen in their own article for Paste instead praised her ballet-esque fighting style as unique, adding that while she served as an outlier in the series they were hopeful she could see a return. The staff of Famitsu meanwhile noted that while she was a niche character, she was also one of Capcom's more popular characters with a strong fanbase. Cale Michael in an article for Sports Illustrated corroborated this, stating that she had a strong fan following in Japan, often ranking in the top five character popularity polls in the country. He welcomed the idea of seeing her in Street Fighter 6, as he felt she provided a near blank slate for the developers to work with.
