= Project Justice =

2000 video game

- Japanese arcade flyer
- Developer: Capcom
- Publishers: Capcom; Dreamcast: JP/NA: Capcom; PAL: Virgin Interactive
- Director: Hideaki Itsuno
- Producers: Yoshihiro Sudo; Koji Nakajima
- Composers: Yuki Iwai; Etsuko Yoneda; Setsuo Yamamoto
- Series: Rival Schools
- Platforms: Arcade, Dreamcast
- Release: Arcade: JP: December 2000; NA: March 2001; Dreamcast: JP: 17 December 2000; EU: 13 April 2001; NA: 16 May 2001
- Genre: Fighting
- Modes: Single player, multiplayer
- Arcade system: Sega NAOMI

Project Justice, also known as Project Justice: Rival Schools 2, (Note: In Europe, Australia, and Latin America) and known in Japan as Moero! Justice Gakuen (Note: Japanese: 燃えろ!ジャスティス学園, Hepburn: Moero! Jasutisu Gakuen; "Burn! Justice Academy"), is a 2000 3D fighting video game produced by Capcom as the sequel to Rival Schools: United By Fate (1997). The game was released on the Sega NAOMI arcade board and Dreamcast home console initially in Japan and globally in 2001. Like its predecessor, it revolves around team battles between students of different schools and is set one year later, but teams now have three fighters instead of two and a new move mechanic called Party-Up is introduced. Project Justice received a favorable reception.

== Gameplay ==
Depiction of a Team-Up move

Project Justice's fighting system is lifted from the original Rival Schools, with some notable changes. The game continues to be a team fighter, but has teams of three characters instead of two. This allows another Team-Up attack to be used in a fight, but also adds a new type of attack, the Party-Up, initiated by pressing any three attack buttons. The Party-Up is a three-person attack that varies based on what school the character initiating the attack is from.

The additional partner also allows players to cancel an opponent's Team-Up Special by inputting a Team-Up command of their own. This initiates a short fighting sequence between one character from each team. If the person initiating the sequence gets the first successful hit in during the sequence before time runs out, the Team-Up they are caught in will be canceled, and the game switches back to the main fight; if the opposing player gets the first hit or time runs out, the Team-Up continues as usual.

Additionally, the "vigor" meter in Project Justice is limited to 5 levels (down from 9 in Rival Schools), with Party-Ups requiring all 5 levels, Team-Ups continuing to cost two levels, and any attempts (successful or not) to cancel a Team-Up costing one level.

Also carrying over from the first game, the Dreamcast port of Project Justice in Japan includes a character creation mode that allows a player to create their own fighters who can be used in all modes except for single-player. However, the character creation in Project Justice is packaged as a board game, taking place during an inter-school festival, rather than a date sim game like in Rival Schools. As with School Life Mode in the original Rival Schools, though, this boardgame is not included in non-Japanese ports of Project Justice due to the amount of time it would take to translate the mode. Instead, several unlockable sub-characters were included in these ports, built from the character creation parts in the Japanese version.

All of the playable characters from the previous Rival Schools game return, with the exception of Raizo Imawano and guest character Sakura Kasugano, though the former appears as a non-player character in the game's Story Mode. Five new characters are introduced, along with alternate versions of a few existing characters.

=== Style ===
As in the original game many of the characters use their chosen field of academic or sporting excellence as a fighting style. As a result, special moves - in particular the Two-Person team up moves - tend to have a surreal edge, with methods to injure your opponent ranging from: forcing them to take part in an impromptu bout of synchronised swimming (on dry land) (if Nagare is in your team); confusing them by taking photographs of them in rapid succession during an interview for the school newspaper (if Ran is in your team), or even berating them so severely that they fall unconscious out of shame.

Project Justice's single player mode was structured differently from its predecessor. While Rival Schools only plays a story if characters from the same school were selected, the game instead has separate Story and Free modes.

- In Story Mode, players select a portion of story grouped by school and play through a rigid storyline with a limited group of 2 to 6 characters that the player can choose from for each fight. Like the original game, each fight in story mode is accompanied with 2D cut scenes that advance the story. In some stories, the plot will branch out depending on the results of certain fights or decisions made by the player, changing the fights that the player faces. After fighting the boss of the game, an ending for the school's story is shown.
- In Free Mode, players select a team of three characters and fight random teams of opponents until getting to fight the boss, similar to selecting two characters from different schools in Rival Schools. After defeating the boss, the player is shown a screen where the game rates the performance of player, and gives them a ranking named after a character from the game.

== Plot ==
One year has passed since the events of Rival Schools: United By Fate, and things have gone back to normal in Aoharu City. Batsu Ichimonji, Hinata Wakaba, Kyosuke Kagami, and the rest of the fighters had resumed their normal school lives and all of them have since enjoyed the calm peace that came after their last adventure, but the peace itself doesn't last for long as the fighters would soon find themselves getting involved in a new battle.

Kurow Kirishima: a cold-hearted and ruthless ninja assassin from a mysterious group known only as the "Reverse Society" has his sight set on the Imawano family and plans to eliminate them and their allies so that he can prepare for the advancement of his own ambition to rule Japan. To this end, he attacks Raizo Imawano: the principal of Justice High, father to Batsu and uncle of both Kyosuke Kagami and Hyo Imawano so that he can easily put him out of commission and not have any interference come from him. Secondly, he sends both his older sister Yurika Kirishima and his loyal subordinate Momo Karuizawa into the ranks of the fighters so that the two of them can cause tension and distrust to occur between the friends. His third plot involves brainwashing Gedo gang leader Daigo Kazama so that he can order him into forcing his gang to attack various schools in order to cause even more tension to occur. Lastly, Kurow himself plans to destroy Batsu's reputation by disguising himself as Batsu's doppelganger (named Vatsu) so that he can attack the fighters and make them believe that Batsu is behind it.

Batsu and his friends must fight back against the evil ambition of Kurow and attempt to not let their friendship get destroyed by the conspiracy of a deadly ninja assassin.

== Development and release ==
Japanese Dreamcast cover art

It was released in Japan as an arcade game in December 2000 and ported to the Dreamcast, which shares the Naomi architecture, at the same time. The U.S. version was originally slated for a February 2001 release, before it was further delayed to 16 May.

The arcade version was re-released in 2025 as part of Capcom Fighting Collection 2.

== Reception ==
Reception

Aggregate score
Aggregator	Score
Metacritic	80/100

Review scores
Publication	Score
AllGame	3.5/5
Electronic Gaming Monthly	8.83/10 (Note: In Electronic Gaming Monthly's early review of the Dreamcst version, two critics gave it each a score of 9/10, and the other gave it 8.5/10.)
EP Daily	8/10
Famitsu	33/40
Game Informer	7/10
GameRevolution	B+
GameSpot	7.5/10
GameSpy	8/10
IGN	8.8/10
Next Generation	3/5

The Dreamcast version received "favorable" reviews according to the review aggregation website Metacritic. Many video game magazines gave the game positive reviews while it was still in development. Chester "Chet" Barber of NextGen said of the game in an early review, "Unless you're hard-up for a new fighter, you may want to rent it before making a purchase." Michael "Major Mike" Weigand of GamePro said in an early review, "Fighting fans looking for their next challenge should spend some time with Preject Justice." (Note: GamePro gave the Dreamcast version three 4.5/5 scores for graphics, control, and fun factor, and 4/5 for sound in an early review.) In Japan, Famitsu gave it a score of 33 out of 40.

Also in Japan, Game Machine listed the arcade version as the most successful dedicated arcade game of January 2001.

== See also ==
- Asuka 120%, a similar school-based fighting series
- Street Fighter, related fighting series from Capcom
