= Power Stone 2 =

2000 video game

- Japanese Dreamcast cover art
- Developers: Capcom; Klein Computer Entertainment (PSP)
- Publishers: JP/NA: Capcom; EU: Eidos Interactive
- Director: Hideaki Itsuno
- Producer: Yoshihiro Sudo
- Artists: Akira Yasuda; Hideki Ishikawa
- Composer: Tetsuya Shibata
- Platforms: Arcade, Dreamcast, PlayStation Portable (Power Stone Collection)
- Release: Arcade: WW: April 2000; Dreamcast: JP: April 27, 2000; NA: August 23, 2000; EU: August 24, 2000; UK: September 15, 2000; PlayStation Portable: EU: October 20, 2006; AU: October 25, 2006; NA: October 31, 2006; JP: November 30, 2006
- Genre: Fighting
- Modes: Single-player, multiplayer
- Arcade system: Sega NAOMI

Power Stone 2 (パワーストーン 2, Pawā Sutōn 2) is a multiplayer fighting game developed and published by Capcom. It was released for the Sega NAOMI arcade system in April 2000, with a home port for the Dreamcast releasing later that year. It is the sequel to Power Stone (1999), and built on the innovative gameplay introduced by its predecessor. Power Stone 2 allows up to four players to choose from multiple characters and utilize items such as tables, chairs, and rocks in battle. The game introduced changes from the original, including new character voices, the removal of the existing combo system and a new, horizontal status bar.

The game was ported to the PlayStation Portable as part of the Power Stone Collection in 2006. The arcade version was re-released in 2025 as part of Capcom Fighting Collection 2.

== Gameplay ==
There are four different modes available for the game:

- 1-on-1: Much like the original Power Stone, a two-character storyline game.
- Arcade: A four-character storyline game, with two characters advancing each round.
- Original: Multiplayer mode, with free choice of characters and stages.
- Adventure: An unpredictable storyline game, where players can collect items, cards and money.

Power Stone 2 offers five interactive 3-D stages to begin with, plus the two boss stages which players can also access in Original mode. All but the Original mode is played out like a storyline, where two battles are fought on the regular stages, followed by the Pharaoh Walker boss, then another battle, and ending with the Dr. Erode boss stage. Three extra stages may be unlocked for Original mode by meeting certain requirements in Arcade mode, as well as a desert area stage, which is essentially the Pharaoh Walker boss stage, but without the boss. Though each player has their own set of default ground and air attacks, the character can execute more powerful fusion attacks after collecting three Power Stones and transforming. Players cannot directly block incoming attacks, but can dodge by tapping on the control pad just before an enemy attacks.

Most of the stages are dynamic and will change as the battle progresses. For example, the airplane stage starts out on a warplane. After a set amount of time, the plane will fall apart, forcing all the players to battle while skydiving toward the ground. Shortly after, the players will fall onto a floating platform, where the remainder of the battle will be held. This, in essence, creates three sub-stages within a single one.

Each stage is also littered with item boxes, which hold a random item that a player has acquired and unlocked in Adventure mode or created in the Item Shop. They may also contain Power Stones. Items are extremely diverse. Damaging items range from guns, flamethrowers, gigantic hammers, a wide assortment of swords, to bear traps, roller blades, and even a magazine that can be thrown. Non-damaging items include food that will replenish health, shields for defense, elixirs for invisibility, adhesive sprays to slow your opponents, and wings for extra jumps. Cards that can be used to mix items can also be found in Adventure mode. Furthermore, most stages also have their own collection of unique items and fixtures that the player can use. For example, the submarine level comes with turrets, small airplanes to drop bombs, and icebergs to throw at opponents. Each level is also highly interactive, as players can use many of the stage elements themselves. All players can also gain extra height by jumping off a wall.

=== Item Shop ===
New to Power Stone 2 is the "Adventure" mode. This mode is functionally identical to the "1-on-1" and "Arcade" modes; however, there is an additional inventory filled with items and money that the player has collected. These may then be taken to the game's "Item Shop", run by secret character Mel. The overall goal of the Item Shop is to allow players to gain access to new items; either by purchasing them, or by combining existing items in a 'mixing' process. This gives the game considerable additional longevity, as many of the best or most entertaining items are available only from the Item Shop. Power Stone 2 includes a VMU application called the Mini-Book. This can be used to inspect the player's item inventory, or trade items with another player. Additionally, a player may register up to five items in their inventory as "Handy Items". These may then appear to the player in Original mode, offering a tactical advantage.

== Story ==
Sometime after the search for the Power Stones, a mysterious fortress appears in the sky. Its creator, an evil scientist with an unknown agenda called Dr. Erode, takes the Power Stone warriors prisoner. The Power Stone warriors embark upon a new adventure; one that involves freeing themselves from the evil scientist’s fortress.

== Characters ==
With the exception of Kraken and Valgas (the two of them would later become unlockable characters in the PSP version of the game via the Power Stone Collection), the original cast from the first game returns while being joined by six new characters (with two of them being unlockable):

- Accel (アクセル, Akuseru): A vagrant masked outlaw who holds a calm and cool personality. His Power Change, Vagabond Gunman, alongside having a motorcycle motif is based on the franchises of both the Transformers and Kamen Rider.
- Julia Whitepearl (ジュリア•ホワイトパール, Juria Howaitopāru): An elegant girl with a split radical personality. Her Power Change, Serene Grace is based on a circus carnival performer with both a bird and a dominatrix motif.
- Pete (ピート, Pīto): A sentient wooden doll boy and a genius inventor who is a homage of Pinocchio. He becomes sentient by a Power Stone inside his body. His Power Change, Inventor Boy is based on a robot toy.
- Gourmand (グルマン, Guruman): A chef who works for a luxurious airship named the Royal Heaven. He is secretly evil and ravenous to get his dirty hands on rare delicacies. His Power Change, Evil Chef is a fire breathing Tyrannosaurus Rex.
- Pride Falcon (プライド•フォッカー, Puraido Fokkā; Pride Fokker): Edward Falcon's father who previously debuted as a non-playable character in the first game within his son's ending. His Power Change is Black Whirlwind, which in turn resembles Falcon's Red Whirlwind. He is an unlockable character in the game.
- Mel (メル, Meru): The Item Shop keeper who uses Julia's moveset in gameplay. Unlike other Power Changes, Mel only gains a pair of Angel Wings. She is an unlockable character in the game.
- Pharaoh Walker (ファラオウォーカー, Farao Wōkā): A giant sphinx-like robot, controlled by numerous masked men which serves a non-playable mini-boss.
- Dr. Erode (Dr. エロ土, Dokutā Erodo): The main antagonist who serves as the non-playable final boss. He is a monstrous giant owner of the flying castle and wields a Power Stone resembling Valgas' Dark Power Stone. He aims to steal the fighters' souls to increase his Power Stone.

== Reception ==
Reception

Aggregate score
Aggregator	Score
Metacritic	87/100

Review scores
Publication	Score
AllGame	4/5
CNET Gamecenter	9/10
Edge	8/10
Electronic Gaming Monthly	8.67/10 (Note: In Electronic Gaming Monthly's review of the Dreamcast version, one critic gave it 9/10, and the rest gave it each a score of 8.5/10.)
Eurogamer	9/10
Famitsu	31/40
Game Informer	8.5/10
GameFan	86%
GameRevolution	B+
GameSpot	8/10
GameSpy	7.5/10
IGN	9/10
Next Generation	4/5

The Dreamcast version received "favorable" reviews according to video game review aggregator Metacritic. Matt Sammons of NextGen said of the game's Japanese import, "An innovative and beautiful fighting game, Power Stone 2 will keep you entertained for hours. Just make sure to bring along a few friends." In Japan, Famitsu gave it a score of 31 out of 40.

Also in Japan, Game Machine listed the arcade version in their June 15, 2000 issue as the seventeenth most-successful arcade game of the month.

Mike "Major Mike" Weigand of GamePro said of the Dreamcast version in one review, "Fans of the first Power Stone game should definitely check out this sequel. While it's basically the "more-of-the-same" Power Stone engine of the first game, the extra characters, weapons, and play modes make Power Stone 2 a top offering in the Dreamcast action/fighting genre." (Note: GamePro gave the Dreamcast version three 4.5/5 scores for graphics, sound, and control, and a perfect 5 for fun factor in one review.) In another review, The Freshman said, "Power Stone 2 is everything you've hoped for since the original, with madcap action and four-player mayhem, but a little more depth and less confusion would have rounded this title out nicely. As it is, PS2 is a great multiplayer title that should bring smiles to the faces of Power Stone junkies across the country." (Note: GamePro gave the Dreamcast version two 4.5/5 scores for graphics and fun factor, and two 4/5 scores for sound and control in another review.)
