= Power Stone (video game) =

1999 video game

- Japanese Dreamcast box art
- Developers: Capcom; Klein Computer Entertainment (PSP)
- Publisher: Capcom: EU: Eidos Interactive; (Dreamcast)
- Directors: Tatsuya Nakae; Hideaki Itsuno
- Producer: Takeshi Tezuka
- Artists: Akira Yasuda; Hideki Ishikawa
- Composer: Tetsuya Shibata
- Platforms: Arcade, Dreamcast, PlayStation Portable (Power Stone Collection)
- Release: Arcade: JP: February 1999; NA: March 1999; Dreamcast: JP: February 25, 1999; NA: September 9, 1999; EU: October 14, 1999; PlayStation Portable: EU: October 20, 2006; AU: October 25, 2006; NA: October 31, 2006; JP: November 30, 2006
- Genre: Fighting
- Modes: Single-player, multiplayer
- Arcade system: Sega NAOMI

Power Stone is a 1999 arcade fighting game developed and published by Capcom, released on the Sega NAOMI arcade board and ported to the Dreamcast home console. It consists of battles in three-dimensional environments and contains objects that could be picked up and used. A sequel, Power Stone 2, was released a year later, and manga and anime adaptations have also been made. Both games were later ported to the PlayStation Portable as Power Stone Collection in 2006, known in Japan as Power Stone Portable. Both were also ported to Nintendo Switch, PlayStation 4, Xbox One and Windows in 2025 as part of Capcom Fighting Collection 2.

== Gameplay ==
A screenshot from Power Stone

Gameplay involves selecting a character and then proceeding to battle the other characters, one at a time, in various locales. The three-dimensional fighting includes the ability to use special attacks as well as to pick up and fight with such objects as tables, chairs, rocks and bombs. During battle, "Power Stones", resembling gems of different colors, appear in the arena. If a character collects three Power Stones, they transform into a more powerful version of themself. The character will then be able to use one of two super special attacks: generally a massive long-range power attack and a grab or close-range move. The powered-up mode only lasts until the power bar is fully drained, during which the special attack can be executed (which completely depletes the power bar) or other, lesser special moves can be executed (which only use a small portion of power). Each match continues until the life bar of one of the two characters fighting is depleted.

== Plot ==
Set in the 19th century, strong believers of legends, myths and superstition search for fame, fortune and glory. One legend above all is sought after by many, a treasure which can make any dream come true. Believers from all over the world set out to search for this treasure, and are forced to fight against one another in pursuit of the legendary Power Stone.

== Characters ==
There are 10 characters in the original Power Stone:

- Edward Falcon (エドワード・フォッカ, Edowādo Fokka; Édouard Fokker) is the main character of Power Stone. Aged 21 and weighing 160 lb (73 kg), Fokker measures 5 ft 11 in (1.80 m) and has a fighting style of boxing. He is the son of Pride Falcon (Pride Fokker in Japan), who is playable in Power Stone 2 after unlocking him. He is from Londo (a reference to London). When in Power Change, he is known as the Red Whirlwind. Falcon's Japanese name is a reference to the Fokker, the plane he is seen in. This was possibly removed in the English version because of the inappropriate puns that would follow. His Power Change is a similar hybrid to Iron Man.
- Wang-Tang (ワンタン, Wantan) is an aspiring chef and martial artist from the town of Tong-An. Wang-Tang is age 19, weighs 123 lb (56 kg), measures 5 ft 5 in (1.65 m). When Wang-Tang picks up an item, he says "lucky", whereas the other characters in Power Stone speak Japanese. Wang-Tang's Power Fusions resemble moves from a Super Saiyan from Dragon Ball Z, including moves based on Goku's Kamehameha and Spirit Bomb. He is known as the Agile Dragon when in Power Change.
- Ryoma (リョーマ, Ryōma) is from the town of Mutsu (reference to Mutsu). Ryoma is age 19, weighs 134 lb (61 kg), measures 5 ft 7 in (1.70 m). When in Power Change, he is known as the Master Swordsman which could be seen as a composite of the Silver Samurai and the Ronin Warriors.
- Ayame (あやめ, Ayame) is a travelling entertainer and kunoichi from the town of Oedo (reference to Edo). Ayame is age 16, weighs 93 lb (42 kg), measures 5 ft 2 in (1.57 m). Her power drives and fusions involve shurikens. When in Power Change, she is known as the Cherry Blossom Dancer.
- Rouge (ルージュ, Rūju) (روج) is a fortune teller from the town of Mahdad (a reference to Baghdad). Rouge is age 23, weighs 105 lb (48 kg), measures 5 ft 6 in (1.68 m) and has a Roma Dancing fighting style. When in Power Change, she is known as the Scorching Beauty. Her design looks similar to Pullum from the Street Fighter EX series.
- Jack (ジャック, Jakku) is a mysterious man whose body is heavily covered in bandages. It is rumored that he could be around 40 years old, but the anime has mentioned he is over 100 years old. He weighs 112 lb (51 kg), measures 6 ft 3 in (1.91 m), and has an original fighting style. He and Ryoma are the only two characters in the original Power Stone who wield a weapon. Jack is from the town of Manches (a reference to Manchester). He is likely a reference to Jack the Ripper (a paper in his ending calls him "Jack the Slayer"). When in Power Change, he is known as the Mad Clown.
- Gunrock (ガンロック, Ganrokku) is from the town of Dawnvolta. He is age 38, weighs 440 lb (200 kg), measures 6 ft 4 in (1.93 m). When in Power Change, he is known as the Heavy Tank which bears a resemblance to The Thing from Marvel Comic's Fantastic Four. He shares a name with a character from Capcom's Saturday Night Slam Masters.
- Galuda (ガルーダ, Garūda) is from the town of Dullstown. Galuda is age 34, weighs 242 lb (110 kg), measures 6 ft 7 in (2.01 m). When in Power Fusion, he is known as the Proud Eagle, which looks similar to a totem pole. His appearance is similar to that of T. Hawk from the game Super Street Fighter II.
- Kraken (クラケン, Kuraken) is a pirate from Power Stone. He, like Valgas, is an unlockable character. Kraken is from a pirate ship in Skull Haven. Kraken's age is unknown, weighs 198 lb (90 kg), measures 6 ft 11 in (2.11 m) and has a buccaneer fighting style. When in Power Change, he is known as Ghost Pirate. His name is a reference to the kraken, along with his nickname, King Octopus.
- Valgas (バルガス, Barugasu; Vargas) is a character from Power Stone. He is from the island of Avalon Island. Valgas's age is unknown, weighs 264 lb (120 kg), measures 7 ft 10 in (2.39 m) and has a wrestling fighting style. He is a very powerful character and is quite fast. When defeated, he transforms into the final boss of the game, Final Valgas. His name may be a reference to Vulgus, Capcom's first game.

== Reception ==
Reception

Aggregate scores
Aggregator	Score	
Aggregator	Dreamcast	PSP
GameRankings	83%	75%
Metacritic	N/A	74 / 100

Review scores
Publication	Score	
Publication	Dreamcast	PSP
CNET Gamecenter	8 / 10	N/A
Electronic Gaming Monthly	7.5 / 10 (Note: Two critics of Electronic Gaming Monthly gave the Dreamcast version each a score of 8/10, one gave it 6.5/10, and the other gave it 7.5/10.)	N/A
Eurogamer	N/A	8 / 10
Famitsu	8/10, 9/10, 8/10, 9/10	29 / 40
Game Informer	8 / 10	7.75 / 10
GameFan	(A.C.) 95% (JP) 92% (US) 91% (Note: In GameFan's viewpoint of the Dreamcast version, three critics gave it each a score of 90, 95, and 87.)	N/A
GameRevolution	B+	N/A
GameSpot	7.6 / 10	7.3 / 10
GameSpy	9 / 10	4/5
GameTrailers	N/A	6.6 / 10
IGN	8.7 / 10	N/A
Next Generation	5/5	N/A
Official U.S. PlayStation Magazine	N/A	7.5 / 10
Pocket Gamer	N/A	4/5
411Mania	N/A	6 / 10

The Dreamcast version of Power Stone received "favorable" reviews according to video game review aggregator GameRankings. However, Power Stone Collection received "average" reviews according to video game review aggregator Metacritic. Blake Fischer of NextGen said of the former console version, "Every Dreamcast owner should have this title. It's unique, it's fast, and most importantly, it's loads of fun. In Japan, Famitsu gave it a score of 34 out of 40 for the same console version, and 29 out of 40 for the PSP version.

Also in Japan, Game Machine listed the arcade version in their May 1, 1999 issue as the eighteenth most-successful arcade game of the month. The game sold 200,000 copies.

In the UK, Computer and Video Games gave the Dreamcast version a full 5-star rating, stating that "it's fantastic". Edge gave the same console version's Japanese import a score of nine out of ten, calling it "a jewel in Dreamcast's crown." Larry "Major Mike" Hryb of GamePro said of the game in one review, "Power Stone rocks. It's an entertaining spin on fighting games for fans and non-fans alike. It may lack the technique and depth of Soul Calibur [sic] and Marvel vs. Capcom, but for fun and exciting gameplay, it will be hard to beat." (Note: GamePro gave the Dreamcast version three 4.5/5 scores for graphics, sound, and control, and a perfect 5 for fun factor in one review.) In another review, The D-Pad Destroyer said, "[For] Those of you looking for something new in your fighting games, look no further. Power Stone may not be hard-hitting kung fu action, but it's a lot of fun. Grab a friend and get Stone." (Note: GamePro gave the Dreamcast version three 4.5/5 scores for graphics, control, and fun factor, and 4/5 for sound in another review.) A Severed Head later said of the PSP version, "The games in Power Stone Collection may be a generation old, but after revisiting these two relatively underrated titles, you won't feel like you're playing outdated games. You'd be missing out on one of the best fighting series from Capcom since Street Fighter if you didn't give this one a whirl." (Note: GamePro gave the PSP version two 3.5/5 scores for graphics and sound, and two 4/5 scores for control and fun factor.) Darren Jones of Retro Gamer gave the same PSP version 90%, saying, "The original Power Stone games were criminally ignored when first released, but now all you sinners have been given a second chance with this nigh-on perfect pair of conversions. The first (and best) game plays especially well on the PSP's luxurious screen and both games run at a terrific speed over a wi-fi connection. Pick up this great collection and redeem yourselves before it's too late." GameZone gave said PSP version 7.5 out of 10, saying it was "Fast, frantic, and highly entertaining gameplay – from the first Power Stone. Power Stone 2 isn't nearly as exciting. The sequel is worth playing, but know that this is not worth buying as a 'collection.' Buy it for the original if you love the original."

Colin Williamson of AllGame gave the Japanese Dreamcast import a score of four-and-a-half stars out of five, saying that it was "fast, fluid, and an utter blast to play, especially in the versus mode." Scott Alan Marriott later gave the U.S. version four stars out of five, saying, "The only real problem with Power Stone, aside from the emphasis on evading attacks by jumping around the room, is the lack of characters -- a total of ten are playable after unlocking the bosses, which seems too small a number compared to other fighting games. It also would have been great if the developers doubled the size of the playing field and offered four-player simultaneous action for some truly intense battles. Other than these minor issues, Power Stone shines brightly in a genre filled with so many ordinary titles."

French footballer Thierry Henry named Power Stone as his favourite Dreamcast game during a 1999 promotional session arranged by the French official Dreamcast Magazine and Sega. Henry described it as one of the best fighting games he had played, particularly praising its freedom of movement and the ability to interact with and use objects from the environment.

== Legacy ==
A sequel was released in 2000 called Power Stone 2, which featured the original cast (minus the hidden characters Kraken and Valgas; Kraken would be added to the console ports as an unlockable character) as well as several new characters. The sequel features the same three dimensional combat system, but now allows up to four players to play simultaneously. There are new maps, some of which contain multiple areas and moving sections. The sequel also features an entirely new arsenal of weapons, from futuristic handguns to gigantic mallets, and magic wands to vehicles. Players can collect these items in a special "Adventure" mode; they can then be traded at a special "Item Shop", or combined to form new items.

A remake of the two games was released for the PSP in 2006 under the name Power Stone Collection. This collection contains slightly updated versions of both games (Dreamcast versions) on one UMD. The PSP version of the original Power Stone included the four new characters introduced in Power Stone 2. The arcade version has been re-released in 2025 as part of Capcom Fighting Collection 2.

A lone Power Stone Manga from KC BomBom Comic was issued on March 15, 1999. An anime series adapting the events of the first game premiered in April 1999.
