= Star Gladiator =

1996 video game

- North American arcade flyer
- Developer: Capcom
- Publisher: Capcom: EU: Virgin Interactive Entertainment (PS)
- Directors: Hideaki Itsuno; Eiichiro Sasaki
- Producer: Yoshiki Okamoto
- Artist: Akiman
- Composers: Isao Abe; Yuko Takehara; Michio Sakurai
- Series: Star Gladiator
- Platforms: Arcade, PlayStation
- Release: Arcade: WW: July 1996; PlayStation: JP: October 25, 1996; NA: October 31, 1996; PAL: December 1996
- Genre: Fighting
- Modes: Single-player, multiplayer
- Arcade system: Sony ZN-1

Star Gladiator - Episode 1: Final Crusade (Note: Japanese: スターグラディエイター, Hepburn: Sutāguradietā) is a 1996 arcade fighting game developed and published by Capcom. It is the second game to use the PlayStation based Sony ZN-1 arcade system board, after Battle Arena Toshinden 2, and was the first in-house polygonal fighting game created by Capcom.

The gameplay is based around weapon based duels in 3D arenas which follow traditional fighting game rules. Characters utilize a four-button configuration for their attacks and blocking, and can make use of other gameplay mechanics, such as Plasma Reverses and the unique combo system, to be successful in battles with computer or human controlled opponents.

Upon its release in July 1996 the game received positive critical reception, being praised for its 3D gameplay, visual style, and mechanics. The game was also successful commercially, being listed as the sixteenth most successful fighting game a month after it launched, which led to a sequel, Plasma Sword: Nightmare of Bilstein, being released in 1998. A PlayStation port built off of the Sony ZN-1 hardware was released in October 1996.

== Gameplay ==
PlayStation version gameplay screenshot

Instead of the six-button configuration system seen in past Capcom fighting game series such as Street Fighter II and Darkstalkers, Star Gladiator utilizes a Soulcalibur series-esque four-button configuration system, which consists of two attack buttons for a character's weapon, a kick attack, and a guard defense. The fighters battle upon a hovering arena, and if a fighter is knocked off the arena they lose the round.

Plasma Reverses are two special guard moves that can be unleashed at any time from within a battle. A Plasma Reflect enables a fighter to deflect an opponent's incoming move and stun them, leaving them vulnerable for a few seconds, while a Plasma Revenge enables a fighter to counterattack an opponent's incoming move and strike back with their own fast attack. Characters can also use a Plasma Strike, which can cause huge damage to an opponent if it connects on sight, but a Plasma Strike can only be done once per round.

Star Gladiator also introduces the Plasma Combo System. Through a specific string of attacks, a fighter can combo their opponent even if the opponent is blocking. If a character strings together five hits and presses a specific button at the end of the combo, they initiate a Plasma Final, which unlocks a technique that inflicts a large amount of damage upon their opponent if used. This system was discarded in the game's sequel, Plasma Sword.

The arcade mode of Star Gladiator consists of ten fights. Depending on who the player chooses as their character, they will fight against a specific set of opponents. Gore, who serves as the sub-boss of the game is always fought at Stage 9 and Bilstein, who serves as the final boss of the game is always fought at Stage 10. Depending on how quickly the player defeats Bilstein, either the game ends with a false ending or the player is then taken to a special battle against an unplayable computer-controlled true final boss named Super Bilstein. Losing to Super Bilstein results in both a bad ending and a game over while defeating Super Bilstein results in the chosen character's own true ending.

The events of Star Gladiator take place altogether over the course of 11 stages.

== Story ==
In the year 2348, humans have been exploring the vast reaches of outer space for four centuries and have established peaceful contact with various alien civilizations. People now emigrate from one planet to another. However, some problems arise with a couple of alien races, so the Earth Federation begins developing a Plasma-power weapon to protect the Earth from any outside threats. Dr. Edward Bilstein, a Nobel Prize-winning German-American physicist for the Earth Federation, uncovers the secret to humanity's "sixth sense": a technique for capturing the energy of the human mind, an energy source he calls "Plasma Power". The Plasma weapon is built, and Bilstein gains fame and fortune for the invention. It is discovered by the Earth Federation that Bilstein experimented on actual human bodies during his research on Plasma Power. He is arrested and exiled from Earth, imprisoned in a satellite that orbits the Planet Zeta, while development of the Plasma weapon is indefinitely suspended. Word of Earth's possession of a super weapon spreads throughout the universe and it reduces hostile confrontations.

Four years later, an Earth Federation army base is attacked and destroyed by a small group of rebels calling themselves the "Fourth Empire". Bilstein, who has built himself a powerful cyborg body and escaped from Zeta, is their leader. Realizing their pattern of attacks is leading back to Earth, a panicked Earth Federation searches for people who can utilize Plasma Power in their own given accord and stop Bilstein before he can conquer the universe with his nascent Fourth Empire. All of Earth's hopes rest in the project codenamed "Star Gladiator".

== Characters ==
Hayato Kanzaki - The protagonist of the series. A rebellious young Japanese intergalactic bounty hunter who fights with a Plasma Sword while living on his own and caring about others, especially the children living in the orphanage in which he was raised from and his close friends June, Saturn, and Gamof. Hayato's noble love and determination for his friends is the driving force that prompts him to go up against Bilstein and the Fourth Empire. In his true ending, Hayato returns to the orphanage a month later finding the director closing the doors, and presents her with rolls of money, promising to reform himself. An alternate evil version of him, known as Black Hayato was originally a palette swap in this game prior to becoming a separate character in later appearances. Black Hayato's existence is a result of Hayato being implemented with a "genotype" microchip inside his body by Bilstein. When it unexpectedly activates, Black Hayato temporarily possesses Hayato's body, attacking both enemies and allies alike.

Hayato appears in Marvel vs. Capcom 2. Hayato also makes a cameo appearance in Tekkaman Blade's ending in Tatsunoko vs. Capcom: Ultimate All-Stars, while Black Hayato appears as a boss unit in the tactical RPG Project X Zone 2.

June Lin Milliam - A talented young British-Chinese rhythmic gymnast who fights with a Plasma Ring to avenge the death of her parents by Bilstein (she is unaware that her father is in fact Rimgal). In her true ending, June returns home to visit the picture of her deceased parents. She says to her parents that she has finally avenged them and notes how for many years all she felt was vengeance, but now feels nothing. June and Hayato are reunited. A mysterious young girl named Ele in the second game somehow shares some resemblance to June and has interest in both June and Hayato, before the former and Gamof's endings ultimately reveal that she is their daughter from a distant future, who comes back in time to protect her parents from Bilstein's Ghost.

June makes cameo appearances in two of the background stages in Super Gem Fighter Mini Mix, the Shanghai stage in Capcom vs. SNK 2, one of Hayato's win poses in Marvel vs. Capcom 2, Hawkeye's ending in Ultimate Marvel vs. Capcom 3 as a member of the new West Coast Avengers, and Deadpool's ending from the same game. She also appears as a playable solo unit in Project X Zone 2.

Saturn Dyer - A green-skinned cone-headed alien who is named after the planet where he comes from in the Andromeda Galaxy of the universe (but not the one present in Earth's Solar System), he fights with Plasma Yo-Yos while having quite an eccentric yet friendly personality. Saturn is a renowned popular street performer on his home planet, with a clown-like attitude and a perennial ten-mile-wide smile. Upon coming to Earth in order to enjoy his hobby of theater while on a new assignment to research life on Earth, Saturn learns about the threat of the Fourth Empire and joins the Star Gladiator project in order to help protect both Earth and his home planet. In his true ending, Saturn is thanked by the general back at the United Force base for a job well done. A few days later, at the Pompidou Center in Paris (the place where Saturn first learned about yo-yos from seeing a performance on TV) Saturn is entertaining people on the streets, surrounded by a crowd. Because of Dyer's popularity gaining attractions across the galaxy, a jealous royal Saturn prince named Kuida-Ore III sees him as a rival, and ends up joining the Fourth Empire in the second game to defeat Dyer under the alias Prince.

Saturn makes a cameo appearance in one of Hayato's win poses in Marvel vs. Capcom 2.

Gamof Gohgry - A brown-furred ape-like alien who comes from the forest planet of De Rosa which lies from within the Andromeda Galaxy of the universe and who fights with a Plasma Axe. Gamof's job as a lumberjack is compromised by an unknown Earth microbe virus that destroys nearly all of De Rosa's forests. It was discovered that a type of thistle that can only be grown on Planet De Rosa is the raw material for a drug called "White Heaven," which is 3,000 times more potent than heroin. People competed to grow this money-producing plant, and the planet's rich forests were devastated. The ordinary people of Planet De Rosa were forced to leave their devastated planet and go to work. Gamof becomes a reluctant bounty hunter and meets up with Hayato, becoming good friends with him. When Gamof learns about the threat of the Fourth Empire, he joins the Star Gladiator project along with Hayato so that he can protect both his home planet and his family. In Gamof’s true ending, its revealed that a few years after the Final Crusade, Gamof had purchased the woodlands with his reward money and decided to return to his peaceful life as a lumberman. However, to ensure that the woodlands are never corrupted again, Gamof forms an organization against drugs. Several years after the event of the sequel, he is frequently visited by Hayato, June and a younger Ele. His human counterpart in the second game is a fellow Star Gladiator and a Japanese military war soldier named Gantetsu.

Franco Gerelt - A renowned and honorable Spanish matador, he is an expert fencer and fights with a Plasma Rapier. Seeing the strong potential that Gerelt has from his fighting skills, Bilstein kidnapped Gerelt's wife and daughter with the help of a rival matador who had envied Gerelt's popularity and skill and coerced Gerelt to follow his command. Bilstein also implanted a bomb in his chest which would be triggered if he disobeys. To his dismay, his old Spanish female friend, Claire, is loyal to Bilstein. In his true ending, Gerelt surrenders to the Earth’s United Forces and was prepared to accept the death penalty for his reluctant past crimes, but to his shock, he learns that his punishment is five years in prison, thanks to his adoring fans who had helped rescue Gerelt’s family from prison and clear his name, after the truth about how Bilstein blackmailed him was revealed and that Gerelt is overjoyed to be reunited with his wife and daughter.

Vector - An emotionless prototype assassin robot created by Bilstein to be the ultimate killing weapon. It fights with a Plasma Gun. Vector's only directive is to seek and destroy every single human being. Its previous version in the second game is a prototype called Omega. Vector makes a cameo appearance in Roll's ending in Tatsunoko vs. Capcom, in which he is reprogrammed to do household tasks.

Rimgal - June's father, the former English scientist Michael Milliam turned into a Velociraptor dinosaur who fights with a Bone Club after Bilstein experimented on him. Rimgal fights to try and control his transformation. However, Rimgal ultimately fails, and fearing his primal instincts will overtake his human sensitivity and end up having him kill his daughter, Rimgal kills himself in the end. Rimgal is the only regular character not to return in Plasma Sword: Nightmare of Bilstein (along with Kappah, a secret character).

Zelkin Fiskekrogen - A blue-feathered bird-like humanoid alien from the Planet Klondike, which lies from within the Andromeda Galaxy of the universe. He fights with a Plasma Claw. Zelkin, who is a brave and noble warrior, fights alongside Bilstein because of his loathing of humans, who nearly destroyed his race during a war. Zelkin is an old acquaintance of Hayato. In his true ending, Zelkin realizes that not all of Earth’s people are cruel and brutal. Although Zelkin tries to give himself up to Hayato and the other earth warriors they do not accept his surrender, with Hayato telling Zelkin that now that they have fought him they know he is not the enemy. Hayato tells Zelkin to go home, thinking that this might bring peace between their two peoples. Zelkin expresses his gratitude and heads off to his home planet on a spaceship from Zeta. Following the Fourth Empire's return to terrorize the universe in the sequel, Zelkin joins the Star Gladiators to redeem himself. His human counterpart in the second game is an American superhero wearing a suit similar to Zelkin, named Eagle.

Gore Gajah - A big-brained pointy-eared tanned Indonesian who fights with a Plasma Mace. Gore, a genius magician, seeks to gain knowledge about Plasma Wizardry and joins Bilstein's Fourth Empire in order to advance his studies into Plasma Power. According to Japanese materials, Gore's alien-esque appearance is due to the side effects of the constant abuse of Plasma Wizardry, which had deformed him into his current state. In his true ending, Gore announces that he is bored with the Fourth Empire, believing that it offered him no challenge and was a waste of his time as he now plans on terrorizing the Earth and its people. The second game has him create an artificial woman named Luca and goes into hiding with her after the Fourth Empire's downfall. By this time, Gore has perfected his Plasma Power to transform him into a handsome man, allowing him to conceal his previous identity.

Dr. Edward Bilstein - The antagonist of the series. A Nobel Prize-winning German-American prestigious physicist and cybernetic mad scientist emperor who fights with a Plasma Broadsword. Bilstein stumbled upon a research document left behind by one of his ancestors. It described Plasma Power and how it could be derived from human emotions. After escaping his prison and forming his "Fourth Empire" organization while placing himself in a powerful cyborg body, Bilstein seeks to conquer the entire universe and establish a new order. Following his first defeat at the hands of Hayato which resulted in him transferring his consciousness to a new cybernetic body, Bilstein's original body, which contained a small part of his consciousness becomes a sentient entity dubbed Ghost Bilstein as it seeks to hunt down and murder Hayato. Additionally, in the second game, he is revealed to have a young daughter named Rain. Ghost Bilstein makes a cameo appearance in Tekkaman Blade's ending in Tatsunoko vs. Capcom: Ultimate All-Stars, when he is attacked by the former and saved by Hayato, who teams up with Tekkaman Blade to destroy him.

Kappah Nosuke - A green-skinned turtle-like humanoid alien from the Planet Kappa, which lies within the Cygnus Galaxy of the universe. He fights with a Plasma Spear. Kappah is based on a Kappa, a type of water sprite that inhabits various ponds and rivers throughout most of Japan. Kappah belongs to a peaceful race that avoids conflict, but he joins the Star Gladiators to fight Bilstein after learning about Bilstein's plans to conquer Earth. Kappah plays very similar to Gerelt barring a few specials, although the characters are in no way related. Also, Kappah does not have a character select screen portrait, and is instead represented by a zucchini pair image. A sub-boss and secret character. Unlike Rimgal, whose absence in the sequel is explained in his ending, the reason why Kappah was excluded in the second game is unknown.

Blood Barbarians - A robust young American expert swordsman who fights with a Plasma Broadsword and has a flying robotic left arm. Blood was taken in by Bilstein at a very young age after Bilstein himself had killed Blood's parents; Blood had the highest amount of Plasma Power stored in his body, and Bilstein wanted to use his potential on his Plasma Power research. Blood plays similarly to Bilstein, barring a few specials. A sub-boss and secret character in the first game. After being freed of Bilstein's control in the first game, Blood joins his newfound allies to get revenge on Bilstein in the sequel. Because his left arm was dependant on Bilstein's existence, Blood is willing to sacrifice his life to save the universe in the second game. The sequel also reveals the existence of Shaker, who serves as one of the many cybernetic clones of Blood.

Super Bilstein - Bilstein's greater form and the true final boss of the first game.

== Development ==
In an interview with Destructoid.com, Capcom's former senior manager of community Seth Killian mentioned that Star Gladiator was originally designed to be a Star Wars game with Star Wars characters.

== Reception ==
Reception

Aggregate score
Aggregator	Score
GameRankings	82% (PS)

Review scores
Publication	Score
Electronic Gaming Monthly	8.25/10 (PS)
GameSpot	7.5/10 (PS)
IGN	8/10
Next Generation	4/5 (ARC); 3/5 (PS)

In Japan, Game Machine listed Star Gladiator on their September 1, 1996 issue as being the sixteenth most-successful arcade game of the month. A Next Generation reviewer called Star Gladiator "a quirky, stylish game that is more subtle than obvious, with innovative gameplay and likeable character design." He especially praised the ability to move, attack, and defend in three dimensions, and the "intuitive and simple" controls for executing these moves. GamePro approved of the game's graphical effects, unique combo system, and characters, and deemed it a satisfying first foray into 3D for Capcom.

The PlayStation conversion also received positive reviews, with critics almost universally praising the characters and the variety of their fighting techniques, as well as the game's graphics, particularly the 3-D animated backgrounds. The most common criticism was that the game is too easy in single-player mode. GamePro said that Star Gladiator's "visual appeal and outstanding control will put other 3D games on their backs." A reviewer for PlayStation Plus also wrote highly of the game, noting that “This is (for the moment) the best fighting game available on any home system.”Next Generation was more moderate, saying that Star Gladiator "is a pretty good game all on its own", but is more of a harbinger of the more outstanding 3D fighting games they anticipated Capcom would put out in the near future. A reviewer for PlayStation Power said that Star Gladiator was “Not quite the stunner you might expect from Capcom” but was “nonetheless a good, solid blade clasher with just enough thoughtfulness to excite their fans.” GameSpot assessed that "All in all, the surreal alien characters, weapon-based fighting, and overall quality make Star Gladiator yet another peal of the thunder in the resounding Capcom storm." IGN praised the graphics, backgrounds and characters, although that the gameplay "isn't as complex or as deep as Tekken 2" but still an enjoyable game overall.

The PlayStation version of Star Gladiator held an aggregate score of 82% on GameRankings based on five reviews.

== See also ==
- Plasma Sword: Nightmare of Bilstein
