= Pseudacanthicus pirarara =

Scientific classification
- Kingdom: Animalia
- Phylum: Chordata
- Class: Actinopterygii
- Order: Siluriformes
- Family: Loricariidae
- Genus: Pseudacanthicus
- Species: P. pirarara

Binomial name
- Pseudacanthicus pirarara Chamon & Sousa, 2018

Species of catfish

Pseudacanthicus pirarara is a species of freshwater ray-finned fish belonging to the family Loricariidae, the suckermouth armoured catfishes, and the subfamily Hypostominae, the suckermouth catfishes. This catfish is found in South America. It was described in 2016 by Carine C. Chamon of the Federal University of Tocantins and Leandro M. de Sousa of the Federal University of Pará, primarily on the basis of the species' unique coloration and patterning. Its specific epithet, pirarara, derives from a Tupi word meaning "macaw-fish", which is frequently used in Brazil to refer to the redtail catfish. It is known that P. pirarara is referred to as the assacu-pirarara by Brazilian fishermen, alluding both to its coloration and its spines, as assacu refers to the spine-covered tree Hura crepitans (also known as the sandbox tree).

== Description ==
P. pirarara is a medium-sized loricariid catfish that reaches at least 23.4 cm (9.2 inches) in standard length, although it has been reported to grow larger. It is typically a grey or brown color with numerous dark blotches that form continuous longitudinal bands, as well as characteristically bright red or orange fins. It is also distinct in possessing dark blotches on the underside of its head and body.

These characteristics differentiate it from other members of the genus Pseudacanthicus which it could be confused with, such as P. pitanga and P. leopardus, which may also possess bright orange fins but lack P. pirarara's characteristic patterning. Similarly to other Pseudacanthicus species, P. pirarara sports multiple longitudinal rows of spines.

== Distribution and habitat ==
P. pirarara is a freshwater fish endemic to the Xingu River basin in Brazil. It typically occurs in rocky environments with a swift current, where it can often be seen hiding beneath rocks.

== Ecology ==
Unlike many loricariids, P. pirarara is a carnivorous species (feeding mainly on small invertebrates) known to be solitary and territorial. It is also believed to be nocturnal, taking shelter during the day.

== In the aquarium ==
In the aquarium trade, P. pirarara is often referred to either as the scarlet cactus pleco or by its associated L-number, which is L-025. The species is noted to be reclusive, requiring large hiding spots in its aquarium, although it is also territorial and very aggressive towards similar fish. While it is primarily carnivorous, providing P. pirarara with occasional vegetables is recommended. It has been successfully bred in captivity.

== In popular culture ==
In the scuba diving video game Endless Ocean 2, which was released for the Wii, a fish referred to in-game as the scarlet-trimmed pleco appears as one of several animals inhabiting the game's Cortica River area (a fictitious tributary of the Amazon River, with a confluence at longitude 53° west). While the identity of the species is only given as "Pseudacanthicus sp.", it bears a striking resemblance to P. pirarara, which was not scientifically described until seven years after the game's initial release.

P. pirarara was, however, previously known in the aquarium trade and as such is likely to have been the basis for the game's Pseudacanthicus. The species was not featured in the series' first game, nor did it appear in the Everblue series, which is often seen as a spiritual predecessor to the games, as neither of the Everblue games included a river-themed area, nor did the first Endless Ocean.
