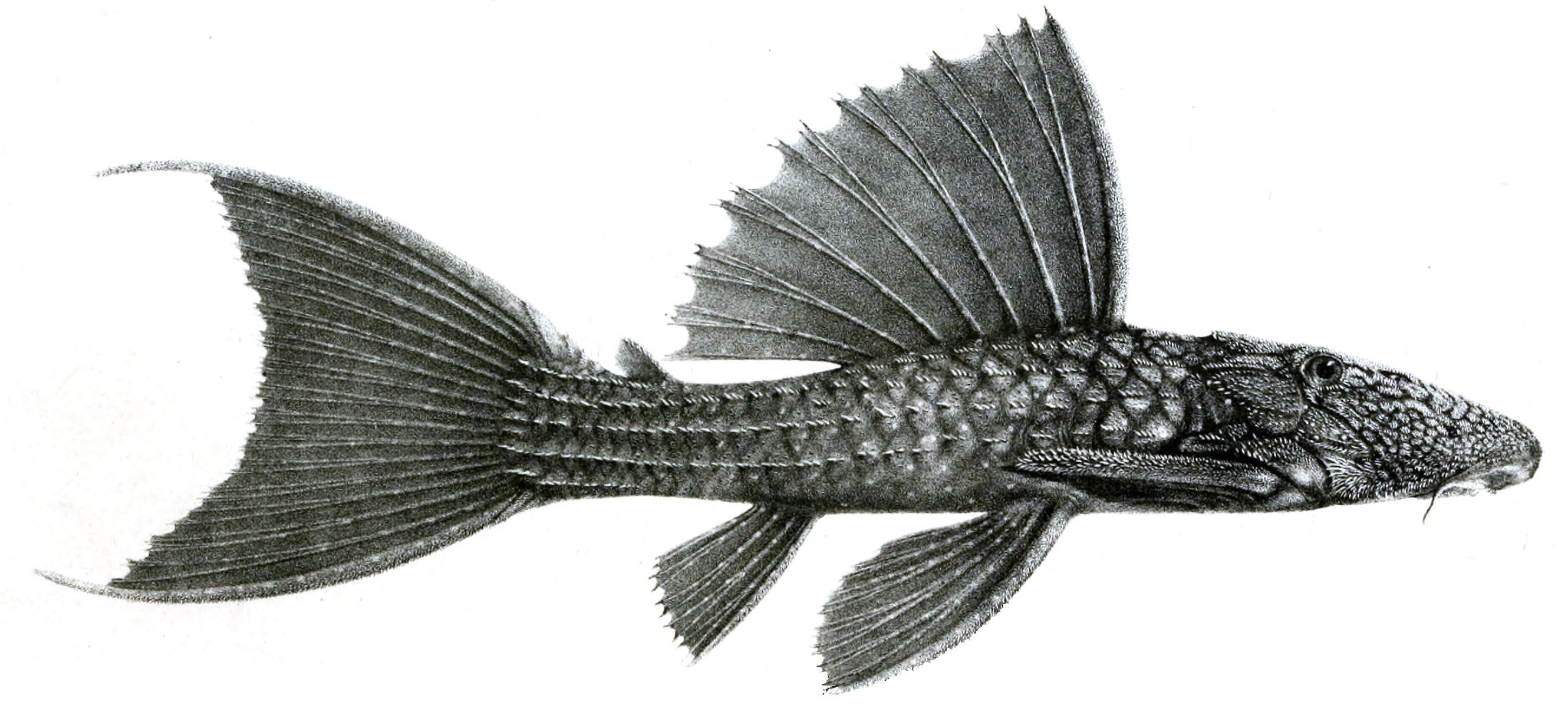

Conservation status
- Data Deficient (IUCN 3.1)

Scientific classification
- Kingdom: Animalia
- Phylum: Chordata
- Class: Actinopterygii
- Order: Siluriformes
- Family: Loricariidae
- Subfamily: Hypostominae
- Genus: Pseudacanthicus
- Species: P. fordii

Binomial name
- Pseudacanthicus fordii (Günther, 1868)

Synonyms
- Chaetostomus fordii Günther, 1868

= Pseudacanthicus fordii =

Species of fish

Pseudacanthicus fordii is a species of freshwater ray-finned fish belonging to the family Loricariidae, the suckermouth armoured catfishes, and the subfamily Hypostominae, the suckermouth catfishes. This catfish is endemic to Suriname but it is known only from the type material, the provenanceof which is uncertain. This taxon may be a synonym of P. serratus. This species is known to reavh a total length of 23 cm (9.1 in).
