= Akira Kurabayashi =

Japanese video game designer (1969/1970–2026)

- 倉林 晶
- Kurabayashi holding a great horned owl in a memorial photo posted by Arika Vice President, Ichirou Mihara.
- Born: 1969 or 1970
- Died: 14 November 2026 (aged 56)
- Occupations: Video game designer; programmer; director
- Years active: 1994–2026
- Notable work: Endless Ocean; Darius Gaiden; Street Fighter EX

Akira Kurabayashi (倉林 晶, Kurabayashi Akira) (1969 or 1970 – 14 November 2026) was a Japanese video game designer, programmer and director. He worked for the majority of his career at Arika and was the head of the software development at the studio. Kurabayashi is most known for his work on games such as Endless Ocean, Darius Gaiden and the Street Fighter EX series.

== Career ==
Kurabayashi would start his career at Taito as a game designer and programmer for games such as Darius Gaiden and Fighters' Impact. He would then leave Taito and join the newly starting studio Arika, where he would stay for the rest of his career.

In 2007, Kurabayashi would direct Endless Ocean along with its 2009 sequel, Endless Ocean: Blue World. Fellow Arika developer, Ichirou Mihara, claimed that Kurabayashi created the games due to his hobby of underwater diving.

In the 2010s, he would become a board director and the head of software development at Arika. He would take on programming for various titles in cooperation with Nintendo such as the 2011 3D Classics re-releases of NES titles Excitebike and Kirby's Adventure. He would once again work as a programmer for Nintendo's Nintendo Switch Online titles: Tetris 99 and Pac-Man 99. Arika also stated that Kurabayashi had worked on previously teased colloboration project between the company and SNK.

== Death ==
Kurabayashi died from sudden heart failure on 14 November 2026, at the age of 56. A statement by Arika president, Akira Nishitani, was released three days later, on 17 November.

== Ludography ==
Game Credits
Year	Game	Role	Ref(s)
1994	Darius Gaiden	Programmer, Game Designer	
1994	Elevator Action Returns	Programming Support	
1996	Street Fighter EX	Programmer	
1996	Fighters' Impact	Programmer, Game Designer	
1998	Tetris: The Grand Master	Programmer	
1998	Fighting Layer	Programmer	
1998	Street Fighter EX2	Programmer	
1999	Cardcaptor Sakura	Technical Advisor	
2000	Street Fighter EX3	Programmer	
2001	Everblue	Programmer	
2003	Mega Man Network Transmission	Project Leader	
2006	Druaga Online: The Story of Aon	Programmer	
2007	Endless Ocean	Director	
2009	Endless Ocean: Blue World	Director	
2011	3D Classics: Kirby's Adventure	Programmer	
2011	3D Classics: Excitebike	Director, Programmer	
2012	Tekken 3D: Prime Edition	Programmer	
2018	Fighting EX Layer	Programmer	
2019	Tetris 99	Programmer	
2021	Pac-Man 99	Programmer	
2024	Endless Ocean Luminous	Programmer	
Cancelled	Vertexer	Programmer	
