= Nine-ball (disambiguation) =

Nine-ball (or nine-ball, 9 ball, 9-ball and other variant spellings) is a pool (pocket billiards) game, played with nine object balls, of which the 9 ball is the game-winning ball. It may also refer to:

- 9 ball, the pool (pocket billiards) ball numbered "9", and colored with a yellow stripe
- 9-ball, a nine-dimensional n-ball in mathematics
- Nineball Island, the hub of Endless Ocean: Blue World
