= Bust-a-Move Universe =

2011 video game

- North American version cover art
- Developers: Taito; Arika
- Publisher: Square Enix
- Series: Puzzle Bobble
- Platform: Nintendo 3DS
- Release: JP: February 26, 2011; NA: March 27, 2011; EU: April 22, 2011; AU: April 28, 2011
- Genre: Puzzle
- Modes: Single-player, multiplayer

Bust-a-Move Universe, known in Japan as Tobidasu! Puzzle Bobble 3D (Note: Japanese: とびだす!パズルボブル 3D, Hepburn: Tobidasu! Pazuru Boburu 3D), and in the PAL region as Puzzle Bobble Universe, is a puzzle video game developed by Taito and Arika and published by Square Enix for the Nintendo 3DS. It was released in Japan as a launch title on February 26, 2011, and was released in North America on March 27.

== Gameplay ==
Bust-a-Move Universe is similar to its predecessors in that the goal is to connect three bubbles of the same color to make them disappear. Different modes of play include boss battles, 100-second, 300-second, or Challenge Mode. Bubble dragon duo Bub and Bob travel the universe in a spaceship as doors open on planets, which release bubbles that turn into space debris. Bub must save Bob from being captured.

== Development ==
First shown at Nintendo World 2011, it was later revealed to be a Japanese launch title.

== Reception ==
Reception

Aggregate score
Aggregator	Score
Metacritic	49/100

Review scores
Publication	Score
1Up.com	D+
Famitsu	24/40
Game Informer	6/10
GamePro	3.5/5
GameRevolution	D+
GameSpot	5/10
GameTrailers	4.6/10
IGN	6/10
Nintendo Life	5/10
Nintendo World Report	4.5/10
Official Nintendo Magazine	60%
Pocket Gamer	2.5/5
Common Sense Media	3/5

The game received "generally unfavorable reviews" according to the review aggregation website Metacritic. Nintendo Life said that the game was "a disappointingly thin package as it offers virtually nothing new to the series or long-time fans." In Japan, Famitsu gave it a score of all four sixes for a total of 24 out of 40.
