= Teddy Together =

2013 video game

- European cover art
- Developer: Arika
- Publishers: JP: Namco Bandai Games; EU: Nintendo
- Platform: Nintendo 3DS
- Release: Kuma-Tomo: JP: June 20, 2013; Teddy Together: EU: July 1, 2016; AU: July 2, 2016
- Genre: Life simulation
- Mode: Single-player

Teddy Together, released as Kuma-Tomo (Note: Japanese: クマ・トモ, Hepburn: Kuma・Tomo) in Japan, is a 2013 life simulation video game developed by Arika and published by Namco Bandai Games for the Nintendo 3DS handheld video game console. The game was released by Nintendo in Europe on July 1, 2016, and Australia and New Zealand on July 2. The game is based around the player taking care of a teddy bear. The game was praised for being a good game for younger audiences, although some Western critics found the bear's overly cheery appearance to be off-putting.

== Gameplay ==
The game involves the player interacting with a sentient teddy bear, with the end-goal being to forge a trusting friendship with the bear in order to discover the purpose behind his existence and his mysterious key. Gameplay involves elements of Miitomo, Nintendogs, Animal Crossing and Cooking Mama. The player uses the buttons, touch screen, and microphone to play mini-games that simulate various daily tasks such as cooking food or tending to a garden. Doing activities earn the player coins that can be used to purchase items or clothing for the teddy bear, and additional coins can be earned through the use of Nintendo-themed amiibo, the latter feature being exclusive the Western version of the game. The teddy bear also frequently asks the player questions about their self or their personal preferences, which is saved and mentioned back to the player in future parts of the game. The game has no online connectivity to the internet however, making the information given private to that particular copy of the video game.

== Development and release ==
The game was first released under the title of Kuma-Tomo in Japan in June 2013. The game was announced for English localization almost three years after its initial release, in May 2016, an irregularly long time for games to be released between regions in the industry. The game was released in Europe on July 1, 2016, and Australia and New Zealand on July 2. While the 2013 Japanese release had been published by Bandai Namco, the English language release was published by Nintendo. The game's Western release was given a focused advertisement campaign, especially on children's television channels in the UK.

== Reception ==
Nintendo Life gave the game a score of 7/10, praising the game wealth of content for children to play with their parents, concluding that "there is so much to be explored... A lot of kids' games can be rushed through, but the level of detail and effort put into Teddy Together makes it a solid choice for young gamers that enjoy the likes of Nintendogs and Tomodachi Life. Multiple journalists, including ones at Nintendo Life, Eurogamer, and Kotaku criticized the bear's overly cute look and voice acting to be inadvertently creepy and off-putting. Kotaku described his appearance as if Paddington Bear had been a character in the horror film The Grudge.

The game sold 12,705 copies at retail in its first week of sales in June 2013, making it the fifth best-selling video game in Japan for that week. Teddy Together has sold over 350,000 copies worldwide as of June 2018.
