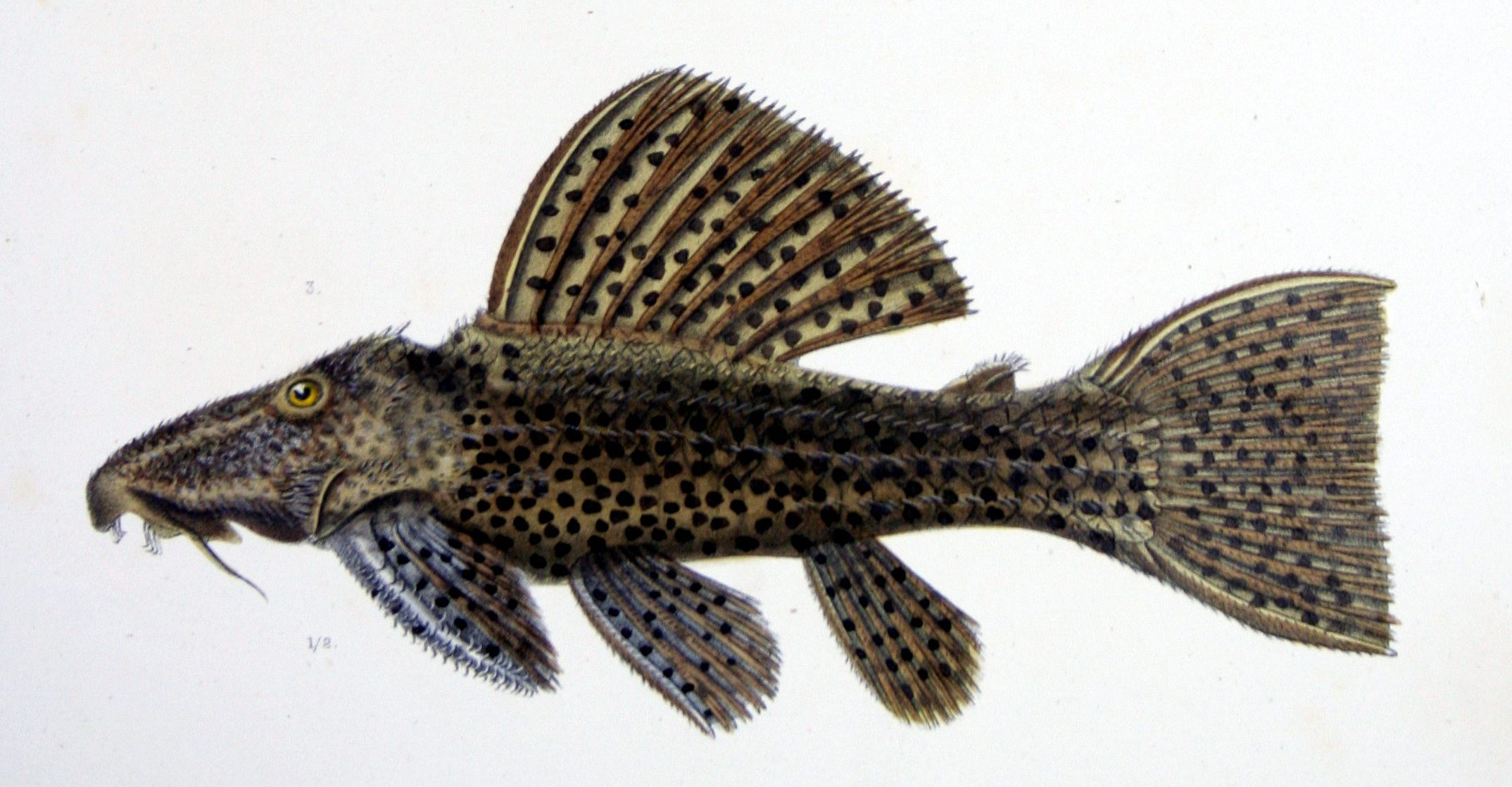

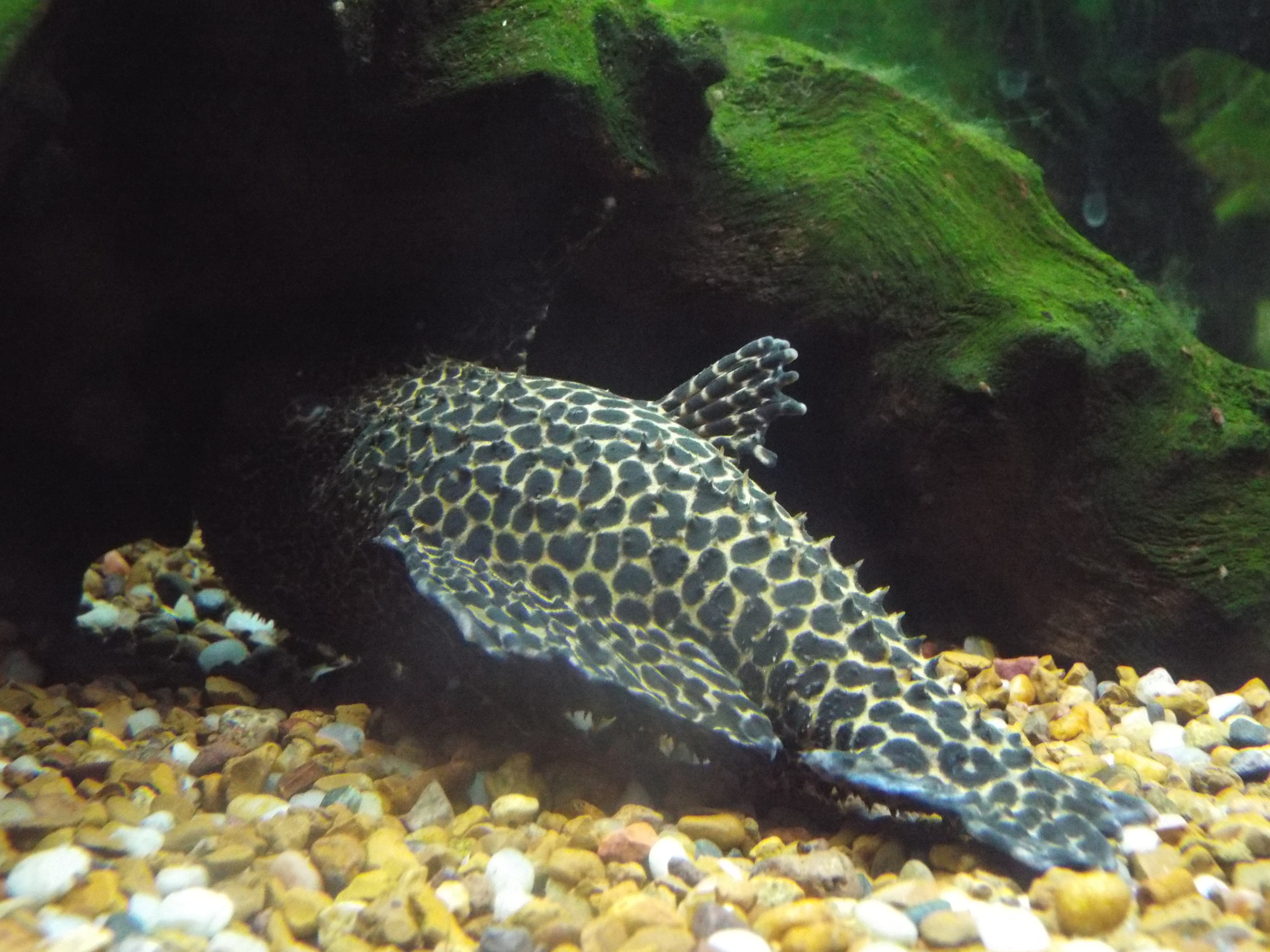
- Pseudacanthicus spinosus above, Pseudacanthicus leopardus below

Scientific classification
- Kingdom: Animalia
- Phylum: Chordata
- Class: Actinopterygii
- Order: Siluriformes
- Family: Loricariidae
- Subfamily: Hypostominae
- Genus: Pseudacanthicus; Bleeker, 1862

Type species
- Hypostomus serratus Valenciennes, 1840

Synonyms
- Stoneiella Fowler, 1914

= Pseudacanthicus =

Genus of fishes

Pseudacanthicus is a genus of medium to large-sized freshwater ray-finned fishes belonging to the family Loricariidae, the suckermouth armoured catfishes, and the subfamily Hypostominae, the suckermouth catfishes. The catfishes in this genus are found in South America, where found in the Amazon and Orinoco basins, as well as rivers of the Guianas. They are primarily found in fast-flowing waters, sometimes relatively deep. They are sometimes kept in aquariums.

== Species ==
Pseudananthicus contains the following valid species:

- Pseudacanthicus fordii (Günther, 1868)
- Pseudacanthicus histrix (Valenciennes, 1840)
- Pseudacanthicus leopardus (Fowler, 1914)
- Pseudacanthicus major Chamon & Costa e Silva, 2018
- Pseudacanthicus nyktos Lopes, Sousa & Chamon, 2024
- Pseudacanthicus pirarara Chamon & L. M. de Sousa, 2016
- Pseudacanthicus pitanga Chamon, 2015
- Pseudacanthicus serratus (Valenciennes, 1840)
- Pseudacanthicus spinosus (Castelnau, 1855)

Some of these were only recently described and undescribed species probably remain. In contrast, P. fordii is likely a synonym of P. serratus, and P. histrix likely a synonym of P. spinosus.

== Description ==
Species of Pseudacanthicus are medium to large spiny loricariids, up to 90 cm (3 ft) in standard length. They have a diverse range of colour patterns, typically light to dark grey or brown, often with black spots, which may result in a netted appearance. The fins and body may have orange-red sections or a red wash. Colouration varies between rivers and can also change throughout the lifetime of a single individual. The abdomen is covered in small plates in adults. The caudal fin is forked and may have filaments. The jaws are short, forming an acute angle at their union; the teeth are few and stout. The adipose fin is present.

== Conservation ==
Some of the species in the genus are threatened by mining, deforestation and especially the building of dams. Like many other loricariids, Pseudacanthicus are found in flowing waters with high levels of oxygen and dams typically flood these, transforming them to reservoirs. In some regions where dams have been built, the local populations of Pseudacanthicus have seriously decreased or even disappeared. In contrast, although some species often are caught for the aquarium trade, this does not appear to represent a serious threat to them.
