= Pseudacanthicus major =

Scientific classification
- Kingdom: Animalia
- Phylum: Chordata
- Class: Actinopterygii
- Order: Siluriformes
- Family: Loricariidae
- Genus: Pseudacanthicus
- Species: P. major

Binomial name
- Pseudacanthicus major Chamon & Costa e Silva, 2018

Species of catfish

Pseudacanthicus major is a species of freshwater ray-finned fish belonging to the family Loricariidae, the suckermouth armoured catfishes, and the subfamily Hypostominae, the suckermouth catfishes. This catfish is endemic to Brazil where it occurs in the Tocantins River basin. The species is notably large for a loricariid, reaching 60 cm (23.6 inches) SL.

P. major was described in 2018 by Carine C. Chamon (of the Federal University of Tocantins) and Thiago Costa e Silva on the basis of coloration and morphology. Its specific epithet derives from Latin and refers to its large size. It appears in the aquarium trade, where it is usually referred to either as the giant cactus pleco or by its L-number, which is L-186. FishBase does not list this species.
