= Endless Ocean Luminous =

2024 video game

- Cover art
- Developer: Arika
- Publisher: Nintendo
- Directors: Akito Kitamura; Ryuichi Nakada
- Producers: Shinji Watanabe; Akira Kinashi; Shinya Saito
- Programmers: Hitoshi Hirashima; Akira Kurabayashi
- Artist: Jun Hosoba
- Composers: Shinji Hosoe; Ayako Saso; Takahiro Eguchi
- Platform: Nintendo Switch
- Release: May 2, 2024
- Genres: Adventure, simulation
- Modes: Single-player, multiplayer

Endless Ocean Luminous (Note: Japanese: フォーエバーブルー ルミナス, Hepburn: Fōebāburū ruminasu; lit. "Forever Blue Luminous") is a 2024 adventure simulation game developed by Arika and published by Nintendo for the Nintendo Switch. As the third game in the Endless Ocean series, Luminous marks the first installment since 2009's Endless Ocean 2: Adventures of the Deep for the Wii.

Similar to previous entries, the player takes the role of a scuba diver tasked with encountering and documenting marine life. Additionally, the game features online multiplayer that allows groups of up to 30 players to explore together. The game was announced in a February 2024 Nintendo Direct Partner Showcase and released on May 2, 2024 to mixed reviews.

== Gameplay ==
Endless Ocean Luminous tasks the player with exploring the Veiled Sea, a fictional, unexplored region, in order to encounter and document marine life. The game itself has over 500 species to learn about, including creatures that are deemed mythical or extinct such as the Mosasaurus. Outside of marine life, the player can also explore underwater structures such as temples and shipwrecks. Luminous features a new mechanic for the series in which the region will change with each dive the player goes on.

Unlike the multiplayer modes in previous installments, the game allows groups of up to 30 online players to embark on dives together. Players in groups can share their findings and communicate between one another via emotes.

== Development ==
Endless Ocean Luminous is the third game in the Endless Ocean series after Endless Ocean (2007) and Endless Ocean 2: Adventures of the Deep (2009). The game was developed by Japanese video game company Arika and published by Nintendo for the Nintendo Switch. Luminous was first announced at the end of a Nintendo Direct Partner Showcase in late February 2024 and was given the release date of May 2, 2024. Music and sound effects were created by the music production company SuperSweep, including Shinji Hosoe, Ayako Saso, and Takahiro Eguchi.

== Reception ==
Reception

Aggregate scores
Aggregator	Score
Metacritic	60/100 (Note: Based on 64 reviews)
OpenCritic	25% recommend

Review scores
Publication	Score
Digital Trends	2.5/5
Famitsu	32/40
GameSpot	3/10
HobbyConsolas	80/100
IGN	4/10
Jeuxvideo.com	11/20
Nintendo Life	5/10
PC Games (DE)	5/10
PCMag	3/5
Shacknews	7/10
TechRadar	4/5
The Games Machine (Italy)	6.5/10
Video Games Chronicle	3/5

Endless Ocean Luminous was released to a score of 60/100 on review aggregator Metacritic, indicating mixed to average reviews. Fellow review aggregator OpenCritic assessed that the game received weak approval, being recommended by 25% of critics.

Andrew Webster of The Verge gave Endless Ocean Luminous a positive review, describing the gameplay as basic but fun nonetheless. He described the game as at its best when played alone and exploring with no goal in mind, and considered the story mode and Mystery Board "mundane."

Logan Plant of IGN gave a much more critical review, describing it as "boring, tedious and downright aggravating." The story and procedurally generated map drew particular criticism, the latter of which he described as a "randomly generated underwater purgatory." Plant recognizes that while it "had the potential to be a cool education tool [it] doesn't give enough information about each species for it to meaningfully achieve that".

Video Games Chronicle's Chris Scullion's praised the variety of creatures available in the game, but compared it unfavorably to earlier titles in the series, saying that it had "lost some of its magic." Scullion criticized the game's story, saying that those who enjoyed the story of the first two games and plan to buy Luminous for that reason "really shouldn't bother". Despite this criticism, Scullion concludes by saying that while Luminous is "not the same Endless Ocean fans will be familiar with, ... it's a pleasant enough experience in its own unique way."
