= Everblue 2 =

2002 video game

- North American cover art
- Developer: Arika
- Publisher: Capcom
- Directors: Yasuo Udo; Keizō Katō
- Producers: Tatsuya Minami; Ichirō Mihara
- Composers: Yousuke Yasui; Kaori Ohkoshi
- Platform: PlayStation 2
- Release: JP: August 8, 2002; NA: February 25, 2003; EU: March 7, 2003
- Genre: Adventure
- Mode: Single player

Everblue 2 (エバーブルー2, Ebāburū Tsū) is a scuba diving adventure game. It is the sequel to the game Everblue. Arika, the developers of both games, followed it with the spiritual sequel Endless Ocean, for the Wii.

The game was also released in North America (with the title still indicating it's a sequel), while the first game was not.

== Plot ==
Leo is a diver who sails through a fictional treacherous Caribbean sea with his friends. Their ship sinks in a huge storm and they swim to a nearby island. There, they meet a group of scuba divers called The Amigos. While on the island, Leo and the Amigos discover that a nefarious aquatic salvaging company named SeaDross is searching for an ancient pirate treasure called Erebos. Leo and his friends race against time to locate the Erebos, diving to several underwater locations including: a sunken Ferry, a crashed 747, an old cruise ship, a pirate Galleon and an ancient underwater city called Telospolis. The search is cut short when it is discovered that SeaDross has discovered Erebos in Telospolis, however, they failed to realize the malevolent powers contained within the relic causing their submarine (and Erebos) to sink to the ocean depths. At this point the ocean begins to turn stormy as the power of Erebos runs out of control. Leo eventually ventures to the sunken submarine to recover the Erebos and is successful in returning it to Telospolis, calming the oceans. Leo returns to the island as a hero, but his adventures as a diver may just be starting.

== Gameplay ==
The player, Leo, earns money by finding precious materials with their metal, glass, wood, clay, and stone sonars, and looting artifacts from shipwrecks. This money can be used to buy equipment allowing a player access to deeper and more challenging dives. Over time the player unlocks dive sites such as a sunken freighter, a downed airplane, a pirate ship, a sunken luxury liner, a submarine and an undersea temple.

== Reception ==
Reception

Aggregate score
Aggregator	Score
Metacritic	59/100

Review scores
Publication	Score
Electronic Gaming Monthly	6.5/10
Famitsu	8/10, 8/10, 8/10, 8/10
Game Informer	8.75/10
GamePro	4/5
GameRevolution	C−
GameSpot	6.1/10
GameSpy	4/5
GameZone	7/10
IGN	5.7/10
Official U.S. PlayStation Magazine	3/5

Everblue 2 was released in Japan for the PlayStation 2 on August 8, 2002.

On release, Everblue 2 received "mixed" reviews according to the review aggregation website Metacritic. Critics were divided on the speed of the game, with some praising it for its ambiance while others criticized it for being slow. although GameNOW gave it a C−.
