= Pseudacanthicus histrix =

Conservation status
- Least Concern (IUCN 3.1)

Scientific classification
- Kingdom: Animalia
- Phylum: Chordata
- Class: Actinopterygii
- Order: Siluriformes
- Family: Loricariidae
- Subfamily: Hypostominae
- Genus: Pseudacanthicus
- Species: P. histrix

Binomial name
- Pseudacanthicus histrix (Valenciennes, 1840)

Synonyms
- Rinelepis histrix Valenciennes, 1840; Loricaria spinosae Ferreira, 1922

Species of fish

Pseudacanthicus histrix is a species of freshwater ray-finned fish belonging to the family Loricariidae, the suckermouth armoured catfishes, and the subfamily Hypostominae, the suckermouth catfishes. This catfish is endemic to Brazil where it occurs in the lower Amazon basin in the states of Pará and Amazonas. This species grows to a total length of 90 cm (3 ft). P. histrix has incredibly elongated odontodes that form a brush on the anterior margin of the pectoral fin spine in breeding males; however, sexual dimorphism has not been reported for the other Pseudacanthicus species.
