= Metal Torrent =

2009 video game

- Developer: Arika (Note: Additional work by Nintendo SPD.)
- Publisher: Nintendo
- Platform: Nintendo DSi
- Release: JP: September 2, 2009; EU: May 7, 2010; NA: May 24, 2010
- Genre: Bullet hell
- Mode: Single-player

Metal Torrent (Note: Japanese: あぁ無情 刹那, Hepburn: Ā Mujō Setsuna) is a bullet hell video game developed by Arika and published by Nintendo for the Nintendo DSi's DSiWare service. It was released in Japan on September 2, 2009, in Europe on May 7, 2010, and North America on May 24, 2010.

Metal Torrent received mixed reviews from critics. Despite its obscurity, the game was review bombed on Metacritic with positive reviews, briefly becoming the highest user-rated video game on the website.

== Gameplay ==
The player controls a spaceship which traverses levels while defeating enemies and avoiding bullets. Two modes are available, allowing the player to choose between enemies flying in fixed or randomized patterns. Two spaceships, the Red Orion and the Blue Nova, are available, differing in shooting range and hit points. By defeating the enemies and eventually a boss enemy at the end of each level, they drop cubes that grand extra points, which increase in value as long as they are collected consecutively.

== Reception ==
Marcel van Duyn of Nintendo Life gave the game a 7/10 score, praising its accessibility and graphics, though he criticized the game's extremely short length and lack of variety. Daemon Hatfield of IGN gave the game a 7/10 score, praising its gameplay but criticizing its lack of content and disparity in difficulty between the two modes.
