= Arika =

Japanese video game developer

Arika Co. Ltd.
- Native name: 株式会社アリカ
- Romanized name: Kabushiki gaisha Arika
- Formerly: ARMtech K.K
- Type: Kabushiki gaisha
- Industry: Video games
- Founded: November 1, 1995; 30 years ago
- Headquarters: Shinagawa, Tokyo, Japan
- Key people: Akira Nishitani (President)
- Products: Street Fighter EX series Tetris: The Grand Master series
- Number of employees: 50
- Website: arika.co.jp

Arika (株式会社アリカ, Kabushiki gaisha Arika) is a Japanese video game developer and publisher. It was formed in 1995 by former Capcom employees. It was originally known as ARMtech K.K, but was later named Arika. The name of the company is an anagram of the name of the company's founder, Akira Nishitani, who along with Akira Yasuda, created Street Fighter II. Arika's first game was Street Fighter EX. It was successful and was followed up with two updates (Street Fighter EX + and EX + α), and its two sequels Street Fighter EX2 and Street Fighter EX3. In 2018, it released a spiritual successor to both Street Fighter EX and Fighting Layer (published by Namco), titled Fighting EX Layer. From 2019 to 2021, Arika collaborated with Nintendo to create the battle royale games Tetris 99, Super Mario Bros. 35, and with Bandai Namco for Pac-Man 99. Arika is also known for the Tetris: The Grand Master series, the Dr. Mario series, starting with Dr. Mario Online Rx, and the Endless Ocean series.

== History ==
Arika was founded in November 1995. During the first month of its existence, the company was focused strictly on research.

In July 2011, a video from an Arika 3DS test project, called Fighting Sample, was released, featuring Hokuto and Kairi from the Street Fighter EX series. Further screenshots were released, showing characters Blair, Doctrine Dark and Shadow Geist, but the project was later cancelled. Later in May 2016, another video showcasing Nanase, Allen, Darun and Skullomania was released as a sample test video, with no plans for a future release. In April 2017, Fighting EX Layer, which seems to be the "evolution" of Fighting Sample was announced as a video for April Fools, and later confirmed to be actually a game in development. Fighting EX Layer is a spiritual successor to both Street Fighter EX series and Fighting Layer, an arcade-only fighting game by Arika.

Tetris: The Grand Master 4: Masters of Round has been shown to be in development multiple times since as early as 2009. However, it was cancelled later on due to various reasons, including copyright infringements with regard to emulation and various fan-developed clones of TGM, most notably Texmaster2009. The Grand Master 2015 was announced and playtested in both Japan and the United States in June 2015. This playtest was not licensed by The Tetris Company. In late 2024, Arika officially announced Tetris: The Grandmaster 4: Absolute Eye, scheduled for March 2025.

Not long after completion, a Tetris the Absolute: The Grand Master 2 PLUS port to the PlayStation 2 was shown to be in development. However, for unknown reasons, the port was not licensed and was never released.

Arika collaborated with Bandai Namco Entertainment to help co-develop Tekken 8. This collaboration also lead to it handling update patch(es) on Tekken 7.

== Games developed ==
- Street Fighter EX (1996, arcade)
- Street Fighter EX Plus (1997, arcade)
- Street Fighter EX Plus α (1997, PlayStation)
- Street Fighter EX2 (1998, arcade)
- Tetris: The Grand Master (1998, arcade)
- Fighting Layer (1998, arcade)
- Street Fighter EX2 Plus (1998, arcade and 1999, Playstation)
- Street Fighter EX3 (2000, PlayStation 2)
- Tetris: The Grand Master 2 - The Absolute (2000, arcade)
- Tetris with Cardcaptor Sakura Eternal Heart (2000, PlayStation)
- Everblue (2001, PlayStation 2)
- Technictix (テクニクティクス) (2001, PlayStation 2)
- Technicbeat (2002, arcade)
- Everblue 2 (2002, PlayStation 2)
- DoDonPachi Dai Ou Jou (2003, PlayStation 2)
- Mega Man Network Transmission (2003, GameCube, its only game for the console)
- The Nightmare of Druaga: Fushigino Dungeon (2004, PlayStation 2, collaborated with Chunsoft)
- Tetris: The Grand Master 3 - Terror Instinct (2005, arcade)
- Super Dragon Ball Z (2005, arcade & PlayStation 2, collaborated with Crafts & Meister)
- Tetris: The Grand Master Ace (2005, Xbox 360)
- Tsubasa Chronicle (2005, Nintendo DS)
- Jewelry Master (2006–2007, Windows)
- Endless Ocean (2007, Wii)
- Ketsui Death Label (2008, Nintendo DS)
- Dr. Mario Online Rx (2008, Wii through WiiWare)
- Dr. Mario Express (2008, Nintendo DSi through DSiWare)
- Jewelry Master Twinkle (2009, Xbox 360 through Xbox Live Indie Games)
- Metal Torrent (2009/2010, Nintendo DSi through DSiWare)
- Endless Ocean 2: Adventures of the Deep (2009/2010, Wii)
- Jewelry Master Twinkle Light (2010, Xbox 360 through Xbox Live Indie Games)
- Bust-A-Move Universe (2011, Nintendo 3DS)
- AR Games (2011, Pre-Installed on the Nintendo 3DS)
- 3D Classics Excitebike (2011, Nintendo 3DS through Nintendo 3DS eShop)
- 3D Classics Xevious (2011, Nintendo 3DS through Nintendo 3DS eShop)
- 3D Classics Urban Champion (2011, Nintendo 3DS through Nintendo 3DS eShop)
- 3D Classics Twinbee (2011, Nintendo 3DS through Nintendo 3DS eShop)
- 3D Classics Kirby Adventure (2011, Nintendo 3DS through Nintendo 3DS eShop)
- 3D Classics Kid Icarus (2012, Nintendo 3DS through Nintendo 3DS eShop)
- Tekken 3D: Prime Edition (2012, Nintendo 3DS)
- Teddy Together (2013, Nintendo 3DS. Bandai-Namco)
- Dr. Luigi (2013, Wii U through Nintendo eShop)
- Dr. Mario: Miracle Cure (2015, Nintendo 3DS through Nintendo eShop)
- Fighting EX Layer (2018, PlayStation 4, Windows)
- Tetris 99 (2019, Nintendo Switch through Nintendo eShop)
- Super Mario Bros. 35 (2020, Nintendo Switch through Nintendo eShop)
- Pac-Man 99 (2021, Nintendo Switch through Nintendo eShop)
- Fighting EX Layer Another Dash (2021, Nintendo Switch)
- Chocobo GP (2022, Nintendo Switch)
- Tekken 7 (2023, PlayStation 4, Xbox One, Windows)
- Tekken 8 (2024, PlayStation 5, Xbox Series X/S, Windows)
- Endless Ocean Luminous (2024, Nintendo Switch)
- Tetris: The Grandmaster 4 - Absolute Eye - (2025, Windows)
