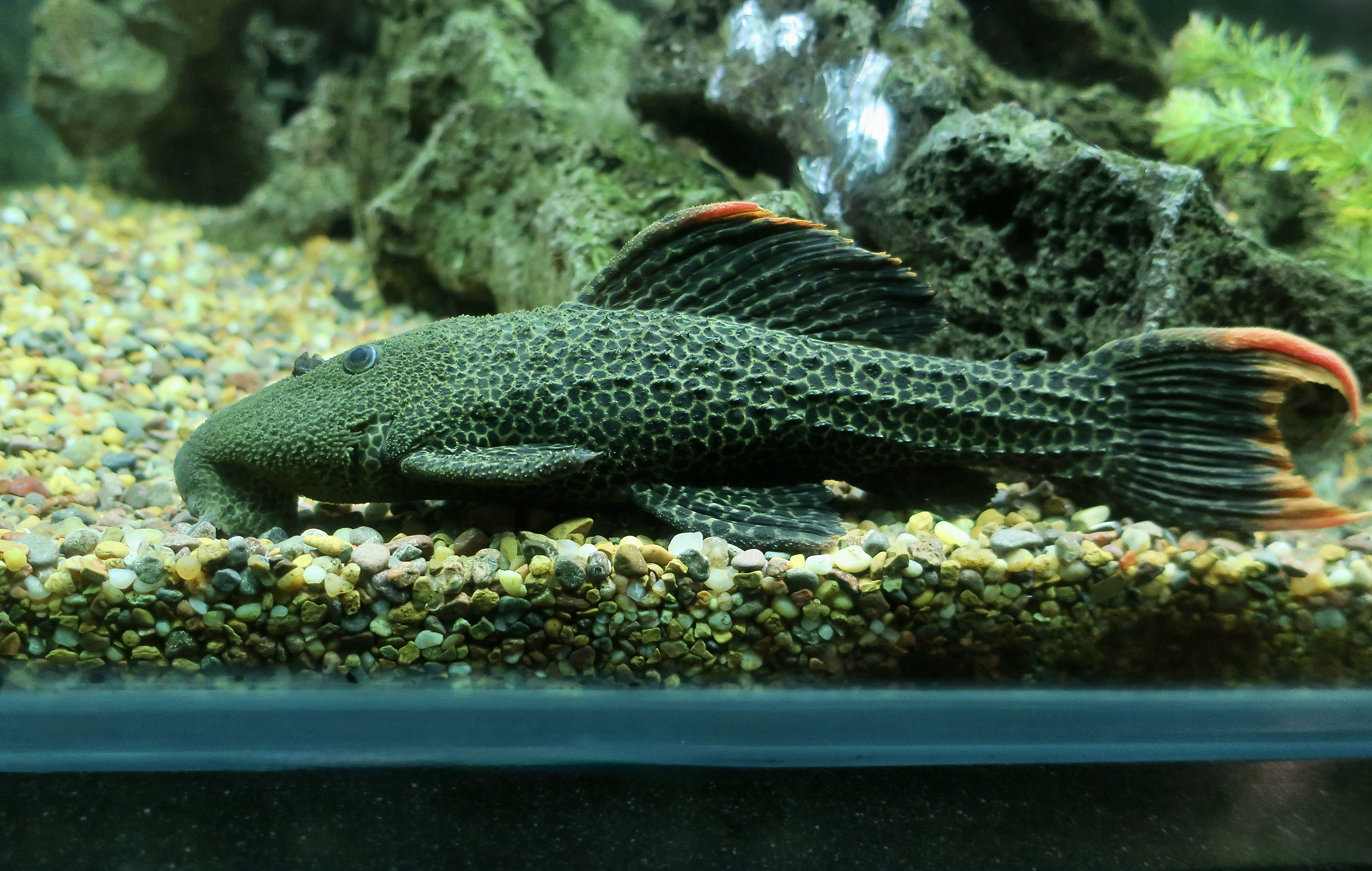
- At New York Aquarium.

Conservation status
- Least Concern (IUCN 3.1)

Scientific classification
- Kingdom: Animalia
- Phylum: Chordata
- Class: Actinopterygii
- Order: Siluriformes
- Family: Loricariidae
- Subfamily: Hypostominae
- Genus: Pseudacanthicus
- Species: P. leopardus

Binomial name
- Pseudacanthicus leopardus (Fowler, 1914)

Synonyms
- Stoneiella leopardus Fowler, 1914

= Pseudacanthicus leopardus =

Species of fish

Pseudacanthicus leopardus is a species of freshwater ray-finned fish belonging to the family Loricariidae, the suckermouth armoured catfishes, and the subfamily Hypostominae, the suckermouth catfishes. This catfish is found in the Rupununi, Essequibo, Takutu basins in Guyana, and the Negro and Branco basin in Brazil. This species grows to a total length of 15 cm (5.9 in).
