= Pseudacanthicus serratus =

Conservation status
- Least Concern (IUCN 3.1)

Scientific classification
- Kingdom: Animalia
- Phylum: Chordata
- Class: Actinopterygii
- Order: Siluriformes
- Family: Loricariidae
- Subfamily: Hypostominae
- Genus: Pseudacanthicus
- Species: P. serratus

Binomial name
- Pseudacanthicus serratus (Valenciennes, 1840)

Synonyms
- Hypostomus serratus Valenciennes, 1840

Species of fish

Pseudacanthicus serratus is a species of freshwater ray-finned fish belonging to the family Loricariidae, the suckermouth armoured catfishes, and the subfamily Hypostominae, the suckermouth catfishes. This catfish is found in Guyana, French Guiana and Suriname where it is occurs in the middle reaches of some coastal river drainages where local fishermen state that it can be found in deep, rocky areas of main riverbeds. This species grows to a standard length of 32 cm (13 in).
