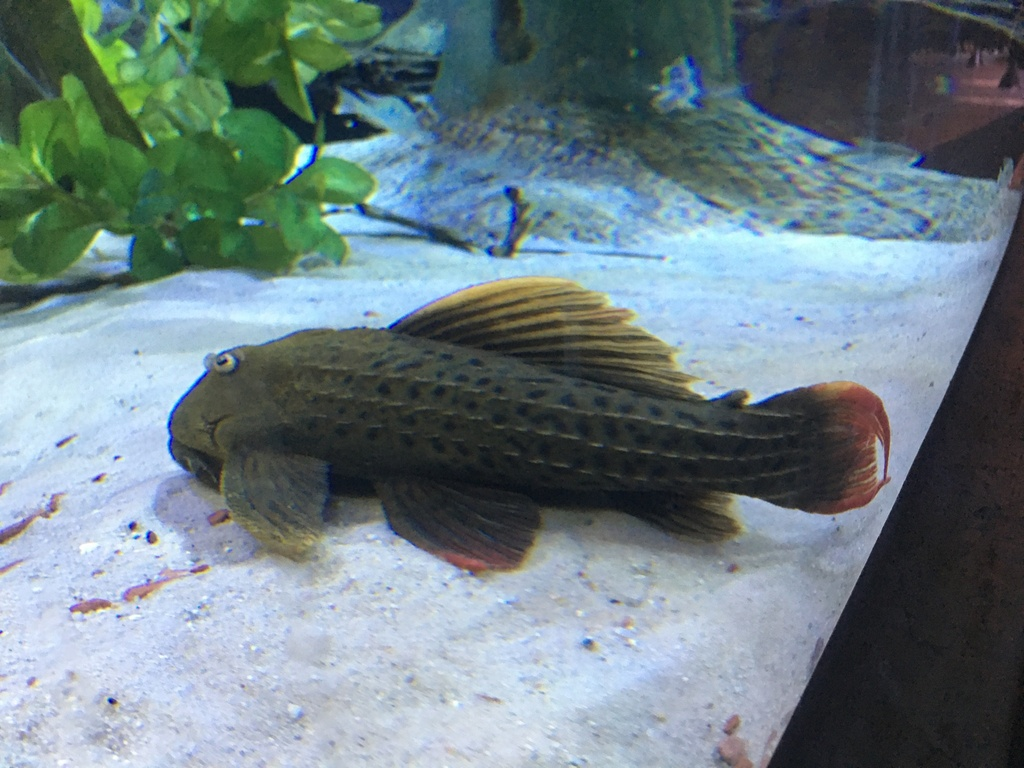

Scientific classification
- Kingdom: Animalia
- Phylum: Chordata
- Class: Actinopterygii
- Order: Siluriformes
- Family: Loricariidae
- Genus: Pseudacanthicus
- Species: P. pitanga

Binomial name
- Pseudacanthicus pitanga Chamon, 2015

= Pseudacanthicus pitanga =

Species of catfish

Pseudacanthicus pitanga is a species of freshwater ray-finned fish belonging to the family Loricariidae, the suckermouth armored catfishes, and the subfamily Hypostominae, the suckermouth catfishes. This catfish is found in South America, where it occurs in the Tocantins River basin in Brazil. The species reaches a standard length of 30 cm (12 in). It was described in 2015 by Carine C. Chamon of the Federal University of Tocantins on the basis of distinctive coloration and morphology. Its specific epithet, pitanga, is derived from a Tupi-Guarani word meaning "red", in reference to the color of the species' fins.

P. pitanga appears in the aquarium trade, where it is often referred to either as the red-fin cactus pleco or by its associated L-number, which is L-024. It is reportedly bred in captivity and exported to multiple countries for aquarium use, especially the United States and countries in Europe.
