= Endless Ocean: Blue World =

2009 video game

- North American cover art
- Developer: Arika
- Publisher: Nintendo
- Directors: Akira Kurabayashi; Masaki Tawara
- Producers: Ichirou Mihara; Hitoshi Yamagami
- Designers: Ichirou Mihara; Masaki Tawara
- Composers: Ayako Saso; Taihei Sato
- Platform: Wii
- Release: JP: September 17, 2009; EU: February 5, 2010; NA: February 22, 2010; AU: February 25, 2010
- Genres: Adventure, simulation
- Modes: Single-player, multiplayer

Endless Ocean: Blue World, released in PAL territories as Endless Ocean 2: Adventures of the Deep and Japan as Forever Blue: Call of the Ocean, (Note: Japanese: FOREVER BLUE( 2) 海の呼び声, Hepburn: Forever Blue( Tsū): Umi no Yobigoe) is a scuba diving video game developed by Arika and published by Nintendo for the Wii. The sequel to Endless Ocean, it was released in Japan in September 2009 and in February 2010 elsewhere. The game was released as part of the Touch! Generations series of games in Europe.

A follow-up, Endless Ocean Luminous, was released on May 2, 2024, for the Nintendo Switch.

== Gameplay ==
The player encounters a hostile caiman.

Blue World expands upon Endless Ocean's gameplay, allowing players to travel to twelve different diving spots around the globe, including polar and freshwater locations.

The ability to dive with a dolphin as a companion returns from the first game, with the player now being able to ride them to traverse through the water. They can also sell salvaged treasure and artifacts, for money that can be used to purchase items, including new diving suits, items to decorate their island and private reef. Upgrades can also be purchased, which allow diving for a longer time and reduce the risk of taking damage from dangers such as hostile creatures or running out of oxygen. The aquarium also returns, with the player now being able to walk outside the tanks. Several new areas are introduced, such as the Marine Life Annex, which houses shore species such as penguins, shorebirds and seals, and the Small World, which houses smaller fish and invertebrates. Potentially dangerous creatures such as sharks, crocodiles, and electric eels now display a warning and can attack the player. The player can drive them off using a tranquilizer-like tool called the Pulsar, which can shoot electric charges to calm them down and can also heal sick or injured creatures.

Blue World features various animals, including dolphins, whales, sea lions, penguins, manatees, sharks, sea turtles, with around 400 different species of fish, mammals, birds, invertebrates, reptiles and amphibians. There are also 30 legendary creatures that can be found in various regions of the game: a select few play a role in the game's storyline and can be interacted with at any time afterwards, but most require a special condition to be met before they can be found.

Blue World features online cooperative multiplayer that allows players to communicate using the Wii Speak peripheral, which the game was bundled with for a short time. As with the first game, players can take pictures during their dives, which can now be saved to an SD card.

== Plot ==
The game revolves around a Pacific legend known as the Song of Dragons. The player character, a university student studying folklore, is intrigued by the legend and takes leave from their studies to visit the Paoul Republic in the South Pacific. There, they apply for a job at R&R Diving Service, which is run by Jean-Eric Louvier and his granddaughter Oceana. During the player's entrance examination dive, Oceana drops a lapis lazuli pendant her late father Matthias gave her, which emits a strange sound and causes a nearby humpback whale to become aggressive. Curious, she disregards Jean-Eric's warnings and attempts to retrieve a second pendant she lost as a child, only to be threatened by an aggressive tiger shark. The player is able to drive off the shark and retrieve the pendant. After deciding to have the pendants appraised, R&R contacts Nancy Young, a local trader who suggests that they search for Valka Castle, which sank beneath the waves in the 17th century, to find further clues.

After traveling to the Aegean Sea, the group meets Gaston 'GG' Gray, an American salvager who challenges them to find Valka Castle. The player and Oceana discover the castle while trying to escape the man-eating great white shark Thanatos, where they uncover an ancient lapis lazuli tablet and hear a strange sound before being sealed in by a trap left by the castle's ruler. After escaping and reuniting with GG, he reveals that the tablet is from the Okeanides, an ancient seafaring civilization. R&R returns home and Nancy recommends that the group consult professor Hayoko Sakurai to have the tablet translated. After traveling to Hayoko's current workplace, an aquarium in Japan, she agrees to decipher the tablet in return for R&R completing her research on polar bears. After traveling to the northern coast of Canada and completing her research, Hayaoko joins R&R Diving Service and reveals that the tablet states that the Song of Dragons is the key to the Pacifica Treasure, a legendary treasure of the Okeanides. Following reports of the song being heard in the Antarctic, the group travels there to investigate further, during which the player hears the sound again and realizes it is the Song of Dragons. They help rescue a spectacled porpoise, which later helps R&R navigate out of a snowstorm. Upon returning home, Jean-Eric forbids further investigation into the legend, believing that it will only bring bad luck. He privately confesses to the player that Matthias had attempted to discover the Pacifica Treasure, which led to them falling out after he dismissed it as a myth; Matthias later disappeared during his investigation after his submarine broke down.

The next morning, GG visits R&R and explains that he has been searching for the Pacifica Treasure for the past 10 years, and offers to help them find it. Following a lead in South America, the player and GG head up the Amazon River, where they discover an ancient ruin behind a waterfall and uncover a second lapis lazuli tablet. After giving the tablet to Hayoko, she deciphers that the Okeanides could communicate with and control dragons using the Dragon Flute, which was broken into three pieces that were thrown into the sea to protect the royal treasure the dragons guarded. Oceana realizes the two pendants her father left her are pieces of the Dragon Flute, and Jean-Eric reveals that the final piece is within Matthias's submarine. After returning home, Jean-Eric resolves to help Oceana find the Pacifica Treasure to come to terms with his past, and R&R travel to the Red Sea to retrieve the final piece. Diving to the depths of the region, the player retrieves the final piece from the submarine's wreckage, along with a farewell message from Matthias to Jean-Eric.

Upon returning home, the party realizes that the grooves in the Dragon Flute, when projected onto Anaximander's Map of the Circular Earth, a copy of which exists in Valka Castle, indicate a location in the Red Sea. Upon arriving there, the player identifies a large chasm beneath a long fissure, but it is blocked off by a rock wall at the end, which R&R realizes is referred to in one of the tablets after identifying metal in it. They destroy the wall with dynamite, but must wait until the next day to investigate further to allow the debris to settle. The next morning, at the player's suggestion, R&R wakes at dawn as many whales and dolphins gather in the area and enters a large underground cavern, where a huge temple is submerged. While exploring the temple, the group finds a series of altars, one of which has a metal symbol which has been blocking the radio signal. GG turns it, opening a passage through an underground chamber into another altar. While he searches for a mechanism, three goblin sharks attack the group, but they are driven away. GG finds the mechanism and opens the chamber, which is covered in hieroglyphs that Hayako interprets as a mythologized history of the people who built the temple.

When the Dragon Flute is played, the goblin sharks return and seal the chamber as Hayako notes three statues around the room are the three forms of Ra. The player successfully calms the sharks and places the three parts of the flute in the statues, reopening the chamber and driving the sharks away. Suddenly, an unknown species of whale enters, which resembles a juvenile albino humpback whale. It and the others of its species in the temple begin singing the Song of Dragons, which Oceana deduces to be a product of echolocation. The group turns a large wheel in the center of the room, which causes all the whales in the area, inside and outside the temple, to bang their heads on the building, opening the treasure chamber. Before the party can retrieve it, however, they realize that the temple will soon collapse and they must escape. After discovering a symmetrical hall on the other side of the chamber, the group attempts to escape, and, after receiving a message on the radio telling Oceana to use a mechanism in a crack next to an image of Set, succeed. Afterwards, the group discuss their plans to reopen the temple, salvage its treasure, and learn the true secrets of its builders.

== Reception ==
Reception

Aggregate score
Aggregator	Score
Metacritic	76/100

Review scores
Publication	Score
1Up.com	A
Destructoid	8/10
Edge	7/10
Eurogamer	7/10
Famitsu	36/40
Game Informer	7.5/10
GameRevolution	C
GameSpot	8/10
IGN	(UK) 8/10 (US) 7/10
Nintendo Power	7.5/10
The A.V. Club	B−
The Daily Telegraph	8/10

The game received "generally favorable reviews" according to the review aggregation website Metacritic.

Famitsu gave the game a score 36 out of 40, one point higher than Endless Ocean, with all four reviewers giving the game nine points each. Eurogamer called the game a "genuinely peaceful and relaxing experience", though comparing it to "a cool adventure holiday for all ages." Official Nintendo Magazine was slightly more critical of the game, calling the game "batty ... but hardly enthralling" but also "truly fun, but not entirely action-packed". They also gave good reports of thrill and graphics involved in the game, which resulted in the game getting a slightly higher score than its predecessor.
