= Everblue =

2001 video game

- Japanese version cover art
- Developer: Arika
- Publisher: Capcom
- Director: Akira Nishitani
- Designer: Hiroshi Okuda
- Programmer: Akira Kurabayashi
- Artist: Motokazu Sakai
- Composer: Yousuke Yasui
- Platform: PlayStation 2
- Release: JP: August 9, 2001; EU: April 26, 2002
- Genre: Action-adventure
- Mode: Single-player

Everblue (EVERBLUE(エバーブルー), Ebāburū) is an adventure game based on scuba diving. It is the first of the Everblue series and was followed by Everblue 2 in 2002. It was released in Japan in 2001 and in Europe in 2002. It was developed by Arika.

== Plot ==
The player plays as Leo, a novice scuba diver, searching for treasure and learning about marine animal life.

== Gameplay ==
It is a first person game set underwater. The player takes the role of a scuba diver salvaging items from sunken ships and photographing underwater wildlife while either avoiding or confronting predators like sharks. The game also features an inventory system for collected objects, healing items, weapons, and tools, as well as an above water town with shops and NPCs.

== Reviews ==
Reception

Aggregate score
Aggregator	Score
GameRankings	42%

Review scores
Publication	Score
Computer and Video Games	3/10
Famitsu	31/40
GamesMaster	28%
PlayStation Official Magazine – UK	3/10
Play	45%
PSM3	51%

Everblue received "unfavorable" reviews according to the review aggregation website GameRankings. In Japan, Famitsu gave it a score of 31 out of 40.
