= Abigail (Final Fight) =

Playable Street Fighter character

- Final Fight and Street Fighter character
- Abigail in Street Fighter V
- First game: Final Fight (1989)
- Created by: Akira "Akiman" Yasuda
- Designed by: Akira "Akiman" Yasuda; Naoto "Bengus" Kuroshima (SFV)
- Voiced by: EN: Xander Mobus; JA: Ryōta Takeuchi

In-universe information
- Origin: Canada
- Nationality: Canadian

Abigail (Japanese: アビゲイル, Hepburn: Abigeiru) is a character introduced in Capcom's 1989 beat 'em up video game Final Fight, acting as an enforcer for the game's Mad Gear gang antagonists. Established as a character quick to fits of violent outbursts, he was later reintroduced in the fighting game Street Fighter V in a 2017 update for the game, now established as having an obsession with cars and managing a car garage with former members of the gang. In Street Fighter V, he is voiced by Xander Mobus in English and Ryōta Takeuchi in Japanese.

== Concept and development ==
Abigail was created for the 1989 beat 'em up Final Fight, designed by artist Akira "Akiman" Yasuda, and created as a member of the game's Mad Gear gang antagonists. Both he and the Andore characters were inspired by Yasuda's love of large wrestlers such as Stan Hansen and Andre the Giant, along with inspiration from Danish heavy metal musician King Diamond, with the appearance of the Andores based directly off the latter. Abigail meanwhile was designed as a headswap of the Andore design, acting as a boss in the game. In an interview, Yasuda stated he enjoyed such characters for the idea of being able to control them, but also being able to defeat them from a distance.

When the character was included in Street Fighter V, artist Naoto "Bengus" Kuroshima initially struggled with how to update his design. Several aspects of his character were defined along the way during this process, such as establishing that he was of Canadian nationality. Some concept art tried to explore facets of his personality such as suggesting he was shy and hid his face behind facepaint, a design wearing death masks as shoulder and kneepads to avenge fallen Mad Gear members inspired by the manga Ushio & Tora, and a version with a large pink boa and overtight shirt that would have established him as a close friend of fellow Final Fight character Poison. These designs were ultimately all scrapped, and they instead they stuck close to his original design but with the addition of a car fixation motif for his character.

=== Design ===
Standing 244 centimeters (8 ft) tall, Abigail is a man with large muscles and a mohawk cut short and stylized to resemble a maple leaf when viewed from above. Black makeup surrounds his eyes, extending downward in a point to his lips. His outfit consists of a white tank top with small skull symbols on it, white pants, and thick black boots. His pants feature tire marks to indicate that he was run over by a vehicle. He also wears rubber bits around his knuckles, a spiked black collar, and two smaller tired hanging from the back of his waist. An additional tire was added around each bicep with the text "MAD GEAR" painted on them, something the development team added to help emphasize his massive size.

When designing Abigail, they wanted to show a character that was big and strong, while also replicating the sense of fear he created in Final Fight. At the same time they wanted him to be a beloved character and incorporate more comedic aspects into him. Initially he was much larger, however this caused problems for the development team to balance his character and as a result they reduced his size. In addition to his regular outfit, Abigail was given several skins which included track suits, a costume stylized after the cyclops from Capcom's Ghosts 'n Goblins series, a "mech" robotic version that featured exhausts extending from his back, and a welder mask outfit that put tired around his wrists, ankles and torso.

== Appearances ==
Abigail is a large Canadian man introduced in the 1989 video game Final Fight, produced by Capcom. Living in the fictional Metro City in North America and prone to anger, he acts as a boss in the game to impede player's attempts to defeat the game's Mad Gear gang, and relies on throws and grappling moves. He later appeared in a 2017 update for Street Fighter V, now established as a car enthusiast and running a garage in Metro City with former members of Mad Gear. In this game's story mode he goes on a rampage searching for his missing truck, forming a friendship with the character Alex who recognizes the make of the vehicle from the sounds Abigail makes. It is later discovered his employees borrowed the truck per his instructions. In this appearance, he is voiced by Xander Mobus in English, and Ryōta Takeuchi in Japanese.

In other games, he also appeared in Mighty Final Fight, a super-deformed comedic remake of Final Fight, filling a similar role. Abigail has also been featured in mobile game Teppen, as part of an event revolving around Capcom series Ace Attorney. Abigail was intended at one point to have a cameo in Street Fighter III: 3rd Strike, where the shapeshifting character Twelve would have taken on his appearance if it attempted to mimic Hugo, a member of the Andore family in the game.

When designing his gameplay for Street Fighter V, the development team referenced Capcom's previous work for the Juggernaut, a massive Marvel Comics character they had included in their Marvel vs. Capcom series.

== Critical reception ==
Abigail was met with mostly positive reception, namely after his debut in Street Fighter V. Retronauts stated that while they felt nobody had been asking for the character's return and considered him forgettable in the original game, they were impressed by his design. Furthermore, they appreciated how many of his moves served as callbacks to his original character in Final Fight, and appreciated that some such as his grab were unchanged from that incarnation, allowing the character to retain what few elements were his own from his initial appearance. Meanwhile, Gavin Jasper stated that while he was not impressed by the addition of a car-focus with Abigail's character, he enjoyed what he called "the escalation of the big brute archetype" in Street Fighter, and expressed surprise it had taken so long for him to appear in a fighting game.

Wesley Yin-Poole of Eurogamer stated that his initial reaction to Abigail was horror, questioning how the character would move and play, describing him as "hideous as he was gargantuan", and further asking "Have you lost your mind, Capcom? What is this abomination?". However, as time went on, he found himself enjoying the character, describing him as having an over-the-top "make you smile personality". He added that while the character appeared competitively questionable, from a character design standpoint aspects such as his backdash shone. Yin-Poole further stated that while the character was not going to please everyone, Abigail demonstrated that the developers were willing to experiment, and that he helped demonstrate the effectiveness of Capcom's character design diversity.

Gareth Dutton of Vice observed that early reactions to Abigail from the fighting game community were mostly negative, with players expressing disdain for his oversized appearance and perceived simplistic gameplay. Dutton counted that he tended to have an affinity for such characters, enjoying the image of "a big brawler, clunking and donking his way around the screen, swatting puny opponents out of the air" and felt the community was taking things too serious and demanding too much conformity between characters. In response to complaints that Abigail's design was ugly, he pointed that other, more accepted characters were not without issue. He further described the character a mockery of the serious fighter archetype provided by series protagonist, calling Abigail "terrifying and silly at the same time" and expressed his love for the portrayal.

Others focused primarily on his design and potential. Nick Valdez of Destructoid pointed out that Abigail's design was not as bad as initially shown, as Capcom had seemingly used the larger version of his character from his by his V-Trigger. Instead while he acknowledged early reactions had been negative he found himself liking the character due to how "big, dumb, and goofy" he was, and felt his character was different enough from similar fighters to warrant inclusion in the game. Ozzie Mejia of Shack News made similar comparisons, though stated while those characters were more traditional grapplers, relying on grabbing and throwing the opponent, "Abigail [...] is a mack truck, eager to steamroll". He further examined how the character was taken by the different parts of the fighting game community, particularly from the competitive aspect where many professional players experimented with the character.

Virginia Glaze in an article for Red Bull's eSports website described Abigail as a unique character it was impossible to be neutral towards in the series. Elaborating, she stated "Abigail's entire mantra as a character is how over-the-top he is", emphasized by his large height and ability to reflect projectiles. She further observed that characters like him received a frustrated, negative response often from professional players on social media, even as crowds took a heavy liking to seeing him in action and even emulated his mannerisms as celebratory gestures during matches. She attributed this to how some saw large characters in fighting games as getting "unearned" victories, with players being seen as carried by the strengths of their characters instead of skill. This was corroborated by Rick Thiher, organizer of the tournament "Combo Breaker", who pointed out expectations of long, uninterrupted combo strings of attacks being the accepted metagame led to viewers feeling such powerful characters were "unfair". He further pointed out the weakness of such larger characters, particularly in being slower and larger targets, was something not readily apparent, adding that while they appeared strong on paper, "paper overviews rarely convey the patience, spacing, conditioning, and comfort level with risk/reward that make these characters challenging to play".
