= Mike Haggar =

Fictional character

- Final Fight and Slam Masters character
- Haggar as seen in Onimusha Soul
- First game: Final Fight (1989)
- Created by: Akira "Akiman" Yasuda
- Designed by: Akira Yasuda; Trent Kaniuga (Streetwise)
- Voiced by: English: Matt Riedy (Marvel vs. Capcom series); Josh Petersdorf (Street Fighter V); Japanese: Ryōtarō Okiayu (Final Fight CD, 2024-present); Tesshō Genda (Namco × Capcom); Kiyoyuki Yanada ((Ultimate) Marvel vs. Capcom 3, Street Fighter V, 2011-2020)

In-universe information
- Fighting style: Professional Wrestling
- Nationality: American

Mike Haggar (マイク・ハガー, Maiku Hagā), also known mononymously as Haggar, is a character in the Street Fighter shared universe, mainly playable in the Final Fight and Saturday Night Slam Masters series of video games. Haggar first appeared in the 1989 Capcom arcade game Final Fight and re-appeared in various other video game appearances. He was created by Akira "Akiman" Yasuda, introduced due to the need for a "big guy" in Final Fight. Inspiration was taken from various sources, such as Les Misérables, Mad Bull 34, and Streets of Fire. He was also included in the realistic Final Fight: Streetwise, where how his design should be handled was debated due to the realistic style. In the Final Fight series, he is a former wrestler turned mayor who does battle against the Mad Gear gang after they kidnap his daughter.

== Appearances ==
=== In video games ===
Introduced as one of the three playable characters in Final Fight, Haggar is a former professional wrestler turned mayor of Metro City, which is plagued by the Mad Gear gang, the most dominant street gang in the city. After he refuses their bribe, they kidnap his daughter Jessica in hopes of forcing Haggar into a reluctant cooperation with them. Haggar recruits the help of Jessica's boyfriend Cody and their mutual friend Guy to rescue her and defeat the gang. Haggar later appeared in the sequel games of Final Fight, in which he battles against a revived Mad Gear in Final Fight 2 in order to rescue Guy's girlfriend and sensei, and fighting against the Skull Cross gang in Final Fight 3. He also appears in related titles such as Final Fight Revenge, in which he fights against members of Mad Gear while searching for his missing daughter, and Mighty Final Fight, which happens to be a parody of the original Final Fight. Haggar also appears in Final Fight: Streetwise as a retired mayor in charge of a boat repair shop and training gym, offering assistance to Cody's brother Kyle. While not playable in the game's story mode, he can be recruited as a temporary computer-controlled ally and is playable in the game's arcade mode.

Beyond the Final Fight series, Haggar appears as a playable character in a prequel series, Saturday Night Slam Masters and its two sequels, Muscle Bomber Duo and Ring of Destruction: Slam Masters 2. He was also intended to appear in the canceled 3D fighting game Capcom Fighting All-Stars as a selectable character, reprising his role as mayor to save Metro City from a bomb attack. He also appears as one of several playable characters in the crossover game Namco × Capcom, and as a character card in each of the SNK vs. Capcom: Card Fighters titles. Haggar appears as the only playable Final Fight character in the crossover fighting games Marvel vs. Capcom 3: Fate of Two Worlds, Ultimate Marvel vs. Capcom 3, and Marvel vs. Capcom: Infinite.

Haggar has also made several cameo appearances such as in Alex's ending sequence for Capcom Fighting Evolution; in the backgrounds of Guy's Final Fight-inspired stages in Street Fighter Alpha 2, Street Fighter Alpha 3, and Super Street Fighter IV; Chun-Li's background in Super Puzzle Fighter II Turbo; as a costume for Frank West in Dead Rising 3 via downloadable content; and with Zangief wearing his clothing as an alternate outfit in Street Fighter IV. Haggar made a brief appearance in one of the 2011 trailers for Street Fighter X Tekken where he gets beaten by King, and also appears within the game's "Mad Gear Hideout" stage, where he arrives during the final round of a match and attacks several Mad Gear members decked out in kabuki attire before chasing fellow Final Fight character Sodom; this same stage reappears in Ultra Street Fighter IV, with Haggar once again making an appearance. In Street Fighter V, Haggar has passed down the mayor's position to Cody. Before the game came out, the official Street Fighter Twitter page showed the letter Haggar wrote to Cody, who was about to take over from him. Cody also has his clothing as an alternate outfit. In Lucia's story, the now-civilian Haggar goes to Lucia to inform her of rumors about a Mad Gear plot to eliminate Cody, asking her to investigate. Haggar is one of the few prominent characters in the Final Fight series who has never been a playable character in the Street Fighter series.

=== In other media ===
Haggar appears in the American Street Fighter cartoon episode "Final Fight". While the plot followed that of the same arcade game, Haggar was unable to act against the Mad Gear gang due to them holding Jessica hostage, and instead recruited the help of Ryu and Ken to rescue her, along with Cody and Guy. He reappears at the conclusion of the episode to be reunited with his daughter, shortly before Mad Gear's defeat. Haggar makes occasional appearances in the Street Fighter comic series. Haggar's backstory has been changed a little bit here. Before he became a politician, he is shown as both a professional wrestler and an action movie star. Haggar also appears as a mayor in the online flash cartoons Weebl and Bob's Team Laser Explosion, and as the protagonist in the stop-motion animation "A Sentinel in Metro City." Haggar also appears in the Final Fight fan film "The Broken Gear", portrayed by former professional wrestler and MMA fighter Don Frye.

== Conception and design ==
Created by Akira "Akiman" Yasuda, Haggar's creation was based around the need of a "big dude" for players to be able to select in Final Fight. Series producer Akira Nishitani recalled Yasida was a big fan of Les Misérables during the first game's development, with Yasuda noting that Haggar was influenced by the musical's protagonist Jean Valjean, who becomes a mayor in the latter half of the story and is portrayed as a devoted father. The manga series Mad Bull 34 was also an influence on his design, while the 1984 musical Streets of Fire was an influence on his character and the game's main story. Akiman noted he openly plagiarized ideas from many sources for ideas, taking the then-Capcom Chairman's words of "Get your inspiration from movies" as a go ahead to while working on the game. He also noted that Haggar's role as a former professional wrestler turned Mayor made the character interesting, but that the character felt boring when brought into wrestling game Saturday Night Slam Masters by comparison.

Haggar is depicted in the original Final Fight wearing olive-colored trousers with brown shoes and a broad Sam Browne belt strapped over his right shoulder, which is the usual depiction of the character. Some games deviate slightly from this design. For example, in the Slam Masters series, he wears green tights with a red trim and brown wrestling boots. By the events of Final Fight 3, he is given a ponytail hairstyle and wears green bicycle shorts as part of his outfit. When developing Final Fight: Streetwise, character designer Trent Kaniuga wanted to create a more realistic look for Haggar that would fit the game's aesthetic that was inspired by titles such as Grand Theft Auto, as well as the time gap between the game and Final Fight 3. Though the team was torn on keeping true to the previous game's designs, Kaniuga felt the game's time period represented one that had shifted away from heavy wrestling influence such as Wrestlemania, and considered the redesign a difficult challenge.

== Critical reception ==
Noted as the star of the Final Fight series, Haggar has been described as one of the most iconic and recognizable characters in gaming history. Haggar was named the best character of 1990 by the magazine Gamest, and one of the best of 1993 in the same magazine. GamesRadar+'s staff praised his character as one of the greatest protagonists in gaming, stating that to them, his "selflessness, strength, and the ability to inspire others" made him a "true hero." They also regarded him as one of the best Capcom characters. Destructoid's Zoey Handley stated the character's presence is what set Final Fight apart from other beat-em-ups such as Streets of Rage.

In the second edition of the book Greatest Gaming Icons by Retro Gamer they noted much of the fan love from the character came from Capcom's "obvious empathy for him", citing his role as the only returning character in the first three Final Fight games and his appearance in Saturday Night Slam Masters. They also stated that his role as a father, ex-wrestler, and honest, hard-working mayor made him have humanity and memorability. They felt that Final Fight without Haggar would lose something integral to the franchise, feeling that Haggar contrasted Guy and Cody, who he considered more typical beat 'em up protagonists. They also discussed his appearance, namely how his mustache was a part of his iconic look, feeling that their decision to make him look younger in Final Fight 3 was an unpopular choice.

In 2021, author Carlos Cesar Domingos do Amaral gave a dissertation on the character as part of a seminar for the Universidade Metodista de São Paulo in Brazil. In the presentation, titled Mike Haggar – Um Ícone da Luta Livre nos Games, he felt that the character represented a snapshot of wrestling and its themes in the 1990's, namely through his muscular physique and moves but also the emphasis of simplistic good vs. evil in his storyline. Do Amaral further felt Haggar paid homage to the Brazilian martial art Luta Livre, and suggested wrestling could still be represented in fictional mediums through characters like Haggar, simply strong men utilizing wrestling techniques to defeat villains, with a lasting impact.

== Bibliography ==
- ALL ABOUT カプコン対戦格闘ゲーム 1987-2000 (All About Capcom Head-To-Head Fighting Game 1987-2000), ISBN 4-88554-676-1
