= FF3 =

FF3 may refer to:

- Mozilla Firefox 3
- Fatal Frame III, a 2005 survival horror game for the PlayStation 2
- Fatal Fury 3, a 1995 competitive fighting game for the Neo-Geo
- Final Fantasy III, a 1990 console role-playing game for the Family Computer
- Final Fantasy VI, retitled Final Fantasy III in North America, a 1994 console role-playing game for the Super NES
- Final Fight 3, a 1995 side-scrolling action game for the Super NES
- The Fast and the Furious: Tokyo Drift, a 2006 film.
- Freedom Flotilla III, a maritime activism project regarding the blockade of the Gaza Strip
- Fantastic Four, a 2015 film and the third film in the Fantastic Four franchise.
- FF3 and FF3-1, format-preserving encryption ciphers.
