= Final Fight: Streetwise =

2006 video game

- North American cover art
- Developers: Capcom Production Studio 8 (PS2); Secret Level (Xbox)
- Publisher: Capcom
- Director: Yoshiaki Hatano
- Producer: Tom Sekine
- Designers: Dave Ralston; Joe Spataro; Michael Alexander; Cecil Carthen Jr. Eric Luther
- Programmers: Tetsuya Sakashita; Narayanan Vaidyanathan; Keith Weatherly; Joey Chang
- Artist: John Hayes
- Writers: Dave Ralston; Gerardo Enzo Sprigg; Trent Kaniuga
- Composer: Brad Fotsch
- Series: Final Fight
- Platforms: PlayStation 2, Xbox
- Release: NA: February 28, 2006; AU: April 5, 2006; EU: April 7, 2006
- Genres: Beat 'em up, action-adventure
- Modes: Single-player, multiplayer

Final Fight: Streetwise is a 2006 beat 'em up video game released by Capcom for the PlayStation 2 and Xbox. It was developed by the American team of Capcom Production Studio 8 (the developers of Final Fight Revenge and the Maximo series). It is the sixth and final game of the Final Fight series, as well as the only Final Fight game to not be released in Japan.

The game returned the series to its beat 'em up roots, casting players as Kyle Travers, brother of Cody from the first game. Series regulars Haggar and Guy also make appearances in the game's story mode, which has Kyle battling a maniacal priest named Father Bella and the illegal drug "glow".

== Gameplay ==
Final Fight: Streetwise is a 3D beat 'em up game. The story mode, which is exclusively single player, has ten minigames, including cockroach stomping, arm-wrestling, slide puzzles, shooting contests and the classic car bash. Players earn money through pit fights and side missions, upgrading Kyle's moveset by training in various gyms in Metro City while progressing through the game. An "instinct" system allows the player to counter opponents' attacks and make their own attacks more powerful.

The arcade mode is a no-frills 3D brawler for one or two players. It does not have upgradable movesets, counters or instinct abilities. Kyle, Cody, Guy and Haggar are all playable characters in arcade mode. However, the game is over when the life bar is empty.

The game's save system can only be used once the player decides to quit the game. Progress will resume at the last checkpoint rather than the character's last position.

== Plot ==
Streetwise is set several years after Final Fight, and focuses on Kyle Travers (voiced by Trent Kaniuga), Cody's younger brother. In Streetwise, Kyle roams the streets of his hometown, doing detective work, on the search for his captured brother. Kyle will run into familiar faces, as well as new ones.

=== Story ===
Kyle and Cody Travers are brothers who take part in the sport of underground fighting. As Cody Travers' younger brother, Kyle is the star of the underground Metro City fight club, spending nights fighting various other fighters in order to earn enough quick cash to make ends meet. After the end of a fight one evening, Kyle and Cody decide to meet at the local bar to celebrate with some beers and a round of pool; however, Cody has some unspoken business that delays his arrival for an hour. After Kyle arrives at the bar, he plays a game with his girlfriend and bar owner Vanessa Sims (whose brother is a member of the police department), while waiting for Cody. Kyle later finds out that Cody is using a powerful strength-enhancing drug called "glow", which helps the arthritis in his knees. Kyle later discovers that glow is being made by a psychotic priest named Father Bella, who hopes to use the drug to bring about the apocalypse. Kyle finds and confronts Bella on the roof of the church, along with a mutated Cody, as result of a concentrated dose of glow. After discovering Cody’s mutated state, Bella reveals his true motives behind his goal, revealing that Cody was responsible for the death of his elder brother some years ago, along with his true name, "Belger", the main antagonist of the original game, revealing he is the former’s younger brother, before all three engage in a two on one Final Fight.

During the battle, Cody miraculously regains his senses, and throws himself and Belger off the roof landing in the courtyard, as Belger begins to regain consciousness from the fall, he reaches for a dropped handgun nearby but is stopped by Kyle. Uttering his last words "I am your savior," before Kyle fires a fatal shot directly to his head, replying "You're nothing." He finds Cody, still mutated but unconscious from the fall.

Some time later, Kyle and Cody awaken in a hospital, where they meet with Vanessa whose brother was killed during the murderous rampage; holding onto her late brother's badge in his memory. Cody then ominously reveals that his arthritis is now gone and is eager to resume fighting, implying the glow has relieved him of the condition, however, Kyle is distracted from Cody’s statement from a news broadcast of the creator of "glow", Dr. Chang, leaving the police station, implying that their situation may not be over yet.

=== Characters ===
The game's protagonist is Kyle Travers, younger brother of Cody Travers from the original Final Fight. He is a 27-year-old former Marine who has lived on the streets of Metro City, along with Cody, since childhood. Coming from a broken family, Kyle was brought up by his brother, who taught him how to survive life on the streets and earn respect. Haggar reveals that Kyle was a troublemaker and hoodlum prior to joining the military, calling him a "skinny legged punk". Later, as a skilled hand-to-hand fighter, Kyle uses his talent to support himself in the local pit fighting club. He goes in search of Cody after he is abducted from Kyle's girlfriend's bar. His girlfriend, Vanessa Sims, and her brother, Sergeant Sims, aid Kyle in his search by providing him with information as they get it.

Enemies include 2P, Andore (voiced by Gerardo Sprigg) and Cammy. The game's antagonist is Father Bella. He has been distributing a new drug called GLOW throughout Metro City. It is later revealed that he is the younger brother of Belger, the antagonist of the original Final Fight.

== Development ==
Before Streetwise entered development, Capcom Studio 8 worked on a separate game for the PlayStation 2, titled Final Fight: Seven Sons, which had different characters, a different gameplay system, a simulated "railcam" and cel-shaded graphics, the latter two of which served to mimic the aesthetics of Final Fight and its SNES sequels.

A promotional comic that contained concept art, illustrated by artist and lead voice actor Trent Kaniuga, was included with preorders of the game.

As seen in the promotional comic, Sodom and Poison, both of whom were from the original Final Fight as well as Final Fight Revenge, were initially planned to be in Streetwise. It is unknown what their intended roles in the game were, or why they were cut from the final version. Additionally, Mike Haggar and Guy were supposed to have more screen-time, but several cutscenes featuring them were eventually removed.

=== Soundtrack ===
As well as remixes of the original game's themes, the soundtrack is a mix of hip hop and mainstream/popular metal and includes artists such as RZA, Mos Def, Fear Factory, Slipknot, Soulfly, Dub Pistols, Shadows Fall, Opeth, Lil' Flip, Nappy Roots, Dujeous, and Gizmachi.

== Reception ==
Reception

Aggregate score
Aggregator	Score	
Aggregator	PS2	Xbox
Metacritic	43/100	42/100

Review scores
Publication	Score	
Publication	PS2	Xbox
Electronic Gaming Monthly	6.83/10	6.83/10
Eurogamer	N/A	3/10
Game Informer	4/10	4/10
GamePro	3.5/5	N/A
GameRevolution	D−	D−
GameSpot	3.3/10	3.3/10
GameSpy	1.5/5	1.5/5
GameZone	5/10	5.6/10
IGN	3.6/10	3.5/10
Official U.S. PlayStation Magazine	3/5	N/A
Official Xbox Magazine (US)	N/A	3.5/10
The A.V. Club	D+	D+
Detroit Free Press	N/A	1/4

Final Fight: Streetwise was widely panned by critics on both platforms according to the review aggregator website Metacritic. Many video game review websites and magazines, including IGN, GameSpot and Game Informer, made several complaints about flaws in the game, usually ending with an unfavorable review. Many reviewers claimed that, while the game offers a simple and functional gameplay in the same vein of the original arcade game, it is easily overshadowed by the flaws in other departments.

ScrewAttack named the game as 6th on their list of "Top 10 Worst 2D to 3D Games" and also placed the game as 5th on their "Top 10 Worst Reboots or Remakes" list.
