= Final Fight Revenge =

1999 video game

- Japanese arcade flyer
- Developers: Capcom Digital Studios
- Publisher: Capcom
- Directors: Yoshiki Okamoto; David Siller
- Producers: Tetsuya Iijima; Jim Wallace; Mark Rogers
- Designer: Tetsuya Iijima
- Artist: Raymond Fung
- Composer: Jim Wallace
- Series: Final Fight
- Platforms: Arcade, Sega Saturn
- Release: Arcade; July 1999; Saturn: JP: March 30, 2000
- Genre: Fighting
- Modes: Single-player, multiplayer
- Arcade system: Sega Titan Video (ST-V)

Final Fight Revenge is a 1999 3D fighting game released by Capcom, and the only one-on-one fighting game in the Final Fight series of beat 'em up games. Originally developed and released for the ST-V arcade hardware, a home version was released for the Sega Saturn in 2000 in Japan only. The cast of playable characters in Final Fight Revenge includes series mainstays Mike Haggar, Cody and Guy, along with various members of the opposing Mad Gear gang.

== Gameplay ==
Gameplay screenshot

Final Fight Revenge features a control configuration of an eight directional joystick and five action buttons: four attack buttons (two punch buttons and two kick buttons) and a fifth "special" button. The special button serves two functions in the game; the first function allows players to side-step into the foreground or background by holding special and pressing up or down.

The special button is also used to pick up weapons or health-recovering items lying on the ground. When the player is near a retrievable item or weapon, a green arrow will appear over the item to alert the player of its presence. There are two types of weapons in this game: melee weapons such as knives and lead pipes; or firearms such as flamethrowers and machine guns. The player can pick and store up to three weapons in their inventory at once and switch between them. The player can also throw a currently equipped weapon to their opponent.

As with most Capcom fighting games, each character has their own set of grappling moves and command-based Special Moves, as Super Moves that can only be performed by filling the Super Move gauge. The player can stock up to three full Super Move gauges. When a player finishes off an opponent with certain Super Moves a special finishing sequence will be shown to the player.

=== Characters ===
Final Fight Revenge features ten playable fighters, all of whom made their debut in the original Final Fight game. The playable roster includes Cody, Guy and Haggar, who were the player characters; El Gado, Poison and Andore, who were enemy characters; and Damnd, Sodom, Edi E., and Rolento, who were boss characters. A zombiefied version of Belger, the final boss from the original Final Fight, appears as the non-playable final boss character. The single-player mode consists of matches against six computer-controlled opponents and a final match against Belger. Each character has their own specific ending.

Guy, Sodom, Rolento, and Cody were previously featured in Capcom's Street Fighter Alpha series, with some of their abilities from Alpha carrying over to Revenge. Hugo and Poison would go on to appear with similar special moves in later Street Fighter games, while Haggar would later appear in the Marvel vs. Capcom series.

== Development and release ==
The game was designed by the Japanese division of Capcom but programmed by the American development division Capcom Digital Studios (later known as "Capcom Production Studio 8" in 2003), which later produced Maximo: Ghosts to Glory and Final Fight: Streetwise.

Final Fight Revenge was released for the arcades in July 1999 and ran on the Sega ST-V arcade hardware. It was the first Final Fight game released for the arcades since the original Final Fight. A home version was released for the Sega Saturn on March 30, 2000, making it the last Capcom game officially released for the platform. The Saturn release required a 4 MB expansion RAM cartridge. Capcom offered the game in two editions: a standalone software release priced at ¥5,800 and a ¥7,800 package bundled with the cartridge. The Sega Saturn version was only available in Japan. However, the game can be played in English if the console's internal language is set to any language except Japanese. A Dreamcast version was planned, but it was cancelled.

The Sega Saturn version has become rather rare, and a 2014 guide listed the game as costing £100 - £200 in the United Kingdom.

== Reception ==
GameFan gave the game a 40 out of 100. Famitsu gave it a 20 out of 40 score.

German magazine Video Games gave it a score of 50 out of 100.

Three reviewers for the Dreamcast Magazine (Japan) gave the game scores of 6, 6, and 8, for a total of 6.6 out of 10.

Game designer Shinji Mikami said in a 2020 interview that he was disappointed with Final Fight: Revenge as he was a fan of the series. It inspired him to make his own beat 'em up game in 2006 called God Hand.
