= Retsu =

Retsu (烈) (also romanized Retu in the Kunrei-shiki system) is a Japanese word meaning "Violent" or "Furious".

Retsu is also the name of the following fictional characters:

- Retsu Unohana, a character from the manga and anime Bleach
- Retsu, a character from the game Street Fighter
- Retsu, a character from the Final Fight 2 and the game's main antagonist and final boss.
- Retsu Seiba, one of the main characters of Bakusō Kyōdai Let's & Go!!
- Retsu Ichijoji, main character from the 1982 Japanese tokusatsu television series, Space Sheriff Gavan.
- Retsu Fukami, main character from the 2007 Japanese tokusatsu television series, Juken Sentai Gekiranger.
- Retsu Kaioh, one of the main characters of Baki the Grappler
