= Poison (Final Fight) =

Fictional character

- Final Fight and Street Fighter character
- Poison from Final Fight
- First game: Final Fight (1989)
- Created by: Akira "Akiman" Yasuda
- Designed by: Akira "Akiman" Yasuda; Trent Kaniuga (Streetwise); Takayuki Nakayama (SFV)
- Voiced by: English: Karen Strassman; Japanese: Kaoru Fujino (Street Fighter III: 2nd Impact); Atsuko Tanaka (Street Fighter III: 3rd Strike, Street Fighter X Tekken, Ultra Street Fighter IV, Street Fighter V: Arcade Edition); Masae Yumi (SNK vs. Capcom: SVC Chaos)

In-universe information
- Origin: Los Angeles, California
- Nationality: American

Poison (Japanese: ポイズン) is a character in Capcom's Final Fight and Street Fighter series of video games. Created by Akira Yasuda for Capcom, Poison was originally conceived as a female thug in Final Fight alongside a similar character, Roxy, as part of the game's antagonist group Mad Gear, taking inspiration for her design from Jeanne Basone's appearance as "Hollywood" in professional wrestling magazine G.L.O.W. She later appeared in other Capcom-produced games, media and merchandise in particular those related to the Final Fight and Street Fighter franchises, with later appearances partnering her with fellow Final Fight character Hugo as his wrestling manager. Since her introduction several other designers have contributed to her designs and outfits, including Jun Ikawa, Trent Kaniuga, and Takayuki Nakayama. She is voiced by Atsuko Tanaka since the Street Fighter III series and Masae Yumi in SNK vs. Capcom: SVC Chaos.

Poison and Roxy were designed as fast, athletic characters for players to encounter. Due to concerns during Final Fight's development about reactions from North American audiences to fighting women, both Poison and Roxy were labeled as "newhalfs", a Japanese slang term for trans women. However, Nintendo of America did not consider this satisfactory and both Poison and Roxy were replaced by the male characters "Billy" and "Sid" and have been for every subsequent North American port of the title on Nintendo consoles and handhelds. Capcom and even some developers tied to the character would later give several conflicting statements, with Street Fighter IV producer Yoshinori Ono stating at one point she was definitively transgender, before later stating the company's stance was that her gender is open to viewer interpretation.

The character's sex appeal and status as an early example of a transgender game character has led to her being highly regarded, though often with acknowledgment of her ambiguous gender status. The early ambiguity regarding this subject has led to much discussion and debate amongst fans of the character.

== Conception and design ==
Poison's first appearance in Final Fight featured her and a palette swap character named Roxy as recurring minor enemies for the player to fight. Named after the band by an unnamed female employee at Capcom, she was designed by Akira Yasuda to contrast against the bigger characters in the game and move about randomly, and were originally intended to utilize backflips to flee. Described as a "cool and rebellious woman", Poison was conceived due to Yasuda's desire to introduce sexy female gang members to the game. To this end he referenced Western fashion magazines, specifically Jeanne Basone's appearance as "Hollywood" in professional wrestling magazine G.L.O.W.

Poison is shown to be a woman with long, rugged, pink hair. She wears a black cap, a choker, cutoff, blue jean-shorts, red high-heels, and a tanktop cut just below her breasts. In Final Fight Revenge and some artworks, her hair is shown to be purple instead. She wears several armbands around her right arm and has chains and a pair of handcuffs suspended off her shorts, and is often depicted holding a riding crop. Final Fight Revenge features her also possessing a whip used in attacks, an element of her design brought back later with Street Fighter X Tekken. Poison stands 175 centimetres (5 ft 9 in) tall and has bust/waist/hip measurements of 88-66-89 cm (35-25-35 in).

=== Gender ===
According to the book All About Capcom Head to Head Fighting Games and Final Fight director Akira Nishitani, the characters were originally planned to be cisgender women, but were changed to "newhalfs" (a Japanese slang term for trans women) after the game's release, due to the suggestion that "hitting women was considered rude" in America and the concern that feminist groups would sue. However, concept artwork included in the 2005 compilation Capcom Classics Collection of the pair specifically uses the kana for 'newhalf' (ニューハーフ). In 2007 Nishitani stated that he supposed the character "could be male", but added it was up to the viewer to decide. He later clarified in a discussion on Twitter that in his personal view Poison was a woman. Yasuda himself commented that as far as her gender, he considers her transgender in North American localizations, but cis in Japan.

A later appearance by Poison as a playable character in Final Fight Revenge, an American-produced 3D fighting game spinoff of Final Fight, portrayed the character in a highly feminine manner and had her romantically interested in Final Fight hero Cody. Commentary about her ending in the game in All About Capcom suggested that the character may have received sex reassignment surgery. The Final Fight-related character profiles featured in Capcom Classics Collection instead allude to her being a cross-dresser, while addressing Roxy as a "she" who dislikes Poison's cross-dressing.

Street Fighter IV's producer Yoshinori Ono, when asked in an interview about Poison's gender, stated: "Let's set the record straight: In North America, Poison is officially a post-op transsexual woman. But in Japan, she simply tucks her business away to look female." He later emphasized it again when asked about what female characters could be included in the game Street Fighter IV, stating that it would be too confusing to include her due to the region-specific gender. However, in a 2011 interview with Electronic Gaming Monthly at the Tokyo Game Show, he stated that Capcom "doesn't have a stance technically", and while they wouldn't give an official answer, felt it was up to the viewer to decide. He added that his intent was to please all fans and that the mystery behind her gender was the core of the character. During the same interview, a Capcom representative further added that they worked closely with GLAAD, an organization concerned with the portrayal of LGBT people in media, to ensure "anything that might be offensive has been very tailored to not be" for Poison's portrayal in Street Fighter X Tekken.

=== Alternate designs ===
Poison was given a secondary outfit for Capcom Fighting All-Stars alongside her primary classic attire. Made of shiny, silvery material it consisted of boots that extended halfway up her thighs and a combined sleeveless shirt/short skirt with a plunging neckline. Gloves and a small hairband were also added, as well as a belt, with the handcuffs hanging off of it. Her arm straps were removed, though the strap around her neck remained. This design was originally created by Street Fighter III character designer Jun Ikawa as a possible outfit for her appearance in the series. It was included as her secondary outfit Street Fighter IV, changed to green with a matching military cap and long gloves.

Though not appearing in Final Fight: Streetwise, the concept art section of the promotional comic for the game showcases an unused Poison redesign by Trent Kaniuga. The design features red hair, a red micro skirt showing a hint of underwear, a jacket, a button-up white shirt showing some of her abdomen, black high-heeled boots, a gold belt, and a wool cap. In August 2006, Kaniuga revealed three additional alternate designs on ConceptArt.org's internet forum; one being the classic look; another being a white button-up shirt with red pants, high heels, and short hair; and the third keeping the high heels and pants, but adding shades, returning her hair to full length and swapping the shirt for a jacket with deep cleavage. All four designs use the same color scheme, belt, and handcuffs. In a later video, Kaniuga stated he was concerned he had made her skirt too short, but laughingly noted "there wasn't too much resistance from the team on that though."

When designing her character model for Street Fighter x Tekken, production studio Dimps focused on her sexiness due to her long legs in her appearance and movement, while keeping her design close to the original, and a secondary outfit added modeled after the character "Unknown" from Tekken Tag Tournament to enhance her sex appeal. While the studio was quite pleased with the results, calling her the most glamorous character in the title, the effects designer for the game was "horribly embarrassed" whenever he had to check the character's visual effects frame by frame. For Street Fighter V, several redesigns were considered for the character, including a green flowing jacket with a exposed black bra held together by a ring, a red tailed jacket with zebra striped pants, and a black and pink dress with long gloves, stockings and a pink hat. Producer Takayuki Nakayama kept her final design close to the original but added multiple elements, giving her a full glove on her right arm, a stocking on her left leg, garters, and made her whip consistently visible. The whip in turn was intended to give her movements a more "flashy" and unique appearance, while her hair was shortened and frilled outward to better draw attention to the whip while also giving her a "clean, uncluttered look".

== Appearances ==
Introduced in the original Final Fight, Poison is an orphan from Los Angeles. She enjoys fighting and uses it as a means to stay in shape, making use of her ties with the original Mad Gear Gang to keep herself out of prison. In Final Fight Revenge, her behavior was represented as womanly and sultry, ranging from flirtatious comments to pole dancing. She frames Cody for her assault crimes and gets him arrested by Edi. E, though she later visits him in jail having developed romantic feelings for him. In the Street Fighter III series, she reappears working as a wrestling manager for her friend Hugo, who could not find a tag team partner due to his immense strength. From here their plots would focus on the two searching for a tag partner or starting their own wrestling association, echoed in their SNK vs. Capcom: SVC Chaos appearance. Poison later appeared as a playable character alongside Hugo in Street Fighter X Tekken with similar goals, and in Ultra Street Fighter IV, in which she combined the concept with a rock band theme in her character ending. In Street Fighter V, Poison returns to Metro City after Hugo and she have a falling-out, searching for a new partner she can make a star to little success. Ultimately, she and Hugo reconcile and become partners once again.

Poison was also planned to appear both in Capcom Fighting All-Stars and Final Fight Streetwise, though the first game was canceled and she was cut from the second. In Mighty Final Fight, a chibi parody of the character named "Poison Kiss" appears as a generic enemy, a corrupt cop and characterized as her younger sister. Poison has also appeared based on her role as Hugo's manager on cards in the SNK vs. Capcom: Card Fighters series, as well as the related physical trading card game Versus TCG. In other titles she makes stand-alone appearances, such as on cards for browser game Onimusha: Soul and GungHo Online Entertainment's mobile game TEPPEN, and as a selectable character in TOPJOY's roleplaying game Street Fighter: Duel, the latter of which also features an alternate version called "Street Poison" in a stylized police uniform.

When Final Fight was ported to the Super Nintendo Entertainment System, an American playtester working for Capcom reviewed the content during the localization process with one of the Japanese designers and objected to the protagonist hitting women. While Akira Yasuda pointed out that the characters had already been made into trans women, believing this to be an acceptable compromise, Poison and Roxy were replaced with regular male punks named "Billy" and "Sid" in the English localization despite his objections. This change has been repeated with every English port to Nintendo consoles, including the Game Boy Advance version Final Fight One and the Wii's Virtual Console. English versions of the Sega CD port censored the characters in a different manner, redrawing both of them with longer shirts and shorts and covering the under-cleavage shown when the characters were struck.

=== Gameplay ===
In the original Final Fight, Poison and Roxy both utilized standing and acrobatic flip-kicks to attack the player. As one of the fighters in Final Fight Revenge, her moveset was expanded heavily, and she was armed with a whip. The whip is used primarily in her Cat Claw and Thunder Whip attacks (which are comparable to Shoryuken/Shinryūken styled attacks, respectively), and can be used to steal a weapon from the opponent. Additionally, her handcuffs can be thrown as a horizontal projectile move to immobilize the opponent for a short time.

One particular Final Fight Revenge attack, Poison Kiss, has her blow a large heart-shaped kiss at the opponent that travels in a sine wave path. If it connects, a quick peep show of Poison in several erotic poses is displayed, and afterwards the opponent is shown stunned with hearts dancing over their head. Defeating an opponent with this attack results in Poison doing a pole dance for her win pose, with her whip serving as the pole. Though not playable in the beta test of Capcom Fighting All-Stars, promotional material released by Capcom for the title show that this move would have been retained for her gameplay. However, in Ultra Street Fighter IV, her Poison Kiss follows up with several slaps and a groin kick when it hits the opponent, similar to her Cross Art move from Street Fighter X Tekken.

As for the Street Fighter series, starting from Street Fighter X Tekken, Poison has a unique moveset of her own that mixes agile pro wrestling techniques and her own streetfighting abilities. Poison's standard throws include a multi-hitting slap and a Frankensteiner, Aeolus Edge and Kissed By a Goddess which are the names of her Fireball and Shoryuken-like moves, and Whip of Love which is a multi-hitting whip attack and is done in a similar fashion to Fei Long's Rekkas. Her famous flip kick from the original Final Fight games appears as a special called Love Me Tender. After the flipping axe-kick, Poison can follow this move up with a reverse Frankensteiner (Poison-Rana). In addition, Poison's Super Art is called Love Storm, and starts with her charging a large version of Aeolus Edge. Once it hits, she flips into the air and lands with a hard hitting axe kick that stuns the opponent in a prone position. Afterwards, she repeatedly smacks the opponent with her horsewhip and delivers a final blow that knocks them into the air. Poison also retained her signature backflip from the original game. For Street Fighter V, her gameplay was changed to emphasize a long-range moveset, with a key focus being to set her apart from similar characters in the game by incorporating her whip into combos and standing attacks.

=== In other media ===
In print media, Poison is also featured frequently in UDON Entertainment's Street Fighter comic series, where according to Director of Publishing Matt Moylan she is considered transgender. Introduced in the sixth issue of Street Fighter II Turbo, she appears at the qualifier for the world martial arts tournament, where the rules are changed and instead of just fighting each other they must locate one of several invites to the tournament before the building explodes. After finding an invite, she is stopped by Cody who insults her by saying she isn't "much of a lady", causing her to fly into rage. She defeats him by handcuffing him to an elevator going up, but is defeated herself by another entrant before she can claim the invite. In the second volume Super Street Fighter, a collection of short stories, she appears alongside Hugo preparing for a match against the wrestler Rainbow Mika. However, Hugo finds Mika "too pretty" and refuses to fight, causing Poison to take his place. Poison handcuffs Mika during the match, but is defeated when Mika instead somersaults butt-first into her midsection, knocking Poison unconscious. In Street Fighter Unlimited, both her and other members of Mad Gear are invited to Gill's fighting tournament, skeptical of his self-proclaimed god. After Gill reveals himself to be a villain, she fights alongside the other participants to take him down.

In manga, Poison appears in the first volume of the Street Fighter III: Ryu Final manga by Masahiko Nakahira, encountering protagonist Ryu in Germany while he's in need of money for food. Proposing a three minute match against Hugo in front of a crowd to earn money, Ryu agrees, and after Poison encourages Hugo the two men fight. Hugo and Ryu knock each other out by the end of the match, and after they recover Poison splits the earnings and the pair bids Ryu farewell. They later return in the second volume, with Poison overseeing Hugo's match against muay thai fighter Sagat. She also briefly appears in issue 74.5 of the manga series Kengan Ashura, as one of the fighters representing the "Capcom Association" present to watch Ryu fight the protagonist Ohma Tokita. The event is later suggested to be a dream that Ohma had.

== Promotion and reception ==
Despite starting as a minor enemy in Final Fight, Poison has been very popular since the game's release.

Poison has been featured in various promotional Street Fighter-related artworks, as early as Street Fighter II. Additionally she has been used as a cameo character three times in the Street Fighter Alpha series. In terms of merchandise, an immovable model was being made for the 2008 Capcom Girls Collection line of figurines by Mitsumasa Yoshizawa, using her Final Fight attire and at 1/6 height, standing nearly 11 inches tall. A similar model was released later on, identical to the previous figurine except with her giving a thumbs down gesture and darker colors. A version with blonde hair was later released as well. In Capcom's press kit for the 2010 release of Final Fight: Double Impact, a pink hair spray was included in tribute to the character, with the text describing it as "For men, women, and everything in between." Capcom later featured her as one of the characters for their Capcom Girls 2011 calendar.

In February 1991, Gamest magazine named her one of the top fifty characters in video games of 1990, placing her twenty-sixth on their list. Former Tips & Tricks executive editor Wataru Maruyama cited her design as an example of how an outfit is worn compared to its complexity can make a character memorable and stand out, stating "to use a phrase I don’t particularly like to use, she totally worked it." Prior to her appearance in Street Fighter x Tekken, GamesRadar+ named her one of twelve Street Fighter related characters they wished to see in the main series, arguing that her status should not be an issue against her inclusion and that the character deserved another stand-alone appearance of her own. Complex complained about her portrayal, stating since Final Fight she was reinvisioned as "just a slutty girl whose main fighting technique borderlines on pimp slapping your opponent and shaking your breasts". In contrast Joystiq named her their favorite character of the Final Fight series, stating that her "hypersexualized appearance and random flipping" made the character memorable, and that the controversy over her gender made the character even more so. Maddy Myers in an article for Paste stated she felt a kinship for Poison despite her controversies, enjoying the domme aspects of the character and adding that detractors focusing on a male gaze emphasis "would be clutching their pearls past the breaking point to see how Ultra Street Fighter 4 lovingly lingers on Poison's backside".

As the exact nature of Poison's status as gender-variant has been left deliberately ambiguous by Capcom, the topic has remained a popular subject for debate among fans and gaming media alike. Electronic Gaming Monthly's Eric L. Patterson described her as being a significant character to the trans community, and a perfect example of how it is "so awkward when it comes to knowing how to deal with characters who aren't white, male, and heterosexual" in video games. Gavin Jasper of Den of Geek described Capcom's intended workaround to get past Nintendo censors as "pretty fucked up", though added praise for how she was presented since, stating "Capcom actually did right by not making that a punchline. Poison continued to show up in stuff, and they let her have an identity that stepped away from all of that." GamesRadar in turn commented "Poison holds a distinction as one of gaming’s first trans characters, which began as a strange choice in localization but has become a part of the character that she wears with pride. If you take issue with it, that’s your problem, not hers. It's that kind of confidence that makes her so appealing." In an article examining every Street Fighter character Paste acknowledged the controversy, but instead focused on her character, stating "Capcom might not be able to ever set the record on her story, but the only one that needs telling is that Poison is a powerful and compelling character in every appearance she's made."
