= Final Fight 3 =

1995 video game

- North American box art
- Developer: Capcom
- Publisher: Capcom
- Producer: Tokuro Fujiwara
- Composer: Katsunari Kitajima
- Series: Final Fight
- Platform: Super Nintendo Entertainment System
- Release: JP: December 22, 1995; NA: January 1996; EU: March 13, 1996
- Genre: Beat 'em up
- Modes: Single-player, multiplayer

Final Fight 3, released in Japan as Final Fight Tough (Japanese: ファイナルファイト タフ, Hepburn: Fainaru Faito Tafu), is a 1995 beat 'em up video game developed and published by Capcom for the Super Nintendo Entertainment System. It is the second sequel to Final Fight released for the Super NES, following Final Fight 2. Like its predecessor, it was produced by Capcom's consumer division with no preceding arcade version released.

The game features the return of the protagonist Guy along with Haggar and also introduces new characters Lucia and Dean. The game's plot takes them through their efforts to rid Metro City of the new Skull Cross gang. Final Fight 3 introduced new moves, as well as branching paths during gameplay and multiple endings. Also available is the option to fight alongside a CPU-controlled partner. However, most critics felt these changes did too little in the way of expanding and improving upon the original Final Fight, and the game was released to little fanfare.

The next Final Fight game, Final Fight Revenge, eschewed the beat 'em up gameplay in favor of a 3D one-on-one fighting format.

== Plot ==
Following the annihilation of the Mad Gear Gang, a new criminal group named the Skull Cross Gang emerges as the new dominant criminal organization in Metro City. When Guy returns to Metro City from his martial arts training and reunites with his old friend Mike Haggar, the Mayor of Metro City, the two are suddenly alerted that the Skull Cross Gang has started a riot in the downtown area of the city. Joined by Lucia, a detective in the Metro City Police's Special Crimes Unit, and Dean, a street fighter whose family was murdered by the Skull Cross Gang, Guy and Haggar must once again save Metro City from its newest menace.

== Gameplay ==
Guy and Dean advance to fight Callman, the boss of stage 2. This is one of two locations the player can encounter Callman, due to the game's branching gameplay.

The player has a choice between four characters: Guy and Haggar from the original Final Fight return, along with new heroes Lucia and Dean. As in the previous Final Fight games, each character has their own set of moves, techniques and abilities unique to their character. Like in Final Fight 2, the game can be played alone or with a second player, along with an additional game mode that allows a single player be accompanied by a CPU-controlled partner.

The player has many new abilities which were not available in the previous Final Fight games. The player can now dash and perform dashing attacks or dashing jump attacks like in the previous Capcom beat-em-up Captain Commando. The player can also grab enemies from behind and perform holding and throwing attacks, as well as move while keeping the direction the player is facing locked.

The player also has access to command-based special techniques similar to Street Fighter, including a Super Move. Much like the Super Combos featured in Super Street Fighter II Turbo, the player has a Super Move gauge which fills up as the player performs their regular attacks against enemies. When the gauge is full, the player will have access to a powerful Super Move, which will consume the entire gauge. If the Super gauge remains full for a certain period and the Super move is not used, then the gauge will be emptied automatically.

Like in the previous Final Fight games, the player has access to weapons, health-restoring food and other bonus point items, which are stored inside breakable drums. Each character in Final Fight 3 specializes in a specific weapon and if the player picks up their character's preferred weapon, then they will have access to a unique combo attack exclusive to the character (for example, Guy specializes in using nunchaku).

There are a total of six stages in the game, each with their unique boss character. The stages in the game feature multiple paths that changes the areas the player will visit, as well as the enemies and bosses they encounter. The game's ending changes depending on the selected character, the path taken to reach the end of the game, and the difficulty setting.

== Reception ==
Reception

Review scores
Publication	Score
AllGame	3/5
Computer and Video Games	57/100
Electronic Gaming Monthly	6.5/10, 5.5/10, 5.5/10, 5/10
Game Informer	6.5/10
Game Players	68%
GameFan	55/100, 77/100, 67/100
GamesMaster	80%
Next Generation	2/5
Nintendo Life	8/10; 7/10
Official Nintendo Magazine	61/100
Retro Gamer	80%
Super Play	49%
Total!	(UK) 64/100 (DE) 2-
Nintendo Magazine System	74/100

Final Fight 3 received a 21.2/30 score in a readers' poll conducted by Super Famicom Magazine. The game also received average reviews from critics.

GamePro's The Axe Grinder approved the addition of Lucia, but felt that Dean's movement was slow and the bosses were little more than large, standard enemies. He praised the graphics and branching stages, but felt the repetitive gameplay outweighed these. Next Generation similarly felt that the new features were not enough to make the game a significant step up from the original Final Fight, stating that "It's not dull, but it's not all that exciting either". Electronic Gaming Monthly's four editors felt too that despite the improved graphics and new features, the game felt like simply "more of the same" with overly repetitive gameplay.

In 2018, Complex included the game on their best Super Nintendo games of all time list, writing that "The third and final game in the Final Fight trilogy is the best out of the litter". In 2023, Time Extension included the game on their best beat 'em ups of all time list, calling it the best in the Final Fight series.

== Legacy ==
The first stage's background music, "For Metro City", is used for the Hyper Street Fighter Alpha secret game featured in Street Fighter Alpha Anthology as Guy's theme music in Classic Mode. Lucia later appeared as a playable character in Street Fighter V.
