= Saturday Night Slam Masters =

1993 video game

- Promotional flyer for Saturday Night Slam Masters featuring an illustration by Tetsuo Hara
- Developer: Capcom
- Publisher: Capcom
- Artist: Tetsuo Hara
- Composers: Masaki Izutani; Setsuo Yamamoto
- Platforms: Arcade; Sega Genesis; Super Nintendo Entertainment System; FM Towns; CPS Changer
- Release: July 1993 (Saturday Night Slam Masters); December 1993 (Muscle Bomber Duo); September 1994 (Ring of Destruction)
- Genre: Fighting
- Modes: Single-player, multiplayer
- Arcade system: CP System Dash

Saturday Night Slam Masters, known in Japan as Muscle Bomber: The Body Explosion, (Note: Japanese: マッスルボマー ザ・ボディー・エクスプロージョン, Hepburn: MassuruBomā za Bodī Ekusupurōjon) is a 1993 pro wrestling fighting game developed and published by Capcom for arcades. The game features character designs by manga artist Tetsuo Hara, famous for Fist of the North Star.

The game was followed by an updated version titled Muscle Bomber Duo: Ultimate Team Battle in 1993, and a sequel called Ring of Destruction: Slam Masters II in 1994.

== Gameplay ==
The original Slam Masters plays like a traditional wrestling game, only the game used a view similar to that commonly used in the fighting game genre. The game uses a three button configuration (grab, attack, and jump).

Each character has two special attacks: a non-grappling technique and a finisher. When an opponent's life meter is depleted, he must either be pinned for a three-count or forced to submit. Defeating all of the other wrestlers results in winning the championship belt, which must then be defended against the entire roster.

There are two game modes: Single Match, where the player fights in a series one-on-one matches against the CPU; and Team Battle Royal (sic), where the player and another partner (controlled by another player or by the CPU) competes in a series of two-on-two matches. The game can be played by up to four players.

== Characters ==
The game features a playable roster of ten wrestlers. Only eight of the wrestlers are selectable in the Single Match mode. The remaining two, Jumbo and Scorpion, are non-playable boss characters in Single Match and selectable only in Team Battle Royal. In the English localization, Capcom changed the names of all the characters and modified much of the backstory. The English names are used in this article, followed by the original Japanese names (when they differ) in parentheses.

Character selection in Saturday Night Slam Masters. From left to right in the character selection row: Jumbo Flapjack, Biff Slamkovich, Gunloc, The Great Oni, Titanic Tim, El Stingray, Mike "Macho" Haggar, Alexander the Grater, King Rasta Mon and The Scorpion.

- Biff Slamkovich (アレクセイ・ザラゾフ; Aleksey Zalazof) – The main protagonist of the series. In the Japanese version of the game, Zalazof is a Russian wrestler who trained under Haggar alongside his rival, Gunloc. No such character connection is established in the English version, although Biff makes a reference to "Comrade Zangief" in his losing quote. Alex from Street Fighter III bears a strong resemblance to Biff.
- Gunloc (ラッキー・コルト; Lucky Colt) – In the Japanese version of the game, Colt is another apprentice of Haggar and Zalazof's rival, explaining the similar fighting styles. The English version implies that Gunloc is a relative of Guile (from Street Fighter II), a character relation that was mentioned again in the Street Fighter: The Movie arcade game where it is revealed that Gunloc is Guile's brother.
- The Great Oni (ミステリアス・ブドー; Mysterious Budo) – A Japanese wrestler who dresses with a kabuki-like theme. He is apparently a rival of El Stingray.
- Titanic Tim (タイタン・ザ・グレート; Titan the Great) – A huge English wrestler who uses both his size and strength to intimidate his opponents. His backstory explains that he was once a tag team partner to Birdie of the Street Fighter series.
- El Stingray (エル・スティンガー; El Stinger) – A Mexican luchador who amazes the crowds with his high-flying speed and techniques.
- Mike "Macho" Haggar (マイク・”マチョ”・ハガー) – Originally one of the main characters from Final Fight. The Japanese version establishes that Haggar's appearance in this game takes place before being elected mayor in Final Fight. However, the English version refers to Haggar as the "former Mayor of Metro City". His daughter, Jessica (also from Final Fight), sometimes enters into the ring to celebrate with him when he wins a match.
- Alexander the Grater (シープ・ザ・ロイヤル; Sheep the Royal) – An Australian wrestler who has a merciless attitude in the ring.
- King Rasta Mon ("ミッシングIQ" ゴメス; "Missing IQ" Gomes) – A wild and feral-like man who acts like a savage beast in combat. He is always accompanied by his pet monkey, Freak, who happens to be his "manager".
- Jumbo Flapjack (キマラ・ザ・バウンサー; Kimala the Bouncer) – A very large and sadistic wrestler who enjoys making his opponents bleed. He is the right-hand man of the Scorpion who serves as the penultimate sub-boss of the game.
- The Scorpion (アストロ; The Astro) – The game's final boss and main antagonist of the series. A mysterious masked wrestler whose true identity and history is shrouded in both mystery and darkness. He is also known to be the leader of the BWA (Blood Wrestling Association).

=== Series ===
The table below summarizes the appearances of every character in the Slam Masters series. A green cell means the character is present in that specific game. A red cell means the character is absent from that game. A yellow cell means the character only appears as a cameo.

Character	Saturday Night	Muscle Bomber Duo	Ring of Destruction
(Russia) Biff Slamkovich	Yes	Yes	Yes
(United States) Gunloc	Yes	Yes	Yes
(Japan) The Great Oni	Yes	Yes	Yes
(Australia) Alexander the Grater	Yes	Yes	Yes
(United Kingdom) Titanic Tim	Yes	Yes	Yes
(Mexico) El Stingray	Yes	Yes	Yes
(Dominican Republic) King Rasta Mon	Yes	Yes	Yes
(United States) Mike Haggar	Yes	Yes	Yes
(Canada) Jumbo Flapjack	Team Battle Royal-only (Note: Playable in Single Match in the Sega Genesis version.)	Yes	Yes
(Germany) Black Widow	No	No	Yes
(India) The Wraith	No	No	Yes
(Canada) Rip Saber	No	No	Yes
The Scorpion	Team Battle Royal-only	Yes	Yes
Victor Ortega	Cameo (Note: Appears in Saturday Night Slam Masters' intro and best Single Match ending, as well as in Muscle Bomber Duo's intro.)	Cameo	Yes

== Ports ==
The original Slam Masters was ported to the Super Nintendo Entertainment System, Sega Genesis and FM Towns. The Super NES version retains the Team Battle Royal mode of Muscle Bomber Duo (which can be played with a Multi-Player Adapter for up to four players), while the Genesis version replaces it with an exclusive Death Match mode. The Genesis version is also the only version of the game that allows the player to select The Scorpion and Jumbo for the Single Battle mode. In contrast to the arcade version, which only used Tetsuo Hara's artwork for promotional illustrations, the console versions of Slam Masters for the Super NES and Genesis use Hara's actual artwork in-game for the attract demo and character portraits.

== Reception ==
Reception

Review scores
Publication	Score
Game Informer	7/10 (SNES)
Next Generation	2/5 (GEN)
Nintendo Power	3.475/5 (SNES)
VideoGames & Computer Entertainment	8/10 (SNES)
Sega-16	7/10 (GEN)

Award
Publication	Award
VideoGames	Best Arcade-to-Home Translation (runner-up)

In Japan, Game Machine listed Saturday Night Slam Masters on their September 1, 1993 issue as being the sixth most-successful table arcade unit of the month. In North America, Play Meter listed it to be the 22nd most-popular arcade game in October 1993.

Reviewing the Super NES version, GamePro praised the four-player gameplay, the variety of moves, and the unique graphical touches to each of the characters. They concluded "If you want a breather from intense fighting games, this wrestling cart's a refreshing break."

A reviewer for Next Generation panned the Genesis version, saying that the game is generic and unoriginal, and that only the barbed-wire ring in the Death Match "[saves] the game from being horrible." He urged wrestling fans to get WWF Raw instead.

Video Games: The Ultimate Gaming Magazine gave the Super NES version an overall score of 8/10 praising the colors and sounds, the smooth character controls, and the gameplay as “slammingly brutal”. Stating the game as “A great home version of a great arcade game.”

In 2018, Complex ranked the game 30th on their "The Best Super Nintendo Games of All Time."

== Sequels ==
=== Muscle Bomber Duo ===
Muscle Bomber Duo: Ultimate Team Battle, released in Japan as Muscle Bomber Duo: Heat Up Warriors, is an updated version of the original Slam Masters. This version eliminates the Single Match mode from the original game, focusing solely on the two-on-two Team Battle mode. The same character can now be chosen by more than one player and each wrestler now has two additional special moves: a dual side attack and a vacuum move. Duo is the only game in the series to retain the Muscle Bomber title for its international releases.

Although the players can choose and pick their team as they please, there are five "official" combinations that the game will recognize and give a name to. The official tag teams are as follows:

- Hyper Cannons (Biff and Gunloc)
- Exotic Warriors (Rasta and Oni)
- Deadly Brothers (Titan and Stingray)
- Knuckle Busters (Haggar and Grater)
- Silent Assassins (Scorpion and Jumbo)

=== Ring of Destruction ===
Ring of Destruction: Slam Masters II, released in Japan as Super Muscle Bomber: The International Blowout, is the proper sequel to Slam Masters, now a CP System II game. Unlike the original, this game was never ported.

The game's format was changed to play more like a traditional one-on-one 2D fighting game with the action restricted to one plane (similar to Street Fighter II), albeit with an emphasis on grappling. Controls were upgraded to five buttons: two punch buttons, two kick buttons, and a grapple button. The objective of each match is to deplete the opponent's life bar in two out of three rounds. It is no longer possible for the player to pin their opponent to win a match, though all other wrestling-style moves have been retained.

All ten characters from the original Slam Masters returned, along with four new selectable characters:

- Victor Ortega (ヴィクター・オルテガ) – A legendary champion wrestler who vanished from the ring for years and has come out of retirement. Ortega was the wrestler who appeared in the intros of both the first and second games. Based on blonde power wrestlers such as Hulk Hogan and "Superstar" Billy Graham, his name is based on Victor Zangiev and Bull Ortega. His special move is the backdrop.
- The Wraith (ザ・レイス) – A supernatural-themed wrestler from New Delhi, India. His special move is the guillotine drop.
- Rip Saber (リップ・セイバー) – A military-themed wrestler from Calgary, Canada who attacks with dangerous weapons.
- Black Widow (ブラック・ウィドー) – A fully costumed wrestler from Hanover, Germany with a spider-motif. Widow's ending reveals that she is actually a female wrestler in disguise. Her special move is the Frankensteiner. Widow is mentioned in Hugo's end sequence in Street Fighter III: 2nd Impact.

In Japan, Game Machine listed Ring of Destruction: Slam Masters II on their November 1, 1994 issue as being the ninth-most successful table arcade unit of the year.

== In other media ==
In the Street Fighter animated series episode "New Kind of Evil", Mike Haggar appears in a fight against Blanka, and the human forms of the three guys who become monsters resemble that of Gunloc, The Great Oni, and Titanic Tim. It is also mentioned in the 1994 arcade game Street Fighter: The Movie that the "Blade" character is actually a deep cover agent named Gunloc in disguise as one of Bison's Shock Troops, and is shown to be Guile's brother (playing into the well-known rumor that the two are related). This is not canon for either game series, as the Japanese version of Slam Masters does not have him related to Guile in any way, shape, or form; the connection made between the two is likely nothing more than a reference to a popular video game rumor.
