= Final Fight =

Video game series

- Genre: Beat 'em up
- Developer: Capcom
- Publisher: Capcom
- First release: Final Fight; November 25, 1989
- Latest release: Final Fight: Double Impact; April 15, 2010
- Parent series: Street Fighter

Final Fight is a series of beat 'em up video games by Japanese publisher Capcom, which began with the arcade release of Final Fight in 1989. Set in the fictional Metro City, within the Street Fighter universe, the games focus on a group of heroic vigilantes who fight against the control and threats of criminal gangs, primarily the Mad Gear Gang. The series has sold 3.2 million units worldwide as of June 2023.

== Video games ==
Release timeline Main releases in bold
1989	**Final Fight**
1990
1991
1992	Final Fight Guy
1993	**Final Fight 2**
1993	Mighty Final Fight
1994
1995	**Final Fight 3**
1996
1997
1998
1999	Final Fight Revenge
2000
2001
2002
2003
2004
2005
2006	**Final Fight: Streetwise**
2007
2008
2009
2010	Final Fight: Double Impact

=== Final Fight series ===
The original Final Fight was directed by Yoshiki Okamoto, and released on arcades. It was followed by two sequels for the SNES: Final Fight 2 in 1993 and Final Fight 3 (Final Fight Tough in Japan) in 1995. The sequels were produced specifically for the home console market by Capcom's consumer division, led by Tokuro Fujiwara, with no preceding arcade versions.

The original Final Fight for the SNES included the playable characters Haggar and Cody but did not include Guy, and omitted the two-player feature. An updated 1992 release, Final Fight Guy, included Guy but not Cody, but still lacked the two-player feature. A parody of the original game, titled Mighty Final Fight, was released for the NES and featured childlike "super deformed" or "chibi" versions of the original Final Fight characters.

A competitive 3-D fighting game spinoff, Final Fight Revenge, was released for Sega's Titan arcade hardware in 1999, which was followed by a home version for the Sega Saturn in Japan only. A 3D sequel titled Final Fight: Streetwise was released in 2006 for the PlayStation 2 and Xbox. A compilation called Final Fight: Double Impact which bundles the original Final Fight with Magic Sword released in 2010.

=== Street Fighter series ===
Multiple Final Fight characters have appeared as playable characters in the Street Fighter series, closely tying the stories of the two franchises together. This first began when Guy and Sodom appeared in Street Fighter Alpha (1995), followed by Rolento in Street Fighter Alpha 2 (1996) and Cody in Street Fighter Alpha 3 (1998). Guy's theme is a remix of the music from the opening stage of Final Fight, while his stage in Street Fighter Alpha 2 features several cameos of characters from Final Fight, such as Cody, Haggar, and some enemy characters.

Andore made a reappearance as a playable character in Street Fighter III 2nd Impact (1997) under the name Hugo, accompanied by Poison as his manager. Both Cody and Guy are playable characters in Super Street Fighter IV. Hugo is in a cameo in a stage and a large statue of Mike Haggar appears in the game, released in 2010. Cody's musical theme is a remix of the intro music from Final Fight. There is a downloadable Mike Haggar outfit for Zangief in Street Fighter IV. Rolento was considered as a playable character for Super Street Fighter IV, but was edged out by Adon as he had slightly more interest. He later appeared in Ultra Street Fighter IV, alongside Hugo and Poison. The construction site from his boss battle features as one of the stages.

The car-vandalizing bonus stage was later used in early versions of Street Fighter II. In Super Street Fighter IV, if Cody or Guy are vandalizing the car in the bonus stage, Mad Gear member Bred will appear and complain, in the same way as he does in Final Fight. Abigail, Cody, Lucia and Poison appear as playable characters via DLC in Street Fighter V. Carlos and Damnd appear as non-player characters in Street Fighter 6, which features Metro City as the central hub of its World Tour mode.

=== Other games ===
Outside of Street Fighter, Final Fight elements have appeared in several other Capcom games. The video game Captain Commando is set in a future version of Metro City. The character Mike Haggar is featured as a wrestler in Saturday Night Slam Masters and its two sequels, Muscle Bomber Duo and Slam Masters II: Ring of Destruction with his daughter Jessica appearing alongside him. Hugo reappears, still accompanied by Poison, in SNK vs. Capcom: SVC Chaos (2003), which features cameo appearances by Damnd and Sodom in Chun-Li's ending.

Guy is a playable character in Capcom Fighting Jam. Cody, Haggar, Jessica, Hugo, and Sodom appear in the game as cameo characters. Guy and Mike Haggar are playable characters in the Namco-published crossover game, Namco x Capcom, which was released for the PlayStation 2 in Japan only. In it, Guy is paired with Sho, a.k.a. Ginzu the Ninja from Captain Commando. Mike Haggar is a playable character in Marvel vs. Capcom 3: Fate of Two Worlds, making him the first character from the Final Fight series to be featured in the Marvel vs. Capcom series. In the game, a stage takes place in Metro City, with the Mad Gear gang fighting the police in the background.

Haggar returns in the game's sequel, Marvel vs. Capcom: Infinite, where he is now the mayor of New Metro City, a fusion of Metro City and Marvel's New York City. Hugo, Poison, Cody, Guy, and Rolento are playable characters in Street Fighter X Tekken. Mike Haggar and several Mad Gear bosses make cameo appearances in this game at the background named "Mad Gear Hideout". Maki Genryusai is the only original character from Final Fight 2 to return as a playable character, appearing in the fighting game Capcom vs. SNK 2 (2001), using many of the same techniques from Final Fight 2 as part of her moveset. Maki features as a trading card in the SNK vs. Capcom: Card Fighters series. The Capcom vs. SNK 2 version of her character featured in the portable versions of Street Fighter Alpha 3 released for the Game Boy Advance and PlayStation Portable.

== Characters ==
=== Protagonists ===
- Mike Haggar – A former professional wrestler, Haggar was the mayor of Metro City during the events of the first three Final Fight games, and fought the Mad Gear gang when they kidnapped his daughter Jessica in the first game. By the events of Street Fighter V, he has retired, with Cody taking over, while a statue dedicated to him can be seen in Street Fighter 6 rendition of Metro City. Outside of the mainline Final Fight titles, he has also appeared in the Saturday Night Slammasters games, Final Fight Revenge, Final Fight: Streetwise, as well as Marvel vs. Capcom 3 and its sequel Marvel vs. Capcom: Infinite.
- Cody Travers – Introduced in Final Fight, Cody was the boyfriend of Jessica Haggar, and helped to rescue her from the Mad Gear gang. However after the events of the game, his constant need to fight others caused him to get arrested and thrown into jail, though he would routinely escape to continue fighting. In Street Fighter V, he makes a playable appearance as the new mayor of Metro City, having reformed. In other games, Cody also appears in Final Fight Revenge, Street Fighter Alpha 3, and Final Fight: Streetwise, with the last game featuring him as an unplayable character while the player assumes the role of his brother, Kyle.
- Guy – Introduced in Final Fight, Guy is a student of the Bushinryu Ninjutsu school and friend of Cody and Haggar who assists with rescuing Jessica. In the Super Nintendo ports of the game, he was omitted due to space issues, but was included in special editions of the game called Final Fight Guy, replacing Cody. In Final Fight 3, he returns to help Haggar and friends take on the new gang threat to Metro City. Guy also appears as a non-playable character in Final Fight: Streetwise, where he now acts as a crime boss. In Street Fighter 6, he takes on two students Kimberly Jackson and Gou, then appointed the latter as his direct 40th successor of the Bushinryu grandmaster, with Gou's son, Ginzu succeeds him as the 41st grandmaster in Captain Commando. Guy also appears in the Street Fighter Alpha series, Final Fight Revenge, Namco × Capcom, Street Fighter X Tekken, Super Street Fighter IV, and Capcom Fighting Jam.
- Maki Genryusai – Introduced in Final Fight 2, Maki is a blonde female ninja. After her sister and father are kidnapped by a revived Mad Gear gang, she asks Haggar for help in rescuing them. She holds a deep rivalry with Guy, who is engaged to her sister. Maki also appears in Capcom vs SNK 2 and the PlayStation Portable port of Street Fighter Alpha 3.
- Carlos Miyamoto – Introduced in Final Fight 2, Carlos is a swordsman friend of Haggar, who helps to rescue Maki's family. In other games, he also appears in Street Fighter 6's World Tour mode.
- Lucia Morgan – Introduced in Final Fight 3, Lucia is a blonde female police officer in Metro City who helps Haggar combat the game's antagonists, the Skull Cross gang. In other games, Lucia was also featured in Street Fighter V: Arcade Edition.
- Dean – Introduced in Final Fight 3, Dean is a tall blonde man with electric abilities. A former street fighter, he seeks revenge against the Skull Cross gang for the murder of his family.

=== Antagonists ===
- Belger – Belger is a large bald man armed with a crossbow that uses a motorized chair for mobility. Acting as Final Fight's main antagonist, he poses as a rich philanthropist while secretly running the Mad Gear gang. Belger orchestrates the kidnapping of Jessica Haggar, but is defeated by Cody who knocks him out a window, sending him to his death. In Final Fight Revenge, he returns as a purple zombie, acting as the game's final boss. His brother, Father Belger, acts as the main antagonist of Final Fight: Streetwise, using a mutagenic drug to get revenge on Metro City.
- Abigail – A very large man with a mohawk hairstyle and black facepaint, Abigail is a member of the Mad Gear gang, acting as their mechanic but prone to bouts of rage. Introduced in Final Fight, he later appears as a playable character in Street Fighter V.
- Poison – Poison is a pink haired woman and a member of the Mad Gear gang, before later reforming and taking up a role as a wrestling manager for the fighter Hugo Andore, traveling with him to recruit others, often forcibly, into their wrestling group. Poison's gender has been frequently changed by Capcom, establishing her as either transgender, cisgender, or with stating it was "up to the player" to decide her gender, at various points in time. Originally appearing in Final Fight, she has since appeared in several other games including Final Fight Revenge, Street Fighter III: 2nd Impact and its sequel Third Strike, SNK vs. Capcom: SVC Chaos, Street Fighter IV, Street Fighter x Tekken, and Street Fighter V. In Nintendo ports of Final Fight, Poison and her palette swap counterpart, Roxy, were replaced by two male enemies, Billy and Sid.
- Rolento – A paramilitary leader allied with Belger, he and his soldiers work with Mad Gear to try and control Metro City, with a dream to start his own military utopian nation. Wearing a yellow uniform and red beret, he fights using grenades and a baton. First appearing in Final Fight, he has since appeared in Final Fight Revenge, Street Fighter Alpha 2 and 3, Ultra Street Fighter IV, Street Fighter x Tekken, and Capcom vs. SNK 2.
- Sodom – A large man wearing a football uniform and a samurai helmet, Sodom is an American enamored with Japanese culture, but frequently mispronounces Japanese letters when trying to speak the language. He is usually armed either with twin katanas or twin sais. A member of Mad Gear, he was first introduced in Final Fight, and later appears in the Street Fight Alpha series as well as Final Fight Revenge.
- Andore Family – The Andores are a large family of tall muscular men in the Final Fight series, all of them bearing a resemblance to real-life wrestler Andre the Giant, introduced in the first game in the series. While most are recurring enemies, one member, Hugo, works with Poison as a professional wrestler, first appearing in Street Fighter III: 2nd Impact.

== In other media ==
The American Street Fighter animated series featured an episode based on Final Fight and titled after the game, which aired during the show's second season. Adapting the plot of the game, the "Final Fight" episode centered on Cody and Guy teaming up with leading Street Fighter characters Ryu and Ken to rescue Jessica from the Mad Gear Gang. Although, Guy and Cody were both characters in the Street Fighter series, the episode predates Cody's first appearance in the series as a playable character in Street Fighter Alpha 3 and depicts him in his character design from Final Fight. The episode is included as unlockable content in Final Fight: Double Impact.

An episode of the 1991 Nickelodeon hidden camera show What Would You Do? featured a Final Fight kiosk, which distracted kids by mentioning personal information about them.

Maki Genryusai appears in the 1996 manga Sakura Ganbaru! as one of several rivals the titular character Sakura Kasugano from Street Fighter Alpha 2 encounters. The Street Fighter II Turbo comic book by UDON Entertainment features a supplemental story arc spanning issues 6 and 7 centering on the Final Fight characters who were featured in the Street Fighter series.

== Reception ==
The actor Robin Williams stated that he named his son Cody Williams after a video game character, which is believed to be Cody from Final Fight. In 2010, Game Informer included it on the list of ten gaming franchises that should be revived, adding: "It's one of many sidescrolling beat-em-ups we'd love to see return, but it's also one of the best."
