= Final Fight 2 =

1993 video game

- North American cover art
- Developer: Capcom
- Publisher: Capcom
- Producer: Tokuro Fujiwara
- Designers: Tatsuya Minami; Hyper Bengie; Ichiro Mihara
- Series: Final Fight
- Platform: Super Nintendo Entertainment System
- Release: JP: May 22, 1993; NA: August 15, 1993; EU: December 1993
- Genre: Beat 'em up
- Modes: Single-player, multiplayer

Final Fight 2 (ファイナルファイト2, Fainaru Faito Tsū) is a 1993 beat 'em up game released by Capcom for the Super Nintendo Entertainment System. It is the direct sequel to the 1989 arcade game Final Fight, which was previously also released for the SNES. Final Fight 2 was developed by Capcom's consumer division with no preceding coin-op version. The game was re-released onto Wii's Virtual Console service in 2009 worldwide.

Unlike the SNES version of the first game, Final Fight 2 supports two-player simultaneous play and has a total of three playable characters. The only playable character from the first game to return is Mike Haggar. Two new player characters were introduced: Carlos Miyamoto and Maki Genryusai. In the game's plot, the three battle the resurgent Mad Gear gang at various locations around Asia and Europe to rescue Maki's sister and father, who are also the fiancée and teacher respectively of Guy from the first Final Fight.

Capcom followed up the game with another SNES-exclusive sequel, Final Fight 3, which saw the return of Guy to the series. None of the new characters from Final Fight 2 returned, although Maki made appearances in various Capcom fighting games years later.

== Gameplay ==
Carlos and Maki battling enemies on the opening Hong Kong stage. Street Fighter character Chun-Li has a cameo appearance in the background.

Final Fight 2 does not deviate much from the original Final Fight in terms of gameplay, although unlike the SNES version of the first game (and the alternate version Final Fight Guy), Final Fight 2 features a two-player cooperative mode in addition to the single-player mode. The player has a choice between three characters: Haggar, who uses professional wrestling techniques; Maki, a female master of the fictional ninjutsu school of Bushin-ryū Ninpō, similar to Guy from the first game; and Carlos, a South American martial artist of Japanese descent who uses a sword for his Special Move. Through use of a code, two players can select the same character. Like in the original game, each character has their own set of fighting techniques and abilities unique to each character.

The gameplay remains the same as in the original game. The player has two main action buttons (Attack and Jump), which when pressed together, makes the player's character perform their Special Move (a third button can also be assigned for this purpose). The player proceed through levels fighting against hordes of underlings before reaching a boss character at the end of each stage. Health-restoring food items and other bonus point items are hidden away in breakable drums and barrels. There are also three retrievable weapons in the game, a tonfa, a piece of lumber and a knife. There is also a "Genryusai Doll" which makes the player invulnerable for a limited period and a "Guy Doll" which gives the player an extra life.

There is a total of six stages in the game, each set in a distinct Eurasian location: Hong Kong, France, Holland, England, Italy and Japan. As in the original game, the player will be pitted against numerous types of recurring enemy characters thorough the game. The only returning enemy characters from the original SNES game are the Andore family. Rolento, a boss character who was in the first Final Fight but omitted from the SNES port, appears as a boss character in this game (with his name spelled "Rolent").

The player can adjust the difficulty (along with other settings) of the game in the options menu. Like in Final Fight Guy, each difficulty setting reveals only a certain portion of the ending, with the full ending being shown only by completing the game on the Expert setting.

The Japanese version of Final Fight 2 features two enemy characters named Mary and Eliza, who are knife-wielding female enemies with acrobatic techniques. Mary and Eliza were replaced by two substitute characters named Leon and Robert in the international versions of the game. Additionally, the first stage boss Won Won, wields a meat cleaver in the Japanese version, which was also removed in the overseas versions.

== Plot ==
After the death of Belger and the defeat of the Mad Gear Gang, the trio of Mike Haggar, Cody, and Guy, who were celebrated as the heroes of Metro City by the citizens had returned to their normal lives; Cody goes on vacation with his girlfriend Jessica, Guy departs on a training journey, and Haggar continues to run Metro City as Mayor. However, the surviving Mad Gear members have secretly regrouped under a new leader and seek their revenge against the trio. They begin by kidnapping Guy's fiancée Rena in Japan, along with her father, Guy's former sensei Genryusai.

Rena's younger sister, Maki Genryusai, calls Haggar and informs him of the situation. Accompanied by his friend Carlos Miyamoto, Haggar travels to Eurasia and meets up with Maki, and the three of them join forces to take on the newly revived Mad Gear. After a series of fights in several countries, the trail leads to Japan where they fight Retu, the new leader of the Mad Gear. The three defeat Retu and rescue Genryusai and Rena. Guy then writes a letter to his friends from abroad thanking them for all they have done.

== Reception ==
Reception

Aggregate score
| Aggregator | Score |
|---|---|
| GameRankings | 68.62% |

Review scores
| Publication | Score |
|---|---|
| Computer and Video Games | 83/100 |
| Famitsu | 7/10, 7/10, 7/10, 6/10 |
| GamesMaster | 75% |
| Hyper | 80% |
| Official Nintendo Magazine | 58/100 |
| Super Play | 75% |
| Total! | 4 |
| Dengeki Super Famicom | 8/10, 7/10, 7/10, 7/10 |
| Electronic Games | 86% |
| Hippon Super! | 6/10 |
| SNES Force | 60/100 |
| Super Action | 70% |
| Super Control | 76% |
| The Super Famicom | 82/100 |
| Super Gamer | 79% |
| Super Pro | 79/100 |
| VideoGames | 7/10 |

According to Famitsu, Final Fight 2 sold 145,455 copies in its first week on the market and 399,756 copies during its lifetime in Japan. The game sold 1.030 million copies worldwide by May 2001, becoming one of Capcom's highest-selling titles and one of the best-selling SNES games. It received a 23.3/30 score in a readers' poll conducted by Super Famicom Magazine. The game also received an average reception from critics, holding a rating of 68.62% based on four reviews according to review aggregator GameRankings.

GamePro's Matt Taylor praised the game's graphics and sound effects, but found the music disappointing compared to the tracks from the first Final Fight and the gameplay predictable. Nintendo Power highlighted the game's visuals and controls, but felt that better enemy AI would have provided a greater challenge. IGN's Lucas M. Thomas called it a "decent brawler experience" but labeled it "pretty straightforward" and "a bit bland", and questioned why Guy was not included when his fiancée was kidnapped in the story.

In 2014, GamesRadar included the game on their best Super Nintendo games of all time list, stating that "We were afraid the sequel might see similar limitations, but this one was built from the ground up for Nintendo's super console, so everything we'd want from an arcade Final Fight 2 made its way to the cartridge. This was the Final Fight we always wanted". In 2018, Complex also included the game on their best Super Nintendo games of all time list, saying that the game is better than its predecessor in every way.
