= Street Fighter X Tekken =

2012 video game

- PlayStation 3 and Xbox 360 cover art featuring Street Fighter's Chun-Li and Ryu versus Tekken's Kazuya and Nina
- Developers: Capcom; Dimps; QLOC (Note: Windows port only)
- Publisher: Capcom
- Director: Taisaku Okada
- Producer: Yoshinori Ono
- Designers: Taketoshi Sano; Yukiko Hokao; Tetsunosuke Seki
- Programmers: Masahiro Taguchi; Takuo Katsura
- Artists: Akira Toba; Kazuma Teshigahara; Toshio Ohashi
- Writers: Emiko Kawasaki; Keisuke Sumiyoshi
- Composer: Hideyuki Fukasawa
- Platforms: PlayStation 3; Xbox 360; Windows; iOS; PlayStation Vita; Shield Android TV, Shield Portable, Shield Tablet
- Release: PlayStation 3, Xbox 360: NA: March 6, 2012; JP: March 8, 2012; EU: March 9, 2012; Windows; May 11, 2012 iOS; September 19, 2012; PlayStation Vita: EU: October 19, 2012; NA: October 23, 2012; JP: October 25, 2012
- Genre: Fighting
- Modes: Single-player, multiplayer

Street Fighter X Tekken (Note: Japanese: ストリートファイター Ｘ 鉄拳, Hepburn: Sutorīto Faitā Kurosu Tekken) (pronounced "Street Fighter Cross Tekken") is a 2012 crossover fighting video game published by Capcom, who co-developed the game with Dimps, for the PlayStation 3, Xbox 360, PlayStation Vita, and with QLOC for Windows. The game features characters from both the Street Fighter franchise and Namco's Tekken series. In the game, players control teams of two characters in tag team fighting matches, with the objective to knock out the members from the opposing team (deplete the opponent's health). In addition to the game's multiplayer modes, the game also features a single-player Story mode with a plot revolving around a mysterious object called the "Pandora".

The game is the product of a partnership between Namco and Capcom that previously produced the role-playing game Namco × Capcom (2005). As Street Fighter X Tekken was made by Capcom (with Namco being involved more in the licensing of the Tekken cast), the gameplay is based on the 2D gameplay of Street Fighter, with projectile moves such as the Hadouken, as opposed to the Tekken series. Unique features in Street Fighter X Tekken include: the Gem System, which allows players to equip special gems to power-up various character attributes and Pandora Mode, in which a character's strength and abilities are temporarily augmented.

The game was well received by critics, who complimented the roster and deep game mechanics. Nevertheless, it fell short of Capcom's sales expectations. In addition, Capcom's release of downloadable content (DLC) for the game was met with criticism when it was revealed that the company was charging for access to characters that were already on the game disc.

== Gameplay ==
Gameplay screenshot showing a fight between Chun-Li and Julia Chang

Developed by Capcom, the core gameplay is similar to that of the Street Fighter series, incorporating elements such as Super Combos and EX Attacks. Players each choose two fighters from the Street Fighter and Tekken series. Both sets of characters are controlled using the Street Fighter six-button system, but the Tekken characters are able to perform Tekken style combos using the primary four buttons in a similar fashion to the Tekken four-button system. These fighters can be switched out normally, or during certain combos. As fights go on, players build up power in a three-sectioned meter at the bottom of the screen referred to as the Cross Gauge, which allow the player to perform various techniques depending on how much of the gauge is filled, such as EX Attacks, Cancels, Super Arts and various Cross techniques detailed below. Additionally, each fighter possesses one special attack that can be charged into an EX Attack or Super Art without any cost to the Cross Gauge. As opposed to the other crossover fighting games released by Capcom, in which the player must eliminate all the opponent's fighters to win, victory conditions are more similar to Tekken Tag Tournament, in which the first player to have one of their fighters' health bars reduced to zero loses the round, thereby the player who wins the most rounds wins the match.

The tag team element of the game is heavily emphasized, with players being able to switch between the two characters in their team in a variety of manners. Switch Cancel allows players to switch partners in the middle of a combo, while Cross Rush combos involve launching the opponent into the air before swapping partners and continuing the combo. Cross Arts, which require a full Cross Gauge, allows players to chain together each character's Super Combo in one straight attack, while the Cross Assault mechanic allows players to simultaneously control both characters in their team until the Cross Gauge runs out.

The game also has two new game mechanics: the Gem System and Pandora Mode. Players equip up to three gems to their characters, which provide different stat boosts depending on the type of gem. Six varieties of gems exist: attack, defense, speed, vitality, assist, and Cross Gauge. Each gem and its effects are designated by a specific color, and will activate as the players fulfill certain conditions during battle. When a character on a player's team has less than 25% health remaining, that character can be sacrificed in order to activate Pandora Mode, which gives the remaining fighter increased strength and an infinite Cross Gauge. However, this state has a time limit and the player automatically loses the round if they cannot defeat the opponent before the Pandora state runs out.

The game features a basic color edit mode. It also has various online options. Two players can battle on the same team, one controlling each character, and face off in four player matches. Scramble mode allows four players to fight simultaneously in pairs of two. The game also supported online training modes which can be played competitively or cooperatively with two players, as well as support the Fight Request feature.

== Plot ==
The center of the conflict between the Street Fighter and Tekken universes is a cubical object that crash-lands in Antarctica. The object is of a mysterious origin and researchers worldwide are unable to determine what purpose it serves. The only thing that can be understood is that when beings come into conflict around this object, it releases a water-like energy that brings more power to the combatants. Due to the object's tendency to react to conflict between beings, they name it "Pandora". While a standard story is given to most combinations of fighters, specific teams, such as Ryu and Ken or Kazuya and Nina, receive their own unique story elements and rival battles cutscenes.

== Characters ==
Street Fighter X Tekken's base roster includes 19 characters from each franchise for a total of 38. An additional 12 fighters, six from each side, were released as DLC for the PlayStation 3 and Xbox 360 on July 31, 2012, and for the PC on February 6, 2013. A code to download all 12 DLC fighters is packaged with the PlayStation Vita version of the game, with owners of the PlayStation 3 version able to obtain the characters for free if they download them through the Vita version. Street Fighter's Dan, seen in the initial Street Fighter X Tekken reveal trailer, also makes a non-playable appearance as the instructor in the game's tutorial mode.

The PlayStation 3 and PlayStation Vita versions also feature five exclusive playable characters: Cole MacGrath from Sucker Punch's Infamous series; Sony mascots Toro Inoue and his rival Kuro, who dress up as Ryu and Kazuya respectively; Bandai Namco's mascot Pac-Man, who pilots a Mokujin-style mech; and Capcom's mascot Mega Man, who takes his appearance from the North American box art for the first game. Both Mega Man and Pac-Man became available as free downloadable content (DLC) for the PlayStation 3 version on March 13, 2012. Nathan Drake from the Uncharted series was also considered for inclusion as a guest character, but the idea was scrapped during development. Yoshinori Ono stated that there is no exclusive character for the Xbox 360 version, stating: "We do have the exclusive characters for the Sony platform. We have Cole, the two Sony cats, Kuro and Toro. But basically for the Xbox 360, we were in discussions with them (Microsoft) for which character to put in as an exclusive, but we weren't able to decide on a character because of differences in timing and things like that."

=== Street Fighter characters ===
- Abel
- Akuma
- Balrog
- Blanka (Note: Downloadable content; available by default on PlayStation Vita)
- Cammy
- Chun-Li (Note: Playable in iOS version)
- Cody
- Dhalsim
- Dudley
- Elena
- Guile
- Guy
- Hugo
- Ibuki
- Juri
- Ken
- M. Bison
- Poison
- Rolento
- Rufus
- Ryu
- Sagat
- Sakura
- Vega
- Zangief

=== Tekken characters ===
- Alisa
- Asuka
- Bob
- Bryan
- Christie
- Heihachi
- Hwoarang
- JACK-X
- Jin
- Julia
- Kazuya
- King
- Kuma
- Lars
- Law
- Lei
- Lili
- Marduk
- Nina
- Ogre
- Paul
- Raven
- Steve
- Xiaoyu
- Yoshimitsu

=== Guest characters ===
- Cole (Note: Exclusive to PlayStation 3 and PlayStation Vita)
- Kuro
- Mega Man
- Pac-Man
- Toro

== Development ==
Yoshinori Ono and Tekken producer Katsuhiro Harada discussing the crossover games plans at San Diego Comic-Con, 2010

Prior to tournament EVO 2010 at Las Vegas, Nevada, Street Fighter IV producer Yoshinori Ono was teasing a yet to be announced game which was initially believed to be a new Darkstalkers entry. Before EVO 2010's Super Street Fighter IV finals, Ono was confronted by Tekken producer Katsuhiro Harada on stage after teasing more of the game that would officially be announced at the 2010 Comic-Con. During the Super Street Fighter IV panel at Comic-Con, Harada appeared out of the crowd and went towards the stage while handing out free copies of Tekken 6, which was met with cheers and boos. Ono and Harada then confirmed the existence of Street Fighter X Tekken. Both the teaser trailer and early gaming footage of Street Fighter X Tekken was also shown at Comic-Con. Other Capcom games are referenced in Street Fighter X Tekken, such as Dino Crisis, which has a stage based around one of its levels.

The PC port of Street Fighter X Tekken was developed by Polish studio QLOC. A portable version of the game was announced for the PlayStation Vita at the Electronic Entertainment Expo 2011. Downloadable content is cross-compatible between both the PlayStation 3 and Vita versions of the game.

During the original announcement, Harada also revealed his own related project, Tekken X Street Fighter, which was being developed by Namco and would follow their 3D style of gameplay used in Tekken. Development of Namco's take to the crossover was put on hold in 2016 and has never been released.

== Marketing ==
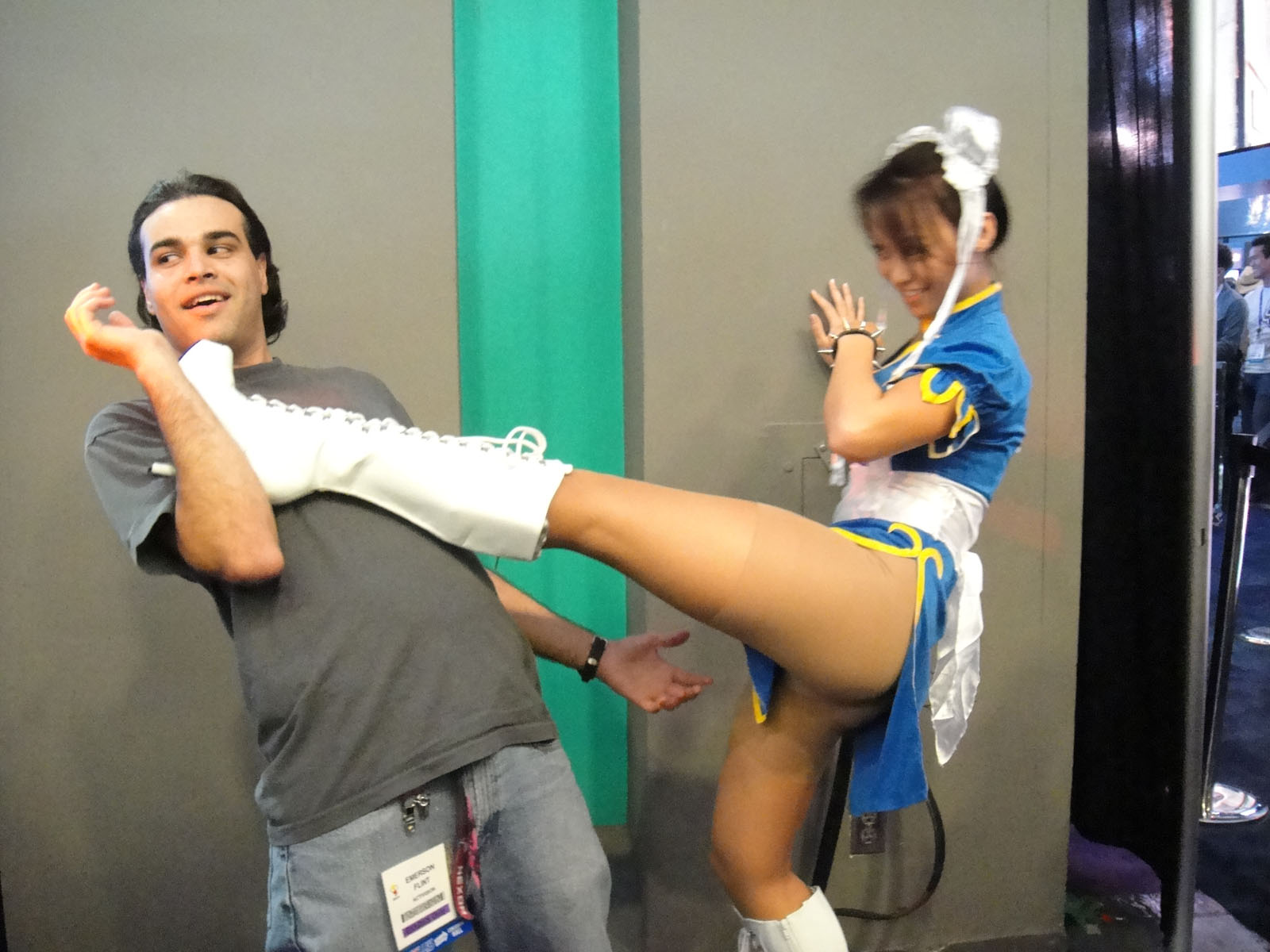
A Chun-Li promotional model posing at the E3 2011 Capcom booth

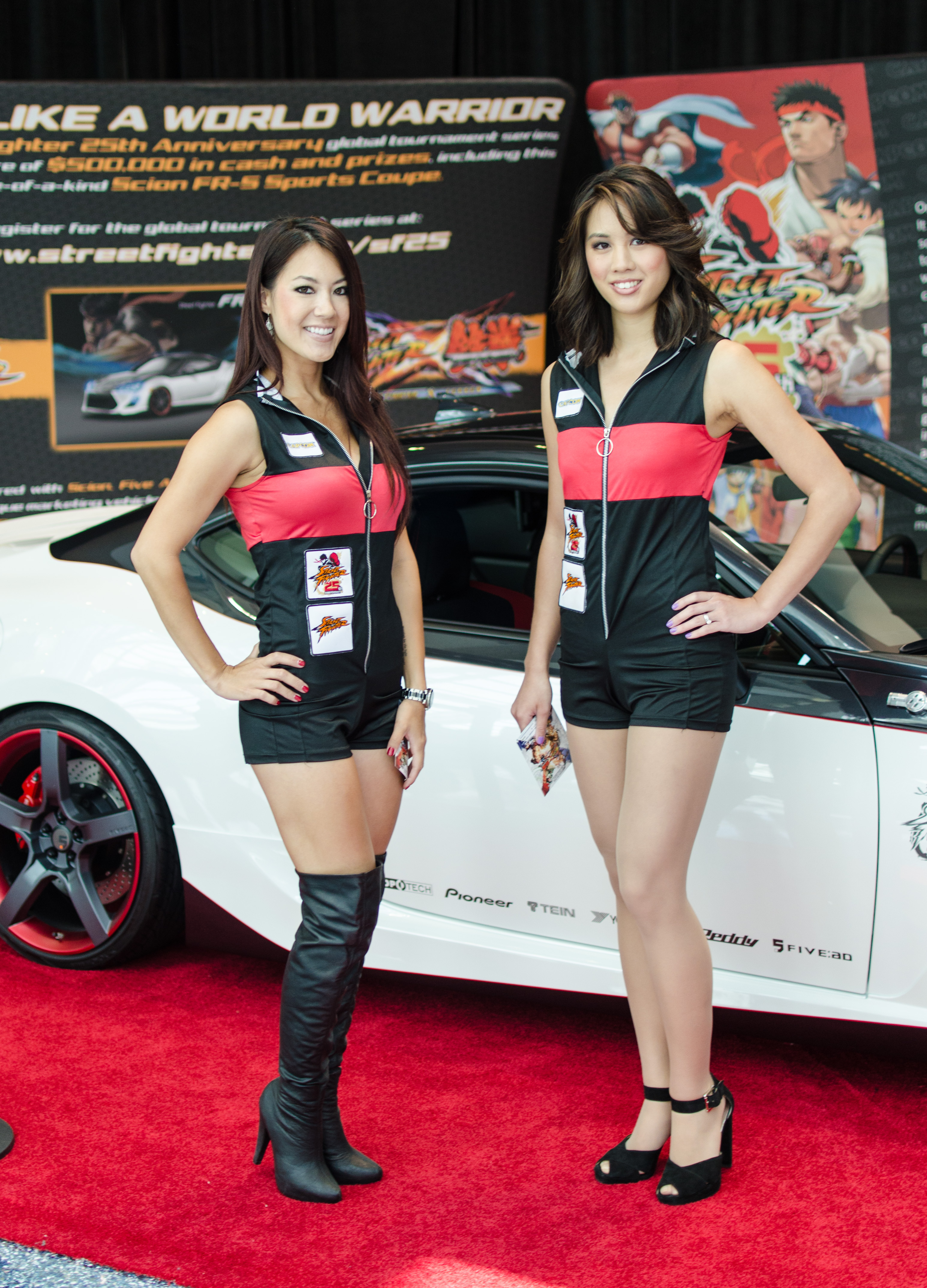
Promotion at E3 2012

Prior to the release of Street Fighter X Tekken, Capcom allowed players to try the game at several Fight Night events. At one such event, Capcom raised over £5,000 for UK charity GamesAid. The music featured in cinematic trailers included "Honest Eyes" by Black Tide, "Knock Me Out" by Street Drum Corps, "In Love With You" by Jared Evan, "My Town" by Hollywood Undead, and "From Heads Unworthy" by Rise Against.

In collaboration with fighting game production groups iPlayWinner and Team Spooky, Capcom announced a special reality show titled Cross Assault, broadcast live via Twitch. The show had ten players chosen by video submission to participate for either Team Street Fighter or Team Tekken in challenges based on Street Fighter X Tekken. The final four players earned Evo Championship Series seeding points for the game's appearance at Evo 2012 with the last player standing winning a $25,000 grand prize. The show ran from February 22–28 with the final taking place at Road to Evo Tournament Season event, Final Round on March 3, 3 days before the game's release.

In PlayStation Home, the PlayStation 3's online social gaming platform, users could pre-order Street Fighter X Tekken directly from Home and receive the in-game bonus, "Boost Gem Trial Pack 1", as part of Home's Total Game Integration. In addition, a portion of The Hub (North America's central meeting point) was redesigned featuring a Street Fighter X Tekken fighting game where users could use their Home avatars to fight each other and unlock Ryu and Kazuya costumes for their avatars (which allow users to throw fireballs and perform custom jump kick attacks) by completing all ten challenges. In 2012, the Total Game Integration received its own dedicated game space.

== Release ==
The Special Edition features a "build-it-yourself arcade cabinet bank" (approximately five inches high), prequel comic book by UDON and 36 gems, which includes all pre-order DLC packs ("World Warrior", "Iron Curtain" and "Lightning Legs") plus an exclusive Special Edition DLC pack ("King of Iron Fist"). The Special Edition also comes with nine exclusive gems ("Cross Arts" DLC) only available as a pre-order bonus for the edition, making it total of 45 gems if the edition is pre-ordered. The Collectors Edition features the "World Warrior" DLC, which includes nine gems, all of which provide characters with different attributes and properties. Also included is a 46 track original soundtrack spanning two discs and a 44-page art book.

In the Asian market, the special edition includes DLC for a complete pack of gems, a two-disc soundtrack, 41 character cards with art on one side and move details on the other, and Bobble Budds bobble heads modeled after Street Fighter producer Yoshinori Ono and Tekken producer Katsuhiro Harada. The three big game retailers in Australia, EB Games, JB Hi-Fi and Game shared three pre-order bonuses. EB Games offers the exclusive Special Edition, JB Hi-Fi offered the standard edition, along with a 60 cm x 90 cm wall scroll featuring Ryu and Kazuya Mishima, while Game offered the standard edition bundled with a Kazuya and Ken T-shirt.

Capcom senior VP Christian Svensson stated that there would be no North American retail release for the PC version, and that it would instead be sold digitally through Steam. However, Asia and Europe would receive a retail box release of the PC version. Ono stated that the reason is that he does not want an on-disc DLC for the PC version and fears that hackers may create mods to crack the game and access the DLC.

== Reception ==
Reception

Aggregate scores
| Aggregator | Score |
|---|---|
| GameRankings | iOS: 78% |
| Metacritic | PS3: 84/100; X360: 83/100; PC: 79/100; VITA: 79/100 |

Review scores
| Publication | Score |
|---|---|
| 1Up.com | A− |
| Destructoid | 8.5/10 |
| Edge | 9/10 |
| Electronic Gaming Monthly | 8.5/10 |
| Eurogamer | 9/10 |
| G4 | 4.5/5 |
| Game Informer | 8.75/10 |
| GameRevolution | 80% |
| GamesMaster | 82% |
| GameSpot | 8.5/10 |
| GamesRadar+ | 8/10 |
| GamesTM | 80% |
| GameTrailers | 8.3/10 |
| Giant Bomb | 60% |
| IGN | PS3/X360: 9/10; VITA: 6.6/10 |
| PlayStation Official Magazine – UK | 9/10 |
| Official Xbox Magazine (UK) | 9/10 |
| PC Gamer (UK) | 65% |
| Play | 83% |
| PSM3 | 8.8/10 |
| VideoGamer.com | 8/10 |
| TouchArcade | iOS: 3.5/5 |

Award
| Publication | Award |
|---|---|
| Game Critics Awards | Best Fighting Game of the Year |

Both console versions of Street Fighter X Tekken received positive reviews from critics. The game received an aggregated score of 84 out of 100 from Metacritic for the PlayStation 3 version and 83 out of 100 for the Xbox 360 version. It was also one of the four games nominated at the 2012 Spike TV Video Game Awards in the category Best Fighting Game, losing to Persona 4 Arena. During the 16th Annual D.I.C.E. Awards, the Academy of Interactive Arts & Sciences nominated Street Fighter X Tekken for "Fighting Game of the Year", which was ultimately awarded to PlayStation All-Stars Battle Royale. Street Fighter X Tekken was also nominated for "Fighting Game of the Year" by Igromania, losing to Dead or Alive 5.

IGN's Steven Hopper called it "a fantastic fighting game that nails the basic fighting mechanics while daring to take a few risks with the formula as we know it." GameSpot stated it is "fun for a wide range of players while still offering the complexity serious fighting fans have come to expect." GamesRadar called it "another fast, fun, and technical Capcom fighting experience." Game Informer claimed that "moderate to hardcore players are going to find a lot to absorb in Street Fighter X Tekken, and players with patience will be rewarded for it." Simon Parkin of Eurogamer wrote: "This ripped, boisterous crossover game arrives in a blaze of creativity, one of an intensity rarely seen in Japanese game output of late. A fierce, passionate marriage then – but one that just might last."

According to PlayStation Official Magazine, "SFXT offers finely tuned and emergent action and a positively regal rumble of the genre's celebrated a-listers." The Official Xbox Magazine stated: "The tag mechanic is brilliantly robust, there are loads of new moves to master and the Tekken characters slot in more comfortably than a bum in a favourite armchair."

PC Gamer said that "Visually it's an astounding achievement", but also said that it was not fun, because the "skill ceiling is so low that almost every combo can end up being a huge one". Game Revolution and Giant Bomb both criticized the gem acquisition system. Destructoid praised the game's modes, drawing attention to the fun four-player Scramble mode, and the training/trial modes.

The PlayStation Vita version, however, received less favorable reviews than its console counterparts. IGN's Vincent Ingenito liked that everything from the console version (including the DLC characters) was in that version, but criticized the graphics, saying that they lost their luster when transitioning to the portable, long loading times, the controls were a bit clunky to get used to, and its "poor competitive balance."

=== Sales ===
By two months after its release, Street Fighter x Tekken sold over one million copies. However, this was about 40% short of Capcom's expectations.

Initially, as of March 31, 2012, Street Fighter X Tekken had sold 1.4 million units worldwide, in contrast to Capcom's expectations that it would sell 2 million units (though sales have since continued to rise to 1.7 million as of March 31, 2014). Capcom has stated that the game's poor performance may be in part due to "cannibalism" of the fighting game genre, meaning too many fighting games were released in too short a time. The PlayStation 3 version got to number 3 in the UK physical sales charts. The PlayStation Vita version received a lukewarm response, selling only 5,420 copies during its first week in Japan. However, in May 2017, following the release of Tekken 7, this version of the game topped the European download chart.

=== Controversies ===
The inclusion of characters on the disc that can only be used by paying more resulted in criticism by fans and publishers, as gamers would pay an additional amount of money for something that was completed before release and on disc. Capcom responded stating they intended to add the characters locked in the retail versions to save hard drive space. Play UK harshly criticized the response by Capcom. ScrewAttack included this on their 2012 list of top ten Capcom mistakes.

Another subject of criticism has been that online tag-team matches are not available for the Xbox 360 version, although the feature was advertised and printed in the manual. Capcom stated this will not be fixed with a patch.

== See also ==
- Tekken X Street Fighter, an unreleased crossover fighting game developed by Bandai-Namco
- Tekken 7, the ninth installment of the Tekken series which features Akuma as a guest character
- Super Smash Bros. Ultimate, a crossover fighting game featuring Ryu, Ken and Kazuya as playable characters
