= Sodom (Final Fight) =

- Final Fight and Street Fighter character
- Sodom in Street Fighter Alpha
- First appearance: Final Fight (1989)
- Designed by: Akira "Akiman" Yasuda
- Voiced by: Wataru Takagi (Street Fighter Alpha series); Sadao Nunome (Street Fighter Alpha: The Animation)

In-universe information
- Fighting style: Self-taught martial arts
- Origin: United States
- Nationality: American

Sodom (Japanese: ソドム, Hepburn: Sodomu) is a fictional character from both the Final Fight and Street Fighter series of video games. He is an American Japanophile, as well as a member of the Mad Gear gang.

== Concept and design ==
Sodom wears tabi and geta, gauntlets, blue jeans, body armor, and a samurai kabuto with a mask. On the front of his outfit, Sodom has attempted to scrawl the Japanese kanji shi (死), meaning "death". However, he has not written the kanji properly, and thus its meaning is lost. He is never seen fighting without a pair of jitte or katana swords, making him one of the few characters to appear in the Street Fighter series to use weaponry. In the Japanese version of Final Fight, the katana are named Masamune and Muramasa. In the first two Street Fighter Alpha games, Sodom uses a pair of jitte as weapons instead of his katana blades from Final Fight. However, in Street Fighter Alpha 3, if the player plays as Sodom in X-ism mode, then Sodom will use his katana blades from Final Fight instead of the jitte.

== Appearances ==
Sodom originally appeared in the 1989 beat-em-up game Final Fight, where he is the boss of the Subway stage. An underground wrestling promoter dressed in a samurai-style helmet and gear, Sodom fights the player in an underground ring in the Metro City's subway, wielding two katana swords. In 1993's Mighty Final Fight, there are three Sodoms (or Katanas, as the character is called in the English version), known as the Three Katana Brothers.

Sodom's first appearance in the Street Fighter series was in the original Street Fighter Alpha: Warriors' Dreams in 1995. According to Tatsuya Minami, senior manager of Capcom's Product Planning and Design section, Capcom included Sodom in the game because he was popular and easy to translate to the one-on-one fighting genre. In the Alpha series, he is characterized as an American Japanophile, who is greatly fascinated by Japanese culture but misunderstands it. After being defeated by Guy in Final Fight, Sodom recognizes his wrong perception of Japan and travels there to re-educate himself. He develops a new fighting style based on Japanese and Western martial arts and trades his swords for a pair of jitte. In the first Alpha, he seeks to rebuild the Mad Gear gang by defeating his rival Guy in combat. In his ending, he reforms the gang and holds up a poster reading "Mad Gear" (魔奴義亜, mado gia; written in ateji). In his ending in 1996's Street Fighter Alpha 2, Sodom goes to a sumo ring in Japan to seek new members for the reformed Mad Gear and ends up being challenged by E. Honda. In 1998's Street Fighter Alpha 3, he seeks a new hideout for his gang and goes to claim Shadaloo's new underground base as his own when he learns about it from his former ally Rolento. He crashes his truck into M. Bison's Psycho Drive to foil his plot. Though he is presumed by Chun-Li and Charlie to have died in the explosion, Rolento expresses his belief that Sodom may still be alive.

Apart from the Alpha series, Sodom appears as a playable character in 1999's Final Fight Revenge.

Sodom appears in Street Fighter (TV series) in the episodes "The Medium Is The Message", "Cammy and the Bachelor" and "Final Fight". In "The Medium Is The Message" he is seen as a fighter competing in the tournament in India, while in "Cammy and the Bachelor" he is working for M. Bison and Shadaloo alongside Birdie. In "Final Fight", he is a member of Mad Gear like in the games, and is defeated by Ryu and Ken.

Sodom makes a cameo appearance in the 1999 anime film Street Fighter Alpha: The Animation as a fighter who travels with Ryu, Ken, Chun-Li and some other fighters to Dr. Sadler's laboratory to find and rescue Ryu's alleged younger brother, Shun, though Sodom's comments hint that he is only doing it to prove he is not a coward. As the fighters battle it out to demonstrate their skills to Sadler, Sodom takes on Ken, but is beaten. He and the other fighters are later imprisoned in a cell to have their fighting Ki stripped, but they are released by Ken and Chun-Li.

== Promotion and reception ==
For Capcom's 15th anniversary of Street Fighter, SOTA Toys released a series of action figures, amongst which was Sodom. The figure was fully posable with 16 points of articulation, and modeled after his Street Fighter Alpha appearance.

Since his debut, Sodom has received mixed reception, particularly for his Street Fighter Alpha portrayals. Gavin Jasper of Den of Geek stated that he was a bit torn on the character, describing him as "the epitome of badass" for how he was introduced and designed in the original Final Fight, and felt like a character that needed expanding upon. In contrast, he felt that while some elements of his Alpha incarnation were good and funny, it left him feeling unsure if the approach was the best way to answer his original mystique. Meanwhile, Koji Kai of Impress Watch described Sodom as a memorable character as well as having a "unique design that combines Japanese and Western elements and a powerful setting". He further called him his favorite enemy from the original Final Fight, and was overjoyed to see him and Guy appear in the Alpha series.

Suriel Vazquez and Eric Van Allen of Paste described him as Capcom's take on otaku culture, and though they felt the character was interesting, stated that he served more as a footnote than a comical and fun addition from Final Fight. Imran Khan, writing for the same publication, was more aggressive in his assessment, stating "Sodom can most accurately be described as the Jabberwock of the Street Fighter universe" and that he "dresses like he tumbled head first through a Japanese history museum on a school field trip", and considered him a character that fans seldom asked to see return.

Others however welcome the possibility of his return to the franchise, particularly due to the fact he is one of the few characters in the Alpha series to not appear in later games. Alex Donaldson of VG247 described Sodom as the most interesting of those characters due to his role as comic relief but also in how his fighting style combines Japanese and American moves. Destructoid's Chris Moyse stated that despite Sodom's "weird clash of styles", the character was a cult favorite. He further felt the character would have fit well with Street Fighter 6's Metro City setting, and his vibrant color scheme and fun visual style suited the game's aesthetic well.

Brandon Sheffield on the Retronauts podcast stated that while initially he thought Sodom's character in Final Fight was a Japanese person, he was surprised to see him portrayed as a "weeaboo" archetype. This gave him the initial impression that the game's developers hated people like him, serving as a character attack against those in the United States that enjoyed their games. Jeremy Parish argued instead Sodom's characterization was meant more to target those that demonstrated no common sense towards their enjoyment of Japanese elements, describing Sodom as a guy that "does not know when to step back and calm down". He further added that due to encountering several people of that sort, he could appreciate the comedic aspect of the character, something Sheffield felt he could also appreciate due to his own past faux pas with kanji.

Video game journalist Drew Mackie examined Sodom for his website Thrilling Tales of Old Video Games, particularly in regards to the reasoning behind the character's name. On the surface he felt it may have been intended as a reference to German heavy metal band Sodom, as many of the characters in Final Fight had similarly themed names amongst Mad Gear despite having no direct visual similarities to said bands. He further suggested that the biblical connotations of the name in relation to sodomy may have been something the Japanese developers were unaware at the time of Final Fight's release, as the term itself is a loan word in Japan. But as the character evolved, his use of Sodom as a name played well into his misunderstanding of language, with Mackie suggesting that Sodom himself was possibly unaware of the connotation. He further praised how the localization teams for the Street Fighter Alpha series were able to convey Sodom's language issues, stating that it helped portray the character as "the poorest communicator in video games. What a weird honor. What a dork."
