= Mighty Final Fight =

1993 video game

- North American cover art
- Developer: Capcom
- Publisher: Capcom
- Producer: Tokuro Fujiwara
- Composers: Setsuo Yamamoto; Yuko Takehara
- Series: Final Fight
- Platform: Nintendo Entertainment System
- Release: JP: June 11, 1993; NA: July 1993; PAL: August 1993
- Genre: Beat 'em up
- Mode: Single-player

Mighty Final Fight (Note: Japanese: マイティ ファイナルファイト, Hepburn: Maiti Finaru Faito) is a 1993 beat 'em up game developed and published by Capcom for the Nintendo Entertainment System. It is a spinoff of Capcom's 1989 arcade game Final Fight, which was previously ported to the Super NES. Unlike the CP System arcade classic and its SNES ports, the characters in this edition are depicted in a comical childlike "super deformed" or "chibi" art style in the same spirit as Famicom games such as both Konami's Kid Dracula and Namco's Splatterhouse: Wanpaku Graffiti.

The game's plot is a comical re-telling of the story from the first game. Like the SNES ports, Mighty Final Fight is a single-player game. However, unlike the SNES versions, it retains all three playable characters from the arcade version. The game also has various features which were taken from the Famicom port of Technos Japan's Double Dragon, including an experience points system allowing players to earn new fighting maneuvers.

Mighty Final Fight was re-released in the 2006 compilation Capcom Classics Mini-Mix for the Game Boy Advance.

== Plot ==
Mighty Final Fight follows the same premise as the original Final Fight. The Mad Gear Gang, the dominant street gang of Metro City, have kidnapped Mayor Haggar's daughter, Jessica. After Haggar is informed of her kidnapping, he sets out to rescue her along with his two friends: Cody, Jessica's boyfriend; and Guy, Cody's training partner. The story is presented in a more comical fashion compared to the original game due to its satirical nature. For example, Belger's motive for kidnapping Jessica in this version is to force her into marrying him, having become infatuated with her.

== Gameplay ==
Screenshot of Mighty Final Fight

Unlike the original arcade game, Mighty Final Fight can only be played by a single player. But unlike the SNES ports, all three main characters from the arcade game are present in a single edition. The player can choose between Cody, a street brawler who fights using a self-made martial art combining karate and boxing; Guy, an agile master of Ninjutsu; or Haggar, a former professional wrestler. The three main characters retain almost all of their abilities from the arcade game, with some aesthetic differences.

The game introduces a leveling system in which the player gains experience points by defeating enemies. The number of experience points awarded after defeating an enemy is depended on the finishing move used by the player, with stronger moves giving more points. After accumulating a certain number of experience points, the player will move to the next level, increasing their attack power and maximum vitality. There are six skill levels in total: Cody and Guy both begin the game at the first skill level, while Haggar begins at Level 3. When the player character reaches Level 4, they will receive an additional special attack which can be performed by rapidly pressing the directional pad left or right and the attack button at the same time. The new move the player gets varies between each character: Cody gains the "Tornado Sweep" energy projectile attack, Guy gets the "Tornado Kick", and Haggar's extra move is the "Running Clothesline" (also known as the "Scramble Haggar Press").

Power-up items are also featured, which includes vitality-restoring food items, extra lives, and even additional chances to continue after a game over. Weapons can also be obtained, but unlike the arcade version, the weapon the player can obtain are dependent on the character. Cody will get a knife, Guy can use a set of shurikens, and Haggar will obtain an oversized mallet.

The game consists of five stages, as well as two bonus rounds, where the player will encounter childlike counterparts of the Mad Gear members from the original game, including bosses such as Thrasher, Masamune, Abigail and Murasame. The final boss is a mechanically enhanced version of the original main antagonist, under the name "Cyborg Belger".

== Reception ==
Reception

Review scores
Publication	Score
AllGame	3.5/5
Electronic Gaming Monthly	28/40
GamePro	14/20
GameSpy	9/10
Jeuxvideo.com	18/20
Mega Fun	61%
Nintendo Power	12.7/20
Official Nintendo Magazine	77/100
Video Games (DE)	55%
VideoGames & Computer Entertainment	6/10
Play Time	58/100

Allgame editor Christian Huey's review was generally positive, stating "While there are better titles to choose from in the genre, Mighty Final Fight has enough going for it to make it a guilty pleasure". In 2013, Arcade Sushi placed Mighty Final Fight 6th on their "10 Best Retro Beat 'Em Ups."

== See also ==
- Super Puzzle Fighter II Turbo
- Super Gem Fighter Mini Mix
