= Street Fighter Alpha =

1995 video game

Street Fighter Alpha: Warriors' Dreams
- North American arcade flyer
- Developer: Capcom (Note: Game Boy Color version developed by Crawfish Interactive.)
- Publishers: Capcom: PlayStation, Saturn, Game Boy Color; JP/NA: Capcom; PAL: Virgin Interactive Entertainment Mobile Gameloft
- Producers: Yoshiki Okamoto; Iyono Pon
- Designers: Noritaka Funamizu; Haruo Murata; Hideaki Itsuno
- Composers: Isao Abe; Syun Nishigaki; Setsuo Yamamoto; Yuko Takehara; Naoaki Iwami; Naoshi Mizuta
- Series: Street Fighter
- Platforms: Arcade, CPS Changer, PlayStation, Sega Saturn, Windows, Game Boy Color, Java ME
- Release: June 22, 1995: Arcade; JP: June 22, 1995; NA: October 1995 CPS Changer; JP: March 1996 PlayStation; JP: December 22, 1995; NA: February 8, 1996; UK: May 22, 1996 Saturn; JP: January 26, 1996; NA: February 1996; UK: May 22, 1996 Windows; NA: 1997; JP: March 12, 1998 Game Boy Color; EU: December 17, 1999; NA: March 24, 2000; JP: March 30, 2001 Java ME; WW: May 10, 2010
- Genre: Fighting
- Modes: Single-player, multiplayer
- Arcade system: CP System II

Street Fighter Alpha: Warriors' Dreams, known as Street Fighter Zero (Note: Japanese: ストリートファイター ZERO(ゼロ)) in Japan, Asia, South America, and Oceania, is a 1995 fighting game developed and published by Capcom for arcades. It was the first all-new Street Fighter game produced by Capcom since 1991's Street Fighter II. Plotwise, it serves as a prequel to Street Fighter II and thus features younger versions of established characters, as well as characters from the original Street Fighter and Final Fight.

The game introduces several new features, expanding on the Super Combo system previously featured in Super Street Fighter II Turbo, with graphics drawn in a similar art style to the one Capcom employed in Darkstalkers and X-Men: Children of the Atom. After its arcade release, it was ported to PlayStation and Sega Saturn home consoles. Street Fighter Alpha received a mainly positive reception; it was followed up by Street Fighter Alpha 2 in 1996 as part of the Alpha sub-series.

== Gameplay ==
Gameplay screenshot of the arcade version, showing a Chun-Li vs. Sodom battle

Street Fighter Alpha revamps the Super Combo system introduced in Super Street Fighter II Turbo by adding a three-level Super Combo gauge. Like in Super Turbo, the Super Combo gauge fills in as the player performs regular and special techniques. When the gauge reaches Level 1 or higher, the player can perform a Super Combo technique. The number of punch or kick buttons pressed simultaneously when performing a Super Combo determines the amount that will be used. In addition to Super Combos, the player can also perform a special counterattacking technique called an Alpha Counter (Zero Counter in the Japanese version) after blocking an opponent's attack, which consumes a level of the Super Combo Gauge.

There are two playing styles that can be selected after choosing a character: "Normal" and "Auto". Auto differs from Normal in that the character automatically guards against a limited number of attacks (provided the character is not in the middle of performing an attack). Auto also allows the player to perform an instant Super Combo by pressing a punch and kick of the same strength simultaneously, but at the expense of reducing the maximum level of the Super Combo gauge to one.

There are also new basic techniques such as Air Blocking, the ability to guard in mid-air, and Chain Combos (also known as Alpha Combos, or Zero Combos in Japan), which are combos that are performed by interrupting the animation of one basic move by performing another of equal or greater strength. In addition to recovering from an opponent's throw, the player also has the ability to roll on the ground when they fall to the ground after an attack.

The single player mode consists of seven random computer-controlled opponents and a final opponent whose identity depends on the storyline of the player's selected character. M. Bison is the final boss for half of the characters. There are also two hidden characters: Akuma, who returns from Super Turbo as an alternate final boss only after certain in-game requirements are met, and a new character named Dan (a popular Capcom spoof character), who challenges the player during the course of the game if certain requirements are met.

The game also features a secret two-on-one Dramatic Battle mode in which two players as Ryu and Ken fight against a computer-controlled M. Bison. The match was inspired by the final fight between the characters in Street Fighter II: The Animated Movie. The Japanese arcade version of the game plays an instrumental rendition of the movie's battle theme, "Itoshisa to Setsunasa to Kokoro Zuyosa to", which was replaced by M. Bison's regular theme in the overseas releases, due to licensing issues.

== Plot ==
Six months after the World Fighting Tournament. The game tells the story of Street Fighter characters in their youth(including Final Fight characters) traveling the world and fighting each other in order to achieve their goals (being defeated by someone else, or simply to reach an opponent). Each fighter has their own storylines, motivations, ambitions, final bosses, and endings.

== Characters ==
The immediate character roster includes Ryu, Ken, Chun-Li and Sagat from the Street Fighter II series, along with Birdie and Adon (Sagat's former apprentice) from the original Street Fighter, who make their first appearances as playable characters in this game. Guy, one of the main playable characters from Final Fight, also appears along with Sodom, a boss character from the same game. New to the series are Charlie Nash, Guile's combat buddy who uses the same special techniques, and Rose, an Italian female fortune teller who uses an energy known as "Soul Power" who has ties to series antagonist M. Bison.

In addition to the ten regular characters, there are also three boss characters in the game. Street Fighter II antagonist M. Bison appears as a final opponent for many of the characters in the single-player mode, while Akuma from Super Street Fighter II Turbo once again appears as a secret final opponent. Another secret character, Dan, Capcom's parody of SNK characters Ryo Sakazaki and Robert Garcia, makes his first appearance in this game. All three characters can be selected by the player by inputting a specific code for each.

== Development ==
Production for the game started in October 1994, after the release of Darkstalkers: The Night Warriors. The development team was given only three months to complete a game from scratch, but took six months to develop Street Fighter Alpha.

During the game's development, Capcom was buying back CPS-1 boards from arcades at the time in order to help sell the CPS-2 boards, a practice that Capcom was doing at the time, leading to a significant stockpile of CPS-1 boards. Street Fighter Alpha was initially developed for the older CPS-1 hardware in order to make use of the leftover CPS-1 stock, but was then later developed for the newer CPS-2 hardware when Capcom also had a significant stockpile of CPS-2 boards during the CPS-1 to CPS-2 transition. Both versions were developed simultaneously with each other, with the CPS-1 version having several differences from its CPS-2 counterpart such as a different-sounding soundtrack with less sound effects, among others. The creation of a CPS-1 version of the game also allowed Capcom to sell the game to arcades that could not afford the upgrade to CPS-2 hardware, with publicity testing versions of the CPS-1 version of Street Fighter Alpha being released to the arcades in limited quantities.

The prototype name was Street Fighter Classic, as it was meant to take place between Street Fighter and Street Fighter II. The name eventually changed to Street Fighter Zero. However, Capcom Public Relations in North America disliked the name, as it sounded very negative. The title was announced in the U.S. market as Street Fighter Legends, and then renamed Street Fighter Alpha in western territories (except Brazil), to sound more like a new beginning.

== Release ==
Due to the small amount of character animation data in Street Fighter Alpha, Capcom was able to do a relatively straight port to the Sega Saturn and PlayStation; source code from the arcade version is incorporated into both home versions. Both versions feature an arranged soundtrack with a choice between the Arranged and Original versions. In addition to a dedicated two-player "Versus Mode", these were also the first console Street Fighter games to feature a Training Mode, allowing players to practice their techniques and combos on a non-hostile character. As part of their Capcom licensing deal, the home versions were published in Europe by Virgin Interactive Entertainment instead of Capcom. The PlayStation version of Street Fighter Alpha was re-released for the PSP and PlayStation 3 via the PlayStation Network on August 14, 2008 in North America. The CPS-1 version of the arcade game was released for Capcom's CPS Changer as a mail order release in 1996 in Japan. A version for Windows PC was released in 1998, based on the PlayStation version.

A Game Boy Color version (converted by Crawfish Interactive) was released in 1999, featuring downscaled graphics and sound. The Game Boy Color version has no link cable support and is single-player only. The Japanese version of the Game Boy Color version was released using the Alpha name, rather than the Zero name.

The original Street Fighter Alpha and its sequels are featured in Street Fighter Alpha Anthology for the PlayStation 2. The version of Alpha in this compilation features Arcade, Versus and Training modes like the previous PlayStation and Saturn versions, as well as Survival and Dramatic Battle modes. The Dramatic Battle on the main menu differs from the one in the original arcade game in that the player can select any pair of characters and face against a series of four computer-controlled opponents (Adon, Sagat, M. Bison and Akuma), not just Ryu and Ken against Bison. Furthermore, the player can turn on an option to allow Super Cancels, that is, canceling a special move into a Super Combo.

Street Fighter Alpha was one of the twelve games released as part of the Street Fighter 30th Anniversary Collection in its emulated arcade form. This version is on the PlayStation 4, Xbox One, Nintendo Switch and Windows with the feature of save states.

== Reception ==
=== Commercial ===
In Japan, Game Machine listed Street Fighter Zero as the second most successful arcade game of July 1995. It went on to be the second highest-grossing arcade game of 1995 in Japan, below Virtua Fighter 2. In North America, RePlay reported Street Fighter Alpha to be the most popular arcade game of August 1995. In the United Kingdom, it was among the nineteen best-selling PlayStation games of 1996, according to HMV.

=== Critical ===
Reception

Review scores
Publication	Score		
Publication	Arcade	PS	Saturn
Computer and Video Games	92%	96%	96%
Electronic Gaming Monthly		36.5 / 40	
Famitsu		27 / 40	80%
Game Informer			8 / 10
GameFan		300 / 300	283 / 300
GamePro		5 / 5	
GamesMaster		93%	92%
Mean Machines Sega			94%
Next Generation	3/5		
Play		93%	
PlayStation: The Official Magazine		8 / 10	
Maximum		5/5	5/5
Sega Saturn Magazine			93%

Awards
Publication	Award
Gamest Awards (1995)	4th Best Game, 4th Best Fighting Game, 2nd Best Direction, 6th Best Graphics, 7th Best VGM
Electronic Gaming Monthly, GameFan	Game of the Month

Reviewing the arcade version, Computer and Video Games praised the improved sprite graphics and innovative gameplay features such as the revamped Super Combo system and the new Alpha Counter mechanic. The review said it is "fast, exciting, visually explosive and for our money a dead cert hit." A critic for Next Generation criticized the game's lack of major changes from previous iterations of the series, but concluded, "Capcom's right, in a way. Street Fighter only needs subtle changes for now; it's already got the most important thing: great gameplay."

Electronic Gaming Monthly gave the PlayStation version their "Game of the Month" award, and reviewers for Electronic Gaming Monthly, GamePro, and Maximum all hailed it as being virtually identical to the arcade version, though some of them complained about the load times. GamePro called it "easily the best argument that the PlayStation is not just a polygon-based system", while Maximum deemed it "the next logical evolvement of the most popular fighting game of all time." Reviewers were also pleased with Alpha's new gameplay mechanics such as alpha counters.

Reviewing the Saturn version, Sega Saturn Magazine commented: "The graphics are great, the sound's great, it plays very well indeed and it's tough enough to keep you going for ages even without a second player to hand." However, they also remarked that the game was outclassed by the recently released X-Men: Children of the Atom and that most gamers should get that one instead. GamePro criticized that some of the game's new characters were not as powerful or fun to play as the series regulars, but praised the gameplay additions and deemed the Saturn version "a near-perfect arcade conversion." Maximum argued that while the game has fewer characters and backgrounds than Super Street Fighter II Turbo and makes few innovations to the series, it is refined to the point where "Everything that Street Fighter does so well has been taken to new levels in Alpha." They commented on the accuracy of the Saturn version and gave it their "Maximum Game of the Month" award. Both GamePro and Maximum particularly applauded the coloration of the Super Move shadows in the Saturn version. In 1996, GamesMaster ranked the game 43rd on their list of the "Top 100 Games of All Time".

=== Accolades ===
The Game Boy Color version was a runner-up for GameSpot's annual "Best Game Boy Color Game" and "Best Fighting Game" awards, losing to Dragon Warrior I & II and Capcom vs. SNK: Millennium Fight 2000, respectively.

== Legacy ==
=== Sequels ===
Street Fighter Alpha was followed by two sequels: Street Fighter Alpha 2 in 1996 and Street Fighter Alpha 3 in 1998. Like Alpha, the two games were originally released for the arcades, followed by a few upgraded editions and home versions. All three games in the series and their variations were included in the PlayStation 2 compilation Street Fighter Alpha Anthology, released in 2006.

=== Related media ===
A manga adaptation based on the original Alpha and Alpha 2 by Masahiko Nakahira was published in Gamest game from 1995 to 1996, and was later adapted into English by UDON in 2007. Two different animated adaptations were also produced: Street Fighter Alpha: The Animation in 1999 and Street Fighter Alpha: Generations in 2005.

== Sources ==
- Erik Suzuki; Matt Taylor; Graham Wolfe (1996). Street Fighter Alpha Strategy Guide. Dimension Publishing.
- Studio Bent Stuff (September 2000). All About Capcom Head-to-Head Fighting Games 1987-2000. A.A. Game History Series (Vol. 1) (in Japanese). Dempa Publications, Inc. ISBN 4-88554-676-1.
