= Final Fight (video game) =

1989 video game

- Arcade flyer
- Developer: Capcom (Note: Home computer versions developed by Creative Materials; Sega CD version developed by A Wave.)
- Publishers: Capcom: Arcade; WW: Capcom; AU: Leisure & Allied Industries Home computers U.S. Gold Sega CD Sega Game Boy Advance; WW: Capcom; EU: Ubi Soft
- Producer: Yoshiki Okamoto
- Designers: Akira Nishitani; Akira Yasuda
- Artist: Akira Yasuda
- Composers: Manami Matsumae; Yoshihiro Sakaguchi; Yasuaki Fujita; Hiromitsu Takaoka; Yoko Shimomura; Junko Tamiya; Harumi Fujita
- Series: Final Fight
- Platform: Arcade: Super NES, Amiga, Amstrad CPC, Atari ST, Commodore 64, ZX Spectrum, X68000, Sega CD, CPS Changer, Game Boy Advance, Java ME
- Release: November 25, 1989: Arcade; JP: November 25, 1989; NA: January 1990 Super NES; JP: December 21, 1990; NA: November 10, 1991; PAL: December 10, 1992 Final Fight Guy; JP: March 20, 1992; NA: June 1994 Home computers; EU: 1991; NA: 1991 X68000; JP: July 17, 1992 Sega CD; JP: March 26, 1993; NA: April 1993; PAL: July 1993 CPS Changer; JP: 1994 Game Boy Advance; JP: May 25, 2001; NA: September 26, 2001; PAL: September 28, 2001
- Genre: Beat 'em up
- Modes: Single-player, multiplayer
- Arcade system: CP System

Final Fight (Note: Japanese: ファイナルファイト, Hepburn: Fainaru Faito) is a 1989 beat 'em up game developed and published by Capcom for arcades. It is the seventh title released for the CP System hardware. Set in the fictional Metro City, the player controls one of three street fighters: former pro wrestler and city mayor Mike Haggar, expert brawler Cody Travers, and modern-day ninja Guy. The trio set out to rescue Jessica (Haggar's daughter and Cody's girlfriend) when she is kidnapped by the Mad Gear Gang.

The game began development as a sequel to the original Street Fighter released in 1987, under the working title Street Fighter '89 (Note: Japanese: ストリートファイター'89, Hepburn: Sutorīto Faitā '89). However, its genre was switched from a fighting game to a beat 'em up, and the title was changed to Final Fight following the success of Technōs Japan's Double Dragon. Final Fight was ported to various home computers and consoles, including the ZX Spectrum, Super NES and Sega CD.

It became a major commercial success in arcades, selling 30,000 arcade units worldwide while becoming the highest-grossing arcade game of 1990 in Japan and the year's highest-grossing arcade conversion kit in the United States. The Super NES version also sold 1.5 million cartridges worldwide. Now considered one of the greatest video games of all time, it spawned the Final Fight sub-series from the Street Fighter series, followed by several sequels. Its development team later worked on the original Street Fighter II, and some of the characters from Final Fight later appeared as playable fighters in other entries of the franchise, such as the Street Fighter Alpha sub-series.

== Gameplay ==
Cody and Guy, both at left, seen at the start of the game's first level. Cody wears jeans and a T-shirt. Guy wears a sleeveless orange keikogi.

Final Fight can be played by up to two players simultaneously. Before the game begins, the player chooses between the three main characters: Haggar, Cody and Guy. Each has his own fighting style and attributes. Health gauges are displayed for both player and enemy characters.

The controls for Final Fight consist of an eight-way joystick and two buttons, one each for attacking and jumping. By entering different combinations of joystick moves and button presses, the player can perform a variety of attacks:

- A flurry of standing punches/kicks
- A jumping forward kick
- A downward-directed jumping attack that can stun the enemy
- A grab at the enemy, allowing the player to either deliver further strikes or throw/slam them to the ground
- A spinning attack, which knocks down all enemies in the vicinity but drains a portion of the player's health

Obstacles such as barrels, trash cans and oil drums can be broken open to reveal weapons (pipes, swords, knives), health-restoring food and items awarding bonus points; these can be picked up by standing over them and pressing the attack button. Weapons have limited uses and will disappear if the player is disarmed by an enemy too many times or when the player moves to a new area. If the player is carrying a weapon, they will drop it upon picking up a new one.

Each character also has an ability unique to that character:

- Cody can strike with found knives repeatedly, instead of just a single throw, vastly increasing his melee damage while active.
- Guy can jump off walls or the edge of the screen to evade attacks, and transition directly into his flying side kick afterward, giving it great range.
- Haggar can grapple foes during his grabs and perform a spinning piledriver, the most powerful player attack without a weapon.

Final Fight consists of six stages or "rounds", as well as two bonus rounds. Each round takes place in a different section of Metro City such as the Slums and the Subway; most rounds feature more than one section, and all have a time limit. The player confronts a boss character at the end of each round, culminating in a fight against gang leader Belger in the sixth and final round.

One life is lost whenever the player runs out of either health or time. The game ends when all lives are lost, but the player may spend a credit to continue from that point and choose a different character if desired.

== Plot ==
The game is set in a fictional city on the Atlantic coast in the United States named Metro City, analogous with New York City. According to the game's intro, in the 1990s, or 1989 in the Japanese version, the city's crime rate reached alarming levels, but since the election of pro wrestler turned politician Mike Haggar as the new Mayor, Metro City was changed and cleaned up drastically. Under his term, Haggar managed to suppress the crime rate of the city to its lowest points.

While the citizens of Metro City were thankful for Haggar's hard work in curbing crime, the Mad Gear Gang, who had served as the dominant criminal organization of Metro City, would not go down so easily. Under the leadership of the crooked businessman Belger, the group attempted to bribe Haggar with a large payoff to keep him from going after them, to which Haggar refused. Still determined to bring Haggar under their rule like the last mayor before him, Mad Gear proceeded to kidnap his daughter Jessica and create further unrest among the citizens.

When Haggar finds out about his daughter's abduction, he becomes furious and decides to take his fight against Mad Gear to a personal level. Seeking additional manpower, Haggar recruits Cody Travers: an expert fighter and Jessica's boyfriend, as well as Guy: a ninja in training and Cody's good friend/rival. The three dedicate themselves to the complete eradication of the Mad Gear Gang, and to rescue Jessica from their clutches.

The game gained notoriety for its unique continue screen, where the player character is shown tied to a chair with a lit bundle of dynamite on the table in front of him; the character struggles to escape as the 10-second time limit counts down. If the player activates the continue option, a knife falls from the ceiling and cuts the fuse.

== Development ==
The game was designed by Akira Nishitani, and produced by Yoshiki Okamoto. When coming up with the game's concept, Okamoto cited the arcade game Double Dragon II: The Revenge (1988) as his basis for Final Fight. The game was originally shown at trade shows under the title of Street Fighter '89. According to Okamoto, the sales division of Capcom originally requested a Street Fighter sequel, so his team decided to promote Final Fight as a Street Fighter sequel at trade shows (going as far to refer to one of the main characters as a "former Street Fighter"). The title was changed to Final Fight before its official release after feedback from operators stating that the game was nothing like Street Fighter.

According to the developers, they were originally planning to have Ryu and Ken Masters from the original Street Fighter as the playable protagonists, but that idea was scrapped for a new plot and new settings, involving the kidnapping of an attractive young woman by a city gang. Capcom's president wanted the team to develop the game as if it was a film, so he made the team watch a number of films. Nishitani's team then approached the "planning and design as if it were a movie."

The street gang the player faces in the game, the Mad Gear Gang, takes their name from the 1987 overhead racing game Mad Gear by Capcom; the game was released as Led Storm outside Japan. Many of the characters are named after 1980s rock musicians such as Axl Rose (Axl), Slash (Slash), Gene Simmons (Simons), Sid Vicious (Sid), Billy Idol (Billy), King Diamond, Abigail, named after King Diamond's second album, also dons facepaint similar to King Diamond's, Sodom (Sodom), Roxy Music (Roxy), The Damned (Damnd) and Poison (Poison), with another, 2P (Two.P), being from the Capcom game Forgotten Worlds. Hugo Andore, another notable enemy character, is based on André the Giant.

Capcom believed that "players would feel bad beating up a woman", so they noted in the arcade game's manual that the female opponent Poison was a "newhalf". However, the arcade manual would not have been available to the general public during the machine's tenure, and nothing within the game itself suggests that Poison is transgender. The other female enemy - Roxy - remains a cisgender woman, so it is likely that the manual note was purely a legal safety net in case of complaints.

The soundtrack was the work of seven sound composers: Manami Matsumae, Yoshihiro Sakaguchi, Harumi Fujita, Junko Tamiya, Yasuaki Fujita (in his first work for Capcom), Hiromitsu Takaoka and Yoko Shimomura. Despite this, Sakaguchi is the only composer credited in the game (as "Youkichan's Papa"). The other six were confirmed as having worked on Final Fight in 2014 when the Clarice Disk imprint of City Connection released the Final Fight Original Sound Collection, which featured the original soundtracks to the three original Final Fight games and its accompanying ports.

In a 2007 interview, Retro Gamer magazine asked Akira Nishitani about the game's similarities to the 1984 film Streets of Fire. Nishitani said that, at the time, the team were not "aware of Streets of Fire, but I've Googled it and there does indeed seem to be something familiar about it" but that "this style of story was very popular back then" and many "fighting games made use of it" so "I guess we were part of that crowd!"

Despite these claims, the official interview in the Japanese book "How to Make Capcom Fighting Characters" ( ストリートファイター キャラクターメイキング ) released in 2018 has Nishitani explaining that during development his boss K.Tsujimoto asked him literally to watch "all the movies" by Walter Hill, especially Streets of Fire referred to by fellow developer Akiman (Akira Yasuda) in the same conversation. The movies were viewed on three different monitors at the same time as they "lacked time", then he literally "cut and pasted" movie stills in the specially dedicated "Video Materials Room". Also, when asked if Streets of Fire was the main influence giving the impression of being in "Downtown New York" in Final Fight, Akiman replied positively. Other sources of inspiration included Les Misérables, namely the protagonist Jean Valjean who becomes a mayor in the latter half of the story and his role as a devoted father, and the manga series Mad Bull 34, which influenced Haggar's appearance.

== Home versions ==
=== Super NES (Final Fight and Final Fight Guy) ===
Roxy and Poison (first two from left), as depicted in the Japanese Super Famicom port, were replaced with Sid and Billy (third and fourth) in the international Super NES versions of the game.

A port of Final Fight for the Super Nintendo Entertainment System was released as a launch title for the platform in Japan in 1990, in North America in 1991, and in the PAL region in 1992. It was released for the Wii's Virtual Console service in 2007 and the Wii U's Virtual Console in 2013. The Super NES port removed the two-player co-op option, the Industrial Area level and the playable character Guy. Most of the scene transitions were also edited out. In the arcade version, the player characters would be seen exiting the levels and breaking through doors unlike in the Super NES version.

Due to hardware limitations, the Super NES version could only display two or three enemies on-screen, in contrast to the CPS arcade version, which could display up to nine or ten enemies on-screen. To make up for this difference, the Super NES version features more stopping points than the arcade version and the enemy placement is vastly different.

The English localization of the Super NES port was censored for its content and features several differences from its Japanese Super Famicom counterpart: the first two bosses, Damnd and Sodom, were renamed Thrasher and Katana, respectively; Belger's wheelchair was re-drawn to look like an office chair; Poison, a woman with pink hair, and Roxy, a woman with red hair, were replaced with two male enemies named Billy and Sid.

All alcohol references were removed, with two health-recovering items replaced; the line "Oh! My God", spoken by an enemy when his car is destroyed during the first bonus stage, was changed to "Oh! My Car"; the blood splash effect shown when a character is stabbed was replaced by a generic explosion; and some of the darker skinned enemy characters were given lighter skin tones. The original soundtrack was ported for the Super NES by Toshio Kajino, credited as "Bull".

A revised edition of the Super NES port, titled Final Fight Guy, was released in Japan in 1992. This version replaced Cody with Guy as a selectable character (with a new opening and ending sequence explaining Cody's absence), included four difficulty settings, and added other new features such as two new power-ups, although the Industrial Area stage and the two-player mode were still omitted. In June 1994, an American version of the game, featuring the same changes in the localization as in the first game, was released as a rental-only game that was initially available at Blockbuster stores. It was later given a limited release. Kajino's music port was retained for that version.

=== U.S. Gold versions ===
U.S. Gold released ports of Final Fight for the Amiga, Atari ST, Commodore 64, ZX Spectrum and Amstrad CPC for the European market in 1991. These ports were developed by Creative Materials. The ZX Spectrum version was released as part of the Super Fighter compilation with Pit Fighter and WWF WrestleMania.

=== X68000 ===
The X68000 version was released by Capcom exclusively in Japan on July 17, 1992. This version is a relatively close conversion of the arcade game, with the only notable changes being different music (with a choice between a MIDI soundtrack and one using the X68000's internal sound chip) and a lower maximum on-screen enemies. The game came packaged with a CD soundtrack with all new remixed tunes.

=== Sega CD (Final Fight CD) ===
The Sega CD version, titled Final Fight CD, was ported by A Wave and published by Sega under license from Capcom in 1993. This version retains nearly all the features of the arcade game that were removed in the two Super NES ports (namely the two-player mode, the Industrial Area stage and the ability to play as any of the three main characters) and adds voice acting to the game's opening and ending sequences, an arranged version of the original soundtrack, and an exclusive time attack mode. However the maximum number of on-screen enemies were still lower than the arcade version and the combo attacks of Cody and Guy are much slower. Furthermore, the graphics suffered from a more limited color palette, as well as fewer background details. Like the Super NES version, the Sega CD version was censored for the English localization with many of the same changes. Poison and Roxy were kept, but were redrawn with less revealing clothing.

=== Game Boy Advance (Final Fight One) ===
The Game Boy Advance version that was developed by Sun-Tec, titled Final Fight One, was released in 2001. Final Fight One features all three characters and the Industrial Area stage that was missing from the Super NES version. The two-player cooperative mode is also featured via link cable. Dialogue scenes prior to each boss battle have been added and the Street Fighter Alpha 3 renditions of Cody and Guy are featured as hidden playable characters. Other unlockable features include alternate palettes for each player character and the ability for two players to use the same character. The character and background designs are lifted from the Super NES versions rather than the original arcade version, with the enemy placement being similar to Final Fight Guy, although the maximum number of on-screen enemies was increased and all the transition sequences were restored. The same new power-up items introduced in Final Fight Guy are also present in this version, along with a new Cody doll item. The English localization of the game featured the same changes as the two Super NES versions.

=== Capcom Classics Collection ===
Final Fight is included in the 2005 compilation Capcom Classics Collection Volume 1 for the PlayStation 2 and Xbox and in the 2006 portable version Capcom Classics Collection Remixed for the PlayStation Portable. The game is emulated from the original CP System arcade version and features very little differences from the arcade game. The compilation includes tips, character profiles, an art gallery and a sound test as bonus features.

=== Final Fight: Streetwise ===
The arcade version is also included as a hidden bonus game in the 2006 game Final Fight: Streetwise for the PlayStation 2 and Xbox. However, the emulation in this version was programmed by Ultracade, rather than Digital Eclipse (the developers of Capcom Classics Collection series). The controls cannot be adjusted and the quality is lower than other emulated versions.

=== Final Fight: Double Impact ===
The arcade version of Final Fight was released in a two-in-one bundle titled Final Fight: Double Impact, alongside the arcade game Magic Sword, released digitally for Xbox 360 and PlayStation 3. Added features include various graphic filters, including an arcade cabinet view; online drop-in multiplayer; an arranged soundtrack composed by Simon Viklund; and extra content such as concept art, fan art, Street Fighter comic pages featuring Final Fight characters and the "Final Fight" episode of the Street Fighter animated series, which are unlocked by completing certain in-game challenges. The game was ported and developed by Proper Games and released for Xbox Live Arcade for 800 Microsoft points and April 15, 2010, for PlayStation Network for $9.99. The PS3 version features a very restrictive DRM protection which circumvents the ability other PSN games have to be shared among several PSN accounts. The DRM protection was met with a negative response as it had not been disclosed previous to the game's release. On March 27, 2012, Double Impact was released as part of the Capcom Digital Collection for the Xbox 360.

=== iOS ===
On September 15, 2011, Final Fight was released into Apple's iTunes Store. This version includes all three characters from the Arcade version, a multiplayer feature that can only be used with Wi-Fi and a special items where one can turn on Extra Lives, Super Special and Meat Explosion. However, the game no longer became available after the latest iOS updates from Apple.

=== Capcom Beat 'Em Up Bundle ===
In 2018, Final Fight was re-released alongside Captain Commando, The King of Dragons, Knights of the Round, Warriors of Fate, Armored Warriors and Battle Circuit in Capcom Beat 'Em Up Bundle for PlayStation 4, Xbox One, Nintendo Switch and Microsoft Windows.

== Reception ==
Contemporary reception
Review scores
Publication	Scores				
Publication	Arcade	GBA	Sega CD	SNES	ZX
Computer and Video Games			95%	92%	
Crash					90%
Electronic Gaming Monthly			28/40		
Famitsu		31/40		8/10, 6/10, 6/10, 5/10; 7/10, 8/10, 7/10, 7/10	
GamePro			4.5/5	5/5	
Mega			92%		
MegaTech			94%		
MicroHobby					88%
Sinclair User					81%
Your Sinclair	88%				77%
Zzap!64	Positive				

=== Commercial ===
In Japan, Game Machine listed Final Fight on their January 15, 1990 issue as being the second-most-successful table arcade cabinet of the month. It went on to be the highest-grossing arcade game of 1990 in Japan (according to the annual Gamest charts), as well as Japan's second-highest-grossing arcade game of 1991 (just below Street Fighter II).

Overseas, the game had a successful launch in North America and Europe. In the United States, it was a blockbuster hit, becoming the top-grossing new video game on the RePlay arcade charts in February 1990, and then the top-grossing software conversion kit for eight months in 1990, from March to April, then from June to October, and then December. During November and December, weekly coin drop earnings averaged $183.50 per kit. It ended the year as America's highest-grossing arcade conversion kit of 1990. Final Fight sold a total of 30,000 arcade units worldwide.

The Super NES version was also a commercial success. It sold 1.5 million copies worldwide, becoming one of Capcom's best-selling games on the platform.

=== Critical ===
The game was acclaimed by critics. Mega magazine compared the Sega CD version of the game favorably against the incomplete and "poor" Super NES version and placed it top of their list of the best Sega CD games of all time. The four reviewers of Electronic Gaming Monthly declared it a strong conversion of a game with "solid fighting action", though two of them also commented that "the necessity of the CD is questionable at best."

Bran D. Butter reviewed the SNES version, giving it a generally favorable review, calling it a "classy beat 'em" and praising the "superb" graphics. However, the review criticized missing features from the arcade original, including the lack of two-player, missing levels and the missing player character Guy. On release of the Game Boy Advance version of the game, Famitsu magazine scored it a 31 out of 40.

=== Accolades ===
In the February 1991 issue of the Japanese coin-operated video game magazine Gamest, Final Fight took the No. 1 spot as the Best Game of 1990 in the 4th Annual Grand Prize. Final Fight also won the category of Best Action Game, placed No. 4 in Best Video Game Music, No. 9 in Best Graphics, No. 2 in Best Direction and No. 5 in Best Album. The character Mike Haggar was displayed on the cover of this issue, who took the No. 1 spot in the Top 50 Characters of the year, with Guy in second place, Cody at No. 7, Poison at No. 26, Sodom at No. 33 and Jessica at No. 40. In a 1991 Gamest reader poll, Final Fight was voted the second-best arcade game of all time, just below Valkyrie no Densetsu (1990). In 1995, Total! ranked the game 87th on its list of the "Top 100 SNES Games" saying that "Tragically, it's missing one of the main characters but this was still a stonking conversion."

Crash gave the ZX Spectrum port a "Crash Smash" award. MegaTech gave the Sega CD port a "Hyper Game" award.

=== Retrospective ===
Retrospective reception

Aggregate score
Aggregator	Score	
Aggregator	SNES	Wii
GameRankings	71.23%	

Review scores
Publication	Score	
Publication	SNES	Wii
GameSpot		6.7/10
IGN		8/10
Nintendo Life		7/10

In 1997, Nintendo Power ranked the SNES version as the 97th best game on any Nintendo platform. Retro Gamer included it among the top ten Sega CD games, describing it as "arguably the best home console conversion (aside from recent emulated ports)" of "unquestionably the quintessential arcade hit of the late Eighties." IGN ranked the SNES version 100th on their Top 100 SNES Games of All Time. In 2018, Complex ranked Final Fight 87th on their "The Best Super Nintendo Games".

== Legacy ==
Final Fight was followed by a few sequels. The total sales of the Final Fight series have totaled 3.2 million units for home systems.

The Super Famicom version of the game is a key element in the plot of the manga Hi Score Girl and its Netflix anime adaptation.
