= Street Fighter (UDON comics) =

Comic book series by Capcom

- Street Fighter Legends: Cammy #1; Guest cover art by Frank Cho

Publication information
- Publisher: UDON
- Schedule: Monthly (irregular)
- Format: Ongoing series
- Genre: Science fiction
- Publication date: Since August 2003
- No. of issues: 108 issues, 4 graphic novels

Creative team
- Written by: Ken Siu-Chong; Jim Zubkavich; Chris Sarracini; Matt Moylan
- Artist(s): Arnold Tsang; Alvin Lee; Joe Ng; Jeffrey 'Chamba' Cruz; Edwin Huang; Omar Dogan; Hanzo Steinbach

UDON's Street Fighter comic book series are based on the Street Fighter video game franchise published under license from Capcom. This series draws not only on the established Street Fighter canon, but also occasionally addresses various continuity retcons, and even draws from fanon and non-official sources as well. UDON's Street Fighter comics are stated to share the same continuity with other Capcom franchises like Darkstalkers, Rival Schools and Final Fight.

== Series ==
=== Street Fighter (2003–2005) ===
Spans issues #0 through #14, published from August 2003 to February 2005. Written by Ken Siu-Chong, and illustrated by Alvin Lee, Andrew Hou, Arnold Tsang and Rob Ross. Compiled in the hardcover book Street Fighter: The Ultimate Edition in 2011, and in the hardcover editions Street Fighter Classic Volume 1: Hadoken (issues #0–10) and Street Fighter Classic Volume 2: Cannon Strike (issues #11–14) in 2013–2014.

==== Plot ====
===== Issues #0–6 =====
While training in Japan, Ryu rushes to the dojo after hearing a loud cry and finds his master Gouken murdered. He travels to San Francisco to inform his best friend and training partner, Ken, about their master's death and deduces that Gouken was murdered by his own brother, Akuma. The two decide to go back to Japan to avenge their master's death and are accompanied by Ken's fiancée, Eliza.

Meanwhile, Guile is investigating Shadaloo after the disappearance of his friend and mentor, Charlie Nash. Officer Gibson informs Guile that the organization is keeping several tabs on Ryu after he defeated Sagat in the last Street Fighter tournament. He later meets Interpol agent Chun-Li, who is also investigating Shadaloo after the criminal organization kidnapped her father. Believing that Ryu could be a potential lead towards Shadaloo's leader, M. Bison, the two fly to Japan to find him.

After getting intel of Ryu's whereabouts from Killer Bee, M. Bison sends Vega to Japan. While searching through Tokyo, Vega easily defeats and humiliates the sumo wrestler E. Honda in front of his fans, including Sakura Kasugano, who also sets her sights on locating Ryu after learning about his accomplishments. Vega then bumps into Ken and Eliza and places a tracking device on Eliza's scarf. He attacks the couple in their hotel room, but Ken overpowers him and forces him to retreat. Ken takes Eliza to the hospital, where she encourages him to find Ryu and warn him about Shadaloo.

Near Gouken's dojo, Chun-Li and Guile are attacked by Charlie, who was brainwashed by Shadaloo to become their assassin known as “Agent Shadow.” Guile stops the fight by giving Charlie his dog tags, which helps restore his memory and prompts him to retreat. They later recover at the same hospital Eliza is at, where she criticizes Guile for abandoning her sister Julia and informs them about her encounter with Vega. As Ken finds Ryu in Gouken's dojo, Guile calls him and they decide to meet at the Miyazaki Shrine. Sakura overhears their conversation as she was at the hospital to get treatment for Dan Hibiki, a dojo owner she defeated during her search for Ryu.

Before leaving the dojo, Ryu has a run-in with Sagat, who warns him that Bison plans to brainwash him and use his power for evil. On the way to the shrine, Guile and Chun-Li reunite with Charlie, who has recovered from Bison's brainwashing. He informs them that Bison can control others with his Psycho Power and that Chun-Li's father was murdered by Bison's “Doll Agents” led by Killer Bee. When they are suddenly attacked by Bison piloting a helicopter, Charlie sacrifices himself to send both him and Bison off the cliff to their supposed deaths.

At the shrine, Ryu senses Akuma's presence and challenges him. Akuma easily defeats Ken and later Sakura when she attempts to prove herself to Ryu. After witnessing Ryu show signs of the Dark Hado, Akuma tells Ryu to face him at the next Street Fighter tournament before knocking the young fighter out. Ryu realizes he needs to travel the world and improve his technique if he wants any chance of defeating Akuma. Ken initially agrees to go with him, but later decides to go back to America after learning that Eliza is pregnant. Sakura volunteers to become Ryu's new travel partner so he can train her to become a better fighter.

Meanwhile, the fortune-teller Rose uses her mystical powers to free Killer Bee from Bison's control. Killer Bee is left in front of the British Embassy in Rome so she can begin her new life under her new name, Cammy.

===== Issues #7–14 =====
Since gaining her freedom, Cammy has joined a British Secret Service Special Operations Unit called Delta Red, where she has become an invaluable member thanks to her time as Killer Bee. While she doesn't fully remember her time as an assassin, she does have nightmares of her actions. During one of their missions, they capture the Doll Satsuki. Though the rest of her team has no luck interrogating the Shadaloo assassin, Cammy succeeds by pretending to be her former self. She learns about her past and Shadaloo's plans to use Psycho Power to restore Bison's body and render all conventional weapons of war obsolete. Satsuki later escapes with help from Juni and the brainwashed Dee Jay.

After returning from her sabbatical, Chun-Li is assigned to investigate Shadaloo triad gangs that are involved in the film industry led by Dolls Xiayu and Jianyu. Hong Kong's biggest film star, Fei Long, agrees to help her take them down after a director from one of the gangs attempts to blackmail and later assassinate him. When their leads run dry, Chun-Li seeks assistance from her former mentor, Gen. The three manage to track down and defeat Xiayu and Jianyu, but the two Dolls escape after Gen coughs blood and tells Chun-Li he's dying of leukemia.

At the hideout, Interpol finds out that Bison's Psycho Drive is being developed in Brazil, so they send Chun-Li there to work the case with Delta Red. Upon arriving, she attacks Cammy after recognizing the operative as the assassin who murdered her father, but realizes she's not the same person she was before. Shadaloo's head scientist has the Dolls kidnap Cammy to reprogram her, but she is rescued by Delta Red. The scientist and the Dolls escape with the last parts of the Psycho Drive after forcing them to battle one of their brainwashed prisoners, Blanka. However, Blanka ceases attacking after recognizing Cammy since she tortured him as Killer Bee.

Ryu and Sakura travel to Thailand to find Sagat. They are confronted by Sagat's former student, Adon, who challenges Ryu to a fight and loses. He informs them how much Sagat's changed ever since losing to Ryu and that he's gone to India to seek guidance from Dhalsim. Ryu is then invited to come to Las Vegas so he can be included in Ken and Eliza's wedding pictures. On the way to the airport, he teaches Sakura how to perform the Hadouken. Guile is also in Las Vegas attending the wedding festivities while attempting to rekindle his relationship with Julia and their daughter, Anna.

Ken's engagement party is crashed by Balrog and Vega, with the latter seeking revenge for his defeat in Japan. Ken is critically injured during the fight, but Ryu, Sakura, and Guile manage to hold the Shadaloo henchmen off until the police arrive. In the hospital, Eliza tells Julia that Guile helped save Ken's life and convinces her to forgive him. Ryu and Sakura part ways at the airport, with Sakura returning to Japan for school while Ryu flies to India to find Sagat and Dhalsim. Cammy pays her respects to Chun-Li's father and vows to atone for her sins and find out more about her past. While observing Cammy, Rose has a vision that Bison has healed from his injuries.

=== Street Fighter II (2005–2006) ===
Spans issues #0 through #6, published from October 2006 to November 2006. Written by Ken Siu-Chong and illustrated by Alvin Lee, Jeffrey 'Chamba' Cruz and Skottie Young. Compiled in the hardcover book Street Fighter II: The Ultimate Edition in January 2011 and as a part of Street Fighter Classic Volume 2: Cannon Strike in 2014.

==== Plot ====
Ryu arrives in India and asks Dhalsim to train him after seeing how it has improved Sagat's fighting style. He gains more control over his emotions, but still finds it difficult to maintain his rage against Akuma. Dhalsim informs him that Gen has defeated Akuma in the past, prompting Ryu to travel to Hong Kong to meet him. Gen's teachings prove to be the opposite of Dhalsim's as he encourages Ryu that the only way to defeat Akuma is to give in to the Dark Hado. As Ryu leaves feeling conflicted, Gen has his long-awaited rematch with Akuma and dies shortly afterward.

Cammy takes a leave of absence from Delta Red to investigate Bison's Dolls and her past with Chun-Li. They find that two of the Dolls were part of the Thunder Foot Tribe and travel to Mexico to discuss the case with one of the tribe's representatives, T. Hawk. He informs them that the two women were abducted days before a chemical plant forced his tribe to evacuate their ancestral land. Before they can investigate, Chun-Li returns to Hong Kong after learning of Gen's death.

Guile receives a tip from Officer Gibson that the plant is a front for Shadaloo, but later discovers that she was actually a Doll disguised as Gibson to lead Cammy and T. Hawk into an ambush from the Dolls and Bison. They are assisted by Rose, who reveals that she possesses the good part of Bison's soul after he emptied it from his body to master Psycho Power and that Cammy is a clone of Bison that he could use to transfer his consciousness. Bison destroys Rose's body and blackmails Cammy into coming with him after revealing he's holding Delta Red hostage. He then sends out invitations to fighters all around the world to take part in the next Street Fighter tournament, which he plans to use to select candidates for his army.

=== Street Fighter Legends: Sakura (2006) ===
Street Fighter Legends: Sakura (original edition 2006, reprinted 2016, hardcover 2015) - A four-issue mini-series that focuses on the life of Sakura Kasugano and the events that happened since she and Ryu parted ways at the end of Street Fighter #14. Written by Erik Ko and Ken Siu-Chong, and illustrated by Omar Dugan.

==== Plot ====
As Sakura returns to school after her summer vacation, Ryu advises her to be more adaptable with her style and learn more from other fighters. This inspires her to attend one of Rainbow Mika's wrestling matches. She ends up teaming up with Mika to take on Zangief after he challenges Mika to a rematch during her autograph session. Their victory over Zangief catches the attention of Sakura's rival, Karin Kanzuki, who invites Sakura to challenge her at any competition she wants. Sakura decides to take her on at Japan's upcoming hot dog eating contest hosted by E. Honda.

After training and not eating for three days, Sakura faces off against Karin in the hot dog contest, with her friends Kei, Hinata, Shoma, and Natsu cheering for her in the audience. Karin appears to have a strong lead, but Sakura's friends discover that Karin was cheating as she's been feeding the hot dogs to her servant, Ishizaki. Karin and her servants ambush Sakura knowing she's too weak to fight after eating the hot dogs, but she and her friends manage to fend them off. Honda declares Ishizaki as the winner and teaches Sakura that she can learn from both her successes and failures.

Throughout the story, Dan makes multiple attempts to challenge Sakura to a rematch to test her abilities, but is continuously interrupted or knocked out before he can do so. He finally gets his chance the day after the hot dog contest and is defeated by her once more and taken to the hospital. As Sakura thanks Ryu for his advice, Dan invites her to join his dojo.

=== Street Fighter Legends: Chun-Li (2009) ===
Street Fighter Legends: Chun-Li (original edition 2009, hardcover 2015) - A four-issue mini-series that follows Chun-Li as a young police officer, portraying the events that lead up to her father's disappearance. Written by Erik Ko and Ken Siu-Chong, and illustrated by Omar Dugan.

==== Plot ====
Taking place before the events of the first comic, M. Bison sends Sagat to Hong Kong to steal statues from Qin Shi Huang's Terracotta Army, as they are rumored to contain spiritual and psychic energy. Chun-Li works as a young police officer alongside her partner, Po-Lin. After stopping a pair of criminals working for Sagat, they agree to work on the Shadaloo case with Chun-Li's father, Dorai. Po-Lin has a personal investment in the case as her parents were killed by gangs linked to Shadaloo.

Meanwhile, martial artist Go Hibiki recently moved to Hong Kong to open his own dojo with his son, Dan. A Shadaloo gang tries forcing him to pay a bribery fee, but he easily defeats them, leading them to seek help from Sagat. Sagat overwhelms and kills Go after the dojo master manages to kick his right eye out. Dan refuses to cooperate with the police as he wants to avenge his father's death himself. Chun-Li and Po-Lin head to the hospital after learning of Sagat's eye injury only to find that he has escaped.

Dorai tries to get leads from his longtime friend Gen, but Gen has lost the killing intent and is no longer involved in the criminal underworld. Chun-Li notices Po-Lin becoming more unhinged when confronting Shadaloo criminals, costing them valuable intel in the process. Dorai is called to the Hong Kong Royal Museum to break up a fight between Fei Long and Lee at the Terracotta Army exhibit, leading him to figure out Shadaloo's plans to steal the statues based on what the museum curator told him about the security staff and finding that Chun-Li and Po-Lin apprehended men possessing museum security uniforms. They are attacked by Shadaloo assassins shortly after finding out, but Gen defeats all of the hired guns and forces them to tell Dorai where they are storing the statues.

Chun-Li, Dorai, and Po-Lin ambush Sagat and his men on a barge. Despite holding their own against the Muay Thai master, Po-Lin's aggressive approach allows Sagat to escape with six of the statues. After touching one of the statues, Sagat has a vision depicting his eventual loss to Ryu. Believing no one should have this power, he destroys the statues and informs Bison that Dorai stopped them. One week later, Po-Lin tells Chun-Li that she's resigning from the police force after realizing how she's letting her desire for vengeance ruin her life. Chun-Li asks Dorai if she would make the same mistakes Po-Lin did if she lost him the same way, but her father trusts her to make the right decisions. Unbeknownst to the two, they are being secretly monitored by Killer Bee.

=== Street Fighter II: Turbo (2008–2010) ===
Spans issues Street Fighter II: Turbo #1 through #12, published from October 2008 to March 2010. Written by Ken Siu-Chong and illustrated by Jeffrey 'Chamba' Cruz. Compiled in the hardcover edition Street Fighter Classic Volume 3: Psycho Crusher in 2014.

The second Street Fighter tournament begins in earnest as fighters from all over the world compete to see who is the "World's Strongest". It is a continuation of UDON's Street Fighter II series.

==== Plot ====
Bison displays the power of his Psycho Drive to the world as he announces the next Street Fighter tournament. He initially has Cammy back under his control, but Vega secretly releases her as he detests Bison's brainwashing. Cammy continues pretending to be Killer Bee so she can figure out a way to free Delta Red. Guile and Chun-Li accept the invitations as it would allow them to closely investigate Bison's ultimate weapon. Ken goes to Alaska to retrieve Ryu, who is still struggling with his inner demons.

Balrog, Vega, and Sagat host three preliminary qualifying tournaments around the world. Chun-Li, Dhalsim, and Fei Long qualify in the Hong Kong finals, E. Honda and Zangief qualify in the Japan finals, and Ryu, Ken, Guile, and T. Hawk qualify for the American finals after defeating Cody and members of the Mad Gear Gang in Metro City. Bison places Cammy in the finals alongside the brainwashed Blanka and Dee Jay.

At the tournament, Cammy meets up with Guile and Chun-Li and the three formulate a plan that would allow them more time to investigate the island and destroy Bison's Psycho Drive. In the first round, Cammy defeats T. Hawk, Guile defeats Blanka, Dhalsim defeats Dee Jay, Ken defeats Zangief, Ryu defeats E. Honda, and Chun-Li throws her fight to Fei Long. Bison tries to have Dhalsim killed for releasing Dee Jay from his mind control, but the yoga master escapes and withdraws from the tournament. In the quarterfinals, Ryu defeats Fei Long and Guile throws his fight to Cammy.

In the semifinals, Cammy and Balrog knock each other out and are both eliminated. Ken defeats Vega with help from E. Honda and decides to withdraw from the tournament to return to his family. Ryu wins in his rematch with Sagat and is the only fighter in the tournament left to face off against Bison, who reveals he has brainwashed Ken, E. Honda, and T. Hawk to become part of his army. Before they can fight, Akuma appears and battles Bison so he can duel Ryu himself.

With Bison occupied, Guile and Chun-Li rescue Delta Red and destroy the Psycho Drive, draining Bison of his powers and freeing the other fighters in his control in the process. In a last-ditch effort, Bison attempts to transfer his soul to Cammy's body, but Rose's soul takes possession of him, giving Akuma the chance to finish him off with the Shun Goku Satsu. As the other fighters evacuate the crumbling island, Ryu chooses to remain behind to face Akuma. As they fight, Ryu nearly gives in to the Satsui no Hado, but ultimately refuses to become like his enemy. Enraged, Akuma prepares to end him, but he is saved by the sudden arrival of Gouken. Dhalsim manages to teleport Ryu off the island before it is destroyed. Ryu is left unsure of whether he truly saw his master alive or not.

Most of the fighters return to their normal lives after the tournament, and Shadaloo becomes leaderless and powerless without Bison. In Japan, Ken has a sparring match with Ryu before he gets married, while Ryu decides to train not out of vengeance, but to better himself as a fighter.

=== Street Fighter IV (2009) ===
A four-issue mini-series published between February–October 2009. Written by Ken Siu-Chong and illustrated by Joe Ng. Compiled in the hardcover editions Street Fighter IV: Wages of Sin (with exclusive bonus stories featuring the casts of Street Fighter III, Street Fighter IV, and Final Fight) in 2014.

Based on the Street Fighter IV video game, it follows the events of a new fighting tournament sponsored by the enigmatic S.I.N. organization. The events take place concurrently with the second half of the Street Fighter II: Turbo series.

==== Plot ====
Alongside the Doll program, Bison also developed the “Human Incubator Project”, which developed human clone bodies equipped with the “Tandem Engine” that allowed them to perfectly copy fighter moves. One of the clones, designated as “Number Fifteen”, was more intelligent than the others and was put in charge of operations of the Shadaloo Intimidation Network (S.I.N.), where they created the Blece device that drains fighters powered by the Satsui no Hado. Fifteen orders his top enforcer, Crimson Viper (who is secretly an undercover agent for the C.I.A.), to apprehend Sakura and bring her to the base.

While competing on a Japanese game show called Samurai Warriors alongside Dan, Sakura meets and befriends a Mexican luchador chef named El Fuerte. They are confronted by Rufus, who wants Sakura to take him to fight Ken, but all of them are attacked and knocked out by Viper. Viper kidnaps Sakura and Dan as both of them appear to possess some capacity of the Satsui no Hado. Viper's helicopter is tracked by an amnesiac French mercenary named Abel, who has been investigating S.I.N. sites to find the kidnapped fighters and learn more about his past.

Fifteen offers Viper a permanent role at S.I.N. while revealing that they are testing the Blece machine on weaker fighters with dark ki until Bison can power it indefinitely with Ryu. Before Fifteen attempts to drain Sakura and Dan, he finds Abel breaking into the base. He recognizes Abel as one of Shadaloo's human incubators and is outraged that the mercenary has free will. As he battles Abel, Viper frees the rest of the fighters while overloading the Blece device with a virus. Akuma arrives, having been attracted by the large amount of Dark Hado, and battles Fifteen. When he unleashes the Shun Goku Satsu on the clone, Fifteen doesn't die as he has no soul to attack, but he is left unconscious due to the Blece device shutting down. After Akuma leaves, Abel takes the rest of the fighters in a helicopter to escape the facility.

Fifteen eventually wakes up after the Blece device is rebooted. He finds that the large blast of energy and ki from the virus and his fight with Akuma has freed him from Bison's influence. He decides to name himself Seth after the Biblical character of the same name and vows to use his own power to claim everything Bison has. Two months later, Sakura and her family visit El Fuerte's restaurant with his idol, R. Mika, and Viper's superior informs her S.I.N. is operational again and that Seth has replaced her with a new enforcer.

=== Street Fighter Legends: Ibuki (2010) ===
Street Fighter Legends: Ibuki (original edition 2010, hardcover 2016) - A four-issue mini-series that follows the young ninja Ibuki as she tries to balance a normal Japanese high school life with her secret ninja life. Written by Jim Zubkavich and illustrated by Omar Dogan.

==== Plot ====
During her last year at high school, Ibuki meets a new student in her class named Makoto, the master of the Rindoukan martial arts dojo. Makoto finds out Ibuki is also a fighter and challenges her to a match after school. Before they can battle, Ibuki is ambushed by a ninja from the rival Geki clan and assisted by someone from the Glade of Ninjas. The next day, Ibuki has Makoto promise not to tell anyone else in their class that she's a ninja. Later at school, they meet and befriend a transfer student from Kenya named Elena, who is also a martial artist. Ibuki's best friend Sarai becomes angry that she's spending more time with other fighters and stops speaking to her.

Despite the difficulties of balancing her school work and ninja duties, Ibuki succeeds at her midterms, maintaining a social life with Makoto and Elena, and progressing with her ninja training. Months later, Sarai apologizes to Ibuki for avoiding her out of jealousy. Ibuki promises her that she will speak to grandmaster Enjo to take her on as a student so she can become a fighter too. The Glade later tasks Ibuki with her final ninja exam, to face off against the legendary fighter, Oro. She feels immense pressure to confront him after hearing how powerful he is, but she eventually builds up the courage to fight him. As she and her friends go to find him, the Geki ninja is released from prison and informs his clan where the Glade of Ninjas is. Ibuki locates Oro at a hidden shrine on Mount Atago. Despite her hesitance, she successfully displays her power to Oro, who tells her that she passed the test. Makoto challenges Oro as well, but he tells her she is not ready as she is too angry to strike effectively.

The group is then ambushed by Geki ninjas. They return to the Glade after finding it in flames and continue fighting the other ninjas until Ibuki is captured by the Geki Alpha. The Alpha reveals that the Geki found Ibuki as an abandoned baby and planned to raise her to become the perfect assassin, but Enjo betrayed them and defected from the clan as he believed Ibuki deserved to grow up and make her own choices in life. Enjo kills the Alpha and forces the Geki clan to surrender. Three weeks later, Ibuki begins attending Sarsuberi University just as Sarai is accepted into the Glade. Much to her dismay, she finds out she also has to endure post-secondary ninja training at college. A few months later, she has her long-awaited match with Makoto, with Elena and her fellow clan members watching.

=== Super Street Fighter (2013, 2015) ===
Super Street Fighter Volume One: New Generation (February 2013, hardcover 2013). It is a sequel to Street Fighter II: Turbo comics, taking place in the time period of the Street Fighter III video game. Written by Ken Siu-Chong, Jim Zubkavich and Chris Sarracini, and illustrated by Joe Ng and Jeffrey 'Chamba' Cruz.

Super Street Fighter Volume Two: Hyper Fighting (March 2015, hardcover 2015). Two short stories from Volume 2 were fully released in Street Fighter #0 Free Comic Book Day comic book in 2014. Written by Ken Siu-Chong, Jim Zubkavich and Chris Sarracini, and illustrated by Joe Ng, Jeffrey 'Chamba' Cruz and Takeshi Miyazawa.

==== Plot ====
===== Volume One =====
Taking place four years after the Street Fighter tournament, Guile has been investigating a centuries-old secret organization known as “The Society”. After losing his inside agent, Tom, Guile finds out the Society has taken an interest in Ryu and travels to Japan to talk with him. When he and Officer Gibson arrive at Gouken's dojo, they are attacked by Sakura, who has succumbed to the Satsui no Hado. Before leaving, she tells them that Ryu is missing and vows to bring him back herself.

At the hospital, Guile calls Ken, who recommends contacting E. Honda or Dan to find out what happened to Sakura and Ryu. He is then confronted by Alex, a New York wrestler who was raised and trained by one of Guile's comrades named Tom after his parents died. Guile informs Alex that Tom agreed to go undercover in the Society after his last mission investigating them led to the deaths of his teammates.

Guile agrees to let Alex join him on the case and the two travel to E. Honda's sumo school, where they end up meeting Dan (who is now working as a chef since his dojo is failing). Dan informs them that after Sakura graduated high school, Ryu agreed to train her as his official protégé. One day at the dojo, they are suddenly attacked by a seemingly alive M. Bison and one of the top disciples of the Society, Urien. Urien is able to defeat and abduct Ryu when the latter gets distracted by Sakura losing to Bison. Blaming herself for Ryu's capture, Sakura considers utilizing the Dark Hado to save him before she is confronted by Akuma.

===== Volume Two =====
Akuma battles Sakura to tempt her to give in to the Satsui no Hado in hopes that it will lead to Ryu to do the same. As the Society attempts to transport a frozen Ryu onto a barge, Guile, Alex, and Dan ambush Bison, Juri, and Urien. Sakura appears and nearly beats Bison to death before Ryu breaks free from the ice and tries to stop her. As Guile prepares to apprehend Bison, Juri attempts to murder the Shadaloo leader to avenge her parents. However, Bison is revealed to actually be the Society's shapeshifting humanoid weapon named Twelve and escapes.

Ryu absorbs the Dark Hado from Sakura to free her from the Satsui no Hado's influence, giving Akuma the chance to force him to succumb to his dark side and transform into Evil Ryu. Akuma then transforms into Oni to fight Ryu at his maximum potential. With the two fighters displaying massive power, they attract the attention of the Society's leader, Gill, who proves powerful enough to defeat both Evil Ryu and Oni and revert them to their base forms. Alex attacks Gill to question him on Tom's whereabouts, but Gill easily knocks him out while telling him he has an important role to play in the future.

Guile and Alex report the events to Officer Gibson, who tells them Shadaloo and the Society are working together and that their best leads are Shadaloo's remaining leaders, Balrog and Vega. Sakura thanks Ryu and Dan for saving her from the Dark Hado as they continue to press onwards with their individual journeys.

In the epilogue, Cammy and her new team, Delta Blue, are assigned to rescue a key member from the British Prime Minister's cabinet from the Arctic Circle. While infiltrating the facility, Cammy is forced to fight Necro, a mutant created by the Society. After defeating him, Cammy and her team find out that the Society had cloned the cabinet minister as well as several influential and powerful political figures. Gill takes this opportunity to make the Society's intentions known to the world, and has a clone they made of the Secretary of State speak to the President.

=== Street Fighter Origins (2013, 2023) ===
Street Fighter Origins: Akuma is a graphic novel originally released in a hardcover edition in September 2013. It follows Akuma and Gouken's early history before Akuma was consumed by the Satsui no Hadou. A preview of this comic was released in Street Fighter #0 Free Comic Book Day comic book, titled "Beyond the Hills". Written by Chris Sarracini and illustrated by Joe Ng.

Other Street Fighter Origins graphic novels are planned for the future. A new four-issue mini-series Street Fighter Origins: Sagat was scheduled to start publishing in 2018, but was later delayed to 2023, when it was published as a graphic novel.

==== Akuma ====
Decades ago in rural Japan, Akuma and his older brother Gouken were raised by their father Yoshinori and worked as rice farmers. One night, Yoshinori is confronted by a group of assassins. The leader of the group reveals that Yoshinori was previously known as Gyūki and that he was a first generation disciple of Goutetsu, who mastered the Ansatsuken fighting style. The leader's father and Gyūki became assassins after they were dismissed by Goutetsu for secretly training to harness the Dark Hado. Eventually Gyūki condemned the Dark Hado and killed his fellow assassins and the leader's father before changing his name and starting a family. As their father is beaten to death by the killers, Akuma, Gouken, and their mother flee their home.

Months later, Akuma and Gouken have taken refuge in a cave in the mountains. Their mother is traumatized by Gyūki's death and has lost the will to live. Akuma views his parents as weak and wants to grow strong enough to face his father's killer while Gouken believes they should remain hidden and only focus taking care of themselves. While training in the wilderness, Akuma is mauled by a bear and rescued by his father's master, Goutetsu, who agrees to train him in Ansatsuken. Five years later, Goutetsu's dojo is visited by a Tokyo fight promoter, who offers Akuma the opportunity to come fight for him. Akuma refuses to go with the promoter, but decides to leave the dojo to learn more about the outside world. Right after Akuma leaves, Gouken arrives at the dojo and asks Goutetsu to train him, as he realized he could not rely solely on himself after his mother's death.

After spending years in Tokyo and learning more about the value of power, Akuma returns to the dojo to complete his training to become the ultimate fighter. Goutetsu sends Akuma to the mountains with the rest of his students to seek enlightenment by meditating for days without food or provisions. Akuma and Gouken are the only students who succeed. For their final test, Goutetsu's assistant, Retsu, reveals to them that the men who killed their father reside in a village below the mountains. Gouken refuses to harm them, as he believes he should use his training to protect others. Akuma, however, mercilessly punishes them and burns down the village. Before he dies, the leader reveals he knew where to find Akuma's family because Goutetsu gave him the same test. Blaming Goutetsu for his father's demise, Akuma challenges his master in a fight to the death at the dojo. Despite Goutetsu's attempts to convince him to abandon the Dark Hado, Akuma embraces it and murders his master.

Ten years later, Gouken has raised the sole survivor of the village Akuma burned down as his adoptive son and named him Ryu. He and Retsu live in a dojo in the wilderness and train Ryu in Ansatsuken. After traveling for three months in Japan, Retsu informs Gouken that Akuma resides in a home built on the steepest peaks outside the Eastern falls waiting for a worthy opponent to face him. Gouken tries to convince his brother to return home, but Akuma refuses and goads Gouken into fighting him. Akuma loses the fight and falls down the cliff after refusing his brother's help, preferring to walk his own path alone.

==== Sagat ====
Taking place a few years prior to the comic, Sagat was originally part of the Tiger Monks, a group of Muay Thai fighters descended from warriors chosen by King Naresuan. With Thailand in the midst of a civil war, the elder of the monks, Chongrak, proclaimed the powerful fighter Nuakan to be the fourth god of Muay Thai in an attempt to unite the people, leading Sagat to leave the group as he recognized Nuakan's unethical nature. When Nuakan became too power hungry and slaughtered dozens, Chongrak lead a group of monks to assassinate him, but they were all easily defeated and killed. Sagat, who has been protecting a village near the Thailand-Burma border, is encouraged by one of the farmers and the deaths of his fellow monks to take a stand against Nuakan.

King Bhumibol Adulyadej arranges the first Street Fighter tournament in an attempt to unify the country and prove that Muay Thai is the ultimate fighting style, offering to give immunity for Nuakan's crimes if he participates and wins. After Gen kills his student Sheng Long for impersonating him to join the tournament, Sagat takes his place and eventually makes it to the finals to face off against Nuakan. When he emerges victorious, Nuakan is arrested and the people of Thailand declare Sagat to be the new god of Muay Thai and use him as a symbol of hope when protesting against the corrupt Prime Minister, Pranam, for the next four years. Pranam has Sagat arrested when he refuses to side with the government and denounce the protests.

Sagat is placed in the "Black Tomb", a prison with hundreds of farmers and protesters contained from Pranam's forces. Pranam controls the prison's population by allowing Nuakan to kill several prisoners. Nine months into his containment, he is introduced to Bison, who was captured for supplying guns to the rebels. Bison convinces Sagat that the only way to stop those in power is to abandon his principles and take what is his by force. Sagat kills Nuakan in a brutal showdown, and Bison uses his victory to convince the prisoners to rise up against their captors, resulting in a jailbreak. After they escape, Sagat agrees to join Shadaloo to overthrow Pranam's regime from the shadows.

Three years later, Pranam is assassinated by the rebels. With his death creating a power vacuum for potential military radicals, King Bhumibol decides to initiate another Street Fighter tournament to fortify the nation, offering Sagat a clean slate from his crimes in Shadaloo if he participates. Sagat agrees to proudly represent his people and tells Adon he plans to find himself again after he wins the tournament. He progresses to the championship, where he has his fateful match against Ryu.

=== Street Fighter Unlimited (2015–2016) ===
Spanning regular issues #1 through #12, the series started publishing in December 2015, and includes four-page backup stories at the end of every issue. Written by Ken Siu-Chong, and illustrated by Edwin Huang, Joe Ng, Julian Choy and Gonzalo Ordoñez. Compiled in the 2017 hardcover editions Street Fighter Unlimited Volume 1: The New Journey (issues 1-4), Street Fighter Unlimited Volume 2: Gathering (issues 5-8), and Street Fighter Unlimited Volume 3: The Balance (issues 9-12).

An issue #0 was published on Free Comic Book Day in 2014, composed of two short stories that were previously published in Super Street Fighter Volume Two, and a preview of issue #1.

Another special issue Annual #1 was published in 2016, containing four short stories that originally appeared as bonus stories in various hardcover graphic novel collections. Thus these stories take place before the Street Fighter Unlimited series.

==== Plot ====
===== Issues #1–4 =====
After his battle with Gill and Oni, Ryu still struggles to contain the Satsui no Hado within him. He attempts to find answers in a bout with Sagat, who questions if the Dark Hado is part of Ryu's true nature and that he just hasn't admitted it yet. When Ryu misses Gouken's guidance, Ken suggests seeking out Gouken's longtime friend, Retsu. Retsu takes him to a cave and reveals that Gouken is truly alive. Gouken informs Ryu that he managed to survive Akuma's Shun Goku Satsu by using the Power of Nothingness to remove his spirit from his body. Retsu eventually found Gouken's drifting spirit and was able to temporarily materialize Gouken into a physical form. Gouken then trains Ryu in the final techniques of Ansatsuken. While Gouken doesn't agree with Ryu wanting to find a way to use the Satsui no Hado against Akuma, he respects his student's decision and recommends seeking out a new master named Oro.

Guile and Cammy continue to investigate the Society on their own as some of their superiors secretly work for the Society and are unable to reach Chun-Li, who has been captured by Vega. With Ken's help, they interrogate Balrog and find out that Vega took over S.I.N. and Shadaloo's technological assets. The two then travel to Spain with Alex to rescue Chun-Li, but are attacked by Vega's army of Twelve clones. They are unable to deal with the regenerative property of the clones, but they survive thanks to Alex, who is somehow able to disintegrate the clones whenever he touches them.

Gill begins slowly earning the trust of the people and convincing them of the Society's goals to make the world a better place by demonstrating his power. He destroys a meteor that was heading for Earth and has one of his moles in the White House launch a nuke at Russia that he is also able to stop.

===== Issues #5–8 =====
Gill uses his connections, clones of famous figures, and platforms to continue spreading the Society's message of peace and technological advancements to gain widespread approval from the world. He also announces that the Society will host the Tournament of Brotherhood and invites all fighters around the world to compete.

Ryu travels to Brazil to meet Oro, who agrees to train him. Oro attempts to teach Ryu how to master both the positive and negative aspects of his ki so he can utilize the Satsui no Hado without giving into the darkness. When Ryu is invited to Gill's tournament, Oro suspends his training and instructs him to defeat Gill, as doing so could help him gain the power needed to defeat Akuma.

The fighters arrive at the tournament, where Alex discovers that Tom has been alive and well under the Society's hospitality. Tom still holds grudges towards the Society, but has gotten to understand their perspective better. After Alex tells Tom what Gill said about his future, Tom takes him to an art gallery and shows him an ancient painting of a man that bears a strong resemblance to him.

===== Issues #9–12 =====
As the tournament proceeds, Gill's subordinates keep an eye on the ki and power levels of the fighters. Urien, not wanting to be in a world ruled by Gill, seeks out Alex's help. He reveals that he, Alex, and Gill are descended from Secret Society members who were said to have genetic markers that signified their descendants could become the Society's Savior. However, Alex's ancestor was banished for rebelling against the Society. Urien found out that Alex was one of the descendants when he was able to activate the failsafe on the Twelves. He then reveals Gill's ultimate plan is to use Seth's Blece device on Ryu and bring a new world order by using it to kill anyone deemed unworthy of being brought into the new age. Alex agrees to help Urien.

During one of Ryu's fights in the tournament, Gill has Twelve turn into Akuma to get Ryu to succumb to the Satsui no Hado. He defeats Evil Ryu and begins to use him to power up the Blece device. Urien knocks out Gill's assistant Kolin and gives the crown that controls the Blece device to Alex, who redirects the energy to destroy Gill's body. After his destruction, Gill's soul is able to take control of Alex's body and banishes Urien from the Society before challenging the rest of the fighters.

As the fighters struggle against Gill's powers, Ryu manages to achieve harmony within himself by accepting both the positive and negative aspects of his ki. Now known as Shin Ryu, his balanced ki allows him to surpass Gill's power and weaken him. Because of this, Alex is able to expel Gill's soul from his body before Ryu finishes off the Society's leader with the Shun Goku Satsu. Gill's soul awakens in the realm of Makai, where he meets the demon Jedah Dohma. Ryu then teleports to Australia to challenge Akuma in his Oni form. Thanks to his new powers as Shin Ryu and his training from Gouken and Oro, Ryu is finally able to defeat Akuma, leaving the latter devastated. He then returns to Brazil to master his new powers by continuing his training with Oro.

Two months later, Kolin and the remaining Society members begin making plans to regain their strength. Kolin refuses to accept that Gill is dead and now has a resurrected Charlie Nash working for her. Alex tries to become a professional wrestler and is recruited by mayor Mike Haggar to help him deal with the Mad Gear Gang in Metro City.

=== Street Fighter Legends: Cammy (2016) ===
Street Fighter Legends: Cammy (original edition 2016, hardcover 2017) - A four-issue mini-series that follows Cammy and her Delta Blue team during the events of the Street Fighter Unlimited series. Written by Jim Zubkavich and illustrated by Omar Dogan.

==== Plot ====
Cammy leads a Delta Blue team consisting of George Genzu, Abel, and former Dolls Juli and Juni. However, her superior put the team on hold after Juni suddenly blanks out during a mission. During the team's night out on the town, Juni reverts to her Doll programming and escapes the restaurant to head to a rendezvous point. Cammy catches up and finds Juni and Decapre teaming up to fight Juri and Crimson Viper. Juni runs away from the fight with Juri tailing her while Cammy and her team arrest Viper and Decapre before taking them to MI-6 headquarters. Viper is quickly released thanks to her connections with the U.S. government and refuses to work with Delta Blue, not trusting them after what happened to Juni. Juri tracks down Juni to an aircraft hangar on the Isle of Dogs. As she reports her findings to Viper, she is knocked out and captured by F.A.N.G.

Genzu and an MI-6 scientist discover a node within the brains of the dolls that is emitting a retrieval signal. Cammy and Juli aren't as affected as Decapre and Juni since they weren't as deeply indoctrinated into Shadaloo, but know they are at risk. Genzu attempts to link Cammy's mind to Decapre's so they can track the retrieval signal and Juni. The process goes haywire and puts Cammy back under Bison's control, leading her and Decapre to escape to the rendezvous point. Delta Blue tracks both of them to the hangar, where Abel is knocked out and captured by F.A.N.G. and Juni. Cammy breaks free from Bison's control, prompting F.A.N.G. to retreat. Viper arrives to help Delta Blue deal with the rest of the Shadaloo henchmen just as F.A.N.G.’s plane flies off.

Cammy informs them that F.A.N.G. is flying to a secret Shadaloo lab in Xinjiang to use his prisoners to resurrect Bison, as Abel and the Dolls can provide the genetic reconstruction data while Juri can power it with her Feng Shui Engine. Cammy's team arrives too late as F.A.N.G.’s experiment successfully brings Bison back to life. While Bison's resurrection devoids him of his control over the other Dolls, Decapre chooses to willingly serve him as all she's ever wanted was to destroy Cammy and take her place. As the base falls apart, Bison, F.A.N.G. and Decapre escape with the rest of Shadaloo while Delta Blue, Viper, and Juri use the maintenance tunnels to leave the mountain safely. Despite Bison's resurrection, Cammy considers the mission a success as he no longer has control over her and her teammates. She vows to eventually free Decapre and destroy Shadaloo for good.

=== Street Fighter vs. Darkstalkers (2017–2018) ===
Spans issues #0 through #8. The Darkstalkers series crossover limited series titled Street Fighter vs. Darkstalkers started publishing on February 22, 2017 and ended on January 31, 2018. Written by Matt Moylan and illustrated by Hanzo Steinbach.

==== Plot ====
With Gill's help, Jedah reclaims his castle from Ozom and uses his former assistant's skull as the base for his new realm, the Majigen. He plans to use the Majigen to make the Fetus of God, which would devour all universes and realities and unite them into a single universal soul. Since the Majigen is fueled by chaos and conflict, Jedah has Lilith, the second half of Morrigan Aensland's soul, kidnap several Street Fighters and Darkstalkers to pit them against each other in the Majigen. He forces Gill to be the conduit for the positive and negative ki from the conflict, allowing him to create and power the Fetus of God.

Chun-Li awakens in a forest in the Majigen, where she is attacked by large insect monsters before receiving assistance from Ken and Sagat to fend them off. They then get into a fight with Jon Talbain and Felicia before realizing they all came from the human realm and were put there by Lilith. The five then begin to head towards a mountain after Chun-Li heard a voice encouraging them to go there, which she later believes to be Gen. The group is then attacked by Lord Raptor and his zombies. Raptor uses his powers to transform Ken into a rage-fueled warrior under his control named Violent Ken after the latter gets infected by one of his zombies. The fighters are saved by Victor von Gerdenheim and Elena, who uses her healing powers to turn Lord Raptor into a human and Ken back to normal.

Once they make it to the mountain, Bishamon appears and battles them with his army of souls. In the midst of the fight, Chun-Li is called into a nearby forest by Gen, whose soul has wandered restlessly in the Majigen for the sins he committed during his life. To help Chun-Li and her allies escape from the realm, Gen teaches her the forbidden technique known as the Killing Intent. Thanks to her new training, Chun-Li finds the weakest point in the universe and creates an exit out of the Majigen while Victor stays behind to hold off Bishamon and his minions.

Despite becoming the new ruler of Makai after her father's death, Morrigan doesn't take her new responsibilities seriously and continues to venture into the human world. While battling Necalli in Brazil, she meets Lilith, who was helping Jedah in hopes that he would make her become whole again with Morrigan. After learning of Jedah's plans, Morrigan promises to accept Lilith's soul if she joins her to stop him. The two travel to Tibet to recruit Donavan Baine and Anita since they possess the Dhylec, the only weapon that can kill Jedah. Since not all of them have the ability to travel to Makai, they reach out to Akuma as the Satsui no Hado allows him to create a portal to the demon realm.

Chun-Li's and Morrigan's teams end up in the Makai at the same time, where Jedah manipulates them into fighting each other. They stop after realizing their battle is being used to fuel the Fetus of God and team up to defeat Jedah. As he orders the Fetus to consume the souls of his enemies, Gill rips out his heart and Akuma kills him with the Dhylec. Gill intends to use the Fetus to attempt to conquer the world again, but he is brought back to life by Kolin and the Society and loses his powers in the human realm. Morrigan fuses with Lilith and their combined power allows them to trap the Fetus of God in the Majigen. The Street Fighters and Darkstalkers who were trapped there are sent back to their respective realms. Akuma chooses to remain in Makai so he can increase the strength of his Dark Hado.

Most of the Street Fighters and Darkstalkers return to their normal lives. Elena uses her healing powers to help Victor save his companion, Emily. Chun-Li visits Felicia in Kansas and finds that she and Jon are now taking care of the children in the orphanage she grew up in. Morrigan is crowned Queen of Makai and starts taking her role more seriously with Lilith by her side. Ken goes to Brazil to seek Ryu's guidance in helping him control his new inner darkness that turns him into Violent Ken.

=== Street Fighter 6 (2023) ===
Spans issues #0 through #4, published from May 2023 to June 2023. Issue #0 was published on Free Comic Book Day in 2023. The hardcover collection of the series also included the Street Fighter 6 Evolution Special published in November 2023.

The series serves as a prequel to the game of the same name. Unlike other Street Fighter Udon titles, it is canon to the games. It chronicles how Ken was tricked by JP into funding his criminal activities and was framed for a conspiracy in Nayshall, leading to him going into hiding to protect his family.

== Specials ==
=== One-shot stories ===
- Street Fighter: Deep Scars (2003) - A four-page comic created exclusively for GamePro magazine's October 2003 issue. It expands upon the battle between Ryu and Sagat, from which Sagat received his large scar over his chest. This comic was later released in the digital version of "Street Fighter Remix" and had its title renamed to "Shadow Boxing".
- Capcom Summer Special 2004 (2004) - Originally made exclusively for the 2004 Convention UDON Convention Tour. Contains three short stories: Street Fighter (Chun-Li story), Darkstalkers (Morrigan origin story) and Rival Schools (Sakura, Hinata and Natsu story).
- Street Fighter II Chun-Li Mini Comic (2006) - A Chun-Li mini-comic that came with the 2006 re-release of Street Fighter II: The Animated Movie (Uncut, Uncensored, Unleashed).
- Street Fighter Remix (September 2008) - Contains prequel stories for Street Fighter II Turbo, Street Fighter Legends: Chun-Li, Street Fighter III. Even though a Street Fighter III series was not released, this was later considered a prequel story for Super Street Fighter Vol.1 that was published in 2013. Written by Ken Siu-Chong, and illustrated by Joe Ng and Omar Dogan.
- Street Fighter Remix Digital Edition (2013) - Has one new story, removed Chun-Li's prequel story, and gave titles to each of the short stories. It contains a new Cammy story called "The Rhythm of Battle", "Shadow Boxing" (previously called "Deep Scars"), Street Fighter II Turbo prequel story "Fierce Competition", Super Street Fighter Volume One: New Generation prequel story "A Whole New Generation" (previously considered prequel for Street Fighter III series which became Super Street Fighter Volume One: New Generation).
- Street Fighter IV (2009) - A one-shot comic that showcases fighters facing off against their classic counterparts. It was originally only available when the Street Fighter IV game was purchased at Target stores in the United States. It was later available for digital purchase. Written by Matt Moylan and illustrated by Joe Vriens.
- Street Fighter Super Combo Special! (Free Comic Book Day 2015) - A one-shot Street Fighter issue was published on Free Comic Book Day in May 2015. It features Ryu, Charlie, Guile, Viper, Ibuki, Ken. Written by Matt Moylan, and illustrated by Jeffrey 'Chamba' Cruz, Omar Dogan, Dax Gordine, Long Vo, Joe Vriens and Joe Ng.
- Street Fighter V: The Life and Death(s) of Charlie Nash (2015) - UDON's first Street Fighter V-related comic, exclusive for the 2015 San Diego Comic-Con. The comic focuses on Charlie Nash and the past stories which cover both his background, including his previous military work and encounters with Guile, and every instance of him "dying" up to and including Street Fighter Alpha 3. It also cover the details behind his "revival" leading up to his appearance in Street Fighter V, as well as Charlie's Shadow persona. Written by Chris Sarracini, and illustrated by Jeffrey 'Chamba' Cruz, Dax Gordine, Edwin Huang, Robert 'Robaato' Porter, Hanzo Steinbach and Long Vo.
- Street Fighter V (Free Comic Book Day 2016) - A one-shot Street Fighter issue published on Free Comic Book Day in May 2016. Written by Ken Siu-Chong and Matt Moylan, and illustrated by Brendon Tapper, Edwin Huang and Jeffrey 'Chamba' Cruz.
- Street Fighter V: Wrestling Special (Free Comic Book Day 2017) - Contains two short stories, Ladies Man and Cold War Carnage.
- Street Fighter Shadaloo Special (2017) - A compilation of four new stories from hardcover editions about Balrog and Vega, Juri and Crimson Viper, Cammy, and F.A.N.G. Written by Ken Siu-Chong, and illustrated by Omar Dogan and Hanzo Steinbach.
- Ultra Street Fighter II (Free Comic Book Day 2018). A one-shot comic that focuses on Ryu's attempts to help Ken control his Violent Ken persona after the events of Street Fighter vs. Darkstalkers. Written by Ken Siu-Chong and illustrated by Hanzo Steinbach.
- Street Fighter: Menat (March 2019) - First entry in a new series of character specials, this one being about Menat. Written by Ken Siu-Chong and illustrated by Hanzo Steinbach.
- Street Fighter: Wrestlepalooza (April 2019) - Alex and Mike Haggar fight against the Mad Gear gang. Written by Ken Siu-Chong and illustrated by 'Panzer'.
- Street Fighter: Sakura vs. Karin (Free Comic Book Day 2019) - A Sakura and Karin special where they compete over a puzzle game. Written by Ken Siu-Chong and illustrated by Omar Dugan.
- Street Fighter: Necro & Effie (June 2019) - While enjoying their newfound freedom, Necro and Effie find themselves in the crossfire between Urien and Kolin, as Effie's blood is the key to reactivating Gill's powers.
- Street Fighter: Akuma vs. Hell (July 2019) - A one-shot comic where Akuma attempts to grow stronger by battling the monsters of Makai before facing off against Gen, who tries to convince him to change his ways after suffering in the afterlife.
- Street Fighter #100: Ryu versus Chun-Li (Free Comic Book Day 2020) (May 2020) - A one-shot comic where Chun-Li battles Ryu after he suddenly attacks Guile at Ken and Eliza's 10th anniversary party.
- Street Fighter: Back To School Special (Free Comic Book Day 2021) (August 2021) - Sakura, Karin, and Ibuki battle Akira Kazama, Yurika Kirishima, and Zaki to promote their respective universities to Makoto and Elena at a college fair.
- Street Fighter Masters: Blanka (Free Comic Book Day 2022) (May 2022) - Blanka reflects on his upbringing as he defends the Amazon rainforest from lumberjacks.
- Street Fighter Masters: Chun-Li (September 2022) - After learning of Bison's resurrection from Cammy, Chun-Li leaves her students to pursue Ed and Falke for intel before realizing how much she's letting her vengeance consume her.
- Street Fighter Masters: Cammy (April 2023) - While participating in a modeling show in London to take down a potential assassin, Cammy is forced to battle a berserk Seth accidentally unleashed by Juri.
- Street Fighter Omega (November 2023)
- Street Fighter 6 Evolution Special (November 2023) A.K.I. attempts to take down Rashid to appease F.A.N.G. Cammy and Dee Jay fake a sparring match at an award show to draw out a jealous assassin. Luke and Jamie compete to determine Metro City's true protector.
- Street Fighter Masters: Kimberly (December 2023) While protesting against Belger, Kimberly gets the chance to meet and fight alongside her idol, Guy, and his master, Zeku.
- Street Fighter Masters: Akuma VS Ryu (March 2024) - After acquiring new power in Makai, Akuma has his long-awaited rematch with Ryu. Following the fight, Ryu begins his new journey to learn the Power of Nothingness.
- Street Fighter vs Final Fight (Free Comic Book Day 2024) (May 2024) An issue chronicling Cody's journey from ruthless vigilante, to melancholic jailbird, to the reformed Mayor of Metro City.
- Street Fighter Masters: Game Gals (June 2024)
- Street Fighter Masters: Lily (October 2024)
- Street Fighter vs. Rival Schools (Free Comic Book Day 2025) (May 2025) Gedo High students Edge and Gan recruit Blanka into their ranks to take on Batsu and his friends, as well as students from other rivaling schools.

=== Art books ===
- Street Fighter Tribute
- Street Fighter 2016 Swimsuit Special
- Street Fighter & Friends 2017 Swimsuit Special
- Street Fighter 2018 Summer Sports Special
- Street Fighter 2019 Pin-Up Special
- Street Fighter Swimsuit Special Collection 2020
- Street Fighter 2020 Swimsuit Special
- Street Fighter 2021 Sci-Fi & Fantasy Special
- Street Fighter 2022 Swimsuit Special

== See also ==
- UDON's Darkstalkers comics
