= Oro (Street Fighter) =

Playable Street Fighter character

- Street Fighter character
- Oro in Street Fighter III: 3rd Strike
- First appearance: Street Fighter III (1997)
- Created by: Tomoshi Sadamoto
- Designed by: Yūji Imamura
- Voiced by: English: Dave Fennoy (SFV); Japanese: Kan Tokumaru; Takashi Matsuyama (3rd Strike, SFV)

In-universe information
- Fighting style: Senjutsu
- Origin: Japan
- Nationality: Japanese

Oro (Japanese: オロ) is a fictional character in the Street Fighter series of fighting games by Capcom. Oro is an ancient martial arts master who lives a secluded life of an immortal hermit, first appearing in Street Fighter III. Oro received mixed reception, with commentary focused on his unusual and controversial character design.

== Conception and development ==
During the development of Street Fighter III: New Generation, the character that became Oro was originally planned to be a Brazilian Jiu Jitsu fighter, inspired by the Gracie family. As development progressed, they looked over previously suggested designs. Of these designs, Oro's stood out to the sprite art team pushing, who wanted to see the character in motion. The design was overseen by Yūji Imamura, who had previously worked as a graphics designer on Capcom's Darkstalkers series.

Producer Tomoshi Sadamoto was unsure of how well Oro alongside fellow character Necro would go over with audiences so he helped oversee the characters' development directly, stating in an interview he formed an attachment to them along the way. The North American branch of Capcom however reacted more negatively upon seeing the new characters, with developer Chris Tang stating his reaction to Oro was to wonder if something terrible had happened, more specifically if everyone behind the development of Street Fighter II had been fired.

=== Design ===
Standing 161 centimetres (5 ft 3 1/2 in), Oro is a wrinkled old man with solid red eyes and yellow skin. His head is bald with a few strands of long hair extending from his scalp, while he is missing most of his teeth. His outfit consists of a dark red sash around his body tied up around his left shoulder, held behind his back. One of his arms is held behind his back when he fights as a form of self-handicapping. Oro is naked beneath his robes, which causes some of his animations in Street Fighter III to briefly expose his genitals. Oro's character portraits were designed to make him look more intimidating than his in-game sprites. At one point in development he was also intended to have a scar on his back.

When Oro was brought back for Street Fighter V, a prequel to the Street Fighter III games, the development team had some difficulty as they felt the character was so well represented in the original 2D sprite art. While several ideas were considered on how to portray him restraining one arm, they chose to have him holding a turtle with that arm instead during the fight, feeling it would present an interesting look when in motion. His outfit was left unchanged due to his role as a hermit, with the exception of an added loincloth.

== Appearances ==
Oro appears in Street Fighter III and its subsequent iterations, Street Fighter III: 2nd Impact and Street Fighter III: 3rd Strike, noted for his unorthodox fighting style. In his ending in New Generation and 2nd Impact, Oro decides that the only martial artist he met worthy of inheriting his secrets was Ryu. In 3rd Strike, Oro's boredom has reached its limits. Many young fighters have come to him in trying to become his disciples, but no one has lasted his training long enough. One day, he heard rumors involving a "mysterious organization" and the "master of the fist" and he decided to investigate. In his ending, Oro is shown trying to make Ryu, who is unaware of Oro's presence in his training, his disciple again.

Oro later reappears in Street Fighter V during Dhalsim's character story as Dhalsim encounters him while teaching a police officer named Mahesh how to breathe fire. Oro engages a discussion with the yoga master about mastering one skill before he leaves sensing another interesting person in the area. He was later mentioned in Karin's character story as Karin travels to India to find Oro, but is told by Dhalsim that he had already left a few days prior. He is also seen in Menat's character story when Menat, sent by her master Rose, warns him of an evil power in their world, which Oro is already aware of. He was made a playable character in the game's fifth season, in which he confers with Rose and Dhalsim about this lingering Psycho Power left behind after M. Bison's defeat. He once again fights using only one arm, carrying a tortoise named Yamasen in the other.

Outside of the video game series, Oro also appears in the Street Fighter Legends: Ibuki comic book miniseries where Ibuki's final ninja exam is to challenge him. Together with her friends Elena and Makoto, she goes to the shrine on Mount Atago, where Oro has travelled to meditate. After the fight, Oro says that she actually made him think about using both hands and commends her on an entertaining challenge.

== Promotion and reception ==
To promote the release of New Generation, several items of merchandise were created featuring Oro such as phone cards. Meanwhile, for 3rd Strike's Online Edition, player avatar items of the character were released for Sony's PlayStation Network. For Street Fighter 6, costume items based on Oro's appearance for the game's "World Tour" mode were added for players to use on their custom characters.

Oro was met with mixed reception, with reviewers of the game feeling his design did not fit the series' aesthetic. IGN's Rus McLaughlin cited Oro as an example of the new generation of Street Fighter games that featured "genetic mutants and oddballs", as he "didn't come close to normal" and helped contribute to returning players finding it difficult to find analogues to Street Fighter II's. On the other hand, Suriel Vazquez and Eric Van Allen of Paste described him as one of the strangest character designs in Street Fighter, even more so in light of how Street Fighter III had defined itself with unusual characters. They added that part of the character's appeal was that nobody could really figure out his fighting style, and appreciated how he handicapped himself when fighting.

Retronauts on their podcast discussing Street Fighter III expressed that upon seeing Oro none of them knew what to make of the character, with some expressing they were creeped out by his alien appearance. They felt he was not a popular character with Japanese audiences either, as he not only had an odd playstyle, but his character design had notable negative traits, namely in that some of his animations appeared to expose his genitals. While they appreciated the presentation of some of his attacks, overall they felt he fit the old hermit archetype too much, comparing him to Master Roshi of the Dragonball franchise in this regard.

Gavin Jasper of Den of Geek compared him to Yoda of the Star Wars franchise, in that both characters were portrayed as eccentric old hermits who could also be wise mentors with great strength. He appreciated that unlike similar characters Gouken and Gen in the franchise he was not tied down to an equally strong rival, and also described his gimmick of having to restrain his full power to be playable as something that made him "so rad". Gavin further enjoyed that in the context of traditional Street Fighter characters the strongest one was not a villain but instead a kindly old man, noting that while between Oro and Akuma it was difficult to ascertain which character was stronger, but in the context of Ryu while Akuma felt like an obstacle he would eventually overcome, Oro served as his final obstacle to enlightenment.

The symbolism of Oro's fighting stages and implications on Brazilian culture have also been discussed. In the journal Tecendo Sentidos published by the University of São Paulo, contributing author André de Oliveira Matumoto argued that Oro's stage in New Generation taking place in the caves of the Amazon in comparison to how fellow young potential fighter Brazilian character Sean's takes place in New York City presented a negative image of the country. In his view, this contrast presented America as a place where Sean could pursue his dreams fully, while the exoticized Brazil was presented as a suitable home for hermits, one that was "inside" and hides from the world. In contrast, he felt this aspect diminished as the series progressed, with both characters now located in Brazil but illustrating different aspects of who they are as fighters: the sun rising on Sean's stage to represent his role as a pupil, while setting on Oro's to represent his search for an apprentice.
