= Urien (disambiguation) =

Urien was a historical and legendary king in early medieval Britain.

Urien may also refer to:

- Urien (Street Fighter), character from Street Fighter III.
- Urien of Gwynedd, character in the novels of Katherine Kurtz.
- Brother Urien, character in The Cadfael Chronicles mystery novels, particularly in An Excellent Mystery.
