= Ibuki (Street Fighter) =

Character in Capcom's Street Fighter series

- Street Fighter character
- Ibuki in Onimusha: Soul
- First game: Street Fighter III (1997)
- Created by: Akira "Akiman" Yasuda
- Designed by: Akira "Akiman" Yasuda; Kinu Nishimura (schoolgirl outfit); Toshiyuki Kamei (SFV)
- Voiced by: English: Kat Steel (SSFIV, SFxT, SFV); Cristina Vee (SFV); Japanese: Yuri Amano; Ayumi Fujimura (SSFIV, SFxT, SFV); Kana Ueda (SFV)

In-universe information
- Fighting style: Taijutsu
- Origin: Japan
- Nationality: Japanese

Ibuki (いぶき, Ibuki) is a character in Capcom's Street Fighter series, first appearing in the 1997 fighting game Street Fighter III: New Generation.

== Conception and design ==
During the development of Street Fighter III: New Generation for Capcom, the development team had implemented legacy character Ryu into the game, and wanted to include a female character, but found a viable concept difficult to come up with. Akira "Akiman" Yasuda, a longtime character designer at Capcom then suggested "Let the girl be a ninja. Ninjas are absolutely cool!" Producer Tomoshi Sadamoto recalled that because they were located in Japan in contrast to other new characters Ibuki was much easier to find reference materials for. As koppojutsu as a martial art was getting attention at the time, Yasuda incorporated elements of it alongside ninjitsu into her character design and movements.

Her initial design was drastically different, consisting of a short haired muscular girl with glasses, wearing an outfit similar to Guy from Final Fight, another character he had developed. However they felt this design looked "more like a martial artist than a high-flying ninja". Another pass was done with a focus on a more traditional ninja, the next drawing giving her a full bodysuit and armor over her hands, ankles and crotch. Her appearance and outfit were refined further, giving her a look he described as cute "even though she looks shabby". Series artist and fellow character designer Kinu Nishimura took that statement to heart and emphasized that cute aspect of her art of Ibuki, as well as designing a school outfit for the character. She was given a long ponytail, which proved a problem for the animation team as it caused her to have "1.2 to 1.3x the character data" of other fighters, requiring several months to complete with Sadamoto himself helping at the end.

== Appearances ==
Ibuki is introduced in Street Fighter III: New Generation (1997) as a young ninja tasked by her clan with retrieving a document connected to Gill. She returns in the later Street Fighter III games, where her storyline emphasizes her wish to balance her ninja upbringing with an ordinary teenage life, including hopes of attending university and finding a boyfriend. She also appears in Street Fighter IV, set before Street Fighter III, with a similar character focus.

Ibuki later appears as a downloadable character in Street Fighter V. In that game, she appears in her own character story and in the cinematic story mode A Shadow Falls, where she works alongside characters including Karin and R. Mika against Shadaloo.

Outside the main series, a super-deformed version of Ibuki appears in Pocket Fighter (1997). She is also featured in crossover and spin-off titles including Street Fighter X Tekken, where she is partnered with Rolento, as well as mobile and card-based games such as Street Fighter: Puzzle Spirits, Onimusha Soul, Street Fighter Battle Combination, and the SNK vs. Capcom: Card Fighters' Clash series. She also has a cameo in Capcom Fighting Evolution (2004).

Beyond games, Ibuki appears in Street Fighter comic books, including Street Fighter: Unlimited. She also starred in the four-issue miniseries Street Fighter Legends: Ibuki, written by Jim Zubkavich and illustrated by Omar Dogan, published by UDON Entertainment in 2010 to coincide with Super Street Fighter IV.

== Promotion and reception ==
To promote the release of New Generation, several items of merchandise were created featuring Ibuki, including t-shirts, phone cards, and a wall clock. In 2010, an Xbox Live Avatar costume of Ibuki was released for the debut of Super Street Fighter IV, while a PlayStation Network avatar was released to support 3rd Strike's Online Edition. In 2015, a figure of her was released by Kotobukiya.

Ibuki was positively received since her debut, with Computer and Video Games magazine describing her as the most popular and powerful character of New Generation's cast. Martin Robinson of AskMen stated that while ninjas were a frequent trope in video games, "none are as effortlessly cool as Ibuki" and added that she was one of a handful of characters worth salvaging from Street Fighter III. Game developer Giovanni Simotti, designer of Akane the Kunoichi, based the character's appearance on both Ibuki and SNK's Mai Shiranui as a "small tribute to two of the most famous kunoichi from the history of the videogames". However, gaming publications saw Ibuki as a replacement for series character Chun-Li "albeit a little more punked out" according to Next Generation, and with Official UK PlayStation Magazine stating that this had caused the character to become despised in the first two Street Fighter III titles.

Jesse Schedeen of IGN argued that Ibuki strayed significantly from ninja tropes in gaming in that she was portrayed as "not a musclebound brute, but a young, quirky girl still finding her way in the world", and felt similar to fellow Street Fighter character Dan Hibiki in that manner. He described her "eclectic nature" as making her a fun character, enjoying that the game portrayed her as both a serious ninja in training but also someone able to relax and partake in social activities. Meanwhile, Gavin Jasper of Den of Geek praised her as "too fun not to like", noting her complex life specifically and giving additional praise to her role as the straight man to Rolento's eccentric behavior in Street Fighter X Tekken.

The staff of Paste also voiced praise for Ibuki, and added that her design in terms of aesthetics and as a fighter was strong and helped make her the best ninja of the series by far, despite their voiced disdain for her gameplay in Street Fighter IV. Retronauts on their podcast discussing Street Fighter III voiced similar sentiments, considering her one of the best designed characters in Street Fighter III overall for her gameplay, mobility and aesthetics, and felt she was a character they routinely gravitated to when playing the title. While they felt she was slightly over-engineered in terms of gamplay, they also felt a lot of love went into her character, and observed that very early on in New Generation's life she had developed a large fanbase.

In a retrospective of the Street Fighter series, Amanda LaPergola and Becky Chambers of The Mary Sue praised her status as a ninja, but criticized the emphasis of her story on her meeting boys. Their disdain came from seeing it as a perpetuation of the "normal girl" trope, something they felt was too common among younger female characters of the Street Fighter cast.

== See also ==
- Ninja in popular culture
