= Necro (Street Fighter) =

Playable Street Fighter character

- Street Fighter character
- Necro in Street Fighter III: 3rd Strike Online Edition
- First game: Street Fighter III (1997)
- Designed by: Akira "Akiman" Yasuda
- Voiced by: Michael X. Sommers; Lawrence Bayne (3rd Strike)

In-universe information
- Origin: Russia
- Nationality: Russian

Necro (Japanese: ネクロ, Hepburn: Nekuro) is a character from Capcom's Street Fighter fighting game series.

== Conception and development ==
During the development of Street Fighter III: New Generation for Capcom, Necro was designed by Akira "Akiman" Yasuda, who made a model out of paper clay for the sprite artist to reference. Due to Necro's unusual design, producer Tomoshi Sadamoto was unsure of how well Necro — alongside fellow character Oro — would go over with audiences, so he helped oversee their development directly, and formed an attachment to them along the way. Yasuda by comparison stated in a retrospective that while he liked Necro as a character, he felt they did not belong in a Street Fighter game, and cited him as an example of the problems with the game's character design.

A companion character, Necro's girlfriend Effie, was created early on in his development. The team felt that including such characters would help the cast have more depth, and provide hooks to the viewer to keep them interested in the game's story. Her character was intended to portray that even someone like Necro that was heavily modified and strange could live a normal, happy life, however the development team felt this instead acted as "a lid on a cracked pot". Effie was inspired by Yasuda, who was inspired by his own girlfriend at the time. After the initial design was rejected, they decided to make her "Roll-chan but from Blade Runner", in reference to Capcom's Mega Man character Roll.

=== Design ===
Standing 174 centimetres (5 ft 8 1/2 in) tall, Necro is a hunched over man with a muscular body and long arms. His body and eyes are entirely white, save for red sun markings on his shoulders. Additional red lines extend from the top of his head over his left eye, while another comes up from his lower jaw over his right eye. Necro is bald, while his nose is emphasized and extended. His outfit consists of purple rubber pants with a matching harness over his torso, with the knees emphasized while a codpiece covers his front. Similar bracers cover his lower arms, with a large circular piece at the wrist. A large metal brace surrounds his neck, held in place by large bolts. His tongue is pierced, something they wanted to emphasize.

By comparison, Effie stands 152 cm (5 ft) tall, and is a blonde woman with her hair stylized in twintails with bangs over her eyes. Black makeup circles her eyes, while large red bows hold her hair in place and a red spiked choker surrounds her neck. Her outfit consists of a red rubber dress with spikes and a belt clasp at the bottom, while similar gloves and boots cover her hands and feet respectively. Originally she was going to have a tail, but they chose instead to give her a spiked rubbed dress to make things simpler for the art team.

== Appearances ==
Necro is the codename for Illia, a young Russian man introduced in the 1997 Capcom fighting game Street Fighter III: New Generation. Originating from a lakeside village, after the fall of the Soviet Union he traveled to find fame and fortune. He was instead tricked by Gill's Illuminati into having his DNA altered, becoming a living bioweapon with an elastic body and built-in power generator. Now codenamed Necro, he was used as a tool by the Illuminati, though longs for his freedom. After he is betrayed and captured by Gill, he is rescued by his girlfriend Effie, and the two go on the run. Necro was originally voiced by Michael X. Sommers, with Lawrence Bayne taking over the role in Street Fighter III: 3rd Strike.

In other games, the SNK vs. Capcom: Card Fighters series also features him as an available card, as does GungHo Online Entertainment's mobile game TEPPEN. According to Street Fighter series director Takayuki Nakayama, Effie was considered for inclusion in Street Fighter V, but was rejected as she was considered "a very difficult character".

== Promotion and reception ==
To promote the release of New Generation, several items of merchandise were created featuring Necro such as phone cards. Meanwhile, for 3rd Strike's Online Edition, player avatar items of the character were released for Sony's PlayStation Network.

Since his debut, Necro was mostly well received. While he has been described as a combination of Street Fighter II characters Blanka and Dhalsim, Paul Furfari of UGO.com called him a welcome if difficult to play addition to the franchise. Suriel Vazquez and Eric Van Allen of Paste held a similar stance, calling him an interesting addition to Street Fighter III, and stated that while he had not received many appearances in the franchise since they were hopeful for a return appearance due to both his interesting backstory and fighting style. However, some outlets such as GamePro were more critical, feeling he belonged more in Capcom's Darkstalkers franchise.

Gavin Jasper of Den of Geek stated that Necro "seems like a 90's X-Men character who somehow wandered into the series". While he also made the comparison to Dhalsim and Blanka, he felt that Necro's animation style portrayed the attacks better, and moreso that he did more with their gimmicks particularly Dhalsim's where he felt Necro's gameplay was "crazier and more dynamic" than Dhalsim's "punch really far" technique. Praise was also given for how much personality Necro exuded, portrayed as a misfit with a grudge followed by "creepy" girl Effie, while also fleshing out Gill's story by illustrating no matter how righteous the Illuminati leader saw himself, he was a supervillain.

=== Analysis of gameplay and themes ===
From a gameplay standpoint, Shivam Bhatt for Retronauts stated that while Necro had "really trippy animation [and] looks very very cool", his attacks put him at a significant disadvantage in Street Fighter III due to the reliance on extending his limbs. Host Diamond Feit agreed, pointing out how it conflicted with the defensive nature of the game and the ability players had to parry attacks, with both of them agreeing that more often than not it would result in Necro players being easily hit in retaliation. While Bhatt acknowledged some of his attacks gave the character more mobility, Necro had the feel of a character made strictly to hold various attack ideas that were not designed to work together, which in turn helped sour the impression of the game.

Journalist John Learned in his YouTube series examining the characters of Street Fighter III cited Necro as the poster child for how many complained about the series shifting away from the more grounded Enter the Dragon nature of its predecessor to a science fiction aesthetic, and how that put off many players. However he also felt Necro was "a study in contrasts", presented as sinister looking with his design but his in game and relationship with Effie illustrated him as good nature while his story felt uplifting. Learned also saw him as a tragic character, thematically serving against his will as an angel for the Judeo-Christian themed Gill, while also being acting as the angel that rebels.

Learned further felt that Necro's white skin and red affectations made him look less ferocious and more akin to a clown. Elaborating he expressed that clowns were often meant to entertain, often through ridicule and torment to generate a reaction from the audience, something he felt was illustrated by Necro's inclination for performance by singing post-match. He drew a comparison in this sense to the clown character Canio from the Italian opera tragedy Pagliacci, in how both characters were ultimately manipulated and betrayed. Taking into consideration Necro's emphasized nose, further comparison was also drawn to the character Pinocchio in how both of them are puppets that long for freedom, while hoodwinked into doing bad things along the way.
