= Street Fighter III =

1997 video game

Street Fighter III: New Generation
- European arcade flyer
- Developer: Capcom
- Publishers: Arcade; Capcom; Dreamcast: JP/NA: Capcom; PAL: Virgin Interactive
- Producers: Tomoshi Sadamoto; Noritaka Funamizu (Note: General producer); Yoshiki Okamoto
- Designers: Yasuhiro Seto; Tomonori Ohmura; Shinichiro Obata
- Programmers: Kazuhito Nakai; Tate; Yas
- Artists: Ball Boy; Q Yu-suke; D Kurita
- Composers: Hideki Okugawa; Yuki Iwai
- Series: Street Fighter
- Platforms: Arcade, Dreamcast
- Release: Arcade: JP: February 28, 1997; EU: February 1997; NA: March 5, 1997; Dreamcast: JP: December 16, 1999; NA: June 20, 2000; EU: September 15, 2000
- Genre: Fighting
- Modes: Single-player, multiplayer
- Arcade system: CP System III

Street Fighter III: New Generation (Japanese: ストリートファイターIII -New Generation-) is a 1997 fighting game in Capcom's Street Fighter series, originally released as a coin-operated arcade game. The sequel to Street Fighter II (1991), it initially discarded every previous character except for Ryu and Ken (hence the New Generation subtitle), introducing an all-new roster led by Alex. Likewise, a new antagonist named Gill took over M. Bison's role from the previous games as the new boss character.

Street Fighter III was produced for the CD-ROM-based CP System III hardware, which allowed for more elaborate 2D graphics than the CPS II-based Street Fighter Alpha games (the previous incarnation of the Street Fighter series), while revamping many of the play mechanics. Despite the popularity of 3D polygonal fighting games at the time, Capcom decided to keep this game in 2D; 3D graphics were instead implemented in the spin-off game, Street Fighter EX.

Street Fighter III was followed by two updates: 2nd Impact in 1997, and 3rd Strike in 1999. A single home version of the game was released for the Dreamcast in 1999 and 2000, in a two-in-one compilation titled Street Fighter III: Double Impact, which consists of New Generation and 2nd Impact. Street Fighter III received a mainly positive reception, but did not manage to be a hit like its predecessor; it was followed by Street Fighter IV (2008).

== Gameplay ==
Like its predecessors, Street Fighter III is a one-on-one fighting game, in which two fighters use a variety of attacks and special moves to knock out their opponent. The gameplay of the original Street Fighter III has several new abilities and features introduced. Some abilities are also taken from other Capcom fighting games, such as players being able to dash or retreat like in the Darkstalkers series, as well as performing super jumps and quick stands after falling from an attack like in X-Men: Children of the Atom. The game also introduced leap attacks, which are small jumping attacks used against crouching opponents. As well, the player cannot perform aerial guards like in the Street Fighter Alpha series, which are replaced by parrying ("blocking" in the Japanese version).

The 1994 fighting game Samurai Shodown II is often credited with the first parry system. The main new feature is the ability to parry an opponent's attack, by deflecting any incoming attack without receiving damage. At the exact moment an opponent's attack is about to hit his or her character, the player can move the controller toward or down to parry the attack without receiving damage, leaving the opponent vulnerable for a counterattack. Additionally, this allows the player to defend against Special Moves and even Super Arts without sustaining the normal minor damage that blocking normally would incur. However, parrying requires precise timing.

The other new feature introduced in Street Fighter III is Super Arts. This is a powerful special move similar to a Super Combo in Super Turbo and the Alpha games. After selecting a character, the player will be prompted to select from one of three character-specific Super Arts to use in battle. Like the Super Combo gauge in previous games, the player has a Super Art gauge which will fill up as the player performs regular and special moves against an opponent. The player can only perform a Super Art once the gauge is filled. Depending on the Super Art chosen by the player, the length of the Super Art gauge will vary, as well as the amount of filled Super Art gauges the player can stock up. The players can now cancel a special move into a Super Art, a technique borrowed from Street Fighter EX.

Among the elaborated sprites include multiple hit stun sprites, including a new "turned-around state," in which a character is turned around (his or her back faces the opponent) after being hit. Only certain attacks can put characters in a turned-around state, and grabs and throws can now be comboed, as it typically takes longer for an attacked character to recover from this new type of hit stun.

== Characters ==
- Ryu - As usual, Ryu seeks to better his skills and find worthy opponents. Voiced by Wataru Takagi in New Generation and 2nd Impact, and by Toru Okawa in 3rd Strike.
- Ken - As the current U.S. martial arts champion, Ken seeks to test his strength against his old friend and rival Ryu, once again. Voiced by Koji Tobe in New Generation and 2nd Impact, and Yuji Kishi in 3rd Strike.
- Alex - The lead character of the Street Fighter III series. He fights with close-range grappling techniques and powerful punches. His initial goal is to avenge the defeat of his friend Tom at the hands of Gill. He later gets defeated by Ryu in Third Strike. Voiced by Michael Sommers in New Generation and 2nd Impact, and Patrick Gallagan in 3rd Strike.
- Dudley - A gentleman British boxer who seeks to recover his late father's antique Jaguar convertible from Gill. Voiced by Bruce Robertson in New Generation and 2nd Impact, and by Francis Diakowsky in 3rd Strike.
- Elena - An African princess from Kenya who uses the fighting style of capoeira. She seeks to make new friends. All of her attacks use her legs or feet, even the punch button attacks and throws. Voiced by Kaoru Fujino in New Generation and 2nd Impact, and Mie Midori in 3rd Strike.
- Ibuki - An aspiring female ninja who is sent to retrieve the G File from Gill's organization. Voiced by Yuri Amano in all three games in the series.
- Necro - A Russian man who was kidnapped and experimented on by Gill's organization. He seeks revenge only to get trapped and barely escape later on. Voiced by Michael X. Sommers in New Generation and 2nd Impact, and by Lawrence Bayne in 3rd Strike.
- Oro - A seclusive hermit who seeks a fighter worthy to inherit his fighting style. He binds one arm while fighting, to keep from accidentally killing his opponent (except when performing specific special techniques). Voiced by Kan Tokumaru in New Generation and 2nd Impact, and by Takashi Matsuyama in 3rd Strike.
- Sean - A young Japanese-Brazilian fighter who becomes Ken's self-appointed apprentice. Voice by Isshin Chiba in New Generation and 2nd Impact, and Mitsuo Iwata in 3rd Strike.
- Yun and Yang - Twin kung fu experts from Hong Kong who are young leaders of their city. While the two brothers are head-swaps, their move sets are identical and they share the same slot in the player select screen, but Yang was given a separate moveset and slot in 2nd Impact. Yun was voiced by Koji Tobe in New Generation and 2nd Impact, and by Kentaro Ito in 3rd Strike. Yang was voiced by Wataru Takagi in New Generation and 2nd Impact, and by Masakazu Suzuki in 3rd Strike.
- Gill - The leader of a secret organization which seeks to turn the Earth into a utopia. He can manipulate fire and ice. He is the final opponent for all the characters in New Generation and 3rd Strike, and for most of the characters in 2nd Impact. Gill is only playable in the console versions of the series. Voiced by Bruce Robertson in New Generation and 2nd Impact, and Lawrence Bayne in 3rd Strike.

== Development ==
On March 27, 1996, Capcom announced that Street Fighter III was in development during a meeting in Tokyo. They later stated that development took more than two years. Production at Capcom started in 1994, and was initially planned to be an original fighting game unrelated to the Street Fighter franchise. Street Fighter II series producer Noritaka Funamizu felt fatigued with the franchise due to dwindling sales on home consoles, and the emerging 3D fighting game market thanks to titles such as Virtua Fighter. Capcom, however, insisted to stick with 2D sprites for their games, and to this end started development on the CPS-3 arcade hardware to support higher color counts for said sprites. When executives at the company pushed for a follow-up to II, Funamizu declined as he wanted to develop a new game. At this point, producer Tomoshi Sadamoto began working on a game titled New Generation. Capcom character designer Akira Yasuda felt that the game's roster lacked personality. Additionally, he asserted the company was likely going to turn it into a Street Fighter title, and suggested pre-emptively to add that franchise's protagonist Ryu to the roster. He proved correct, as the game was retitled Street Fighter III: New Generation.

Though several other characters were also initially considered for inclusion from the Street Fighter II roster, particularly Ken and Chun-Li, the development team instead chose to focus on a mostly original cast. This proved some difficulty for Sadamoto, however, as he felt most of the designs were not as well established as those in II, and had particular difficulty in creating female character designs. Yasuda suggested to make the first female character a ninja, stating "Ninjas are cool!" While this led to the creation of Ibuki, another idea suggested was to introduce a character that was "Yuki in Africa" based on model Yuki Uchida. Yasuda designed the character, leading to the creation of Elena, which helped solidify the development team's vision for the rest of the game's roster. As development progressed, Ken was later also added to the roster. Meanwhile, when choosing a protagonist, they selected an American character, Alex, as they felt martial arts were more popular at the time in America and wanted to target that audience.

The finalized cast, however, still proved difficult to create. Yasuda continued to work on the character designs, attempting to stay within Sadamoto's design constraints unlike previous games where he made the design choices more directly. In an interview with gaming website Polygon, when asked if in retrospect the game would have done better if it had not been a Street Fighter title, Yasuda stated while he liked some of the characters, "if I had to change the past, I'd rather just not have worked on that game at all". Meanwhile, Capcom's North American branch's design support for the title, Chris Tang, expressed shock at seeing the new character designs once they were revealed, with the character Oro in particular causing him to question if Yasuda had left Capcom. Other issues arose from a lack of software support to develop for the CPS-3 hardware, and the amount of detail the higher resolutions demanded of the designs. Character balance also proved an issue, as unlike other Capcom fighting games, each developer was in charge of fine tuning their own character's gameplay, resulting in some feeling more suitable for Street Fighter's gameplay, while others felt more in line with Capcom's Darkstalkers fighting game franchise. The long development caused one planned character, Hugo, to be delayed until the game's follow up title, Street Fighter III: 2nd Impact.

The game was first unveiled at the Japan Amusement Machine and Marketing Association show in September 1996, in the form of a few minutes of footage incorporated into Capcom's PR demo tape. In an interview shortly before this show, Capcom senior planner Shinji Mikami stated that it would be impossible to convert Street Fighter III to any of the home consoles on the market at the time. This prompted rumors that it would be ported to the then-upcoming Panasonic M2. In January 1997, IGN witnessed a demonstration of the game in development on Nintendo 64 and 64DD; IGN and its anonymous insider speculated that the game might join the launch of the upcoming 64DD peripheral in Japan, which was scheduled for late 1997. Capcom referred to the Nintendo 64 release as "just a rumor", and Nintendo would coincidentally delay the launch of the 64DD peripheral until December 1999 anyway. Amending Mikami's earlier statement, in late 1997, Capcom said it might have been possible to port Street Fighter III to the Sega Saturn if one of the console's RAM expansion cartridges were used.

Because this and the next two Street Fighter III games run on the CPS III engine, more elaborate 2D sprites were created. Each character is made up from approximately 700–1200 individually drawn frames of animation, with the game running at 60 frames per second. General producer Noritaka Funamizu explained the controversial decision to keep the series in 2D: "We feel that 3D is not really suitable for the head-to-head fighting ... and, to be frank, Capcom doesn't really have the techniques to display high quality graphics in 3D."

=== Release ===
The game's name as it appears on the arcade cabinet is Three: A New Generation of Street Fighters.

In 1999, Capcom released Street Fighter III: Double Impact (Street Fighter III: W Impact in Japan) for the Dreamcast, a compilation containing the original game and 2nd Impact. The compilation features an Arcade, Versus, Training, and Option Mode for both games, as well as a "Parry Attack Mode" in 2nd Impact, where the player can test parrying skills in the game's bonus round. This compilation also allows players to use Gill (in both games) and Shin Akuma (in 2nd Impact only), who are exclusively computer-controlled characters in the arcade version.

New Generation was re-released in 2018 as part of the Street Fighter 30th Anniversary Collection for the PlayStation 4, Xbox One, PC, and Nintendo Switch.

=== Soundtrack ===
The soundtrack for New Generation was released on CD by First Smile Entertainment in 1997.

== Reception ==
Reception

Review scores
Publication	Score
Famitsu	Dreamcast: 31/40
Next Generation	Arcade: 4/5; Dreamcast: 3/5

In Japan, Game Machine listed Street Fighter III as the most successful arcade game of March 1997. However, the game struggled to break even in Japan, with a high budget of 1 billion yen ($8 million), while only selling 1,000 cabinets. Worldwide arcade sales estimates range from between 1,000 and 10,000 units sold.

Next Generation reviewed the arcade version of the game, rating it four stars out of five, and stated that "The great mystery is why Capcom called this SFIII instead of leaving that honor for a more powerful and revolutionary 3D title. Gameplay in the SF series reached the ceiling of 2D possibilities a while ago, and as good as this game admittedly is, besides the stunning graphics there's little to distinguish it from the 11 games before." GamePro similarly remarked that while the graphics are outstanding and the controls are flawless, the game lacks the innovation and series evolution that players expected it to deliver. They also said the new characters are a mix, with some of them seeming like they would be more appropriate for the Darkstalkers series, and concluded that the game "makes you look forward to the next SF installment rather than getting you excited about playing this one repeatedly".

Famitsu magazine scored Street Fighter III: Double Impact, the Dreamcast version of the game, 31 out of 40.

Jim Preston reviewed the Dreamcast version of the game for Next Generation, rating it three stars out of five, and stated that "It's a no-frills port of the arcade game that is great at a party but pointless for single players."
