= Alex (Street Fighter) =

Playable Street Fighter character

Alex Winger
- Street Fighter character
- Alex from Street Fighter III: 3rd Strike Online Edition
- First appearance: Street Fighter III: New Generation (1997)
- Created by: Tomoshi Sadamoto
- Designed by: Akira "Akiman" Yasuda
- Voiced by: English: Michael Sommers; Patrick Galligan (3rd Strike); Mark Whitten (Street Fighter V - 6); Japanese: Hiroki Yasumoto (Tatsunoko vs Capcom); Shintarō Asanuma (Street Fighter V - 6)
- Motion capture: Kenny Omega (SF6)

In-universe information
- Origin: New York, United States
- Nationality: American

Alex Winger (Japanese: アレックス・ウィンガー, Hepburn: Arekkusu Wingā) is a video game character from Capcom's Street Fighter series of fighting games. He was first introduced as the primary protagonist of Street Fighter III: New Generation, before going on to appear in later series entries.

== Conception and design ==
Alex was created early in development to be the protagonist of Street Fighter III, and was designed by "Akiman" Yasuda. Early versions of his character established him as a police officer that used to be a professional wrestler, influenced by how popular professional wrestling was at the time. They wanted a character that stood apart from Ryu, and was intended to be a simple protagonist so the supporting cast could be "flashy", with Sadamoto comparing it to how manga Saint Seiya approached its cast.

In the Street Fighter III series, Alex wears green overalls, green open-fingered gloves, brown combat boots, a red bandana, a scar on each of his shoulders, long blonde hair wrapped in a ponytail and make-up from the bottom of his eyes down to the rest of his face. Alex also sometimes wears a black tank top, which he rips off before he fights, and a bomber jacket when he isn't fighting. In Street Fighter V, Alex mostly retains his appearance. He wears red suspenders, has slightly shorter hair with no ponytail, and has a red and white long-sleeved buttoned flannel, which he either wears unbuttoned and sleeves rolled up, or wrapped around his waist. He wears green cargo pants, which are slightly torn up. Yasuda stated he developed Alex's face based on French actor Christopher Lambert, as artist Kinu Nishimura really liked his appearance. Nishimura stated that the paint on his face was inspired by the anime version of Devilman.

== Appearances ==
Alex made his first appearance in Street Fighter III: New Generation. Tom, his mentor and legal guardian, got in a fight with Gill, the president of the Illuminati and lost. Tom was sent into a hospital as a result of the fight. This angered Alex and prompted him to enter the third World Warrior tournament hosted by Gill in order to kill him. Alex beats Gill and wins the tournament, but does not kill Gill. Gill is impressed about Alex's skills after their encounter thinks there's something special about Alex. Alex eventually returns to Tom as a changed person after fighting various people around the world.

Alex returns in Street Fighter III: Third Strike with a slightly different personality, He met Ryu and fought him, only to lose, in which Ryu told Alex to explore the world and find worthy fighters. He re-encountered Ryu and decided to fight again, although the outcome of the fight hasn't been revealed yet in the story.

After not appearing in a mainline Street Fighter game, Alex came back in Street Fighter V as DLC, which is set before Street Fighter III. He is a top wrestler in a pro-wrestling league. One day, after working on his broken-down trailer, he gets kidnapped by Shadaloo and F.A.N.G. for assessment of his skills, where he's pitted against simulations of multiple fighters, such as Ryu and Chun-Li. When he realizes that he's been kidnapped, he throws down a simulated fighter to try and destroy the facility he's trapped in but gets knocked out before he can and is sent back to his trailer. He wakes up, thinking it's a dream, but when Patricia comes to his trailer with a porcelain chess piece, which is a key to a Black Moon, a satellite that can be rigged to launch an electromagnetic pulse that can black out entire cities, and a certificate, and notices a scar on him, Alex realizes it's not a dream.

Alex reappears as a playable character in Street Fighter V as the first of six characters to be released after the game's launch in 2016. He was released March 30, 2016. His prologue shows that he was kidnapped by Shadaloo, led by F.A.N.G. before the assassin decide to return him to his hometown when he tried to destroy the secret facilities and attempt to expose it.

In the story mode of Street Fighter V, "A Shadow Falls", Alex is at a pro-wrestling tournament in his debut, where he wins and gets the wrestling trophy. He then fights in a tag-team exhibition match with Laura against Zangief and R. Mika, which is broadcast live on television. However the signal cuts out due to a Black Moon detonating over New York City, causing a blackout. Dhalsim comes to his trailer, wanting the chess piece, but Alex believes Dhalsim is a mugger and fights him. Dhalsim convinces Alex that he's not a mugger and asks for the piece, in which Alex gives it to him, saying he didn't need it. Dhalsim then tells Alex that big things will happen to him in the future, foreshadowing his story Street Fighter III onward, and teleports away.

Alex returned in Street Fighter 6, now performing as a professional wrestling heel, with the added reveal of his last name being Winger. He and Patricia are now married, with the couple expecting a daughter.

Alex makes an appearance in Tatsunoko vs. Capcom as a playable character, alongside other Street Fighter characters, Ryu and Chun-Li. He also appears in Capcom Fighting Evolution and was meant to appear in the cancelled Capcom Fighting All-Stars.

== Promotion and reception ==
To promote the release of New Generation, several items of merchandise were created featuring Alex, including phone cards and a wall clock. Meanwhile, for 3rd Strike's Online Edition, player avatar items of the character were released for Sony's PlayStation Network. A gashapon figure of Alex's Midnight Bliss transformation from Capcom Fighting Evolution was also released in 2005. A stationary miniature was also released by Jasco Games, as part of a Street Fighter III character pack. As part of his appearance in Street Fighter 6, Alex was given an original vocal theme, "Go! Alex! Hope is Born!", performed by JAM Project.

Alex was mostly well received upon debut, with several outlets praising him as one of the best characters from Street Fighter III and the series overall. D. F. Smith of IGN stated that Alex served as much a departure from the norm for Capcom as his game of origin, stating he "broke the mold for fighting heroes in all kinds of ways" in how different he was from the more "conservative" Ryu and Ken in terms of design and gameplay. Smith pointed out that Alex was "unexpectedly quirky", designed with players that wanted to get up close to their opponents in mind, and his shaggy appearance and face paint made him feel more like someone able to act as a bouncer at the roughest of establishments. Meanwhile, the staff of GamesRadar stated that while Alex had been position to be the series' frontman, the character was not that popular. However at the same time, they enjoyed that there was a captivating machismo to the character, and how many of his attacks reflected real-life wrestling moves in the WWE.

Gavin Jasper of Den of Geek described Alex as a parody of fellow character Guile, noting that both men had a similar story of searching for revenge. However, while Guile's was portrayed as a righteous mission, Jasper felt Alex's demonstrated he had a short temper and did not think things out fully. He further stated that due to Capcom's tendency to downplay Street Fighter III in recent years Alex had been underutilized, appreciating the character and acknowledging that while he wasn't the strongest character in the franchise, he was still shown "having the time of his life". Jasper called Alex as the highlight of Street Fighter III due to both his character moveset but also his portrayal during the attacks, describing his voice as sounding rugged and adding "Something about his line delivery gives it an extra bit of oomph when you’re slamming your opponent". The staff of Micom BASIC offered similar praise, feeling he was a different kind of protagonist for the series in his gameplay and as a "cool-type" character attractive for both his masculinity and roughness.

=== Street Fighter 6 storyline controversy ===
Alex's Street Fighter 6 storyline where he marries Patricia resulted in controversy among fans and media outlets, as in the game's World Tour mode, he establishes that he saw Tom as his father, who was now established as his mother's cousin and made his daughter Patricia now Alex's second cousin. The relationship was questioned as possibly incestuous between step-siblings by fans as a result, though some were quick to point out Tom's stated role as Alex's adopted father was strictly a part the UDON comics canon. Carlos Zotomayor of Automaton Media meanwhile examined the localization between the games, and pointed out that in Japanese, Tom was established as Alex's sodate no oya, a more ambiguous term that implies a parental caretaker and not in the adoptive sense. He further pointed out that while Patricia was Alex's second cousin, them married was considered legal in every state across the United States.

Jack Coleman of TheGamer found the situation weird, pointing out that earlier story material for Alex suggested that he "loved her like a sister". However, he suggested the change to Tom and Alex's relationship may have been due to societal norms in Japan, where often another family member takes in a child instead of a friend of the family. He added that while Patricia was Alex's second cousin, they did not count as blood relatives, but still expressed that them being adopted siblings was odd enough and questioned the necessity to make them related. Isaiah Colbert of Aftermath found the changes to Alex and Patricia's relationship extremely unnecessary, calling it "grounds for character assassination for anyone who had him as their main", and expressing that them being adopted siblings was weird on its own and only made worse by them being related. The game's director, Takayuki Nakayama, released a statement apologizing for any confusion regarding Alex's story and said they "plan to revise certain text passages that may have been misleading in the near future." The story was updated the following month, altering Tom to instead be a "distant relative" of Alex's mother.

=== Analysis of design ===
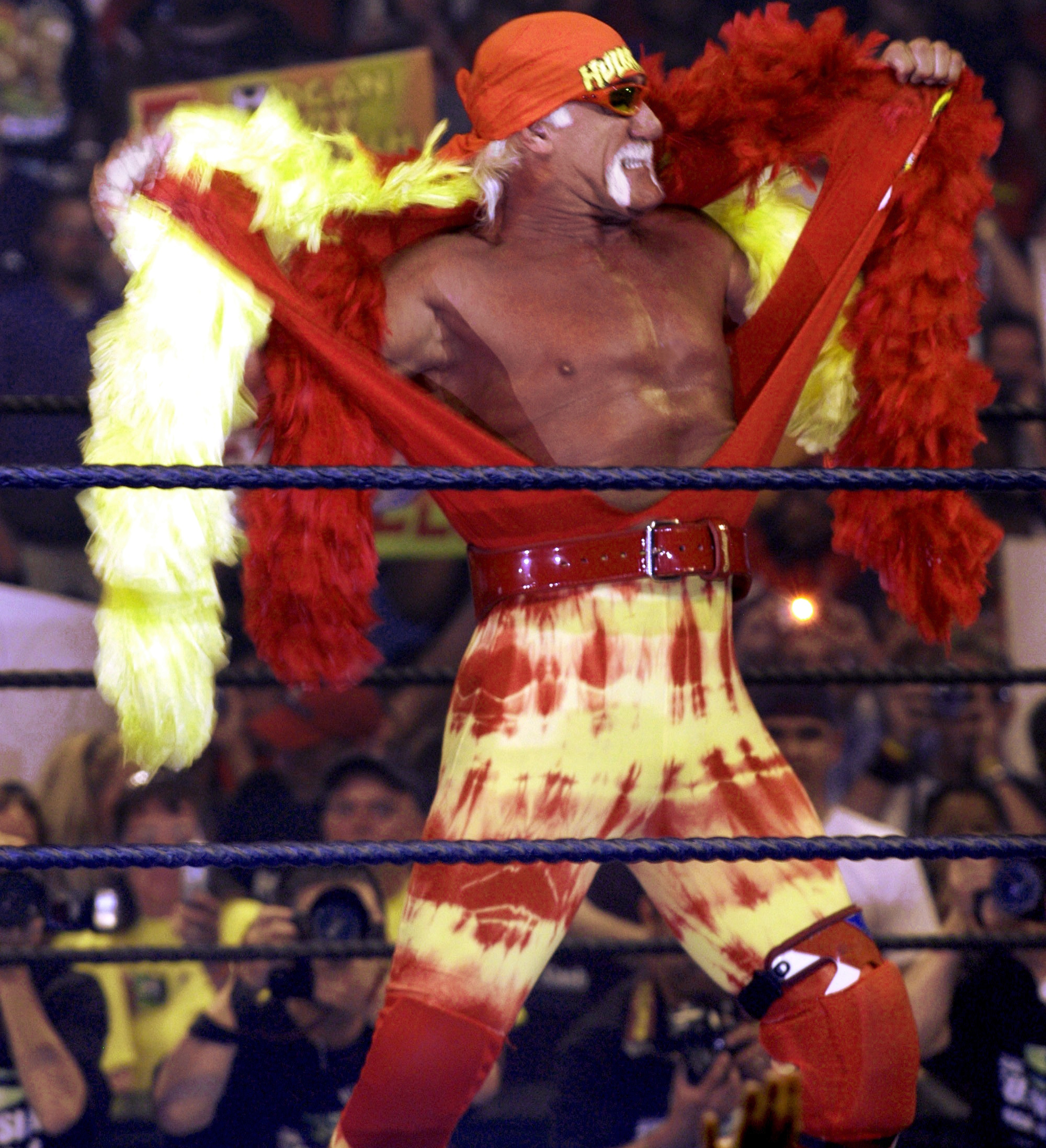
Alex's design has been compared to professional wrestler Hulk Hogan.

Gaming journalist John Learned in his YouTube series examining the Street Fighter characters stated that Alex's appearance, story, and moveset helped form Street Fighter III's overall design, citing Sadamoto's background with Capcom in developing their wrestling games. In particular he noted similarities between Alex and professional wrestler Hulk Hogan, emphasized in the game by his pre-match introduction animation of ripping off his shirt and his rivalry with Hugo drawing similarities to Hogan's match with Andre the Giant, a real-life figure Hugo was based on. Learned also felt that as the series progressed, Alex began to develop as a character, demonstrating traits more in line with series protagonist Ryu in that he leaves his desire for revenge behind him and instead searches for stronger opponents to bring himself a sense of purpose and inner strength, something he felt came full circle with his portrayal in 3rd Strike. Emphasis was put on Alex's name due to its meaning as "protector", while Learned also drawing parallels to conquers Alexander the Great as a possible source of inspiration for the name.

Shivam Bhatt on a podcast for Retronauts felt Alex played poorly as a character meant to be the protagonist of the series, noting that while he was intended to be a grappler archetype in the game he didn't play as one, and his gameplay didn't seem to improve until his appearance in later games. Meanwhile Learned, who was also a guest on the podcast, stated he was surprised they made an American character the protagonist of the series, as it deviated from the trend of Japanese fighting games to use a Japanese protagonist, something the other commentators agreed with. Host Diamond Feit proposed the use of a character with blonde hair may have been intended to give a more exotic feel to the title, noting how blonde hair was often used as shorthand in Japanese works to indicate something "foreign".

Hardcore Gaming 101 podcast commentator "Xerxes" meanwhile cited Alex as an example of how people found many of the characters in Street Fighter III offputting, something that surprised his co-hosts. Clarifying, he expressed that while the series had been known for caricatures to that point, comparing it to Nintendo's Punch-Out!! in that regard but with more innovative names. To him though Alex felt contrary to that, a terrible character that was "just a guy" that did not bring anything fun. In contrast, Bhatt on the Retronauts podcast considered this a point of praise for Street Fighter III, as he felt it demonstrated a departure from its predecessor's over-reliance on cultural caricatures particularly in how Alex was in the first game the only regular white person in the title.
