= El Fuerte (Street Fighter) =

Street Fighter character

- Street Fighter character
- El Fuerte, as illustrated by Capcom
- First appearance: Street Fighter IV (2008)
- Voiced by: EN: JB Blanc; JA: Daisuke Ono
- Portrayed by: Christian Valle (2026 film, game)

In-universe information
- Fighting style: Lucha libre
- Origin: Mexico
- Nationality: Mexican

El Fuerte (Japanese: エル・フォルテ) is a character from Capcom's Street Fighter franchise. The character debuted in the 2008 fighting game Street Fighter IV and returned for its following updates, including Super Street Fighter IV in 2010 and Ultra Street Fighter IV in 2014. El Fuerte is represented as a Mexican linked with professional wrestling and carries an obsession with cooking. His voice was provided by actors JB Blanc for English and Daisuke Ono for Japanese.

== Characteristics ==
El Fuerte is from Mexico, standing at 168 centimeters with a weight of 70 kilograms. He learned lucha libre wrestling from his trainer, Meteorito Jr. El Fuerte often speaks aloud about cooking ideas, even in the middle of fighting someone. His passion for cooking is a central aspect of his character, with his inspiration frequently drawn from the international backgrounds of other fighters he encounters. According to the book "Street Fighter IV Prima Official Game Guide", the results of his cooking are inconsistent, sometimes impressing others while disappointing some. His special gameplay moves, including the Tepache Bomb, Chili Mexicano, Tostada Press, Fajita Buster, Quesadilla Bomb, and Guacamole Leg Throw, reference traditional Mexican dishes. El Fuerte's design features golden belt, black elbow pads, white pants styled after a chef's uniform, white-laced wrestling boots with golden soles, and a white wrestling mask that matches the outfit.

== In other media ==
El Fuerte makes a brief appearance in the 2026 Street Fighter film played by Christian Valle. He is more rotund in appearance and is seen battling Ken Masters, using his signature frying pan, before easily being knocked out by his opponent.

== Critical reception ==
In a study published by Drexel University on the representation of Mexican video game characters titled "Digital Mexican: Visual Representation in Video Games", multiple participants were asked how well El Fuerte represents their culture. Most of the individuals provided positive comments about the character, along with reasons. They mainly pointed out his connection with lucha libre and his suitability for it. Video game journalist Gavin Jasper from the Den of Geek website rated him at rank 72 on his ranking of Street Fighter characters and said that he was excited at first when El Fuerte was revealed but later found him irritating and criticized his chef gimmick, which he described as awful; at most, the thing he liked about El Fuerte was his relation with the character Rainbow Mika that was showcased in a comic.

Associate Professor Daniel Calleros Villarreal of the University of Arizona sees El Fuerte as a character built to show Mexican identity in different ways. In his study Digital Narratives and Linguistic Articulations of Mexican Identities in Emergent Media: Race, Lucha Libre Masks and Mock Spanish, he explains that El Fuerte combines two powerful symbols of Mexican culture: professional wrestling (especially the wrestling style called lucha libre) and cuisine. His mask connects him to wrestling tradition, while his chef-like outfit and constant talk about food emphasize cooking as another marker of Mexicanity, especially since Mexican cuisine has been recognized worldwide as part of the country's cultural heritage. Even his name is a reference to this mix, as the name "El Fuerte" is related to both terms "the strong one" and "the main dish". Villarreal notes that while El Fuerte celebrates these aspects of culture, his design also ties into stereotypes, such as images of Mexicans crossing the border, showing how games can both honor and complicate cultural depiction.

Ryan Clements, who was a contributor and content manager to the IGN gaming website, specifically discussed El Fuerte's gameplay in Street Fighter IV. He explained that El Fuerte's fighting style is unusual compared to other grapplers, as most grappling characters focus on getting close to their opponent and staying there to land powerful throws. El Fuerte, however, relies on constant movement and speed. Clements exemplified some of El Fuerte's moves, notably the "Habanero Dash", which lets him quickly run across the stage and change directions at any moment. Players can even cancel the dash and link it into other moves, making El Fuerte hard to predict and difficult to hit due to his mobility. Clements defined El Fuerte as a character with a lot of creative potential, so the players will require a high amount of patience to master him.
