= Gill (Street Fighter) =

Playable Street Fighter character

- Street Fighter character
- Gill in Street Fighter III: 3rd Strike
- First game: Street Fighter III (1997)
- Created by: Tomoshi Sadamoto
- Designed by: Akira "Akiman" Yasuda
- Voiced by: English: Bruce Robertson; Lawrence Bayne (3rd Strike); Liam O'Brien (SFV); Japanese: Fumihiko Tachiki (SFV)

In-universe information
- Fighting style: Secret Society techniques
- Origin: Mediterranean

Gill (Japanese: ギル, Hepburn: Giru) is a character in the Street Fighter series of video games by Capcom, first appearing in Street Fighter III: New Generation.

== Conception and development ==
When developing the cast for Street Fighter III: New Generation, producer Tomoshi Sadamoto wanted a character that could be seen as transcending humanity, both "visually and impactfully". Unlike the antagonist of the previous games, M. Bison, Gill was not supposed to be a villain despite wanting to control the world, but a multifaceted character that was not a hero either and act as a contrast to Bison. Gill was meant to be portrayed as not really a fighter but someone mysterious, able to control fire and ice, the latter of which was seen by Sadamoto as more unnatural and made Gill more of a science fiction character. A character that could manipulate both fire and ice was something he had wanted to do with a character since his work on Capcom's Dungeons & Dragons: Tower of Doom, and while he considered adding other elemental attributes Sadamoto realized this may have been a bit excessive for one character.

Though Sadamoto had something in mind akin to a Greek pankration sculpture, character designer Akira "Akiman" Yasuda turned in a rough draft of a character with a line drawn down the middle, and separated into two colors, which Sadamoto felt was influenced by the characters Android Kikaider and JoJo's Bizarre Adventure's J. Geil. Yasuda wanted Gill to be seen as someone far from normal, leaving the player to question how he had become that way, and as a religious leader it had to be portrayed in a different manner than Bison. Early in development, several names were considered for the character before deciding on Gill, including Pantheon, Raios, Gemini, and Ajax.

=== Design ===
Standing 6 feet 10 inches (208 cm) tall, Gill is a muscular man with long flowing blond hair. The right side of his body colored red, and the left side colored blue, while his standard outfit consists of a loincloth. In terms of personality, they wanted to portray him as someone naturally charismatic that enjoyed fighting. Despite wanting to conquer the world, Gill's intentions were meant to not be seen as prideful but something that came as a natural ambition. Gill is unique in Street Fighter III in that the sides of his body will be colored correctly regardless of which direction he is facing, and his abilities will also change according to the direction faced.

When Gill returned for Street Fighter V, a prequel to the Street Fighter III games, an idea was considered to have his body be blue with red colorings diagonally across it, while his hands and feet were shackled. This idea was ultimately cut however, as the development team felt his design was too impactful to change and adding elements would make it less appealing, instead deciding to focus on refining his gameplay.

== Appearances ==
Gill is the main antagonist and final boss of the Street Fighter III series. At the start of the series he is the President of the Illuminati, a secret society that has controlled the underworld for thousands of years and seeks to turn the whole world into a utopia by causing an armageddon. His ultimate goal is to test the skills of several warriors and coerce them into his cause. 2nd Impact introduces Gill's younger brother Urien as a player character of similar build and attire but with short hair; in addition, Urien's body is the same color on both sides. In Urien's ending, Gill is revealed to have been promoted after Urien takes over Gill's former presidency, which he still holds by the time of 3rd Strike

Gill is not playable in any of the arcade versions of the Street Fighter III games. However, he is selectable once he is unlocked from within the console versions of 2nd Impact and 3rd Strike. Gill makes his playable debut in Street Fighter V as a playable character in the Champion Edition update.

== Promotion and reception ==
To support the release of 3rd Strike's Online Edition, player avatar items of the character were released for Sony's PlayStation Network.

Gill received mixed reception since his debut, with Paste magazine describing him as polarizing. Further describing him as an "Adonis with a penchant for narcissism", they felt he was a one-note character who existed more to illustrate the graphical power of Street Fighter III. They added he became more of an afterthought with the introduction of his brother Urien, and closed by stating "beauty is only skin-deep, even in Street Fighter". Amanda LaPergola and Becky Chambers of The Mary Sue questioned his role as an antagonist, comparing him to Street Fighter II's M. Bison and feeling that the latter was more appropriately presented in attire and attitude as "proper villainy". They further mocked his backstory as ridiculous, particularly due to the inclusion of the Illuminati, as well as his lofty goals that felt overcomplicated the story in a way previous series antagonists had not.

In an article discussing the enduring nature of the Street Fighter series bosses, Famitsu compared him to Baron Ashura of the Mazinger anime and manga series due to his introduction and use of fire and ice, further expressing that he gave a strong impression due to his ability to resurrect himself but also his super attacks. Lucas Sullivan of GamesRadar+ meanwhile called him "the godfather of infuriating final boss fights", stating that while his moves were overpowered his resurrection abiliy fundamentally changed how players approached the fight, seeking ways to prevent it before dealing the finishing blow. However, Mikel Reparaz of the same publication stated Gill was "just interesting enough to merit another appearance", if only to allow players to illustrate how overpowered a character he was to Street Fighter V final boss Seth.

Gavin Jasper of Den of Geek stated that while the development team had a tall order to fill for an antagonist after M. Bison, he felt they succeeded with Gill, a character that unlike Bison's cartoonishly evil demeanor was simply cartoonish. He elaborated that instead of a dictator he was presented as a religious zealot, and an insane narcissist but well-meaning. He further felt the manner in which he was implemented into the game heightened this effect and coupled with his "control over fire, ice, and resurrection, the guy kind of deserves to be so full of himself." At the same time however he acknowledged that characters such as Necro illustrated despite his self-righteousness he was still a villain, albeit one that provided "a fresh take on the mustache-twirling monsters in these games" with someone who wanted to be virtuous but was still an egomaniac while representing the possible evils of organized religion.

Retronauts on their podcast meanwhile expressed they felt Gill appeared to fit more in a SNK produced title, in that he resembled someone human but at the same time was by no means a person you would normally meet, while sharing many traits with SNK's fighting game bosses in that they were often unfair and designed more as a quarter-devouring obstacle in arcades. However they also pointed out Gill represented the a trope of fighting a god, in this instance a Christian representation, something they felt American audiences were not used to at the time with commentator John Learned stating "this was like weird taboo to me, like, I'm gonna beat up on Jesus. Is that, are we for real right now?" This aspect in his eyes added mystique to Gill and gave the game itself a "dangerous feel". He furthermore felt this symbolism was continued with the introduction of Urien, who had aspects of a Greco-Roman in contrast to his brother's Christian themes.
