= Street Fighter IV =

2008 video game

- Promotional poster for the original arcade release, featuring Ryu and the game's first four newcomers: Abel, Rufus, Crimson Viper and El Fuerte
- Developers: Dimps; Capcom
- Publisher: Capcom
- Director: Takashi Tsukamoto
- Producer: Yoshinori Ono
- Designer: Hirotoshi Shiozaki
- Programmer: Ryosuke Nakano
- Artist: Daigo Ikeno
- Composer: Hideyuki Fukasawa
- Series: Street Fighter
- Engine: MT Framework
- Platforms: Arcade, PlayStation 3, Xbox 360, Windows, iOS, Android, PlayStation 4
- Release: July 18, 2008: Arcade; JP: July 18, 2008; NA: August 12, 2008 PlayStation 3, Xbox 360; JP: February 12, 2009; NA: February 17, 2009; EU: February 20, 2009 Windows; JP: July 2, 2009; EU: July 3, 2009; NA: July 7, 2009 iOS March 10, 2010 Android; JP: May 2012
- Genre: Fighting
- Modes: Single-player, multiplayer
- Arcade system: Taito Type X^{2} Taito Type X^{3} (Ultra)

Street Fighter IV (Note: Japanese: ストリートファイター IV, Hepburn: Sutorīto Faitā Fō) is a 2008 fighting game developed by Capcom and Dimps and published by Capcom. It was the first original main entry in the Street Fighter series after eleven years of hiatus and the sequel to Street Fighter III (1997). Designed for the Taito Type X2 arcade hardware, it was ported with additional features in 2009 to PlayStation 3, Xbox 360 and Windows, along with mobile versions later on.

The game features 3D models, but the gameplay and its mechanics otherwise remain in the traditional 2D style the series is known for. Street Fighter IV received universal critical acclaim; receiving universally high scores from many gaming websites and magazines, it has often been cited as one of the greatest games of all time. It was followed by an updated version for consoles in 2010 called Super Street Fighter IV, itself followed by an arcade update called Arcade Edition which was then ported to consoles in 2011, and later in 2014, Ultra Street Fighter IV. All versions of Street Fighter IV have sold over 9 million units across all platforms. Street Fighter IV was succeeded by Street Fighter V in 2016.

== Gameplay ==
An in-game screenshot showing Abel attacking Ryu in the Crowded Downtown stage

Producer Yoshinori Ono stated that he wanted to keep the game closer to Street Fighter II. The battles in SFIV begin with a short pre-fight intro, a small cinematic dialogue sequence which varies depending on the player's chosen character. A new system called Focus Attacks (Saving Attack for the Japanese version) has been introduced, as well as Ultra Moves. The traditional six-button control scheme returns, with new features and Special Moves integrated into the input system, mixing classic gameplay with additional innovations.

The game arguably has a similar feel to Super Street Fighter II Turbo, but also includes a few features from Street Fighter III: 3rd Strike. As in Street Fighter III, throwing is performed by pressing both light attack buttons, while pressing both heavy attack buttons performs the character's personal action or taunt. Pressing both medium attack buttons performs a character's Focus Attack. Dashes and quick standing are also in the game. C. Viper and Dan (with the air taunt) are the only characters who can perform a high jump.

It was intended that bonus rounds such as the car-smashing stage from earlier Street Fighter games would return. Ono later stated that the bonus stages would not be in the arcade game, citing the reason to be that the time players spend on bonus stages is a time during which they have no chance of losing, which ultimately takes money from arcade operators. The bonus stages were later added in Super Street Fighter IV. There are also Rival Battles which have a cutscene between two characters (which depends on who they are) before the battle starts.

Focus Attacks, known as Saving Attack in the Japanese version, is a new system introduced in Street Fighter IV. The Focus Attack is a move that allows the player to absorb an attack and launch a counterattack, and it is performed by holding the medium punch and medium kick buttons simultaneously. There are two phases to the attack. In the first phase, the player will shift into a new stance, at which point they are able to absorb a single hit from the opponent. The second phase is the counterattack. The longer the player holds down the medium punch and kick buttons, the more powerful the attack will be. There are three stages to the charge.

- If the Focus Attack is held for a brief moment, no unique effects occur when attacking.
- If held for slightly longer, the character charging the Focus Attack will flash white, indicating that it will crumple the opponent (if they are on the ground).
- When fully charged, the attack will also ignore blocking.

Attacks that were absorbed during the first phase of a Focus Attack still cause damage to the player; however, life lost from the opponent's attack will be quickly regenerated afterward. In addition, during the first and second phase of the Focus Attack, the player may perform a dash either forward or backward to cancel the Focus Attack. Finally, at the cost of two bars of the Super Combo gauge, many Special Moves can be canceled into a Focus Attack. By executing a Focus Attack during the Special Move, the animation of the move will be cut short and go instantly into the Focus Attack animation. This allows players with precise timing to cancel Special Moves into Focus Attacks, and in turn cancel Focus Attacks into the forward dash, resulting in new combo possibilities. If a Special Move is blocked by the opponent, the new system allows players to cancel the blocked move with a Focus Attack, and then cancel the Focus Attack by dashing backward safely away from the opponent. Ono has stated that this system was incorporated in order to shift the emphasis away from combos and toward a more realistic system he has compared to boxing, in which "the skill is in reading your opponent's move before [they start] moving ... We haven't forgotten about combos and linked moves, but focus makes it so that you have to read your opponent." The system aims to make ground attacks as viable a way of approaching opponents as jumping was in previous games. The focus system is a core part of Street Fighter IV's gameplay.

In addition to the powered-up versions of Special Moves introduced in previous Street Fighter games such as Super Combos and EX Special Moves, the game also introduces a new type of powered-up Special Move officially dubbed the Ultra Combo. Ultra Combos are long and cinematic moves featuring a lengthy combination of punches, kicks and other fighting techniques. Just as there is a Super Combo gauge, there is also an Ultra Combo gauge (officially known as the Revenge Gauge or Revenge Meter), but whereas the Super Combo gauge fills up when the player hits their opponent or performs a Special Move, the Revenge Gauge fills when one takes damage from their opponent (similar to the K Groove featured in Capcom vs. SNK 2). Along with the Super Combos, Ultra Combos are one of the only times (besides Zangief, E. Honda, Seth and Abel's command throws) the camera breaks from its normal fixed position to show a more dynamic, cinematic view of the gameplay.

== Plot ==
Street Fighter IV takes place several months after the events of Street Fighter II and before the events of Street Fighter V (thus is chronologically set before Street Fighter III which takes place four years in the future of the late-1990s).

After M. Bison's survival following his encounter with Akuma, the S.I.N. corporation began another fighting tournament in order to draw out the most powerful street fighters on Earth to complete the BLECE project. Each World Warrior has their own reasons for entering this tournament, but S.I.N.'s real desire is to lure Ryu to them in order to analyze the Satsui no Hado, believed to be the last piece of data needed to complete BLECE.

Gouken, having recently awakened from a coma after surviving an attack by Akuma which occurred between the events of Street Fighter and Street Fighter Alpha about seven years before, knowing of SIN's interest in Ryu, starts looking for him to instruct to stop his Satsui no Hado development. He instructs Ryu and shows him a power known as the Mu no Ken (or Power of Nothingness), which is essentially the opposite of Satsui no Hado, where calm and tranquility transcend human powers.

Akuma, knowing what Gouken has done to Ryu, has become driven with fury and has a fight to the death with Gouken once again, releasing everything from his Satsui no Hado against all the power of Gouken's Mu no Ken.

It is revealed that Crimson Viper was a double agent, and she betrayed Seth, in addition to Juri who also wanted to see Shadaloo's total downfall, and set up the fight between M. Bison and Seth. Although Seth took over SIN, M. Bison managed to take on the consciousness of another clone thanks to the scientists at Shadaloo, and ends up with Seth.

M. Bison is behind the SIN, letting the plans go, while everyone thinks he is dead, and the Seth that the players find at the end of the game is revealed to be a clone, as the real Seth was killed by M. Bison.

Abel, who is a fighter with no memory, supposedly was saved by Charlie Nash and joins Chun-Li and Guile to destroy the SIN headquarters, so they manage to end this organization.

== Characters ==
Chronologically set between the Street Fighter II series and the Street Fighter III series, the playable character roster of the arcade version includes the cast of the original Street Fighter II (all 12 characters, including the four Shadaloo Grand Masters) and four new characters. Akuma from Super Street Fighter II Turbo also appears as a hidden playable character, as well as a special opponent, for a total of 17 playable characters. Additionally, the game includes two more computer-controlled characters: Seth as the game's standard final boss, and Gouken as one of special opponent, which makes for a total of 19 characters. The console version makes these two characters playable and includes 6 more characters to the roster, making for a total of 25. The returning characters are: Cammy, Dan, Fei Long, Gen, Rose and Sakura.

Newcomers:

- Abel, a French fighter who utilizes full-contact karate, Judo and Russian combat sambo to defeat opponents (note his kurtka). He is described as an amnesiac, a "man with no past" looking to defeat surviving members of Shadaloo. He is later revealed to be a prototype for the game's antagonist, Seth.
- Crimson Viper (stylized as C. Viper), a female American spy wearing sunglasses, leather gloves and a form-fitting suit with weapons she entered the tournament in order to "test" her skills.
- Juri Han, a South Korean Taekwondo fighter employed by S.I.N. and an underling to Seth.
- Rufus, an obese kung fu fighter, who seeks to fight Ken to prove himself as the best fighter in the United States.
- El Fuerte (Spanish for "The Strong One"), a Mexican luchador and aspiring gourmet chef.
- Seth, also known as "The Puppet Master", is the new boss character. He is the CEO of S.I.N., the weapons division of Shadaloo. His body has been modified using advanced technology. His Special Moves are techniques used by other characters.
- Gouken, the elder brother of Akuma, and Ryu and Ken's master, appears in the arcade version as a secret computer-controlled challenger at the end of the single-player mode, making his debut as a fighter in the Street Fighter series.
- Hakan, a tall oil wrestler from Turkey. His fighting style is based on Yağlı güreş and involves him coating himself in oil to make his body slippery. The president of his own company, Hakan seeks to create the perfect olive oil.
- Decapre, an imperfect clone of series antagonist M. Bison who resembles Cammy. She goes on a murderous rampage after escaping Shadaloo, but is rescued by Cammy and given a new lease on life.

== Development ==
Before producer Yoshinori Ono pitched the idea to Capcom R&D head Keiji Inafune, the prevailing attitude around Capcom was that a new numeric entry to the Street Fighter series would not be made. Initially, there was much resistance to Ono's pitch for a new Street Fighter game so many years after the original. The gap from 2000 to 2008, since Street Fighter EX3, the latest Street Fighter game at that point, represented the longest time the series had gone without a sequel. However, in light of fan demand plus the positive reception to Street Fighter II' Hyper Fighting on Xbox Live Arcade, Inafune eventually allowed the project to begin. This was Ono's first take on a new entry for the Street Fighter series as a producer, although he had previously worked on Street Fighter III 3rd Strike as a "sound management director" and previously produced Capcom Fighting Jam. The experience provided by Super Street Fighter II Turbo became the main influence for the Street Fighter IV development team.

The original game concept, titled Street Fighter IV Flashback, imagined in part by David Sirlin, the designer of Super Street Fighter II Turbo HD Remix, never made it past the proposal stage. Flashback would likewise feature the 2.5D gameplay and a roster made of classic Street Fighter II characters plus Sakura and a few new characters. The game would have also featured a single-player mode with third-person 3D action (similar to this of the God of War series) that focused on Ryu's backstory, as well as all Street Fighter arcade games in their original forms and a 3D version of Super Turbo. Flashback's proposed easy control system was later used in Tatsunoko vs. Capcom, minus its titular "flashback" gameplay feature.

While Street Fighter IV features models and backgrounds rendered in 3D, the gameplay remains on a traditional 2D plane, with the camera having freedom to move in 3D at certain times during fights, for dramatic effect, similar to the Street Fighter EX series Capcom produced with Arika. Initially, the title had been developed to use 3D hitboxes, but the testers felt it did not have the "pixel perfect" precision of a Street Fighter game, and the game was therefore changed to use 2D hitboxes. Ono has also cited the arcade version of Arc System Works' Battle Fantasia as the inspiration for the game's three-dimensional art style. Art director and character designer Daigo Ikeno, who previously worked on Street Fighter III 3rd Strike, opted for non-photorealistic rendering to give them a hand-drawn look, with visual effects accented in calligraphic strokes, ink smudges and ink sprays during the fights.

Street Fighter IV's musical score was primarily composed by Hideyuki Fukasawa. The game's music consisted of new and old material created for it. Several music pieces (such as the themes for the returning SFII characters) were rearranged for SFIV. While previous Street Fighter games contained limited voice work, Street Fighter IV was the first Street Fighter series game to feature extensive voice acting. The game offers a choice between the original Japanese or an English dub.

The game runs on the Taito Type X^{2} arcade board inside a Taito Vewlix cabinet. It takes advantage of the Type X^{2}'s network capabilities and allows players in separate machines within the same LAN to fight each other.

== Home versions ==
It was originally released on arcades in Japan in July 2008 and North America in August the same year.

Versions for PlayStation 3 and Xbox 360 were released in February 2009 and a Microsoft Windows version was released in July 2009. These featured additional playable characters and features not found in the arcade game.

Capcom later released an iOS version on March 10, 2010. An Android version was launched initially as an exclusive for certain LG devices in May 2012, and was later made available for all Android devices on the Play Store by December 31, 2012, with a region restriction that made it available only in Japan. In March 2017 the Xbox 360 version of Street Fighter IV became compatible with the Xbox One.

=== Additional characters ===
The notable addition in the home versions of Street Fighter IV are eight unlockable and playable characters not available in the arcade version. Seth and Gouken, computer-played characters in the arcade, and six characters from other Street Fighter games were added, to a total of 25 characters, all of them playable. The introduced characters are Dan, Fei Long, Sakura, Cammy, Gen and Rose.

=== Additional features ===
Home versions also feature online play, six new stages, downloadable content, a Challenge Mode that acts as a training module for new and experienced players, requiring them to reproduce indicated moves or combos with successive levels of increasing complexity, as well as selectable Japanese or English voices for the characters for cutscenes and gameplay (including an option individually set the audio language for each character for gameplay after clearing Arcade Mode at least once) (similar to the voice option settings in the Soulcalibur games), making Street Fighter IV the first game in the series since the original Street Fighter to feature English voice acting for all the characters. The game also offers a new opening cinematic scene featuring the theme song "The Next Door", by Exile, in both Japanese and English (as "The Next Door ~Indestructible~", which featured Flo Rida in the full version for that song) (depending on cutscene audio language settings), and animated opening and ending sequences for each character's story in Arcade mode.

The iOS version allows for bluetooth-based multiplayer between devices, but features only eight of the console version's characters and stages. The characters consist of Ryu, Ken, Chun-Li, Guile, Dhalsim, Blanka, Abel and M. Bison. In an update, two more characters were added: Zangief and Cammy. The most recent update features Sagat and an unlockable character, Dee Jay.

=== Windows version additions ===
The Windows version of Street Fighter IV includes all the features found in the PlayStation 3 and Xbox 360 and some extras, that Capcom representatives say could make it "the definitive version" of the game. The game features online play via Games for Windows – Live, with built-in voice chat and PC-exclusive achievements, but no cross-platform playability would be available with Xbox 360 players. Also, the game features higher resolutions, and three new freely selectable visual styles, named "Ink", "Watercolor" and "Posterize". There are also two bundles of the game: regular (game only, $39.99) and a bundle that includes the Mad Catz FightPad (with the Ryu design) that is currently sold separately for the Xbox 360 version. Those who pre-ordered the game at Best Buy received a DVD with an Eagle One animated comic (this is not the same as The Ties That Bind that comes in the collector's editions of the console versions). Additionally, Svensson has stated on the Capcom Unity forums that the retail version uses disc-based SecuROM as its main form of copy protection for the North American release. The specifications for the game were released on May 15, 2009, and are considered relatively modest.

=== Benchmark version ===
There was also a benchmark version of the game that you could download to test whether your computer would be able to run it properly before purchasing the full game. The benchmark version boots into a menu similar to the actual release of the game, but with a few slight changes. The menu has an option called 'Loop Mode'. Which, judging from the name, loops the benchmark over and over again (assuming it's for commercial use). You can turn the mode on or off from the switch next to the option. The 'Start' option is replaced with 'Start Benchmark'. The PC Settings and Quit options are still there for either to change the settings of the game or to quit the program. The background is more stylized and the word 'Benchmark' has been put right next to the game title. At the end of the benchmark, you're given a run down of your test results, and a score to determine if your computer can run it or not. It's extremely similar to the Benchmark option in the Windows version of the game.

=== Marketing ===
For Western markets, three different packages for the game were prepared—the European release, the North American standard package and the North American Collector's Edition. The contents of the Collector's Edition are nearly identical to those featured in the European version, and are the following:

- A comic book style mini strategy guide by Prima (which also published a full strategy guide for the game in the U.S.), featuring artwork by UDON.
- A disc including the 65-minute animated film titled Street Fighter IV: The Ties That Bind (新たなる絆, Aratanaru Kizuna), produced by Studio 4°C as a prologue for the game, and a selection of the game's trailers (a Blu-ray disc for the PS3 version and game disc with the movie in 720p for the Xbox 360).
- A soundtrack CD (not in Europe).
- Crimson Viper and Ryu figurines (in the US release, PS3 owners got a Ryu figurine, while Xbox 360 owners got a Crimson Viper figure. In Europe, PS3 and Xbox 360 owners got both figurines in place of a soundtrack CD.)
- Five downloadable character costumes, which is known as the Brawler Pack that included alternate costumes for: Zangief, E. Honda, Rufus, El Fuerte and Abel.

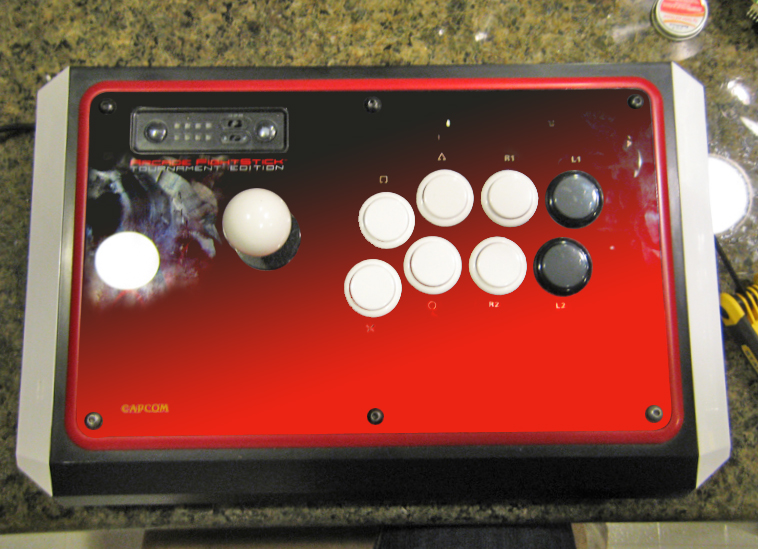
Street Fighter IV dedicated arcade stick with eight action buttons

Mad Catz produced six controllers for the game, two Arcade sticks and a game pad each for the PlayStation 3 and Xbox 360. These products include a basic model joystick, the "Street Fighter IV FightStick"; a heavier and sturdier stick, the "Street Fighter IV FightStick Tournament Edition'; and a six-button game pad, the "Street Fighter IV FightPad". Meanwhile, peripheral manufacturer Hori also produced two joysticks for the game for the Japanese/Asian markets based on previous joystick models produced by the company.

=== iOS version ===
An iOS version of the game was released on March 10, 2010. This, and subsequent mobile versions, retained many of the console version's features, but contained a simplified combo system and replaced the original game's 3D polygonal fighter models with 2D pre-rendered sprites. Additionally, the game also included Bluetooth multiplayer and Game Center achievements, and was released with eight playable characters, though more have been added through free updates. This version is no longer available to download on the iOS store.

Later a version called Street Fighter IV Volt was released for the iPhone and iPod Touch on June 30, 2011, which enabled online play. Another version called Street Fighter IV: Champion Edition was released on July 12, 2017, which featured updated graphics and adds Poison, Ibuki and Dudley to the roster, increasing the total number of playable fighters to 25. An additional six fighters (Gouken, Rose, Elena, Juri, Guy and Evil Ryu) were later added into the roster through free updates.

=== Android version ===
On January 5, 2012, a version of the game called Street Fighter IV HD was released for LG's Android-powered Nitro HD and Optimus LTE phones. On December 30, 2012, the exclusivity was dropped and the game was re-released on Google Play, this time titled Street Fighter IV, with a region restriction in place that makes it available only in Japan. On February 21, 2018, an Android port of Street Fighter IV: Champion Edition was made available worldwide on Google Play. This version contained 32 playable characters, including Dan as a platform exclusive. This version of the game has had one million installs.

=== Downloadable content ===
The console versions of Street Fighter IV support downloadable content (DLC), made available for download via Microsoft's Xbox Live Marketplace and Sony's PlayStation Network.

The first expansion pack, titled "Championship Mode", was released free of charge on April 24, 2009. It provides players with a replay mode, a new points system and an enhanced tournament matching system. Championship mode is a game mode where a series of players compete against each other for ranking points. The higher the ranking, the harder the contest the player will participate in. The PlayStation 3 version of the download allows the player to vote on the parts of the recorded match they thought were "funny", "awesome", and "beautiful". The Xbox 360 version allows the player to download their recorded fights to the console.

Additionally, five alternate costume packs are available for purchase. These costume packs include the alternate costumes already seen in the arcade version, and were released on separate dates following the game's launch. A single package called the "Complete Alternate Costume Pack", containing alternate costumes for all 25 characters was made available for download on May 5, 2009, in North America, and May 8, 2009, in Europe.

- February 17, 2009 (North America); February 20, 2009 (Europe): Brawler Pack including alternate costumes for: Zangief, E. Honda, Rufus, El Fuerte and Abel.
- February 24, 2009 (North America); February 27, 2009 (Europe): Femme Fatale Pack including alternate costumes for: Chun-Li, Cammy, Sakura, Rose and C. Viper.
- March 3, 2009 (North America); March 6, 2009 (Europe): Shoryuken Pack including alternate costumes for: Ryu, Ken, Akuma, Gouken and Dan.
- March 10, 2009 (North America); March 13, 2009 (Europe): Shadaloo Pack including alternate costumes for: Seth, M. Bison, Sagat, Balrog and Vega.
- March 17, 2009 (North America); March 20, 2009 (Europe): Classic Pack including alternate costumes for: Guile, Dhalsim, Fei-Long, Blanka and Gen.

Although initially Capcom stated that there were no plans to add any additional characters to the game, wanting to focus on core gameplay values, Yoshinori Ono later revealed that unfinished versions of Dee Jay and T. Hawk (the only two missing characters from SSF2T) had been made, and given sufficient fan request for them, they could eventually get added into the game. These characters eventually found their way into Super Street Fighter IV.

There was an update for the iOS version that added Zangief and Cammy to the roster. A second update added C. Viper and E. Honda whilst a third added Sagat and Dee Jay—the latter having to be unlocked. DLC is also available. So far, Ryu and Chun-Li each have one new costume each. Additional music, "Street Fighter II Arranged BGM", can also be purchased to provide alternate in-game audio.

== Related media ==
=== Anime ===
Street Fighter IV: The Ties That Bind is an animated movie directed by Jirō Kanai that was featured in a bonus disc included in the Collector's Edition of Street Fighter IV for the PlayStation 3 and Xbox 360. The plot, which takes place before the events of Street Fighter IV, begins with Cammy's Team Delta Red task force who are investigating an energy anomaly. At the same time, Chun-Li and Guile investigate the disappearance of well-known martial artists. Meanwhile, Crimson Viper is sent to capture Ryu on orders from Seth, who knows about Ryu's Satsui no Hadou and desires it for himself.

Additionally, four promotional anime shorts featuring characters from the game were released.

=== Comic ===
In addition to The Ties That Bind animated film included with the collectors edition of the game, UDON also published a four-issue comic mini-series based on Street Fighter IV, with the first issue being released February 18, 2009. The comic focuses on the new characters (Abel, Viper, El Fuerte and Rufus) and their interactions with many of the series' mainstays.

=== PlayStation Home ===
In the PlayStation 3's online community-based service PlayStation Home, Capcom has released a Street Fighter IV themed game space called "S.I.N.'s Secret Base from Street Fighter IV". It has such features as Challenge Opponent which lets users do an action based on their fighting level in Street Fighter IV, as well as a shop with themed costumes and ornaments of all the characters from Street Fighter IV. This space was released in the Japanese version on July 30, 2009, in the Asian version on September 24, 2009, in the European version on October 9, 2009, and in the North American version on October 23, 2009. In addition to the game space, costumes and ornaments, Street Fighter IV also fully supported Game Launching in PlayStation Home which let users set up multi-player games in Home, with advanced options, and launch into the game from Home. This feature was added on April 23, 2009. Some trophies in Street Fighter IV also rewarded Home rewards.

=== Pachislot Edition ===
On October 12, 2011, Enterrise released a pachislot version of the game in Japan. This version features all of the characters from the console release. The player plays as Ryu in the game's story, although other characters such as Ken or Chun-Li can only be played at certain points in the game. New to this version are 3D overworld segments where Ryu travels through some of the game's stages and destinations. The battle segments also return in this version, but unlike the arcade and console versions, the pachislot version's battle segments are now turn-based (similar to Pokémon Stadium, its sequel and Pokémon Battle Revolution). The Reg Bonus in this game features a new door-opening bonus stage that didn't make it into the arcade and console versions of Street Fighter IV and its updated versions. A sequel based on SSFIV: Arcade Edition was released on March 22, 2016.

== Reception ==
Reception

Aggregate score
Aggregator	Score
Metacritic	PS3: 94/100; X360: 93/100; PC: 91/100 iOS: 84/100 iOS: (Volt): 80/100; PS3 (Ultra): 83/100; X360 (Ultra): 84/100; PC (Ultra): 82/100; PS4 (Ultra): 71/100 iOS (Champion Edition): 67/100

Review scores
Publication	Score
1Up.com	A
Eurogamer	10/10
Famitsu	34/40; 36/40 (Ultra)
Game Informer	PS3/X360: 9.25/10
GameSpot	9.0/10
GameTrailers	9.2/10
IGN	9.3/10
Play	95%
TouchArcade	iOS: 4.5/5 iOS (Volt): 4.5/5 iOS (Champion Edition): 4.5/5
X-Play	5/5

Awards
Publication	Award
Golden Joystick Awards	Fighting Game of the Year
Game Critics Awards	Best Fighting Game of 2008
Academy of Interactive Arts & Sciences	Fighting Game of the Year (2010)

Both the home versions of Street Fighter IV have received an aggregate rating of "universal acclaim" from Metacritic based on the reviews of critics. The game received an aggregated score of 94 out of 100 from Metacritic for its PlayStation 3 version, 93 out of 100 for its Xbox 360 version, and 91 out of 100 for its Microsoft Windows version.

The arcade version of Street Fighter IV was voted Best Game of 2008 in Japan by the editorial staff of Arcadia magazine in the February 2009 issue of the publication. The game also won in the categories of "Best Graphics", "Best Production", and the "Reader's Choice Award". The character Ryu took the No. 1 spot in the magazine's "Top 20 Characters of 2008" in the same issue. The February 2009 issue of PlayStation: The Official Magazine has rated the game 5/5, while the February 2009 issue of the Official Xbox Magazine has given Street Fighter IV a score of 9.5/10. IGN gave the game a 9.3/10, calling it an "irrevocably deep fighting game", but said that the anime cutscenes are "so poorly animated and tell you almost nothing about the story or the context for each character's participation in the tournament." GameSpot gave it the best Fighting Game of 2009 in the Editor's Choice and Reader's Choice areas. Additionally, GameTrailers named the title as the Best Fighting Game of 2009. Street Fighter IV also won "Fighting Game of the Year" at the 2009 Spike Video Game Awards. During the 13th Annual Interactive Achievement Awards, the Academy of Interactive Arts & Sciences awarded Street Fighter IV with "Fighting Game of the Year".

Giant Bomb gave the game five out of five stars, stating that "Street Fighter IV combines old and new in powerful ways, resulting in a game familiar enough to bring retired fans back into the fold while being different enough to appeal to the players who have stuck with the genre since day one." Eurogamer gave the game 10/10 stating that "after over a month of playing Street Fighter IV almost daily, what has become quite clear is that it manages to appeal to a huge range of abilities and tastes without ever compromising its fidelity".

The iOS version has been critically acclaimed as well. Gameplayershub.com gave the game a 97% score, indicating that the game had such polish it should lead the way for future games on the platform.

Edge ranked the game #14 on its list of "The 100 Best Games To Play Today", stating, "SFIV opens up the genre to all-comers without ever compromising the system's depth or fidelity." In the 2017 version of their all-time top 100, Ultra Street Fighter IV was the only fighting game on the list.

=== Sales ===
The game topped the multi-format charts and set sales records in the UK, with 53% of sales being on the PS3. It was also one of the most rented games of 2009. By March 31, 2009, Street Fighter IV had sold over 2.5 million copies worldwide. As of December 2024, Street Fighter IV has sold over ten million copies across all versions, making it the second highest selling title in the series behind Street Fighter II.

Title	Year	Platform(s)	Software sales			Sales revenue (est.)	
Title	Year	Platform(s)	Worldwide	Japan	Overseas (est.)	Japan	Overseas
Street Fighter IV	2009	PS3, X360	3,600,000	210,641	3,389,359	¥1,851,323,749	$209,873,335
Street Fighter IV	2009	Steam	109,113 (est.)	—N/a	109,113	—N/a	$209,873,335
Super Street Fighter IV	2010	PS3, X360	1,900,000	202,486	1,697,514	¥1,058,596,808	$67,883,585
Super Street Fighter IV: Arcade Edition	2011	PS3, X360	1,200,000	165,455	1,034,545	¥691,601,900	$41,381,800
Super Street Fighter IV: 3D Edition	2011	3DS	1,300,000	150,162	1,149,838	¥755,164,698	$45,982,022
Ultra Street Fighter IV	2014	PS3, X360, PC	2,200,000	81,661	2,118,339	¥358,410,129	$84,712,377
Total			10,309,113 (est.)	810,405	9,498,708	¥4,715,097,284 ($57,984,598)	$401,843,119

== Updated versions ==
Versions of Street Fighter IV by platform
Game	Release Year	Characters	Arcade	PS3/X360	PC	3DS	PS4
Street Fighter IV	2008	19	Yes	No	No	No	No
Street Fighter IV (home release)	2009	25	No	Yes	Yes	No	No
Super Street Fighter IV	2010	35	No	Yes	No	No	No
Super Street Fighter IV: Arcade Edition	2010	39	Yes	Yes	Yes	No	No
Super Street Fighter IV: 3D Edition	2011	35	No	No	No	Yes	No
Ultra Street Fighter IV	2014	44	Yes	Yes	Yes	No	Yes

=== Super Street Fighter IV ===
Released on April 27, 2010, Super Street Fighter IV is the first major update to Street Fighter IV. Super Street Fighter IV includes several new online game modes, five new stages, a new announcer and ten additional characters, as well as tweaks and changes to the existing ones, such as new Ultra Combos and additional costumes. Among the added characters are returners T. Hawk, Dee Jay, Adon, Guy, Cody, Ibuki, Makoto, and Dudley. The newly introduced characters are Juri, a Korean taekwondo fighter who works as a spy for Seth's organization, S.I.N., and Hakan, a Turkish oil wrestler. The game also featured new intros and endings for all characters from previous installment.

The game was originally released for the PlayStation 3 and Xbox 360, later getting an arcade version with extended content. The arcade version was later backported to consoles in the form of Super Street Fighter IV: Arcade Edition. A handheld version of Super Street Fighter IV, titled Super Street Fighter IV: 3D Edition, was also released for the Nintendo 3DS in March 2011, including stereoscopic 3D graphics and new features.

=== Super Street Fighter IV: Arcade Edition ===
An arcade version of Super Street Fighter IV was released by Capcom in December 2010, titled Super Street Fighter IV: Arcade Edition. Arcade Edition added Yun, Yang, Evil Ryu and Oni to the roster, as well as changes to the existing characters. The Arcade Edition was later released as both a standalone game and as a downloadable update. In late 2011, a free balance update patch called Version 2012 was released.

=== Ultra Street Fighter IV ===
A new update called Ultra Street Fighter IV (ウルトラストリートファイターIV) was announced for release in early 2014 at the 2013 Evolution Championship Series. Before the release of the game, Capcom set up test locations to gather fan feedback that was taken into account for the final product. The game was released in Japanese arcades in April 2014, later being distributed for home platforms as both a paid downloadable update for Super Street Fighter IV and Super Street Fighter IV: Arcade Edition, and as a standalone retail game. The update version for Xbox 360 and PlayStation 3 was released on June 3, 2014, with the full retail versions to follow on August 5. The PC versions (both digital and retail) were released on August 8, the PC port being delayed to get the console versions ready in time for the 2014 Evolution Championship Series. The PC version of Ultra Street Fighter IV was the first game in the series to use Steam from day one, following the discontinuation of Games for Windows – Live.

The update introduces six new stages and five new characters: Rolento, Elena, Hugo and Poison (all four of whom had been featured in Street Fighter X Tekken), in addition to Decapre, a member of M. Bison's Dolls, who makes her first playable appearance in the series as a sub-boss. Despite some of the new characters having been recently featured in X Tekken, their gameplay mechanics are substantially different in order to match the game's pace. This brings the total number of fighters to 44. The game also adds a feature called "Edition Select" which, similarly to Hyper Street Fighter II, allows players to select different versions of characters, based on their properties in past Street Fighter IV iterations. The update also adds an "Ultra Combo W" option, which makes both of the character's Ultra Combos available simultaneously, at the cost of them doing reduced damage.

Alongside the usual balance changes, the update introduces some new fighting mechanics. The first is a new move called Red Focus, similar to the regular Focus move, but having more invincibility hits. Also new is a "delayed wakeup" technique, which allows a knocked-down player to slightly lengthen the time before the character gets back up. Finally, based on fan feedback, the update removes most unblockable setups.

On September 21, 2014, it was announced that Ultra Street Fighter IV was getting a free DLC pack due for release in October, which, among other things, adds a new Omega variation to the characters, which gives them new moves and properties. For the PC version of the game, improvements were also expected in the online play experience. This download was finally released on December 15, 2014.

On December 6, 2014, it was announced at the PlayStation Experience that Ultra Street Fighter IV would be ported to PlayStation 4 by Other Ocean Interactive; the game was released digitally on May 26, 2015. The port became noted for containing a large number of bugs and glitches; while the PS4 port was originally scheduled to be used at EVO 2015, it was later announced that the tournament would revert to using the Xbox 360 version. On July 18, 2015, the Steam port of the game was free to play (until the next day) in celebration of EVO 2015. Around the time of EVO 2015, Capcom's Peter "Combofiend" Rosas mentioned in a blog that Capcom and Sony have come to a statement that the PS4 port is now the definitive version. He stated that all major issues with the port have been resolved as well as the input lag being on par with the Xbox 360 port. Regarding Capcom Pro Tour events, all Western Capcom Pro Tour events would be migrating over to the PS4 port starting with VSFighting 5. He mentioned that Asian events will continue to use the PS3 port until the PS4 version's release.

During the 18th Annual D.I.C.E. Awards, the Academy of Interactive Arts & Sciences nominated Ultra Street Fighter IV for "Fighting Game of the Year".

In May 2018, Ultra Street Fighter IV was included as a pre-order digital bonus with Street Fighter 30th Anniversary Collection, giving a total of 13 games in the original timeline of the series.
