= Street Fighter III: 2nd Impact =

1997 video game

- European arcade flyer
- Developer: Capcom
- Publishers: Arcade; Capcom; Dreamcast: JP/NA: Capcom; PAL: Virgin Interactive
- Composer: Hideki Okugawa
- Series: Street Fighter
- Platforms: Arcade, Dreamcast
- Release: Arcade: WW: September 30, 1997; JP: October 18, 1997; Dreamcast: JP: December 16, 1999; NA: June 20, 2000; EU: September 15, 2000
- Genre: Fighting
- Modes: Single-player, multiplayer
- Arcade system: CP System III

Street Fighter III: 2nd Impact - Giant Attack (ストリートファイターIII セカンドインパクト ジャイアントアタック, Sutorīto Faitā III Sekando Inpakuto Jaianto Atakku) is a 1997 fighting game developed and published by Capcom for arcades. It is an update of Street Fighter III: New Generation; like its predecessor, it runs on the CP System III hardware. 2nd Impact introduced new gameplay mechanics, new characters, and new special moves. The game also brings back bonus rounds, not seen in the series since Super Street Fighter II. It is also the only CPS-3 title to have a widescreen feature.

2nd Impact was released in a two-in-one compilation for the Dreamcast titled Street Fighter III: Double Impact, which also included the original Street Fighter III. It was included in the Street Fighter 30th Anniversary Collection for PlayStation 4, Xbox One, Nintendo Switch and PC. 2nd Impact was followed in the arcades by Street Fighter III: 3rd Strike - Fight for the Future.

== Gameplay ==
Ryu vs. Ken in 2nd Impact

Released in October 1997, the second installment of Street Fighter III brought back all the characters from the first game and introduced two new ones: Hugo and Urien. Yun and Yang from the first game also became separate characters, with Yang receiving his unique set of Special Moves and Super Arts to distinguish him from Yun. Recurring hidden character Akuma also returned as a secret computer-controlled challenger and selectable character. Thus the playable character roster increased to 14. In addition to the regular Akuma, a computer-controlled version named "Shin Akuma" also appears in the single-player mode.

In addition to Super Arts, the player can also perform slightly more powerful versions of their Special Moves called EX Specials. By using a certain portion of Super Art gauge (after gaining certain amount of gauge), the player can perform an EX Special version of a regular Special Move by inputting the command and pressing two attack buttons of the same type (such as two punch buttons) instead of one. Super Meter length is changed from previous game. Frame data has changed, some characters gained new moves, and some animations are improved. Other new abilities added to the game are "tech throw", the ability to escape from a throwing attack, and "personal action", a character-specific taunt. Each character's personal action is also accompanied by an additional benefit if completed successfully; for example, Ryu's lowers his stun gauge. If a second-player interrupts the gameplay to challenge the other player, then the first player will be allowed to change the Super Art of their selected character.

The single-player mode was changed slightly from the first game. The player faces against series of eight opponents, including a character-specific final opponent, who will exchange dialogue with the player's character before the match. If certain requirements are met, then the player will also face a rival character during the course of the single-player mode and exchange dialogue before a match. If certain other requirements are met, the player will also face against the CPU-controlled Akuma instead of the character's usual final opponent in the single-player mode and depending on the player's performance in their fight against Akuma, then a match against a more powerful version of Akuma known as Shin Akuma will also take place. 2nd Impact brings back the concept of bonus rounds, which was last seen in Super Street Fighter II. At the end of the third CPU match, then the player will participate in a minigame dubbed "Parry the Ball", in which the player can practice their parrying skills against a series of basketballs thrown towards the player by Sean.

== Characters ==
The cast from the original Street Fighter III returned. The twin brothers Yun and Yang, who had identical move sets in the previous game, were given different special moves, properties, and Super Arts in 2nd Impact, officially making them separate characters.

- Akuma (Gouki in Japan) - Appears in 2nd Impact as a secret character and has a non-playable "Shin Akuma" version which can be selected in the Dreamcast version of the game in Double Impact. Voiced by Tomomichi Nishimura who would go on to reprise his role for 3rd Strike.
- Hugo - A professional wrestler from Germany who seeks a strong tag team partner for an upcoming tournament. He is often accompanied by his manager, Poison. Hugo is based on Andore, an enemy character from Final Fight, who in turn was modeled after professional wrestler André the Giant. Hugo was planned to be in the first game, as evidenced by his mobile character with unfinished sprites, and the presence of his stage in New Generation. Voiced by Wataru Takagi in 2nd Impact and Len Carlson in 3rd Strike.
- Urien - Gill's younger brother, who seeks to usurp his brother's leadership as "President" of their organization. He can manipulate electricity and metal. Voiced by Yuji Ueda in 2nd Impact and Lawrence Bayne in 3rd Strike.

== Home version ==
Reception

Aggregate scores
Aggregator	Score
GameRankings	79.70%
Metacritic	84%

Review scores
Publication	Score
Electronic Gaming Monthly	8/10
GameFan	90%
GamePro	80%
GameRevolution	75%
GameSpot	72%
IGN	88%

=== Features ===
In 1999, Capcom released Street Fighter III: Double Impact (Street Fighter III: W Impact in Japan) for the Dreamcast, a compilation containing the original game and 2nd Impact. The compilation features an Arcade, Versus, Training and Option Mode for both games, as well as a "Parry Attack Mode" in 2nd Impact, where the player gets to test their parrying skills in the game's bonus round. This compilation also allows players to use Gill (in both games) and Shin Akuma (in 2nd Impact only), who were exclusively computer-controlled characters in the arcade version.

In May 2018, 2nd Impact was re-released as an emulation-style arcade perfect featured game as part of the Street Fighter 30th Anniversary Collection developed for the PlayStation 4, Xbox One, Steam, and Nintendo Switch. With save states, the game can be continued from save points by the player.

=== Reception ===
In Japan, Game Machine listed Street Fighter III: 2nd Impact on their December 1, 1997 issue as being the third most-successful arcade game of the year.

IGN said that Alpha 3 "wins hands down in all senses." CNET said that the game was "only for purists", with GamePro in agreement, saying "Hardcore fans are going to be on automatic and get it right away, but it's a tough situation for the average fighting fan." Daily Radar said that it "doesn't have all the bells and whistles that other SF titles have, but its fighting engine is so clean and deep that it is a joy to play for old schoolers."

== Music ==
The themes for the games are predominantly drum and bass, with some jazz, hip-hop and techno elements. While Yuki Iwai worked on the soundtracks for New Generation and 2nd Impact, Hideki Okugawa worked on all three games. The soundtrack to the first game in the series was released on CD by First Smile Entertainment in 1997, while the 3rd Strike original soundtrack was released by Mars Colony Music in 2000, with an arranged version afterwards.

== Sources ==
- Studio Bent Stuff (Sep 2000). All About Capcom Head-to-Head Fighting Games 1987-2000. A.A. Game History Series (Vol. 1) (in Japanese). Dempa Publications, Inc. ISBN 4-88554-676-1.
