= Resident Evil 5 =

2009 video game

- Developer: Capcom (Note: Mercenary Technology developed the Windows version and Nvidia Lightspeed Studios developed the Shield Android TV version.)
- Publisher: Capcom
- Directors: Yasuhiro Anpo; Kenichi Ueda
- Producers: Jun Takeuchi; Masachika Kawata
- Designer: Jiro Taoka
- Programmer: Soji Seta
- Writers: Haruo Murata; Yoshiaki Hirabayashi; Kenichi Ueda
- Composers: Kota Suzuki; Hideki Okugawa; Akihiko Narita; Seiko Kobuchi
- Series: Resident Evil
- Engine: MT Framework
- Platforms: PlayStation 3; Xbox 360; Windows; Shield Android TV; PlayStation 4; Xbox One; Nintendo Switch
- Release: March 5, 2009: PlayStation 3, Xbox 360; JP: March 5, 2009; AU: March 12, 2009; NA: March 13, 2009; EU: March 13, 2009 Gold Edition; JP: February 18, 2010 (PS3); NA: March 9, 2010; AU: March 11, 2010; EU: March 12, 2010 Windows; JP: September 17, 2009; AU: September 17, 2009; NA: September 18, 2009; EU: September 18, 2009 Gold Edition; WW: March 26, 2015 Shield Android TV; WW: May 19, 2016 PlayStation 4, Xbox One; WW: June 28, 2016 Nintendo Switch; WW: October 29, 2019
- Genre: Third-person shooter
- Modes: Single-player, multiplayer

Resident Evil 5 (Note: Known in Japan as Biohazard 5 (Japanese: バイオハザード5, Hepburn: Baiohazādo Faibu)) is a 2009 third-person shooter game developed and published by Capcom. It was released for the PlayStation 3 and Xbox 360 consoles in March 2009 and for Windows in September 2009. It was rereleased for PlayStation 4 and Xbox One in June 2016.

The plot involves an investigation of a terrorist threat by Chris Redfield and Sheva Alomar in Kijuju, a fictional region of West Africa. Chris learns that he must confront his past in the form of an old enemy, Albert Wesker, and his former partner, Jill Valentine.

The gameplay is similar to Resident Evil 4 (2005), though it is the first in the series designed for two-player cooperative gameplay. It was considered the first main Resident Evil game to depart from the survival horror genre, with critics saying it bore more resemblance to an action game. Motion capture was used for the cutscenes. Several staff members from the original Resident Evil worked on Resident Evil 5. The Windows version was developed by Mercenary Technology.

Resident Evil 5 received positive reviews, despite some criticism for its control scheme. It received divided opinions on whether aspects of it were racist; an investigation by the British Board of Film Classification found the complaints were unsubstantiated. Resident Evil 5 was the best-selling Capcom game until 2018, when it was outsold by Monster Hunter: World, and the best-selling Resident Evil game until the Resident Evil 2 remake (2019).

== Gameplay ==
The first player controls Chris Redfield, while a second player can control Sheva Alomar. Players are controlled from an over-the-shoulder perspective.

Resident Evil 5 is a third-person shooter with an over-the-shoulder perspective. Players can use several weapons including handguns, shotguns, automatic rifles, sniper rifles, and grenade launchers, as well as melee attacks. Players can make quick 180-degree turns to evade enemies. Many boss battles contain quick time events.

As with Resident Evil 4, players can upgrade weapons with money and treasure collected in-game and heal themselves with herbs, but cannot run and shoot at the same time. New features include infected enemies with guns and grenades, the ability to upgrade weapons at any time from the inventory screen without having to find a merchant, and the equipping of weapons and items in real-time during gameplay. Each player can store nine items. Unlike the previous games, the item size is irrelevant; a herb or a grenade launcher each occupy one space, and four items may be assigned to the D-pad. The game features puzzles, though fewer than previous games.

Resident Evil 5 is the first Resident Evil game designed for two-player cooperative gameplay. The player controls Chris, a former member of the fictional Special Tactics and Rescue Service (STARS) and member of the BSAA, and a second player can control Sheva, who is introduced in this game. If a person plays alone, Sheva is controlled by the artificial intelligence (AI). When the game has been completed once, there is an option to make Sheva the primary character. Two-player mode is available online or split screen with a second player using the same console. A second player joining a split screen game in progress will reload the last checkpoint; the second player joining an online game will have to wait until the first player reaches the next checkpoint, or restarts the previous one, to play. In split-screen mode, one player's viewpoint is presented in the top half of the screen, and the other in the bottom half, but each viewpoint is presented in widescreen format, rather than using the full width of the screen, resulting in unused space to the left and right of the two windows. If one player has critical health, only their partner can resuscitate them, and they will die if their partner cannot reach them. At certain points, players are deliberately separated. Players can trade items during gameplay, although weapons cannot be traded with online players. The storyline is linear, and interaction with other characters is mostly limited to cutscenes.

A version of the Mercenaries minigame, which debuted in Resident Evil 3: Nemesis, is included in Resident Evil 5. This minigame places the player in an enclosed environment with a time limit. Customized weapons cannot be used and players must search for weapons, ammunition, and time bonuses while fighting a barrage of enemies, to score as many points as possible within the time limit. The minigame multiplayer mode was initially offline only; a release-day patch needed to be downloaded to access the online multiplayer modes. Mercenaries is unlocked when the story mode is completed.

== Plot ==
In 2009, five years after the events of Resident Evil 4, Chris Redfield, now an agent of the Bioterrorism Security Assessment Alliance (BSAA), is dispatched to Kijuju in West Africa. He and his new partner Sheva Alomar are tasked with apprehending Ricardo Irving before he can sell a bio-organic weapon (BOW) on the black market. When they arrive, they discover that the locals have been infected by the Las Plagas parasite (those infected are called "Majini") and the BSAA Alpha Team have been killed. Chris and Sheva are rescued by BSAA's Delta Team, which includes Sheva's mentor Captain Josh Stone. In Stone's data Chris sees a photograph of Jill Valentine, his old partner, who has been presumed dead after a confrontation with Albert Wesker. Chris, Sheva and Delta Team close in on Irving, but he escapes with the aid of a hooded and masked figure. Irving leaves behind documents that lead Chris and Sheva to marshy oilfields, where Irving's deal is to occur, but they discover that the documents are a diversion. When Chris and Sheva try to regroup with Delta Team, they find the team slaughtered by a BOW: a mutating troll-like giant. Sheva cannot find Stone among the dead. Determined to learn if Jill is still alive, Chris does not report to headquarters and proceeds on their quest.

Continuing through the marsh, they reunite with Stone and track down Irving's boat with his help. Irving injects himself with a variant of the Las Plagas parasite and mutates into a huge octopus-like beast. Chris and Sheva defeat him, and his dying words lead them to a nearby cave. The cave is the source of a flower used to create viruses previously used by the Umbrella Corporation, as well as a new strain named Uroboros. Chris and Sheva find evidence that Tricell, the company funding the BSAA, took over a former Umbrella underground laboratory and continued Umbrella's research. In the facility, they discover thousands of capsules holding human test subjects. Chris finds Jill's capsule, but it is empty. When they leave, they discover that Tricell CEO Excella Gionne has been plotting with Wesker to launch missiles with the Uroboros virus across the globe; it is eventually revealed that Wesker hopes to take a chosen few from the chaos of infection and rule them, creating a new breed of humanity. Chris and Sheva pursue Gionne but are stopped by Wesker and the hooded figure, who is revealed to be a brainwashed Jill. Gionne and Wesker escape to a Tricell oil tanker; Chris and Sheva fight Jill, subduing her and removing the mind-control device before she urges Chris to follow Wesker.

Chris and Sheva board the tanker and encounter Gionne, who escapes after dropping a case of syringes; Sheva keeps several. When Chris and Sheva reach the main deck, Wesker announces over the ship's intercom that he has betrayed Gionne and infected her with Uroboros. She mutates into a giant monster, which Chris and Sheva defeat. Jill radios in, telling Chris and Sheva that Wesker must take precise, regular doses of a serum to maintain his strength and speed; a larger or smaller dose would poison him. Sheva realizes that Gionne's syringes are doses of the drug. Chris and Sheva follow Wesker to a bomber loaded with missiles containing the Uroboros virus, injecting him with the syringes Gionne dropped. Wesker tries to escape on the bomber; Chris and Sheva disable it, making him crash-land in a volcano. Furious‚ Wesker exposes himself to Uroboros and chases Chris and Sheva through the volcano. They fight him, and the weakened Wesker falls into the lava before Chris and Sheva are rescued by a helicopter, which is piloted by Jill and Stone. As a dying Wesker attempts to drag the helicopter into the volcano, Chris and Sheva fire rocket-propelled grenades at Wesker, killing him and the Uroboros. Chris wonders if the world is worth fighting for. Looking at Sheva and Jill, he decides to live in a world without fear.

== Development ==
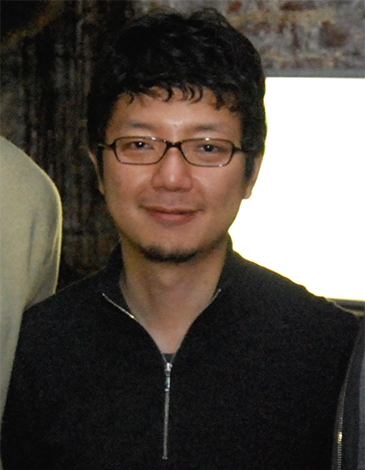
Producer Jun Takeuchi (pictured in 2010) supervised the game's development.

Resident Evil 5 was developed by Capcom and produced by Jun Takeuchi, who directed Onimusha: Warlords and produced Lost Planet: Extreme Condition. Keiji Inafune, promotional producer for Resident Evil 2 and executive producer of the PlayStation 2 version of Resident Evil 4, supervised the project. Production began in 2005 and at its peak, over 100 people were working on the project. In February 2007, some members of Capcom's Clover Studio began working on Resident Evil 5 while others were working on Resident Evil: The Umbrella Chronicles, which debuted for the Wii. Yasuhiro Anpo, who worked as a programmer on the original Resident Evil, directed Resident Evil 5. He was one of several staff members who worked on the original game to be involved in development. The script was written by Haruo Murata and Yoshiaki Hirabayashi, based on a story idea by the concept director Kenichi Ueda. Takeuchi announced that Resident Evil 5 would retain the gameplay model introduced in Resident Evil 4, with "thematic tastes" from both Resident Evil 4 and the original Resident Evil.

While previous Resident Evil games are mainly set at night, the events of Resident Evil 5 occur almost entirely during the day. The decision for this was a combination of the African setting and advances in hardware improvements which allowed increasingly detailed graphics. On the subject of changes to Jill and Chris's appearance, production director Yasuhiro Anpo explained that designers tried "to preserve their image and imagined how they would have changed over the passage of time". Their new designs retained the character's signature colors; green for Chris and blue for Jill. Sheva was redesigned several times during production, though all versions tried to emphasize a combination of "feminine attraction and the strength of a fighting woman". The Majini were designed to be more violent than the "Ganado" enemies in Resident Evil 4.

The decision for cooperative gameplay was made part-way through development, for a new experience in a Resident Evil game. Despite initial concern that a second player would dampen the tension and horror, it was later realized that this could actually increase such factors where one player had to be rescued. The decision to retain wide-screen proportions in two-player mode was made to avoid having the first player's screen directly on top of the second, which might be distracting, and the restriction on simultaneously moving and shooting was retained to increase player tension by not allowing them to maneuver freely. Takeuchi cited the film Black Hawk Down as an influence on the setting of Resident Evil 5 and his experience working on Lost Planet: Extreme Condition as an influence on its development. Asked why it was not being released on the Wii, the most popular gaming console at that time, Takeuchi responded that although that may have been a good decision "from a business perspective", the Wii was not the best choice in terms of power and visual quality.

Resident Evil 5 runs on version 1.4 of Capcom's MT Framework engine and scenes were recorded by motion capture. It used custom-built virtual cameras, which allowed the developers to see character movements in real time as the motion-capture actors recorded. Actors Reuben Langdon, Karen Dyer and Ken Lally portrayed Chris Redfield, Sheva Alomar and Albert Wesker respectively. Dyer also voiced Sheva, while Chris's voice was performed by Roger Craig Smith. Dyer's background training in circus skills helped her win the role of Sheva, as Capcom were searching for someone who could handle the physical skills her motion capture required. She performed her own stunts, and worked in production for over a year, sometimes working 14 hours a day. All of the human character motions were based on motion capture, while the non-human characters were animated by hand.

Kota Suzuki was the principal composer and additional music was contributed by Hideki Okugawa, Akihiko Narita and Seiko Kobuchi. The electronic score includes 15 minutes of orchestral music, recorded at the Newman Scoring Stage of 20th Century Fox Studios in Los Angeles with the 103-piece Hollywood Studio Symphony. Other orchestral music and arrangements were by Wataru Hokoyama, who conducted the orchestra. Capcom recorded in Los Angeles because they wanted a Hollywood-style soundtrack to increase the cinematic value and global interest. Resident Evil 5's soundtrack features an original theme song, "Pray", composed by Suzuki and sung by Oulimata Niang.

== Marketing and release ==
Capcom announced Resident Evil 5 on July 20, 2005, and showed a brief trailer at the Electronic Entertainment Expo (E3) in July 2007. The full E3 trailer became available on the Xbox Live Marketplace and the PlayStation Store that same month. A new trailer debuted on Spike TV's GameTrailers TV in May 2008, and on the GameTrailers website. A game demo was released in Japan on December 5, 2008, for the Xbox 360, in North America and Europe for the Xbox 360 on January 26, 2009, and on February 2 for the PlayStation 3. Worldwide downloads of the demo exceeded four million for the two consoles; over 1.8 million were downloaded between January 26 and 29.

In January 2009, D+PAD Magazine reported that Resident Evil 5 would be released with limited-edition Xbox 360 box art; pictures of the limited-edition box claimed that it would allow two to sixteen players to play offline via System Link. Although Capcom said that their "box art isn't lying", the company did not provide details. Capcom soon issued another statement that the box-art information was incorrect, and System Link could support only two players. Microsoft released a limited-edition red Xbox 360 Elite console which was sold with the game. The package included an exclusive Resident Evil theme for the Xbox 360 Dashboard and a download voucher for Super Street Fighter II Turbo HD Remix from Xbox Live.

Resident Evil 5 was released for PlayStation 3 and Xbox 360 in March 2009, alongside a dedicated Game Space on PlayStation Home. The space, Resident Evil 5 "Studio Lot" (Biohazard 5 "Film Studio" in Japan), had as its theme the in-game location of Kijuju. Its lounge offered Resident Evil 5-related items for sale, events and full game-launching support. Some areas of the space were available only to owners of Resident Evil 5. A Windows version was released in September 2009. This version, using Nvidia's 3D Vision technology through DirectX 10, includes more costumes and a new mode in the Mercenaries minigame. Resident Evil 5 was re-released on PlayStation 4 and Xbox One in June 2016, with a physical disc copy following in America that July. It was also released for Nintendo Switch on October 29, 2019.

== Additional content ==
Shortly before the release of Resident Evil 5, Capcom announced that a competitive multiplayer mode called Versus would be available for download within several weeks. Versus became available for download in Europe and North America on April 7, 2009, through the Xbox Live Marketplace and the PlayStation Store. Versus has two online game types: "Slayers", a point-based game challenging players to kill Majini, and "Survivors", where players hunt each other while dodging and attacking Majini. Both modes can be played by two-player teams. The Windows version of Resident Evil 5 originally did not support downloadable content (DLC).

During Sony's press conference at the 2009 Tokyo Game Show Capcom announced that a special edition, Biohazard 5: Alternative Edition, would be released in Japan for the PlayStation 3 in the spring of 2010. This edition supports the PlayStation Move accessory and includes two new scenarios: "Lost in Nightmares", where Chris Redfield and Jill Valentine infiltrate one of Umbrella Corporation co-founder Oswell E. Spencer's estates in 2006, and "Desperate Escape", where players control Josh Stone and Jill Valentine as they assist Chris and Sheva. It also includes the previously released Versus mode, four new costumes and an alternate Mercenaries mode with eight new playable characters, new items and maps. This edition was released as Resident Evil 5: Gold Edition for the Xbox 360 and PlayStation 3 in North America and Europe, featuring the same content. The Xbox 360 version of Gold Edition came in a DVD with a token allowing free download of all DLC, while the PlayStation 3 version had all of the new content on a single Blu-ray disc and, like Alternative Edition, supports the PlayStation Move accessory with a patch released on September 14, 2010. On November 5, 2012, Resident Evil 5: Gold Edition was placed on the PlayStation Network as a free download for PlayStation Plus users during that month.

As part of the conversion to Steamworks, Gold Edition was released for Windows on March 26, 2015. Owners of Resident Evil 5 from Steam or as a boxed retail Games for Windows – Live can acquire a free Steamworks copy of the base game and purchase the new Gold Edition content. The Steamworks version did not allow the use of Nvidia's 3D Vision technology or fan modifications, though Capcom later confirmed a way to work around these issues. In 2023, an update was released for the Windows version that removed Games for Windows – Live, thus restoring the split screen co-op feature to the game.

== Reception ==
Reception

Aggregate score
Aggregator	Score
Metacritic	PS3: 84/100; X360: 83/100; PC: 86/100; PS4: 69/100; XONE: 75/100; NS: 72/100

Review scores
Publication	Score
1Up.com	B
Edge	7/10
Eurogamer	7/10
Game Informer	9.5/10
GameRevolution	B+
GameSpot	8.5/10
GameSpy	4/5
GameTrailers	9/10
IGN	9.0/10
Official Xbox Magazine (US)	9/10
X-Play	3/5

Resident Evil 5 received generally favourable reviews, according to review aggregator website Metacritic. Reviewers praised the visuals and content. Corey Cohen of Official Xbox Magazine complimented the fast pace, and called the graphics gorgeous. It was praised by Joe Juba and Matt Miller of Game Informer, who said that it had the best graphics of any game to date and that the music and voice acting helped bring the characters to life, and Brian Crecente of Kotaku said it was one of the most visually stunning games he had ever played. Adam Sessler of X-Play said the graphics were exceptional, and Edge praised the gameplay as exhilarating and frantic. For IGN, Ryan Geddes wrote that the game had a surprisingly high replay value, and GameZone's Louis Bedigian said it was "worth playing through twice in one weekend".

Several reviewers considered it to be a departure from the survival horror genre, a decision they lamented. Chris Hudak of GameRevolution considered Resident Evil 5 a "full-on action blockbuster", and Brian Crecente said that about halfway through it "dropp[ed] all pretense of being a survival horror title and unmask[ed] itself as an action shooter title". Kristan Reed of Eurogamer said it "morphs what was a survival horror adventure into a survival horror shooter", and believed that this attempt to appeal to action gamers would upset some of the series' fans.

The game's control scheme was criticized. James Mielke of 1UP.com criticized several inconsistencies, such as only being able to take cover from enemy fire in specific areas. Mielke also criticized its controls, saying that aiming was too slow and noting the inability to strafe away from (or quickly jump back from) enemies. Despite the problems he found it was "still a very fun game". Kristan Reed also had criticism of some controls, such as the speed at which 180-degree turns were performed and difficulty accessing inventory. Joe Juba said that the inability to move and shoot at the same time seemed more "like a cheap and artificial way to increase difficulty than a technique to enhance tension." While praising some aspects of the AI control of Sheva, Ryan Geddes thought that it also had its annoyances, such as its tendency to recklessly expend ammunition and health supplies.

Reception of the downloadable content was favorable. Steven Hopper of GameZone rated the "Lost in Nightmares" DLC eight out of ten, saying that despite the episode's brevity it had high replay value and the addition of new multiplayer elements made it a "worthy investment for fans of the original game." Samuel Claiborn of IGN rated the "Desperate Escape" DLC seven out of ten: "Despite Desperate Escape's well-crafted action sequences, I actually found myself missing the unique vibe of Lost in Nightmares. The dynamic between Jill and Josh isn't particularly thrilling, and the one-liners, banter and endearing kitsch are kept to a minimum."

=== Allegations of racism ===
Resident Evil 5's 2007 E3 trailer was criticized for depicting a white protagonist killing black enemies in a small African village. According to Newsweek editor N'Gai Croal, "There was a lot of imagery in that trailer that dovetailed with classic racist imagery", although he acknowledged that only the preview had been released. Takeuchi said the producers were completely surprised by the complaints. The second trailer, released on May 31, 2008, revealed a more racially diverse group of enemies and the African BSAA agent Sheva, who assists the protagonist. Critics felt that Sheva's character was added to address the issue of racism, though Karen Dyer said the character had been in development before the first trailer was released. Takeuchi denied that complaints about racism had any effect in altering the design of Resident Evil 5. He acknowledged that different cultures may have had differing opinions about the trailer, though said he did not expect there to be further complaints once the game was released and people were able to play it. In a Computer and Video Games interview, producer Masachika Kawata said: "We can't please everyone. We're in the entertainment business—we're not here to state our political opinion or anything like that. It's unfortunate that some people felt that way."

In Eurogamer's February 2009 preview of Resident Evil 5, Dan Whitehead expressed concern it might become a video game controversy, stating: "It plays so blatantly into the old clichés of the dangerous 'dark continent' and the primitive lust of its inhabitants that you'd swear the game was written in the 1920s". Whitehead said that these issues became more "outrageous and outdated" as the game progressed and that the addition of the "light-skinned" Sheva just made the overall issue worse. Hilary Goldstein from IGN believed Resident Evil 5 was not deliberately racist, and though he did not personally find it offensive, he felt that others would due to the subjective nature of offensiveness. Chris Hudak dismissed any allegations of racism as "stupid". Karen Dyer, who is of Jamaican descent, also dismissed the claims. She said that in over a year of working on the development she never encountered anything racially insensitive, and would not have continued work if she had.

Wesley Yin-Poole of VideoGamer.com asked Glenn Bowman, senior lecturer in social anthropology at the University of Kent, whether he thought Resident Evil 5 was racist. Bowman considered the racism accusations "silly", saying that it had an anti-colonial theme and those complaining about racism might be expressing an "inverted racism which says that you can't have scary people who are black". It was reported that one cutscene showed "black men" dragging off a screaming white woman; according to Yin-Poole, the allegation was incorrect and the single man dragging the woman was "not obviously black". The scene was submitted to the British Board of Film Classification (BBFC) for evaluation. The BBFC head of communications, Sue Clark said, "There is only one man pulling the blonde woman in from the balcony [and he] is not black either. As the whole game is set in Africa it is hardly surprising that some of the characters are black ... we do take racism very seriously, but in this case, there is no issue around racism."

Writing for The Philosophy of Computer Games Conference in 2015, Harrer and Pichlmair considered Resident Evil 5 "yet another moment in the history of commodity racism, which from the late 19th century onwards allowed popular depictions of racial stereotypes to enter the most intimate spaces of European homes". The authors state that Africa is presented from a Western gaze; "what is presented as 'authentic' blackness conforms to the projected fantasy of predominantly white gaming audience". In 2016, Paul Martin from Games and Culture said that the game's theme could be described as "dark continent", stating it drew on imagery of European colonialism and depictions of "blackness" reminiscent of 19th-century European theories on race.

=== Sales ===
The PlayStation 3 version of Resident Evil 5 was the top-selling game in Japan in the two weeks following its release, with 319,590 copies sold. In March 2009, it became the fastest-selling game of the franchise in the United Kingdom, and the biggest Xbox 360 and PlayStation 3 game release in the country. By September 2025, Resident Evil 5 had sold 9.9 million units worldwide on PlayStation 3 and Xbox 360 with its original release. The Gold Edition had sold an additional 2.4 million units on PlayStation 3 and Xbox 360. The PlayStation 4 and Xbox One versions sold another 3.8 million units combined, bringing the total sales to 16.1 million units.

The original release of Resident Evil 5 was Capcom's best-selling individual edition of a game until March 2018, when Monster Hunter: World's sales reached 7.5 million units, compared to 7.3 million for Resident Evil 5 at the time. It was the best-selling Resident Evil game in 2018 with 10.6 million sales across all its editions. In May 2026, Capcom's financial release reported that Resident Evil 5 had sold 19.01 million copies. It was the bestselling Resident Evil game until July 2026, when the Resident Evil 2 remake reached sales of 19.75 million copies.

=== Awards ===
Resident Evil 5 won the "Award of Excellence" at the 2009 Japan Game Awards. It was nominated for both Best Action/Adventure Game and Best Console Game at the 2008 Game Critics Awards, Best Action Game at the 2009 IGN Game of the Year Awards, and Best Sound Editing in Computer Entertainment at the 2010 Golden Reel Awards. It received five nominations at the 2010 Game Audio Network Guild Awards: Audio of the Year, Best Cinematic/Cut-Scene Audio, Best Dialogue, Best Original Vocal Song – Pop (for the theme song "Pray") and Best Use of Multi-Channel Surround in a Game. At the 13th Annual Interactive Achievement Awards, Resident Evil 5 was nominated for Outstanding Achievement in Art Direction and Dyer was nominated for Outstanding Achievement in Character Performance.

== Bibliography ==
- Nicholson, Zy (2009). Resident Evil 5: The Complete Official Guide. London: Piggyback. ISBN 978-1906064419.
