= Sheva Alomar =

Fictional character in the Resident Evil video game series

- Resident Evil character
- Sheva Alomar in Resident Evil 5 (2009)
- First appearance: Resident Evil 5 (2009)
- Created by: Yasuhiro Anpo; Haruo Murata; Yoshiaki Hirabayashi; Kenichi Ueda
- Designed by: Yosuke Yamagata
- Voiced by: Karen Dyer (Resident Evil 5); Kayla Dixon (Dead by Daylight)
- Motion capture: Karen Dyer (Resident Evil 5)

In-universe information
- Origin: Africa

Sheva Alomar (Japanese: シェバ・アローマ, Hepburn: Sheba Arōma) is a character in the Resident Evil survival horror video game series created by the Japanese company Capcom. Introduced in the 2009 video game Resident Evil 5, she is a native African operative of an anti-bioterrorism group and the new partner of the series' veteran Chris Redfield. Sheva is controlled by the game's artificial intelligence (AI) when playing with a single player, and is controlled by a second player in the game's cooperative mode.

Designed to symbolize "the bond of partnership" within the game, the character's physical design was modeled off Australian actress Michelle Van Der Water, while her voice acting and motion capture were performed by American actress Karen Dyer. The character was met with mostly positive reception from video game journalists, who praised her strength and attractiveness, though her AI in-game received mixed to negative reviews. The character's depiction did, however, receive criticism from several sources for adhering to racial and gendered stereotypes. Sheva has not returned for any further installments of the series, though she appears in the 2022 video game Dead by Daylight as an optional playable character.

== Design and portrayal ==
Sheva Alomar's character was designed during the early development phase of Resident Evil 5, with her designer Yosuke Yamagata calling her a "new major protagonist" who symbolizes the theme of "the bonds of partnership". Her face and story background changed several times while she underwent many redesigns and re-imagining as developers searched for the right look to combine the qualities of "feminine attraction" and the "strength of a fighting woman". Rejected concepts for Sheva included her being either a civilian, a guerrilla, or a military commander.

Her character model was based on Australian actress Michelle Van Der Water, but her voice acting and motion capture were performed by American actress Karen Dyer. Dyer, in her first major game role of this kind, went through weeks of firearms training for the job, learning with both hands as Sheva is left-handed. She described her character as more acrobatic and agile than her partner Chris Redfield, and as "very passionate and youthful", adding she had an "emotional attachment" to her mission as she wants to save her people. In Dead by Daylight, she was voiced by Kayla Dixon.

Sheva appears in Resident Evil 5 wearing a form-fitting purple singlet, beige pants and knee-high boots. She also carries a tactical belt and pistol holster, and wears leather forearm guards and traditional African jewellery. Alternate costumes are a staple within the Resident Evil series that let players dress playable characters in "silly, cool, and even embarrassing" outfits; the series also has a reputation for making their alternate costumes for women sexualised. Sheva's alternate costumes are a "Clubbin'" outfit consisting of a gold lamé bikini, micro-miniskirt and blonde wig, and a "Tribal" outfit consisting of a leopard print bikini and tribal body paint.

== Appearances ==
Sheva made her first and only appearance in Resident Evil 5. According to the character's backstory, her parents died when she was eight years old in an apparent factory accident and she was taken in by her uncle. Eventually, Sheva ran away and was found by a truck driver who was part of a rebel militia group. She later joined the group and soon learned that the factory accident her parents had died in was actually a test of a bio-organic weapon (BOW) by the pharmaceutical company Umbrella Corporation. With the help of the local government, Umbrella destroyed Sheva's village and its inhabitants after the test was complete. When Sheva was 15, she was contacted by U.S. operatives to sabotage Umbrella's attempt to sell a BOW. With Sheva's help, the deal was stopped and she was offered a chance to start a new life in America. Sheva accepted, was speaking fluent English within months and enrolled at a university two years later. After graduation, her benefactor recruited her to join the Bioterrorism Security Assessment Alliance (BSAA). While Umbrella had dissolved years before this, Sheva's hatred of Umbrella and others like them led her to join. She was assigned to a unit for eight months of training, in which she excelled and was chosen to become an agent assigned to the BSAA's West African department. When BSAA agent Chris Redfield is sent to intercept a black market BOW sale in the fictional African country Kijuju, Sheva is assigned to be his partner and guide.

In Resident Evil 5, the primary player controls Chris, whom Sheva follows throughout the game as an ally controlled by artificial intelligence (AI). In the game's co-operative gameplay mode, a second player will control Sheva. When the game has been completed once, there is an option to make Sheva the primary character. During the events of the game, Sheva and Chris stop the Tricell corporation, who were continuing Umbrella's work, from infecting the world with a new BOW. In the end, they kill the series' villain Albert Wesker.

Pre-order bonuses for Resident Evil 5 included a sand globe of Sheva and Redfield. Various action figures of the character have been released by the National Entertainment Collectibles Association, Hot Toys, Square Enix, and SomaliCraft. Karen Dyer posed as Alomar for a 2009 calendar she made available to download from her website. In 2022, she appeared in Dead by Daylight as a legendary skin of Jill Valentine. Merchandise featuring Sheva includes action figures.

== Critical reception ==
Reception of Sheva by video game journalists was mostly positive. She was added to several lists that rank characters by their sex appeal. She is also ranked in lists of the best female characters and best characters from Resident Evil, and among the greatest black video game characters of all time. In 2008, GameDaily staff said that though they were yet to play Resident Evil 5, they were "already enamored with its glamorous starlet"; the following year, they cited Alomar as among the strongest female characters in gaming. In 2010, Dave Meikleham of GamesRadar included her partnership with Chris among gaming's "most violent double acts", and PlayStation: The Official Magazine opined she was intelligent and strong in addition to being beautiful, adding that her inclusion was "probably the highlight" of the game and awarding her "Tribal" costume 2009's Outfit of the Year award. GamesRadar's Matt Cundy said that unlike other characters in the series such as Jill Valentine and Ada Wong, Sheva's primary uniform was both less sexualised and more practical for fighting, describing her as "the absolute antithesis of vulnerable ... a walking fortress that is equal parts kick-ass and intimidating feminine sexuality," and Lisa Foiles of The Escapist praised Sheva among other characters for having a hairstyle that is practical for fighting, unlike many video game heroines. In 2021, Ian Walker from Kotaku opined her as the greatest character in the series, lauding the racial diversity she brought and how her "charm" contrasted well with Redfield's "overall gruff nature".

Several reviewers criticized Sheva's AI. IGN's Jesse Schedeen called her a "walking bag of useless", and "just dumb as a rock when it comes to fighting zombies", while Portal Play Game considered her performance to be extremely annoying. Dan Whitehead from Eurogamer described Sheva's abilities as a bit hit-or-miss, saying that in a game where ammunition is scarce it was often frustrating watching her miss her targets. In 2012, PLAY included her among the most unintentionally annoying PlayStation characters, citing the AI issues. Ryan Geddes from IGN was more mixed, describing her performance as fair and saying her limitations were on par with other AI characters at the time, while IGN's Chris Reed included her among the most useful sidekicks in video games, saying that unlike many AI characters, she was quick to offer assistance and skilled at getting out of the way when the player was moving or shooting.

Several sources have criticized Sheva's depiction for adhering to both gender and racial stereotypes. Andre Brock from Games and Culture opined that Sheva was a "videogame equivalent of Pocahontas: a woman of color coerced into 'guiding' White explorers across a foreign land", and also said that her alternate costumes "make it clear that she is window-dressing; a sexualized mule". Feminist media critic Anita Sarkeesian argued that the tribal outfit was particularly disconcerting, as it combined sexualizing a female character "with the racist tradition of exotifying women of color". Writing for the Digital Games Research Association, Hanli Geyser and Pippa Tshabalala noted that the first shot of Sheva in the game is a close up of her buttocks, immediately objectifying and characterising her. Eurogamer's Whitehead asserted that Sheva "neatly fits the approved Hollywood model of the light-skinned black heroine"; Geyser and Tshabalala similarly stated that her skin tone, outfit and job all conform to Western ideals. Writing for The Philosophy of Computer Games Conference, Sabine Harrer and Martin Pichlmair opined that Sheva was given the role of a "decorative side character", also stating that "gendered and racialized hierarchies" exist between Sheva and Chris; Chris's character is placed in charge of Sheva's resources, said to be reminiscent of "an abusive heteronormative relationship".

== Bibliography ==
- Price, James; Nicholson, Zy (2009). Resident Evil 5: The Complete Official Guide. London: Piggyback. ISBN 978-1906064419.
