= Elena (Street Fighter) =

Playable Street Fighter character

- Street Fighter character
- Elena in Street Fighter III: 2nd Impact (1997)
- First game: Street Fighter III (1997)
- Designed by: Akira "Akiman" Yasuda; Hiromi "Mori" Kotobuki (animation)
- Voiced by: English: Karen Dyer (SFXT, USFIV, SF6) (credited as Eva LaDare); Japanese: Kaoru Fujino (SFIII); Mie Midori (SFIII3S); Saki Fujita (SFXT, USFIV, SF6)

In-universe information
- Fighting style: Capoeira
- Origin: Kenya
- Nationality: Kenyan

Elena (Japanese: エレナ) is a character in Capcom's Street Fighter fighting game series who made her first appearance in Street Fighter III: New Generation in 1997. A woman with close direct ties to nature, she is the daughter of a Kenyan tribal leader who travels the world to make friends while attending school abroad. Since her debut, she has since appeared in various other media such as comics and manga. She was later included in Street Fighter IV's third upgrade, Ultra Street Fighter IV, and as part of the "Year 2" downloadable content lineup for 2024's Street Fighter 6. She has been voiced by Karen Dyer in English, and Kaoru Fujino, Mie Midori, and Saki Fujita in Japanese.

Designed by Akira "Akiman" Yasuda with an emphasis on her beauty, Elena has been cited as one of the first black female fighting game characters and the first character in the Street Fighter series from Africa, fighting solely with leg-based attacks using capoeira. Elena has been praised for her beauty and the fluidity of her motion. She has additionally been called one of the series' strongest designs by sources such as Paste magazine. However, the simplicity of her in-game storylines has faced criticism, and her character design was called out as a cultural stereotype even in light of other series characters. Her light skin and straight hair, among other features, were noted as reflecting European standards of beauty rather than African ones.

== Conception and development ==
Some of Elena's Street Fighter III animations were rotoscoped from David Lee Roth's "Just A Gigolo" music video. Kotobuki, a fan of Roth, created the animation while watching the video on a television set.

Designed by Akira "Akiman" Yasuda and animated by Hiromi "Mori" Kotobuki, the concept started with the desire to include a character from Africa in Street Fighter III, and they chose a female character due to the team feeling a male character would be "stern" and they had enough stern characters as is. They felt capoeira was a fitting fighting style for her due to the team associating it with female fighters and their belief that African women had long arms and legs. However, this created a problem, as the development team had no experience with the fighting style and had to resort to any material they could find, namely travel movies.

The development team recognized that while Elena was revealing, she was not actively lewd in her presentation. However when requests from Capcom came to make her sexier, artist Kinu Nishimura drew her character art in New Generation with an emphasis on her behind. As the Street Fighter III series progressed to the third title, 3rd Strike, the developers focused on letting more of her attacks link more fluidly into one another to enhance her gameplay and the visual effect of her fighting style. One idea that was considered was to give her an attack with a spear that had been shown in her earliest concept art. Though this concept was abandoned, the spear itself still appears in her 3rd Strike character portrait.

=== Design ===
Elena stands 183 centimeters tall (6 ft) and has measurements of 83-58-88 cm (33-23-35 in). The team focused on her beauty when creating her, with a design note to give her "plump breasts" and a developer describing her as "Yuki in Africa", referring to Japanese actress Yuki Uchida. Her outfit consists of a white foldover bikini bottom, and a strip of cloth crisscrossing over her breasts and to her neck, exposing her under cleavage. Red, gold and blue bands completely cover her neck, wrists and portions of her biceps and legs. When designing her outfit, they wanted to make her look "misplaced" alongside the other characters, and her attire was meant to contrast against the other Street Fighter III female character at the time, Ibuki. Yasuda struggled a bit with her proportions, in particular positioning her breasts higher on her chest to help offset her long legs.

While later appearances have given her a variety of secondary outfits such as Japanese schoolgirl attire, her primary outfit persisted in every game until Street Fighter 6, where she is included as part of the "Year 2" content update for the game as a downloadable character. Due to game director Takayuki Nakayama wanting the game to have a character that used capoeira while also wanting a character that originated from Africa, her design was revised to portray her as more mature. To that end, her hair is now slightly lengthened and her bangs removed, while her outfit now incorporates white pants with black stripes, a red sash around her neck, and white sandals with a red strap.

== Appearances ==
Elena is a Kenyan tribal princess introduced in the 1997 video game Street Fighter III: New Generation, whose tribe is dedicated to fighting. She fights using capoeira, which she immediately takes a liking to due to its relation to dance. She seeks to travel the world and make new friends, spending some time studying at a Japanese school and befriending a girl named Narumi, who she later invites to visit her family while studying for her doctorate in France. In Street Fighter IV, a precursor to Street Fighter III, her connection to nature alerts her that something is wrong, and her father informs her he has entered her into the Worldwide Fighting Tournament due to his belief the person responsible is associated with the event. After the tournament she reflects on her travels, having made friends with other fighters such as the boxer Dudley and Japanese warrior Akuma, and decides to continue traveling to make more friends with her next destination being Japan. She also appears in Street Fighter 6 as a DLC.

Elena also appears as a downloadable character for Street Fighter X Tekken, in which she convinces Dudley to travel with her and investigate the anomaly at the South Pole known as Pandora. Outside of fighting games, she is an available character in Capcom's mobile game Street Fighter Battle Combination as well as in TOPJOY's mobile roleplaying game Street Fighter: Duel, the latter of which features alternate "Student" and "Summer" versions exclusive to the Chinese version. The SNK vs. Capcom: Card Fighters series features her as an available card, as does GungHo Online Entertainment's mobile game TEPPEN. In physical trading card game media she appears on cards for Versus TCG, a game based on Card Fighters' Clash, and Jasco Games' Universal Fighting System.

All of Elena's attacks in her fighting game appearances are leg-based, with no punches on even her throws and basic attacks. Due to her longer limbs, she has a higher range than most fighters, while her stance puts her lower to the ground than most taller characters. In addition, she is one of the only characters with the ability to heal via a Super Attack, aptly named Healing, which if uninterrupted will restore a good amount of her health. While in Street Fighter III using this move was a tactical choice as she could only select one super attack for the entirety of the fight, in Ultra Street Fighter IV, it was now available alongside more traditional super attacks, giving her both offensive and defensive options. This has led to her being described as one of the best characters for beginners to use.

Originally voiced by Kaoru Fujino, Mie Midori took over voice-acting duties with the release of 3rd Strike. Her later appearances were voiced by Saki Fujita and Karen Dyer in Japanese and English respectively. Fujino commented that in particular she had difficulty with English voice lines, as she was not fluent in the language. Regardless she enjoyed the endeavor, and approached her voice lines as if the fighting was a natural part of life for Elena instead of a competition.

=== In other media ===
Elena plays a minor role in the first volume of the Street Fighter III: Ryu Final manga by Masahiko Nakahira. In it, she observes the fight between protagonist Ryu and Dudley through her connection to nature and helps him overcome the boxer, much to Dudley's delight. In the book Street Fighter: The Novel written by Takashi Yanodrawn, she appears in the second chapter and encounters interpol agent Chun-Li, who seeks information to help her take down the criminal organization Shadaloo. Elena offers to fight her for the information, and after losing agrees to help her against the organization. She also briefly appears in issue 74.5 of the manga series Kengan Ashura, as one of the fighters representing the "Capcom Association" present to watch Ryu fight the protagonist Ohma Tokita. The event is later suggested to be a dream that Ohma had.

She also appears throughout UDON Entertainment's Street Fighter comic series. Introduced in Street Fighter Legends: Ibuki's second issue as a new student at a school, she meets the tomboy Makoto and teen ninja Ibuki, helping the latter train and fight off a rival ninja clan during the series. In Street Fighter Unlimited, the girls are invited to self-proclaimed god Gill's fighting tournament, where she incites an impromptu dance party before said tournament and encounters the troubled mutant Necro, convincing him and his girlfriend to join their party to ease his mind. After Gill reveals himself to be a villain, she fights alongside the other participants to take him down. In the followup crossover series Street Fighter vs. Darkstalkers, she fights alongside Darkstalkers series character Victor and the other heroes against an impending apocalypse, and helps heal his comatose sister. In later comics, she appears in Street Fighter: Hyper Looting, a promotional comic for the company Loot Crate, and in Street Fighter: Back to School Special, in which after wrestling with Makoto they ponder what college to attend.

== Promotion and reception ==
To promote the character and games, Capcom released a wide variety of stationary figures and garage kits of the character in a variety of poses. These come from manufacturers including G-Dome, Mad Hands, Yujin, and Kotabukiya, and while most were based on her primary appearance, several were released with alternate versions based on character-select color options in Street Fighter III. In addition, her current English voice actress Karen Dyer has cosplayed the character multiple times to promote herself. To promote the release of New Generation, several items of merchandise were created featuring Elena such as phone cards, while for 3rd Strike's Online Edition player avatar items of the character were released for Sony's PlayStation Network.

Elena has been mostly well-received by video game critics and writers. GamesRadar+ described her "wearing almost nothing and acrobatically showing off her crotch at every opportunity" and the smoothness of her animation in Street Fighter III, adding that she was more than just "a bikini-clad tease with impossibly fluid and graceful movements". Planet Xbox 360 shared the sentiment, stating that her presence brings "a lot of depth to character roster that truly needs more women representation", and further praising her beauty by noting "if guys drool over Cammy’s legs, then Elena should make them blush in the company of other women." Paste praised Elena as "a great character from a design standpoint", though were critical of how her gameplay transitioned from Street Fighter III to IV. Regardless they described her fighting style as elegant, and added that "Elena is still one of the series' strongest ideas."

However, Edge magazine criticized her fighting style, stating that it "made her feel more like a Tekken character than one drawn from Capcom's asset library." Amanda LaPergola of The Mary Sue stated mixed feelings about the character, praising her appearance in combat and describing her as a "unique fighter with a lot of flare [sic] and style". On the other hand, she cared little for personality, specifically noting "she fights in a bikini, and looks and acts like Storm’s annoying younger sister" while also calling out her "'but I just want to be a normal girl!' storyline" as a common trope she disliked amongst female Street Fighter characters. However, she acknowledged the character was making an effort, "so you can’t hate on her that much." Gavin Jasper of Den of Geek added that "Elena’s design never caught on with me," further elaborating that her storyline purpose of wanting to make friends was "lame" in his view, though admitted that he changed his mind upon seeing her Street Fighter IV ending and the extent of which she was able to befriend other characters, namely the normally fierce Akuma.

Some discussion regarding Elena's design feel it reflects European standards of beauty over those of black culture. Her depiction in Street Fighter Duel has particularly been accused of whitewashing.

Funké Joseph of IGN praised her as the "first playable Black woman in the series, and, at the time, one of the only Black women in video games at all" in regards to her appearance in the first Street Fighter III, and gave further praise to her use of capoeira, adding it "offers a sense fluidity and finesse that other characters don’t possess." However, some like Amanda LaPergola in the aforementioned Mary Sue article drew issue with her design, her specifically noting that while other characters in the series were exaggerated stereotypes, "it seems like the default mode for “character from Africa' is always 'a tribal princess who wears no clothes." Author Nnedi Okorafor cited her "light skin, blue eyes and white hair" and "European features" as an example of how a character's ethnicity did not always match their appearance, and discussed her further regarding the lack of actual dark-skinned and African women in gaming, asking "Could it be that game makers felt that beauty existed only in those of 'fair' skin, straight hair, and small noses?"

While Jean-Karlo Lemus of Anime News Network acknowledged there was some criticism towards her design, particularly in regards to how she seemed to conform to European standards of beauty, he nonetheless described her as one of the most influential women in Capcom's history due to her role as the Street Fighter franchise's first black female character and saw her as a fan favorite. However, he shared fan response in regards to her portrayal in the mobile game Street Fighter Duel, where she was often depicted with a lighter skintone to the extent of appearing whitewashed. Lemus felt this was particularly reflected in the "Trendy Elena" portrayal of the character in the game, which is based on Japanese gyaru fashion. While he felt her already dark skin tone and presence in Japan made the style appropriate for her, its implementation was another matter as it was more blatantly whitewashed in his eyes. While he emphasized that lighting was often a factor in how darker skintones were portrayed in media, in the case of Duel her appearance deviated too far from her original design to the point she seemed to be a different character entirely. He observed that this change received an almost universal negative reaction from fans of the character while he himself expressed disappointment with Capcom.
