= Croal =

Croal may refer to:

- River Croal, a river in Greater Manchester, England

Surname

- Jimmy Croal, Scottish football player
- N'Gai Croal, video game critic and consultant
