= Giant Bomb =

Video game website, launched 2008

- Screenshot Screenshot of Giant Bomb home page in 2013
- Website type: Streaming media Video, Video game wiki website, video game journalism, Internet community, comedy
- Predecessor: GameSpot
- Owners: Jeffinitely, LLC (2025–present); Fandom Inc. (2022–2025); Red Ventures (2020–2022); CBS Interactive (2012–2020); Whiskey Media (2008–2012)
- Creators: Jeff Gerstmann; Dave Snider; Whiskey Media
- Founders: Jeff Gerstmann; Ryan Davis; Dave Snider
- Website: www.giantbomb.com
- Commercial: Yes
- Registration: Optional (free and paid)
- Launched: March 6, 2008; 18 years ago (blog); July 21, 2008 (full website)
- Current status: Active

Giant Bomb is an American video game website and wiki that includes personality-driven gaming videos, commentary, news and reviews, created by former GameSpot editors Jeff Gerstmann and Ryan Davis. The website was voted by Time magazine as one of the Top 50 websites of 2011. In 2018, Variety magazine said that Giant Bomb had "redefined what it meant to be a video game website". Originally part of Whiskey Media, the website was acquired by CBS Interactive in March 2012 before being sold to Red Ventures in 2020, then to Fandom in 2022. As of 2025, the site is independently owned by Jeffinitely, LLC, a company formed by Giant Bomb's co-owners Jeff Bakalar and Jeff Grubb.

After being terminated from his position as editorial director of GameSpot, Gerstmann began working with a team of web engineers to create a new video game website. His intent was to create "a fun video game website" that would not heavily cover the business side of the game industry. The site's core editorial staff consisted primarily of former GameSpot editors. Giant Bomb was unveiled on March 6, 2008, as a blog; the full site launched on July 21, 2008. The Giant Bomb offices were originally in Sausalito, California, before moving to San Francisco in 2010, with a second office established in New York City in 2014. Following the COVID-19 pandemic in 2020, both offices were closed and the website permanently shifted to a remote work environment.

Content on Giant Bomb comes from the site's staff as well as its community, which contributes to the site's video game wiki database that is open to editing by all registered users. The Giant Bomb staff covers video game news and new releases in the form of video, written articles, and podcasts. Their weekly podcast, the Giant Bombcast, is posted on Tuesdays, and covers the video game industry as well as happenings around the office. Giant Bomb produces a number of regular video series including Quick Looks, 20–90 minute unedited looks at recently released games.

== History ==
=== GameSpot departures, origins under Whiskey Media (2007–2011) ===
Jeff Gerstmann was terminated from his position as the editorial director of GameSpot on November 28, 2007. After his termination, rumors began to circulate around the Internet that his dismissal was a result of external pressure from Eidos Interactive, the publisher behind the video game Kane & Lynch: Dead Men. Gerstmann had given the game a negative review while Eidos had purchased advertising for the game on the website. Both GameSpot and their parent company CNET Networks stated that his dismissal was unrelated to the review. In what was labelled as the "GameSpot Exodus" by Joystiq, Alex Navarro, Ryan Davis, Brad Shoemaker, and Vinny Caravella all left GameSpot. Davis announced his departure from GameSpot in February 2008, citing Gerstmann's firing as one of his reasons for leaving.

Jeff's firing just destroyed me, and I think it shed a light on the other stuff that I had been kind of rolling along with. It's just that I had been at the job for a long time, and a lot of the stuff that made the job fun for me has dissipated. Sometimes you don't love the job, but you make your way through it by focusing on the good stuff. GameSpot is also a huge site, and an organization of that magnitude comes with a fair amount of bureaucracy, and everyone ultimately ends up spending a fair amount of time doing stuff other than producing the content. I realize that the big story is the nasty management team and their dirty dealings, but honestly before Jeff's firing, I had very little contact with upper management, and I had no reason to believe that they didn't know what they were doing, I think the Kane & Lynch thing gets way more weight in this story than it deserves. Any disagreements about that game strike me as a symptom, not a cause.

— Ryan Davis, February 5th, 2008

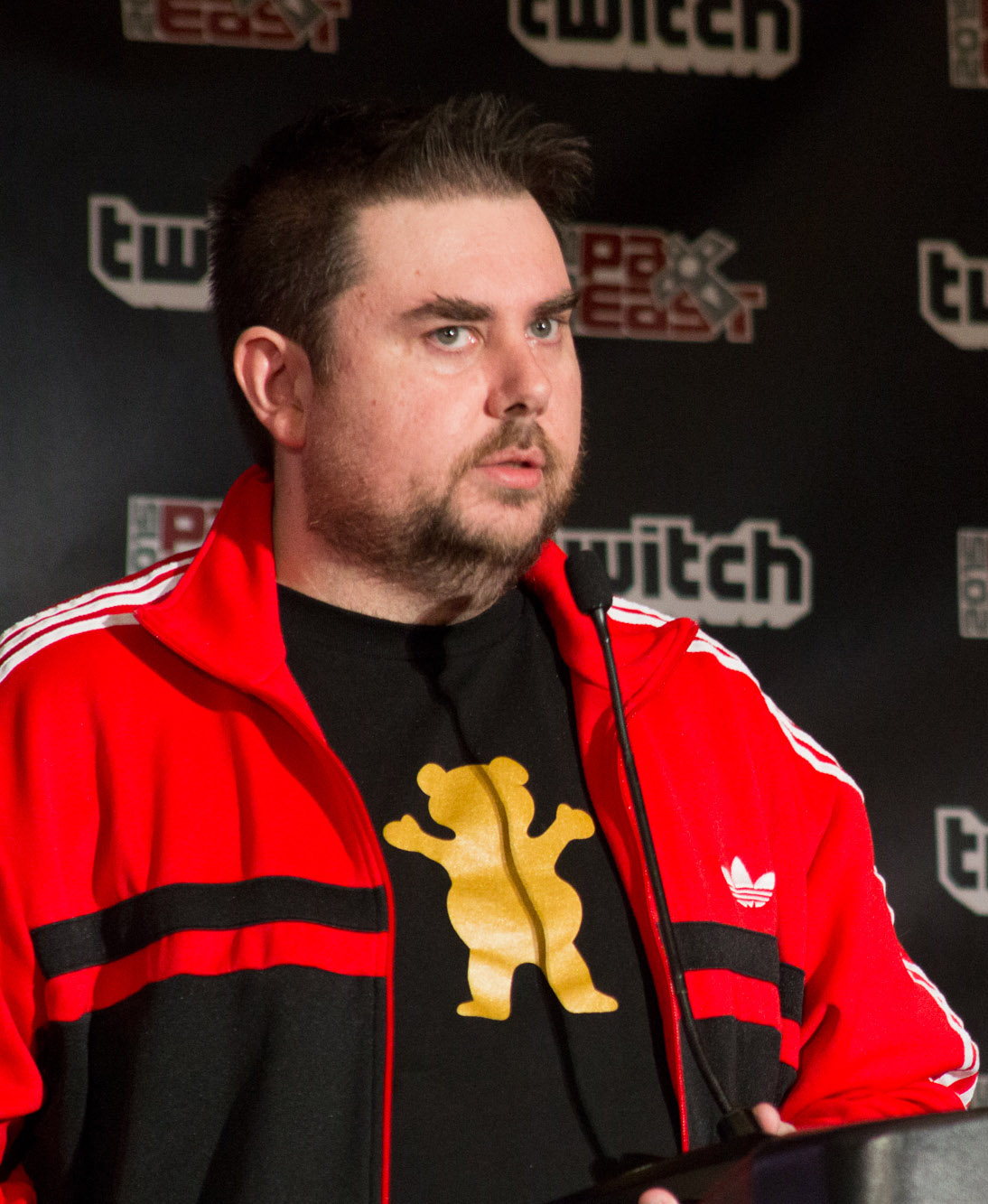
Jeff Gerstmann felt that video game news had become "stale".

Gerstmann ultimately decided he did not wish to work in game development or public relations and began to work with Shelby Bonnie's Whiskey Media to begin developing a new site. Talking with Tyler Wilde of GamesRadar, Gerstmann said that their intent was not to make a site that would compete with GameSpot, but rather create "a really great and fun video game website ... that we like and that we would use, and that users will have a blast using as well." In the process of deciding on the name for the website, over seventy different domain names were considered. Gerstmann wanted the website name to be catchy and original, saying there were too many video game websites with the word "game" in them. Giant Bomb started as a WordPress blog, which opened on March 5, 2008. The full site launched on July 20, 2008. In addition to Davis, who recorded early episodes of the site's podcast, the Giant Bombcast, with Gerstmann, former GameSpot editors Shoemaker and Caravella joined the site in June 2008. In November 2008, Drew Scanlon became one of Giant Bomb's first interns, later being officially hired as a video producer the following year. Navarro left his post as Community manager for Harmonix Music Systems to join Giant Bomb and its sister-site Screened in May 2010.

We're still just four guys, and we still feel that there's plenty of places to get 'coverage' out there. Our focus will be on commentary and perspective on the significant goings-on in video games. And, you know, fun! We don't want to run sales numbers stories. There's enough business out there in the game press, everyone trying to be Serious Journalists. I've got big respect for the way guys like N'Gai Croal and Stephen Totilo carry themselves, but no ... I'd rather do stuff that makes me laugh. ... I'll be honest, I wasn't 100% sure this was going to work before we launched, but the response we've gotten so far has been so overwhelming, I'm confident that we're doing something that no one else really is.

— Ryan Davis, August 23rd, 2008

Unlike most video game websites, Giant Bomb does not heavily cover industry news from a business perspective. During an interview on X-Play, Gerstmann said that he thought video game websites had become too focused on the business side of games, and that game news had become "stale" in the process. "We want to get out there and talk about games, because we like games ... and it seems like there's an audience out there, and they like games ... and their needs aren't being met by what's out there right now."

After working for 1UP.com, MTV News, G4, and Electronic Gaming Monthly, video game reporter Patrick Klepek made contact with Giant Bomb in October 2010 regarding Klepek's desire to work for the site. Klepek, known for breaking the story of the 2010 employee firings, departures, and lawsuits between Infinity Ward and Activision cited the website as "the singular bastion of a truly independent voice" in video game journalism. In 2011, Gerstmann commented that the industry was now "not getting as much news from the news sites as [it] used to, but the post count from these sites just seems to go higher and higher." In order to establish its own brand of "honest, original reporting" news, Giant Bomb hired Klepek as News Editor in April 2011.

=== Acquisition by CBS Interactive (2012) ===
March 2012 saw Shelby Bonnie sell Whiskey Media in two deals, splitting the company's websites. Gail Berman and Lloyd Braun's BermanBraun bought the company, its publishing platform, and websites Tested, Screened, and Anime Vice. Giant Bomb and its comic-book sister-site Comic Vine were sold separately to CBS Interactive, the owners of GameSpot and its parent company CNET. Following the sale of the publishing platform to BermanBraun, the site was rebuilt. The redesigned site launched on February 12, 2013.

Gerstmann explained that behind the scenes Giant Bomb had been looking for new ownership in order to facilitate the website's growth and that talks between themselves and CBS Interactive had started as far back as December 2011. Staying in San Francisco, the Giant Bomb and Comic Vine editorial staff, along with designers Dave Snider and Alexis Gallisá, moved to the CBS Interactive building where Gerstmann, Davis, Shoemaker, and Caravella had worked for GameSpot.

As part of the new deal, the non-disparagement agreement between Gerstmann and CNET was nullified, allowing Gerstmann to openly talk about the reason why he was fired from GameSpot in 2007. In an interview with GameSpot, Gerstmann revealed that the firing was a result of a longer stand-off between GameSpot's then-management division and its editorial staff. Gerstmann had been "called into a room" three times between October 23, 2007, and November 29, 2007. The first time concerned a reviewer's scoring of 7.5 for Ratchet & Clank Future: Tools of Destruction, for which Sony Computer Entertainment America had threatened to pull advertising money. The second concerned Gerstmann's 6.0 Kane & Lynch: Dead Men review, which provoked further threats by Eidos Interactive. On the third call, some time after the release of the review, Gerstmann was informed that his contract was terminated.

=== Davis' death and tribute, new hires, departures, and expansion (2013–2016) ===
In July 2013, the site revealed that co-founder and long-time fixture of the website, Ryan Davis, died July 3, 2013, at age 34, days after his wedding to Anna Davis. Davis's father Richard Davis confirmed that the death was of natural causes.

I think whether they realized it or not, most people who write about video games kind of wanted to be Ryan Davis. I know I did. Ryan was that rare voice that was able to be brutally critical and frank and funny, and still be well-liked by basically everybody. How could anybody walk the line that well?

I've been doing this for years now, and with every word I've written or said, I've become more convinced that it turns out I was right about one thing: The trick was a simple one. The secret to being as good as Ryan Davis was just this: Be Ryan Davis. Not a stunt that me or anybody else can pull off, but I'm honored I got to see it in person.

— Justin McElroy of Polygon, July 8th, 2013

The gaming industry paid tribute to Davis through social media, written articles, and video. Gary Whitta, Michael Pachter, Sean Vanaman, and Greg Miller were among the prominent names to voice their thoughts on Davis's death. During the recording of that week's episode of Bonus Round for GameTrailers, Geoff Keighley hosted a memorial episode dedicated to Davis's death along with guests Pachter, Jessica Chobot, and Kyle Bosman. The German musician C418, known for his work on the Minecraft soundtrack, released "Taswell", a musical tribute to Davis.

Giant Bomb announced two opening vacancies in 2014 for senior editor and video producer positions. At the same time, Caravella announced that he was moving from San Francisco to his home-town in New York following the birth of his second child. In addition to the two new staff members, Caravella and Navarro would open a new studio in CBS Interactive's New York offices. The reasoning for expansion stemmed from having the two offices recording simultaneously to increase the variety of content and subsequently not competing for studio time and people, while also giving the opportunity for the new staff members to establish themselves and freshen up the content being made in San Francisco. The new hires were announced as Game Informer staff members Dan Ryckert and Jason Oestreicher, who had worked at Game Informer since 2009 and 2011 respectively.

In December 2014, Klepek announced his departure from the website. In his final post, Klepek thanked the staff and the Giant Bomb community, saying "Until Giant Bomb, I held a devil-may-care attitude about my employment, and no place kept my attention very long. It's not to suggest I've never cared about my work before Giant Bomb, but I never loved where I worked until strolling into the Whiskey Media offices back in 2011." Klepek later announced that he would be joining Kotaku as a senior reporter.

In May 2015, Austin Walker joined the editorial team at Giant Bomb, working out of the New York offices alongside Caravella and Navarro. Walker announced his departure from the website in June 2016 to become the editor-in-chief for Waypoint, later hiring fellow Giant Bomb alumnus Klepek as well. In September 2016, Ryckert announced he would be permanently relocating to the New York office at the start of the new year, with a new hire scheduled to join the San Francisco office in the following months.

=== Scanlon, blinking white guy meme, and departure (2017–2019) ===
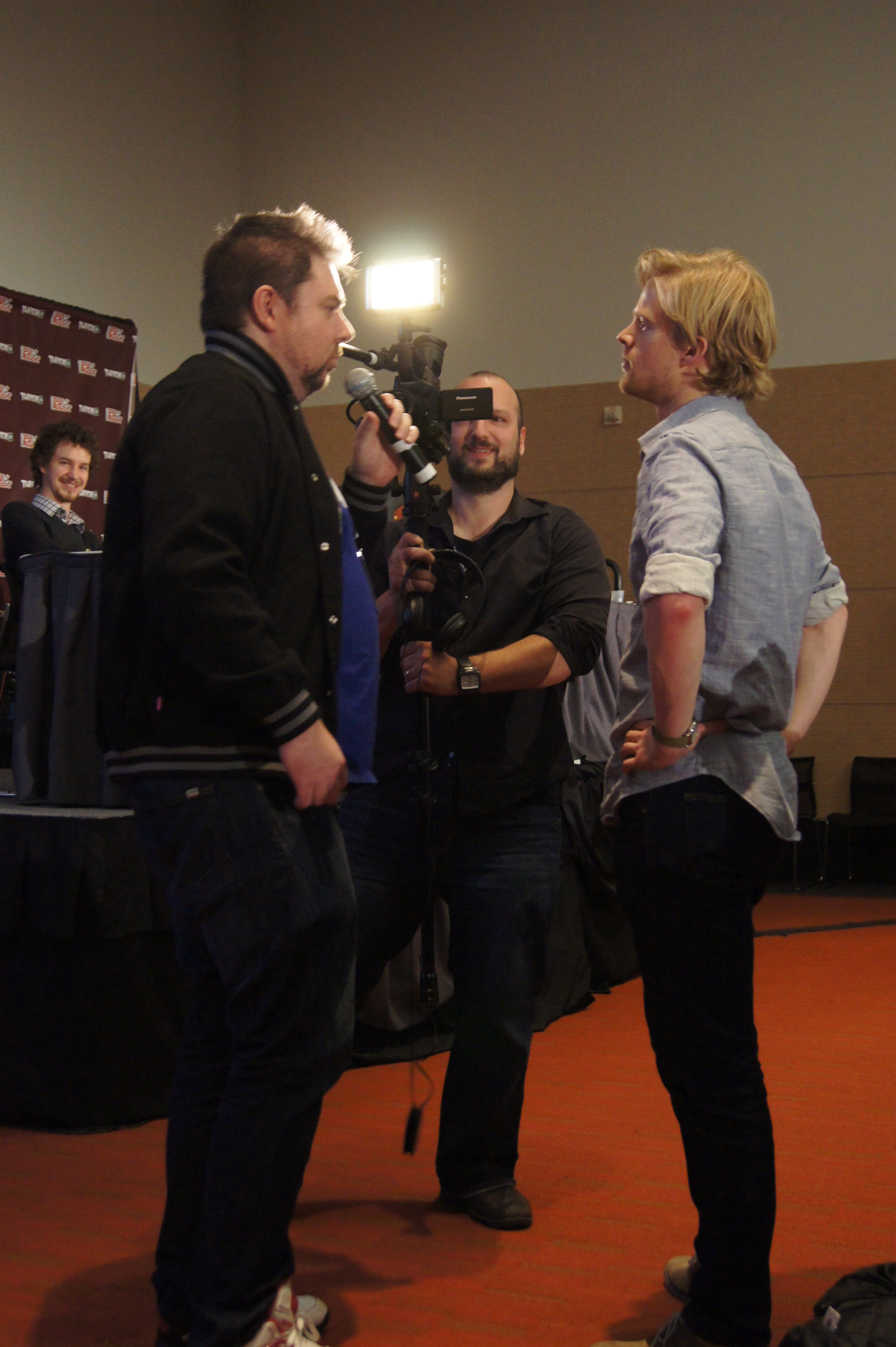
The GIF image of Drew Scanlon (right) blinking grew in usage to the point of becoming Internet phenomena.

A GIF image of video producer Drew Scanlon, nicknamed the "Blinking White Guy" GIF, became an Internet meme in February 2017 after becoming viral on Twitter. The reaction GIF, which originated from an episode of the video series Unprofessional Fridays in 2013, was noted by Mashable for its versatility in being used as a reaction in tweets. The meme has resulted in multiple tweets accruing hundreds of thousands of retweets and likes while Cosmopolitan magazine called it "the most relatable meme ever". In interviews with BuzzFeed and The Guardian, Scanlon commented on his approval of the meme and noted how people separate the real person behind it, saying "I do feel fairly removed."

That same week, San Francisco Chronicle's SF Gate website reported that Scanlon had announced that he was leaving Giant Bomb at the end of the month. Going into more detail on the Giant Bombcast, Scanlon explained his intention to begin a Patreon-funded solo documentary project titled "Cloth Map" and joked with Gerstmann about the timing of the blinking meme going viral coinciding with his announcement, despite informing his colleagues of the decision weeks before. On May 1, 2017, Giant Bomb announced that Abby Russell and former intern Ben Pack would be joining the Giant Bomb East and West offices respectively, with additional hires planned for later in the year. Caravella commented on the hires of Russell and Pack, saying that "Gaming culture has changed so much over the last decade and there are so many new voices that need a chance to be heard. I have always felt very lucky to have been there since the beginning of our industry, but it's also fascinating to me now to get the perspectives of people that weren't there." In November 2017 the site announced that a new video producer, Jan Ochoa, had taken the seat vacated by Scanlon.

=== Remote work, acquisition by Red Ventures, Nextlander departures, and new contractors (2020–2021) ===
In January 2020, Dan Ryckert announced his departure from the site, having accepted a position as a podcast producer for WWE. The following March, both offices were closed in response to the COVID-19 pandemic, forcing the staff to work remotely from their homes. In September 2020, ViacomCBS announced the sale of CNET and related websites to the Red Ventures marketing firm for US$500 million. Jeff Gerstmann later confirmed that Giant Bomb was among the sites included in the sale. The following October, Abby Russell announced that she would be departing the site at the end of November 2020. In January 2021, Ben Pack announced he would be leaving the site after the Game of the Year discussions concluded later that month. The same month, longtime Giant Beastcast co-host Jeff Bakalar of CNET was named Head of Content Development and Strategy for Giant Bomb.

In May 2021, Vinny Caravella, Alex Navarro, and Brad Shoemaker announced that they were leaving the site, effectively leading to the closure of the New York studio. The three later established a new podcast and streaming project, "Nextlander", the following month, gaining over 5000 Patreon subscribers within its first day of activity. In a statement made to GameSpot following the departures, Gerstmann confirmed that they would be "using this as an opportunity to rethink what this site is. It's a chance to introduce new personalities from different backgrounds and explore categories and topics that [Giant Bomb] never have before." On the June 8, 2021, episode of the Giant Bombcast, Giant Bomb confirmed that in addition to hiring new on-camera and production staff, multiple others who had appeared as guests in previous Giant Bomb content would be joining as contractors and contributing new shows and content, including Danny O'Dwyer of Noclip; Jeff Grubb of VentureBeat; Tamoor Hussain and Lucy James of GameSpot; Evil Uno of All Elite Wrestling; actors Matt Shipman and Janina Gavankar; and Giant Bomb alumni Ryckert and Pack. In October 2021, Giant Bomb announced that YouTube video producer Jess O'Brien, who had been assisting Giant Bomb in a contractor role, would be joining the site as a full-time employee. Gerstmann confirmed in a later episode of the Giant Bombcast that the San Francisco office would be closing and the site would be permanently shifting to a remote work environment.

=== Gerstmann's firing, reorganization, and acquisition by Fandom (2022–2025) ===
On June 6, 2022, Giant Bomb announced Jeff Gerstmann's departure from the website. The following day, Gerstmann confirmed he would be starting a new independent podcast, "The Jeff Gerstmann Show", funded via Patreon. Gerstmann elaborated in the podcast's first episode later that day that the decision to leave Giant Bomb was a result of feeling overly stressed and creatively stifled by the increasing bureaucracy and time spent on business and management while working under a corporation, coupled with a desire to spend more time focusing on the actual production of content and the discussion of games and the industry. Gerstmann elaborated further in the October 25 episode of the podcast, stating that he "got fired three weeks before [he] was going to quit;" while uncertain as to the exact circumstances surrounding his dismissal, he noted that he had become disillusioned at that time, as it had become clear that his goals for the website would not be possible under their parent company.

On the same day as Gerstmann's podcast began, Giant Bomb announced a reorganization focused on a core crew of nine personalities. In addition to Rorie, Oestreicher, Ochoa, Bakalar, and O'Brien, Tamoor Hussain and Lucy James would be joining Giant Bomb while also remaining part of GameSpot's editorial team, with Jeff Grubb joining the site full time and producing a daily news show, Game Mess Mornings, as well. Former editor Dan Ryckert would also be returning to the site, now in a creative director position. On October 3, 2022, Fandom, Inc. announced that they had acquired multiple entertainment websites from Red Ventures, including Giant Bomb. On January 19, 2023, several employees of various Fandom websites were laid off, including Oestreicher and O'Brien. On the March 14, 2023, episode of the Giant Bombcast, Matthew Rorie announced he would be departing the site at the end of the week.

=== Independence (2025–present) ===
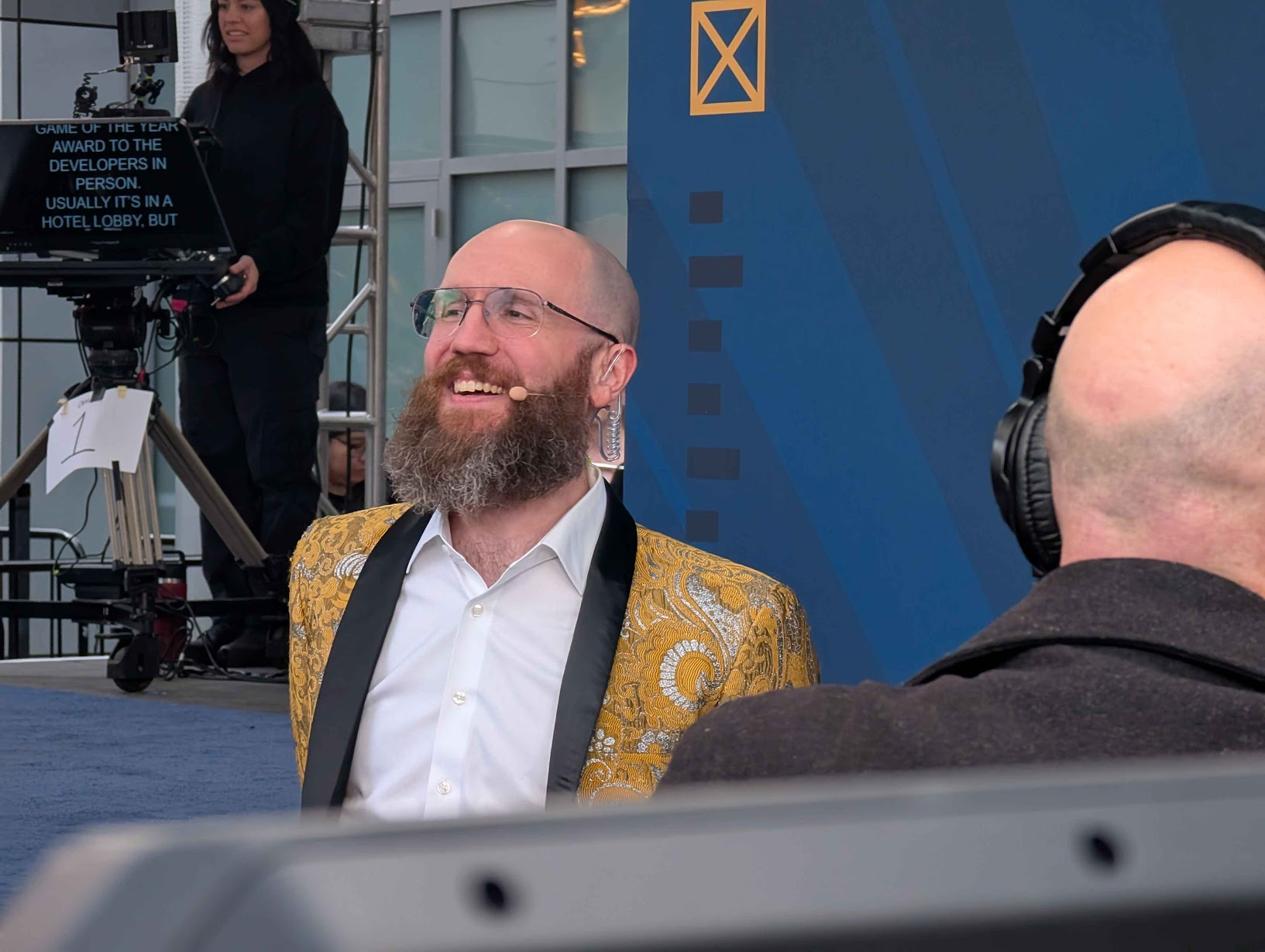
Dan Ryckert became a co-owner of Giant Bomb in 2025 after Fandom sold it to its staff, ending Giant Bomb's 13 years under corporate ownership.

In March 2025, Giant Bomb and GameSpot launched the Power Block, a shared streaming block made up of content from both websites. However, conflict arose in April after Fandom management forced all streaming activities to be halted, along with placing content restrictions on the site due to "brand safety" concerns. This culminated on April 30, with episode #888 of the Giant Bombcast, in which the staff openly mocked these changes, being removed shortly after release; the following day, Grubb confirmed he was no longer employed at Giant Bomb, while Ryckert and longtime contributor Mike Minotti stated they would no longer be appearing on the site due to disagreement with Fandom's treatment of Grubb and direction for Giant Bomb's future.

One week later during a live Giant Bombcast recording at PAX East, Grubb and Bakalar announced that the two had purchased the site from Fandom, and would be sharing ownership with Ryckert, Ochoa, and Minotti. The staff confirmed that funding would primarily be driven by premium subscriptions and merchandise sales going forward.

== Main features ==
Giant Bomb's editorial content is described as lighter and looser than the traditional news and review video game websites, focusing on video content with the intent of being humorous and entertaining.

=== Video ===
Giant Bomb

Twitch information
- Channel: GiantBomb
- Genres: Gaming, Talk Show
- Followers: 77.1 thousand

YouTube information
- Channel: Giant Bomb
- Years active: 2009–present
- Genres: Gaming; Let's Play; Podcast; Talk Show; Video game livestreaming
- Subscribers: 245 thousand
- Views: 209 million
- Last updated: September 13, 2025

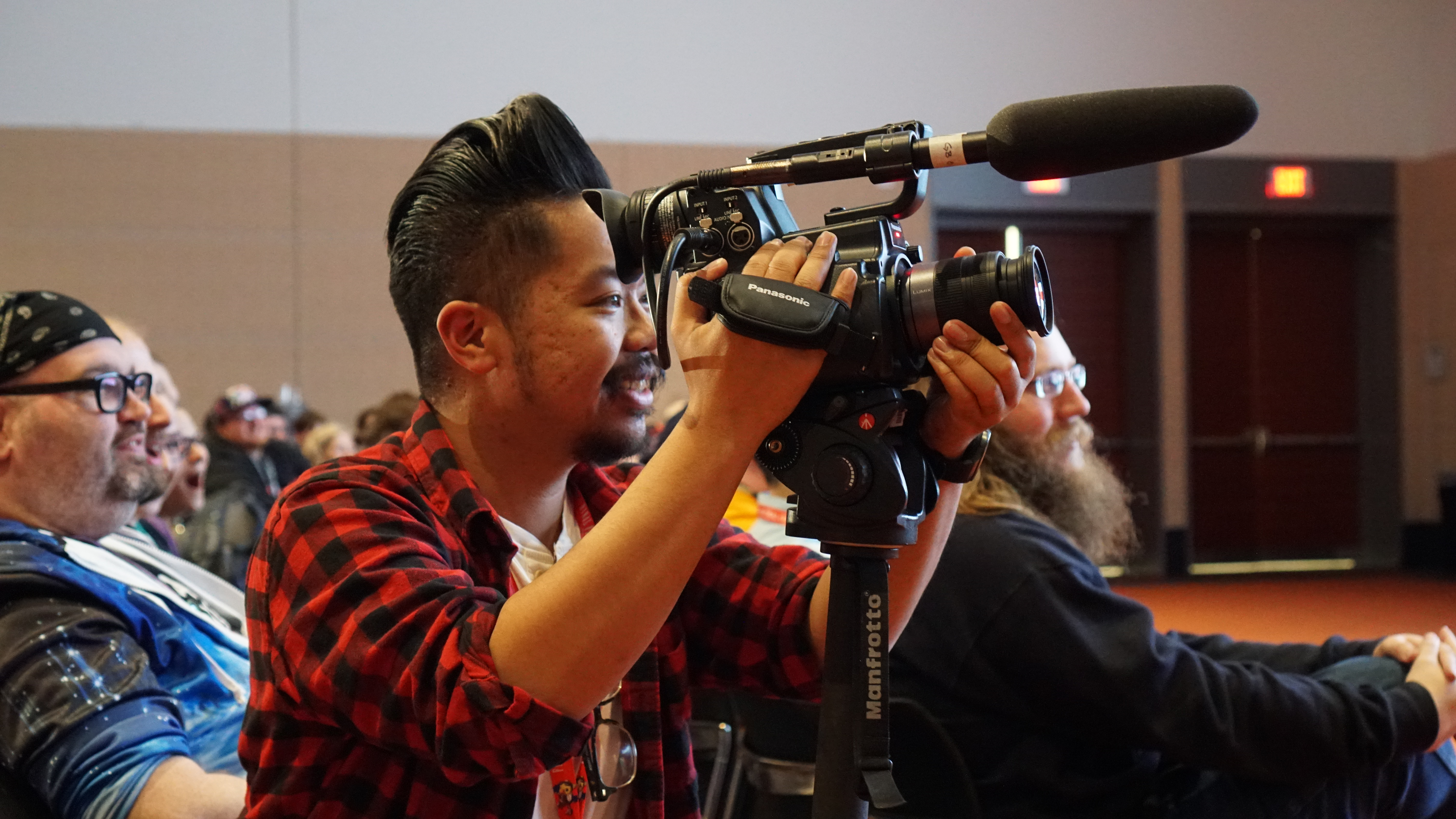
Jan Ochoa joined Giant Bomb as a video producer in 2017.

Giant Bomb videos are currently produced by Ochoa. Videos are hosted on Giant Bomb and non-paywall videos are also available via YouTube and as a free channel on digital media streaming devices such as Roku. This Ain't No Game (TANG) was a weekly series throughout 2009 in which Davis would review movies based on video games, based on Davis' intention to, "challenge [himself] to watch and assess every video-game movie ever made". The name of the series was taken from the marketing tagline for the Super Mario Bros. movie. Despite TANG criticizing the film Mortal Kombat Annihilation, Mortal Kombat co-creator Ed Boon said the episode in question was kind to it, considering its critical response.

The Endurance Run was a daily video feature in which Caravella and Gerstmann played the PlayStation 2 role-playing game Persona 4 in real time, with their own commentary over the video. The idea for the Endurance Run stemmed from Gerstmann and Caravella's own interest in playing Persona 4, a game they were both curious about but didn't have time to play. In 2010 Gerstmann, Caravella, Davis, and Shoemaker split into teams and concurrently played through the Xbox 360 budget action-adventure game Deadly Premonition. After the show ended, Deadly Premonition creator Hidetaka "SWERY" Suehiro visited Giant Bomb in 2011 and 2013. Speaking at sister-site Tested.com's 2011 24-hour charity podcast in aid of Child's Play, Davis and Klepek revealed themselves as the players of the 3rd Endurance Run, playing the Super Nintendo Entertainment System release of Chrono Trigger. The feature went on hiatus for four years until the PAX West event in September 2016, where Caravella, Navarro, and Ryckert announced they would be reviving the Endurance Run feature, playing through the Dreamcast game Shenmue. The Endurance Run feature was later revived a decade later in 2026 to commemorate Giant Bomb's first anniversary of independence, with Grubb and Minotti playing through the action-adventure game Bully.

Thursday Night Throwdown was a live weekly multiplayer show. Members of the editorial team played a game with and for users to watch and interact via Twitch. Tim Schafer and Double Fine was in attendance for the episode featuring Iron Brigade (which was then known as Trenched). Preceding the release of the 2011 video game Bastion was the video diary series Building the Bastion, a collaboration with Giant Bomb and the creators of Bastion, Supergiant Games. Documented events featured include the in-house development of the game, public showings at PAX Prime 2011 and eventually gaining Warner Bros. as a publishing partner. Giant Bomb chose not to review the game.

In December 2011, prior to the launch of Star Wars: The Old Republic, the website streamed Star Wars Galaxies during its final 5 hours before being shut down. Kotaku reported events as they happened on the Giant Bomb stream, including a player versus player event between the Star Wars factions the Galactic Empire and The Rebels, as well as an appearance from the Force Ghost of Obi-Wan Kenobi as depicted in The Empire Strikes Back and Return of the Jedi.

Other recurring video series include "Unprofessional Fridays", in which the staff play random games together; "Blight Club", in which Ryckert, Grubb, and Minotti play through poorly-received games; and the Voicemail Dump Truck, a call in show. Following their independence, Giant Bomb stated that the majority of future videos would be available to view without a premium subscription.

==== Quick Look videos ====
The site regularly posts Quick Looks, 20-90 minute videos showing unedited gameplay footage of a single game, featuring uncensored commentary from staff members playing the game, or watching others play. Video game YouTube celebrity John "TotalBiscuit" Bain, who modelled his own video series WTF is... after Quick Looks, describes this new video format as a mix of both entertainment and critique, combined with the essence of a Let's Play video. The feature has been used to profile highly anticipated games, give mention to lesser-known games, or to intentionally showcase bad games for humorous purposes. Quick Looks by Giant Bomb of lesser-known games are often more publicized by their respective developers or communities, such as the fighting game community, as a sign of mainstream recognition. In covering Quick Looks, Dave LeClair of MakeUseOf focused on the format only on the entertainment merit of the Giant Bomb staff playing a given game, citing Quick Looks of Euro Truck Simulator 2, Wipeout: The Game, and the Trains Vs Zombies downloadable content of RailWorks 3 as games LeClair had no interest in playing but recommended as fun viewing in a Quick Look.

==== Giant Bomb @ Nite show ====
Giant Bomb event coverage produced on location both at E3 (2008-2018) and from Summer Game Fest (2023-present), both emanating from Los Angeles

Known for its moniker the Giant Bomb Couch, Giant Bomb @ Nite is an annual set of daily talk shows, live streamed on location during the trade show event known as E3. The current host of Giant Bomb @ Nite is Grubb, succeeding Davis and Gerstmann. From the website's inception Davis had stated Giant Bomb's intention to be present at E3 providing daily long form content. Giant Bomb @ Nite features a rotating panel of guests from the video game industry who provide insight into their experiences working in the video game industry and their participation during that year's event. Additional interviews include the addressing of trending topics in the industry at that given time, including head of Xbox Phil Spencer, who addressed cross-platform play in Fortnite during E3 2018 and the absence of Sony Interactive Entertainment's PlayStation brand from E3 2019.

The show ceased to air as the COVID-19 pandemic forced E3 to function as a virtual event in 2020 onwards, which would be later retired in its entirety. In 2023 Bloomberg News confirmed that Giant Bomb @ Nite would return that year at Geoff Keighley's video game event Summer Game Fest, which was making its physical debut that year. Phil Spencer, now CEO of Microsoft Gaming, appeared along with new Head of Xbox Matt Booty to discuss the then upcoming release of Starfield, following Microsoft's 2021 acquisition of Starfield developer Bethesda. An extra Giant Bomb @ Nite show was produced in December 2024 at The Game Awards following the Countdown to The Game Awards 2024 show, a joint production between Giant Bomb, GameSpot and Fandom. Giant Bomb @ Nite is well regarded in the video game industry with Screen Rant calling it iconic in 2021 and Aftermath referring to it as "beloved" in 2025.

=== Podcasts ===
In April 2012, video game localization company 8-4 announced that they would be entering a partnership with Giant Bomb in which the website would become the new host for the bi-weekly 8-4 podcast. In September 2014 it was announced that Giant Bomb had entered into a partnership with Midroll, a podcast advertisement company.

==== Giant Bombcast ====
Giant Bombcast
- Genre: Video games
- Language: English

Cast and voices
- Hosted by: Ryan Davis (2008–2013); Jeff Gerstmann (2013–2014, 2021–2022); Brad Shoemaker (2014–2021); Jan Ochoa (2022–present)

Production
- Production: Ryan Davis (2008–2013); Jeff Gerstmann (2013-2014, 2021–2022); Brad Shoemaker (2014–2021); Jan Ochoa (2022–present)
- Length: Approx. 150 min.

Publication
- Original release: March 11, 2008
- Provider: Giant Bomb

Related
- Website: http://www.giantbomb.com
- The opening and closing theme of the Giant Bombcast (2011–2012)

The Giant Bombcast is Giant Bomb's weekly podcast, released on Tuesdays. As of June 2022 the show is currently hosted by Ochoa and co-hosted by Grubb, with weekly guests Bakalar, Ryckert, and Minotti. Nicholson Baker of The New Yorker described the podcast as "charmingly garrulous" and compared it with Car Talk in 2011, with The A.V. Club also commenting on it during its review in 2012 as "resembling a conversation among gaming enthusiasts listeners are overhearing".

The show's weekly format includes discussion of games played over the weekend, industry news, recently released games, and e-mails sent in by listeners. The site's staff have also recorded shows in Tokyo, Japan for the Tokyo Game Show, as well as during the Electronic Entertainment Expo and the Penny Arcade Expo. In 2011 the podcast was said to have over 100,000 listeners. Beginning in July 2016, Giant Bomb began live-streaming the recording of the Giant Bombcast in video format.

==== Giant Beastcast ====
In June 2015, Giant Bomb premiered a second weekly podcast, the Giant Beastcast. Released every Friday, the show was recorded in Giant Bomb's New York office and was hosted by Caravella, with weekly guests during its tenure including Navarro, Bakalar, Walker, Ryckert, and Russell. The show followed a similar format to the Giant Bombcast. The podcast was retired in May 2021 following the closure of the New York office and the departure of Caravella and Navarro, concluding with its 311th episode featuring all six hosts.

=== News ===
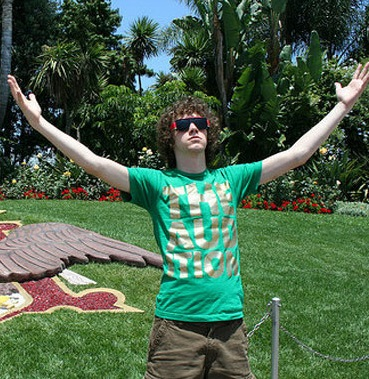
Patrick Klepek credits his employment at Giant Bomb from 2011 to 2014 as a foundation for his career in video games media.

Giant Bomb's news was written by news editors Navarro and Klepek. Articles produced aren't limited to general gaming news, but also include investigative journalistic pieces about the industry, such as the controversy surrounding the developers of LA Noire, Team Bondi, and its work practices. Editorials and interviews written by Klepek during his tenure about gaming ethics, experiences and impact include the story of one person who detailed the mental processes of Asperger syndrome and how his time playing video games differs from the average gamer. An article in July 2011 about the world travel-influenced game creation concept, Game Trekking, featured an interview with founder Jordan Magnuson and his "notgame", The Killer. The Killer was based on his travels in Cambodia and his observations of a nation still recovering from its time as the Democratic Kampuchea under the Khmer Rouge regime, led by Pol Pot from 1975 to 1979. Following the 2011 Evo Championship Series in which Rising Star award winner, 8 year-old Noah Solis made the top 48 players in Marvel vs. Capcom 3: Fate of Two Worlds, Klepek interviewed Solis and his father Moises Solis who praised video games alongside education in avoiding Los Angeles organized crime.

In 2013 Microsoft unveiled their eighth generation video game console, the Xbox One. The Xbox One's pre-release reception was subject to strong criticism following its announcement of functionalities such as the always-on form of digital rights management (DRM), barring consumers from playing purchased games if their Xbox One could not connect to the internet once every 24 hours. On June 19, 2013, Giant Bomb broke the story that Microsoft would reverse these policies and not feature them in the console. After Klepek's article, Microsoft announced the changes later that day.

In response to the industry at large Giant Bomb began to use shows as its method of reporting news with Klepek commenting in 2018 on the transition from articles to video and podcasts as one of the reasons for joining the website.

I also recognized video was the future, and Giant Bomb was a place to do more than dip my toes; it was going into the deep end. If I want to do this for years to come, I need to go where the audience is going, so learning how to be a reporter with a personality that could contribute on podcasts and video seemed like fruitful ground.

— Patrick Klepek, August 16, 2018

==== Game Mess Mornings ====
News reporting on Giant Bomb was started anew in 2021 when Jeff Grubb became one of Giant Bomb's guest contributing contractors that year, running a live stream show called GrubbSnax in which Grubb would provide commentary to recent news. Following the hiring of Grubb in 2022, Giant Bomb launched a new live-stream talk show hosted by Grubb called Game Mess Mornings, named after his YouTube channel. The show was renamed to Game Breaking News for the Power Block collaboration with GameSpot under Fandom in 2025, before reverting to Game Mess Mornings when Giant Bomb became independent and Grubb became a co-owner.

In addition to discussing recent news, Grubb, known as an industry insider, reports his own stories through this medium regarding subjects that are not yet public knowledge, such as unannounced release dates of video games and video game consoles and upcoming events.

=== Reviews ===
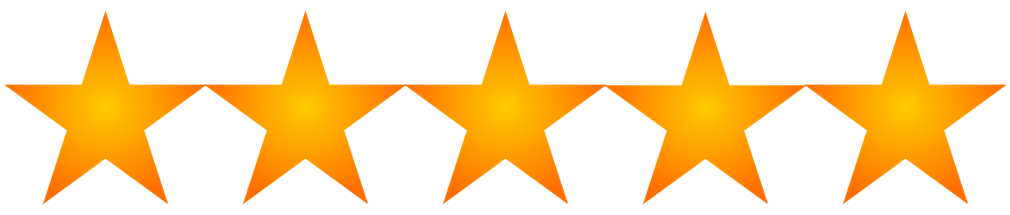
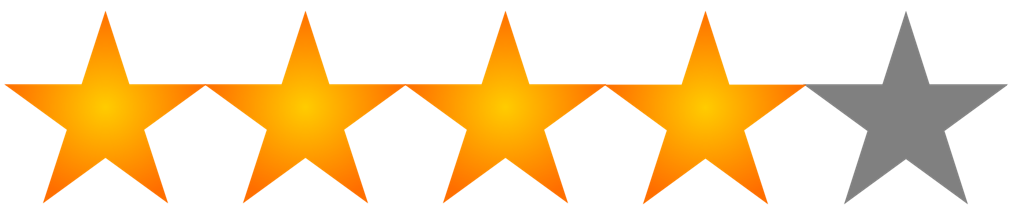
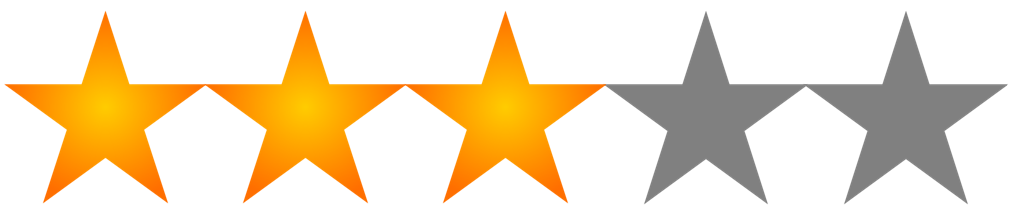
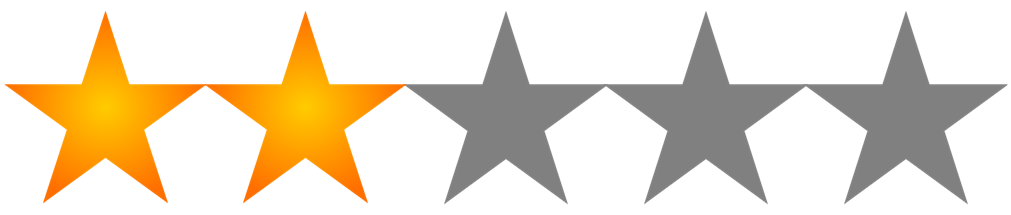
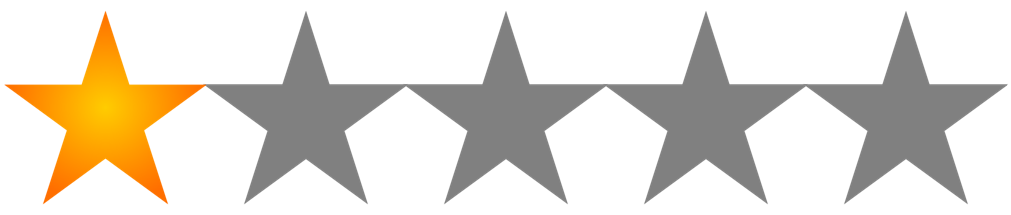
Giant Bomb's five star scale scores appeared as 100, 80, 60, 40 and 20 on Metacritic.

Video games on Giant Bomb are rated on a scale of one to five stars. Beginning in December 2025, the site began giving half-stars in its reviews, starting with Terminator 2D: No Fate. In July 2014, Metacritic listed Giant Bomb as having over 840 reviews in its records, with more than 470 of them positive, more than 250 being mixed and over 110 of them being negative. Of those reviews, 30% were higher than the average critic, 3% the same and 67% were lower. In contrast to their time working for GameSpot, Davis had said that reviews are not representative of Giant Bomb as an entity but are very personalised saying that, "as far as the review process goes, we're being very open about a review being that person's perspective. When a review has to represent an entire organization's perspective on a game, that's where you can run into trouble." During a video game reviews conference on Rock, Paper, Shotgun in 2008, Gerstmann outlined his approach to reviews. Emphasizing the idea of reviews now being more subjective and less objective from the seventh generation video game consoles onwards, due to the audience of video games and video game culture becoming more widespread, Gerstmann said that assisting readers on a given game rather than giving a definite view of it is the direction in which video game reviews are moving towards.

=== Game of the year awards ===
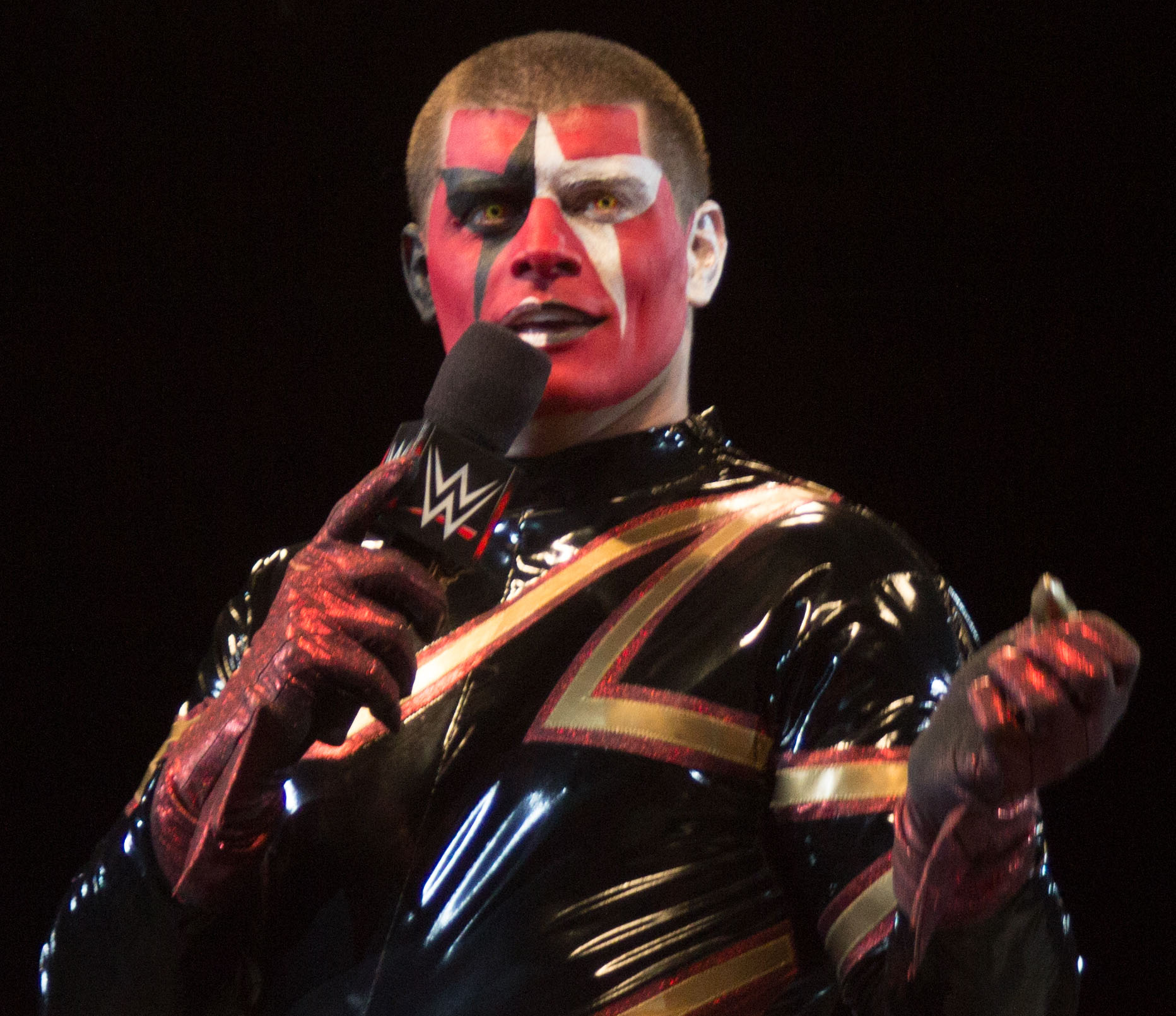
Professional wrestler Cody Rhodes of WWE is said to be a fan of The Legend of Zelda series. Rhodes wrote an in-character article for Giant Bomb as Stardust (pictured) detailing his top 10 video games of 2014.

The annual game of the year awards features multiple podcasts which are live-recordings of the staff's deliberations. Additional comical awards created by Giant Bomb has included the Best Use of Nolan North, otherwise known as The Northies, an award North himself acknowledged. During the awards week, individual top 10 games of the year are posted from each staff member. Celebrity top 10 guest game of the year articles from outside of the video game industry include horror and science fiction film director John Carpenter and WWE professional wrestlers Stardust and Xavier Woods.

Year	Game	Genre(s)	Platform(s)	Developer(s)
2008	Grand Theft Auto IV	Action-adventure	PlayStation 3, Xbox 360, Windows	Rockstar North
2009	Uncharted 2: Among Thieves	Action-adventure, platformer, third-person shooter	PlayStation 3	Naughty Dog
2010	Mass Effect 2	Action role-playing	PlayStation 3, Xbox 360, Windows	BioWare
2011	The Elder Scrolls V: Skyrim	Role-playing	Xbox 360, Windows	Bethesda Game Studios
2012	XCOM: Enemy Unknown	Turn-based strategy	PlayStation 3, Xbox 360, Windows	Firaxis Games
2013	The Last of Us	Action-adventure, survival horror	PlayStation 3	Naughty Dog
2014	Middle-earth: Shadow of Mordor	Action-adventure	PlayStation 4, Xbox One, Windows	Monolith Productions
2015	Super Mario Maker	Platformer	Wii U	Nintendo EAD Group No. 4
2016	Hitman	Action-adventure, stealth	PlayStation 4, Xbox One, Windows	IO Interactive
2017	PlayerUnknown's Battlegrounds	Battle royale	Windows	PUBG Corporation
2018	Tetris Effect	Puzzle	PlayStation 4, PlayStation VR	Monstars Inc. and Resonair
2019	Outer Wilds	Action-adventure	PlayStation 4, Xbox One, Windows	Mobius Digital
2020	Hades	Roguelike	Windows, Nintendo Switch	Supergiant Games
2021	Chicory: A Colorful Tale	Adventure game, Puzzle	PlayStation 5, PlayStation 4, Nintendo Switch, Windows, macOS	Greg Lobanov
2022	Elden Ring	Action role-playing	PlayStation 5, PlayStation 4, Xbox One, Xbox Series X/S, Windows	FromSoftware
2023	The Legend of Zelda: Tears of the Kingdom	Action-adventure	Nintendo Switch	Nintendo EPD
2024	Prince of Persia: The Lost Crown	Action-adventure	Nintendo Switch, PlayStation 5, PlayStation 4, Windows, macOS, Xbox Series X/S, Xbox One	Ubisoft Montpellier
2025	Clair Obscur: Expedition 33	Role-playing	PlayStation 5, Windows, Xbox Series X/S	Sandfall Interactive

=== Community content ===
Users on Giant Bomb have the ability to create blogs, keep track of their game collections, and add information to game entries. Additionally, the site has message boards, saying that "building a community of people ... is a big part of what Giant Bomb is all about". Giant Bomb allows users to contribute to collaborative wiki-based game guides. In Quests users earned experience points and level up in a social gaming element that, "give users incentives to create more content".

==== Wiki-database ====
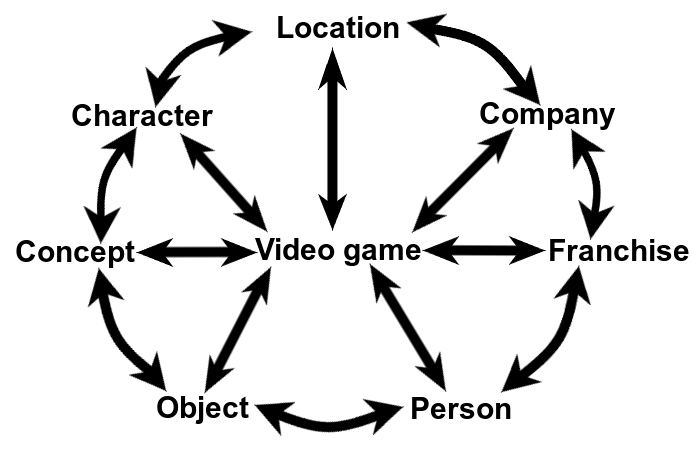
Users create new wiki pages in one of its categories and link them to other pages. Categories include both the properties inside video games and the people who make them.

The Giant Bomb video game wiki-database, which opened with the full site launched in July 2008, combines a structured wiki with a relational database and is editable by registered users of the site. Submissions are approved by appointed wiki moderators before being accepted, but experienced users may forgo this process. The wiki's design has been described as built around the interactivity of video games in contrast to existing wiki models. TechCrunch compares the wiki-database to Wetpaint, Engadget, and its own Crunchbase, which was based on a predecessor of Giant Bomb, Whiskey Media's now retired website Political Base. Ernest W. Adams credited the wiki-database for its use during his research for the writing of his book Fundamentals of Game Design.

The response we've had so far is completely staggering. Right now our biggest concern is recruiting moderators to help us get the tidal wave of information we've received up onto the site. ... We've registered over 10,000 users in just over 24 hours, so there's obviously a big demand for what we're doing there. I've seen a lot of comments of people saying that the whole process of editing pages and linking pages together is addictive, and I know that on the moderation end, it's amazing to see everyone's video game obsessions laid bare. There's a dude who's just going through the database, linking every game that features fog of war to the Fog of War concept page. There are developers filling in their own pages.

— Ryan Davis, July 23, 2008

=== Paid subscription service ===
Described by Variety as "a prototypical version of the [video game] crowdfunding revolution that dawned a few years later," Giant Bomb's paid subscription service launched in September 2010, featuring additional videos, livestreams, and ad-free podcasts exclusive to premium members. In June 2011, Whiskey Media's Mike Tatum reported that they were nearing 10,000 premium members. The paid subscription model has become Giant Bomb's primary source of income in the wake of ad filtering services such as Adblock Plus. In addition to video games, subscription content features coverage of other subjects including professional wrestling, Formula 1, and music. Following the site going independent in 2025, the price of a subscription was increased to account for the lack of corporate backing. However, while the staff confirmed that the majority of content produced would be free, subscribers would continue to receive ad-free podcasts, additional benefits for the site's Discord server as well as access to new and archived premium-only audio and video content.

== Corporate affairs and culture ==
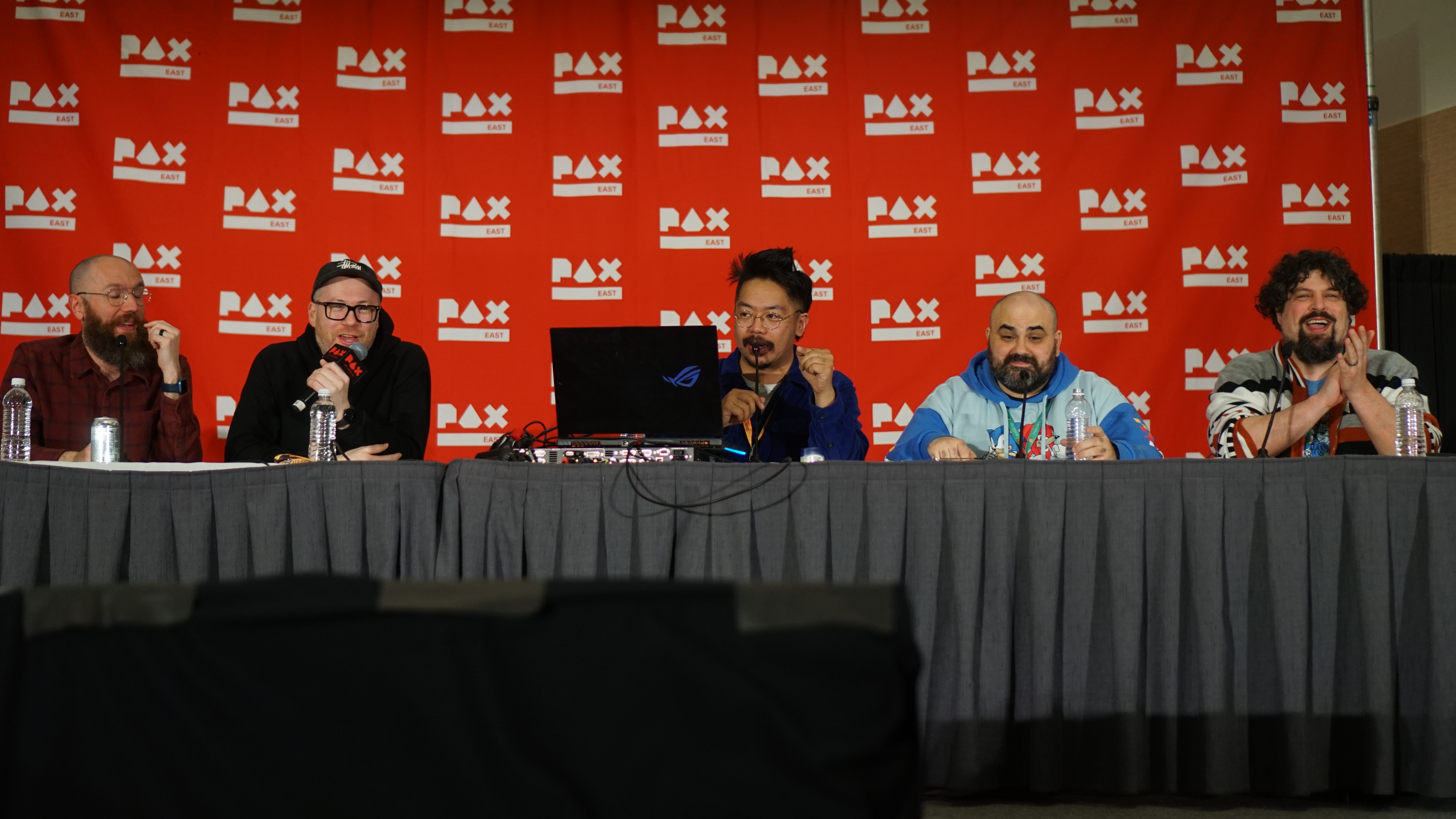
The Giant Bomb co-owners at PAX East 2024

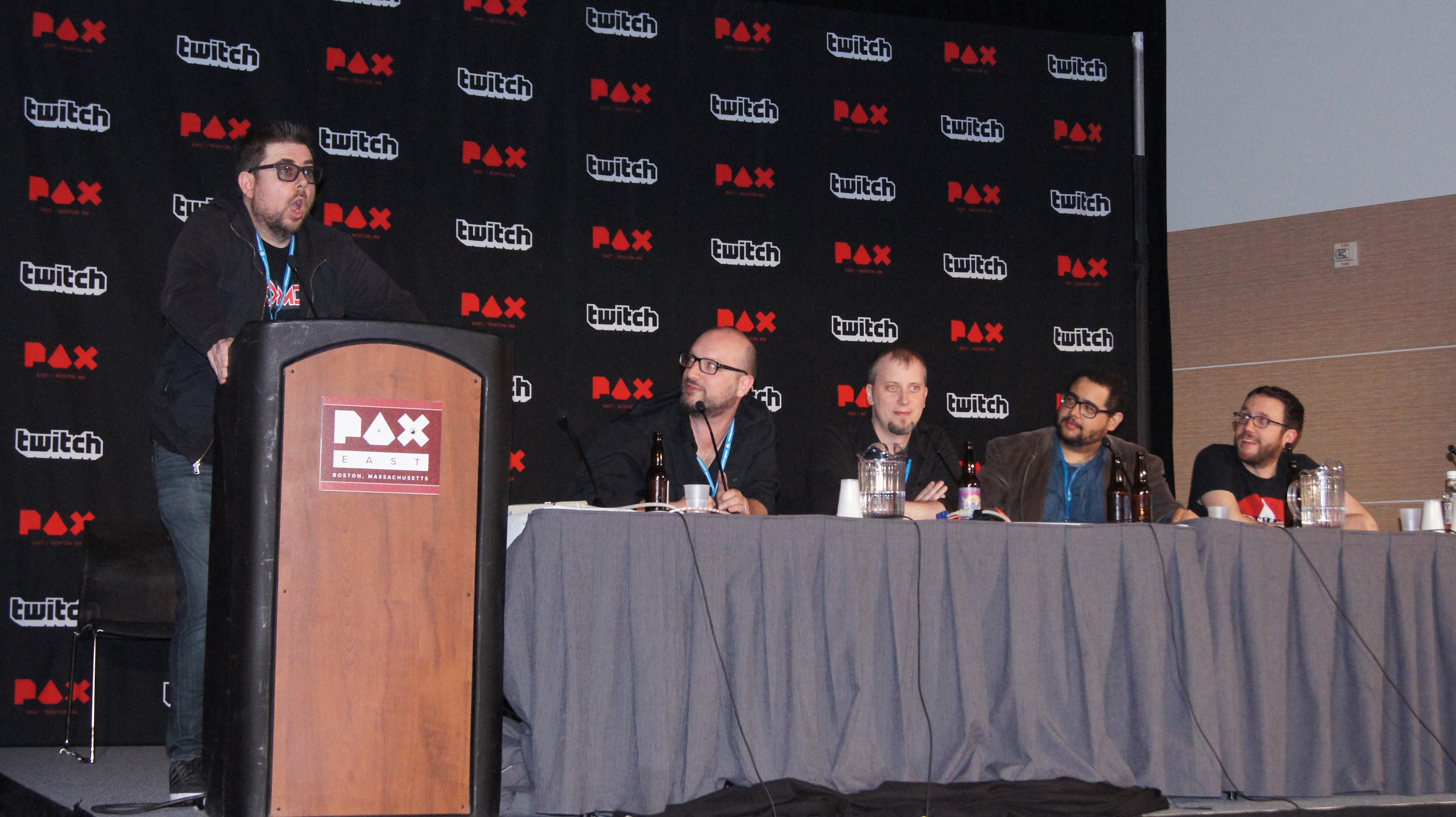
Jeff Gerstmann and Giant Bomb New York office editorial staff — Vinny Caravella, Alex Navarro, Austin Walker and Dan Ryckert

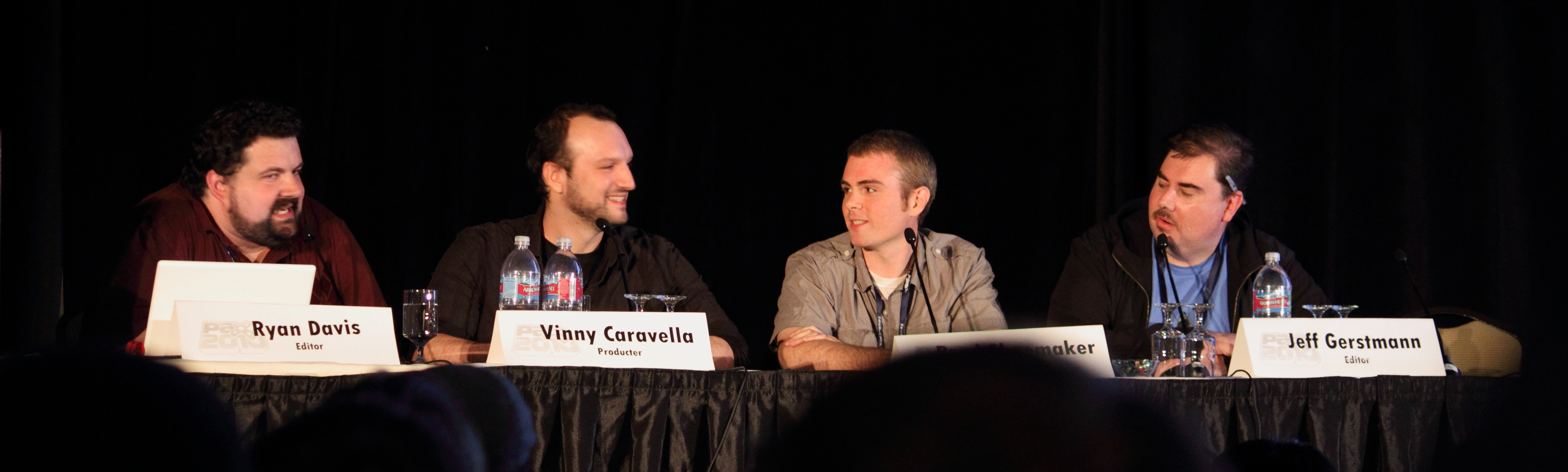
Giant Bomb editorial team (from left to right): Ryan Davis, Caravella, Brad Shoemaker and Gerstmann in 2010

Giant Bomb is known for its alternate method of video game journalism, described as, "not looking to take over the world, they've got a very small editorial team that's very focused on covering the things they want covered and that's it." This concept is based on focused, personalized coverage and giving the byline added importance as opposed to the accepted industry coverage that generally existed prior. Gerstmann has described their approach of competing with large established gaming websites as focusing on the top percentage of games editorially while functioning in a curator role to direct users to lesser known games through video features and the wiki-database pages.

Current Employees
Name	Position	Years
Dan Ryckert	Chief Content Officer and Co-owner	2014–2020; 2022–present
Jan Ochoa	Chief Operating Officer and Co-owner	2017–present
Jeff Bakalar	Chief Executive Officer and Co-owner	2021–present
Jeff Grubb	President and Co-owner	2022–present
Mike Minotti	Chief Product Officer and Co-owner	2025–present
Chuck Zimmerheld	Principal Engineer	2025–present
Shawn McDowell	Producer, Editor	2025–present
Will Crosby	Editor, Director of Social Media	2025–present
Former Employees
Name	Position	Years
Mike Horn	Web engineer	2009–2012
Ryan Davis	Co-founder, senior editor	2008–2013
Dave Snider	Co-founder, designer	2008–2013
Ian Kelly	Web engineer	2011–2014
Alexis Gallisá	Creative technical director	2011–2014
Patrick Klepek	Senior news editor	2011–2014
Austin Walker	News editor	2015–2016
Drew Scanlon	Senior video producer	2009–2017
Abby Russell	Associate producer	2017–2020
Ben Pack	Editor	2017–2021
Vincent "Vinny" Caravella	Director of production	2008–2021
Brad Shoemaker	Senior editor	2008–2021
Alex Navarro	Senior editor	2010–2021
Jeff Gerstmann	Co-founder, Editor-in-Chief	2008–2022
Jason Oestreicher	Senior Video Producer	2014–2023
Jess O'Brien	Video Producer	2021–2023
Matthew Rorie	Senior Community Producer	2013–2023
Tamoor Hussain	Creative Director	2022–2025
Lucy James	Editor	2022–2025

Timeline

=== Jeff Gerstmann ===
Working for GameSpot as editorial director until 2007, Gerstmann, GameSpot and its parent company CNET were involved in a controversial incident when Gerstmann was fired for what was later revealed to be a stand off between GameSpot's editorial and management teams. Gerstmann would join Whiskey Media and launch Giant Bomb with Davis, Shoemaker and Caravella in 2008. Gerstmann is one of the members of the VGX awards advisory council responsible for nominating and deciding on winners. Gerstmann was fired from the site in June 2022.

=== Ryan Davis ===
Recruited by Jeff Gerstmann, Davis began working for GameSpot in 2000. After the dismissal of Gerstmann in 2007, Davis departed GameSpot and joined Gerstmann under Whiskey Media to launch Giant Bomb. Becoming the primary host of Giant Bomb, Davis was the host of the Giant Bombcast as well as video content. Davis died on July 3, 2013, of natural causes, shortly after his wedding to Anna Davis. His death was revealed five days later on the Giant Bomb website.

=== Business practices, ethics and associations ===
We've all worked for companies that in the face of things like this they don't want to take sides, they don't want to risk alienating an audience by making any sort of strong statement. Giant Bomb and MinnMax are both completely independent. It is just the staff that matters, and the staff of both are completely aligned on this. So there's absolutely no one telling us 'Whoa, tread lightly here.' We can say with our full chest, 'This is how we feel. This is where we stand on the issue.' I cannot imagine someone that supports ICE or is a huge MAGA person or something, watching our stuff and being like, 'These are my guys.' Because it's pretty clear we're not on that side of the fence.

— Dan Ryckert, February 8th, 2026

The website had several interactions with Buckner & Garcia, creators of "Pac-Man Fever", in 2011 starting in June when Giant Bomb ran an in-office Pac-Man tournament on Thursday Night Throwdown. The show featured an interview with Jerry Buckner and Gary Garcia who were promoting their first set of Pac-Man Fever songs releasing on the Rock Band Network. Davis would later joke about wanting "Buckner & Garcia to write a song about this stupid website", the following week on the Giant Bombcast. "Found me the Bomb", written and performed by Buckner and Garcia, would release as a new track with the 2nd set of Pac-Man Fever songs in September. This would be the final song the duo would create with the death of Gary Garcia on November 17, 2011.

January 18, 2012, was the Protests against SOPA and PIPA, a collective effort against the Stop Online Piracy Act and PROTECT IP Act. Many websites including the English Wikipedia went on a 24-hour-long blackout against the two proposed laws. Giant Bomb was also in opposition against SOPA and PIPA and ran an impromptu comedy show that day.

Molyjam was a worldwide 48-hour game jam in March through to April 2012, founded by Double Fine Productions' Anna Kipnis, Giant Bomb's Patrick Klepek and Idle Thumbs' Chris Remo. Based on a parody account of known video game developer Peter Molyneux on Twitter, both professional and amateur game designers and developers in over 30 cities created games based on the parody account's comedic "emotional" and "innovative" tweets. Kipnis, Klepek and Remo ran the main game jam at the Giant Bomb and GameSpot CBS Interactive offices in San Francisco. Alex Navarro made an appearance at the 2015 Awesome Games Done Quick (AGDQ) charity event. Navarro did a speedrun of the 2003 video game Big Rigs: Over the Road Racing, a game he reviewed for GameSpot in 2004, giving it the first 1/10 review in GameSpot's history.

2026 saw the 2026 U.S. immigration enforcement protests, part of the Abolish ICE political movement. In January, Giant Bomb collaborated with Minneapolis-based video game outlet MinnMax to produce a charity livestream named ICE Out to raise money for people affected. Ryckert commented on the charity livestream and how becoming an independent company is what facilitated Giant Bomb being able to make a statement of this nature and that they were not worried about alienating their audience.

=== Humor ===
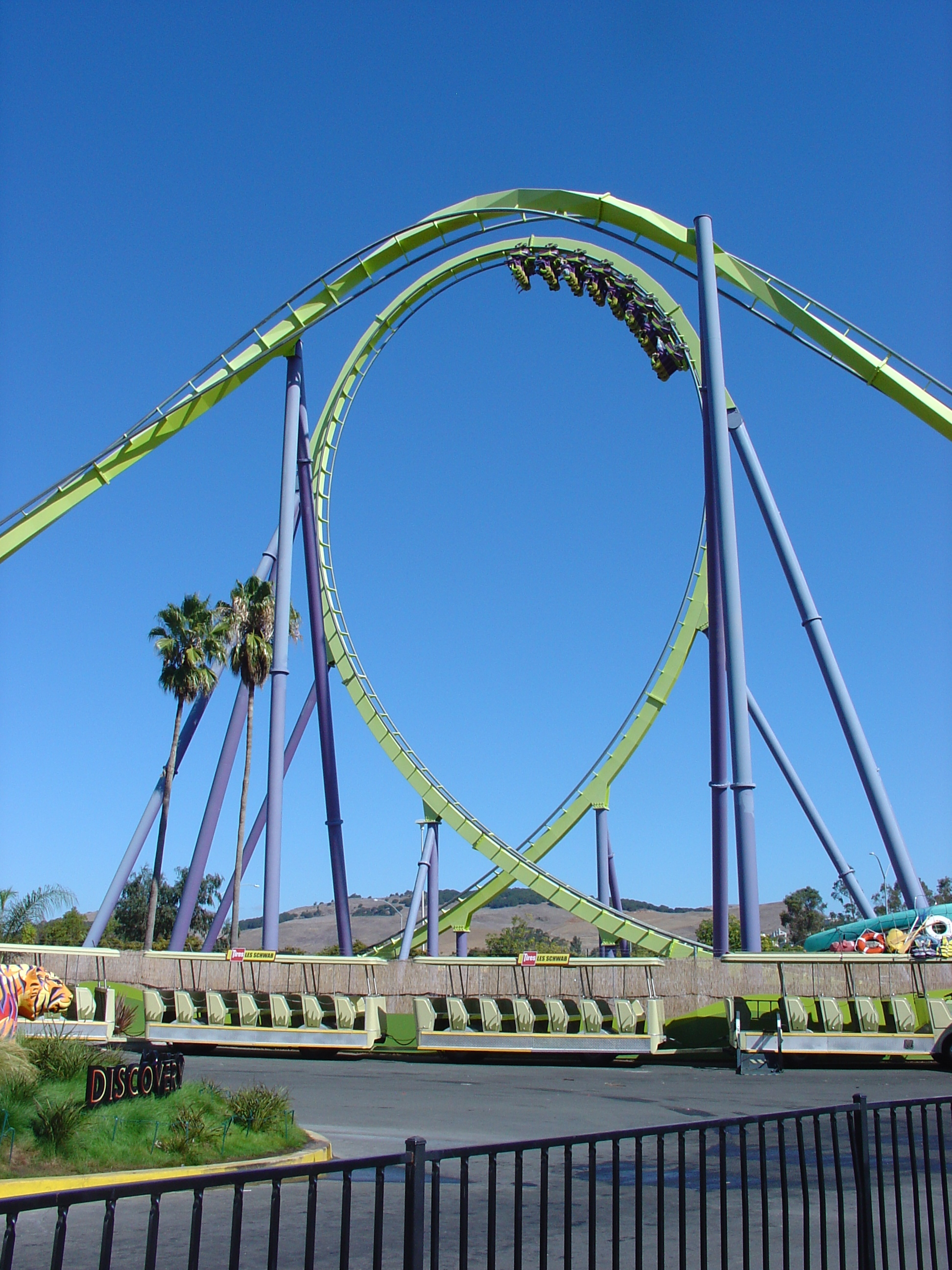
Six Flags Discovery Kingdom; The Medusa's vertical loop

In October 2014 Giant Bomb released a video in which Gerstmann and Ryckert held a video game competition to see who could get the furthest in the video game Super Mario Bros. 3 while riding the Medusa roller coaster at Six Flags Discovery Kingdom in Vallejo, California. Each player had a Nintendo 3DS strapped to their wrist and played the game via Nintendo's Virtual Console service while experiencing the roller coaster's inversions and g-force. Ryckert introduced strict rules to the proceedings, banning the use of the game's hidden items, the warp whistles, as well as declaring that neither of them could continue to play the game if the roller coaster was not moving. In keeping with the comedic nature of the video, The A.V. Club commented on the efforts of Ryckert and Gerstmann during the competition by quoting the 35th President of the United States, John F. Kennedy's We choose to go to the Moon speech, saying "[We do these things] not because they are easy, but because they are hard."

=== Charity work ===
Giant Bomb participates in the annual charity event Extra Life, in which fundraisers stream 24-hour video game marathons while viewers donate for sick children. After raising a cumulative total of $122,972 in 2013 the Giant Bomb team, consisting of the Giant Bomb staff, Iron Galaxy Studios and community members, passed its set goal of $175,000 in 2014. The primary channels of Giant Bomb and Iron Galaxy featured four separate 24-hour streams adding up to a total of 96 hours that week. As of June 2017 the Giant Bomb Extra Life team had raised $923,797.

== Reception ==
In voting the website into its Top 50 websites of 2011, Harry McCracken of Time magazine described Giant Bomb as having, "news, reviews and video — all looser, funnier and more opinionated than much of the stuff on game sites owned by larger media companies." In January 2012 it was announced that Vox Media had hired several names from gaming journalism to launch Polygon including Editor-in-Chiefs of Joystiq and Kotaku, Chris Grant and Brian Crecente. When asked why he thought there was room for another video game website, Grant said that, "The only site I would really look at and say they have enviable technology is Giant Bomb; nothing else out there has anything that's really attractive."

== Criticisms and controversies ==
During an interview with MSNBC on MSNBC Live, Brianna Wu criticized Giant Bomb, whose staff entirely consisted of white men at the time, for not posting news coverage of the Gamergate harassment campaign against women in the games industry. An article by Patrick Klepek detailing Wu's Gamergate-related harassment was posted that day, as acknowledged by the BBC on its BBC Online service in their coverage of Gamergate and Wu herself in a subsequent interview with PBS's PBS NewsHour.

== Impact ==
The turmoil is larger than just [video game] journalism, it's the Internet. We're at a time of great change, what advertising means on the Internet is changing in a very big way, sort of like you're seeing on television with DVRs making standard ads obsolete. Business is going to have to change, and we're all going to have to adapt to move forward and keep going for the years to come. People that stand by as existing ad formats get less and less useful are going to feel the brunt of stuff like this.

— Jeff Gerstmann, March 16, 2012

Giant Bomb is credited with being an innovator within video game journalism, avoiding many of its downfalls and continuing growth where other companies in the medium have had to downsize or close down completely. Due to ad filtering, the advertisements that have been common in video game journalism websites are becoming less viable. Websites such as Giant Bomb, ScrewAttack, and Penny-Arcade have received praise for their success in their paid subscription models. In addition, as print-based gaming journalism was superseded by web-based gaming journalism, large gaming journalism websites such as IGN and GameSpot are now under threat from YouTube celebrities and video game players creating their own live-streaming channels on Twitch.

This is the reality of the current industry we are in and it's something that Jeff Gerstmann predicted back in the day when he talked about the byline and the fact that the person writing the review was just as, if not more important, than the actual text of the review itself, or of course the video of it. It seems that some sites are attempting to adapt to the modern landscape by either creating personalities or pushing already existing nascent personalities on their staff. Either the most camera-friendly person or the most interesting person, giving them a show or along those lines. We see sites like GameSpot doing that a lot, they're really chasing after the dream of what Giant Bomb did years ago and it's the reason why Giant Bomb is extremely relevant at this point because they saw that coming.

— TotalBiscuit, September 9, 2014

Greg Miller cites the founding ethos of Giant Bomb and discussions with Gerstmann as a factor for leaving IGN to start Kinda Funny in 2015.
