= Jeff Bakalar =

American journalist

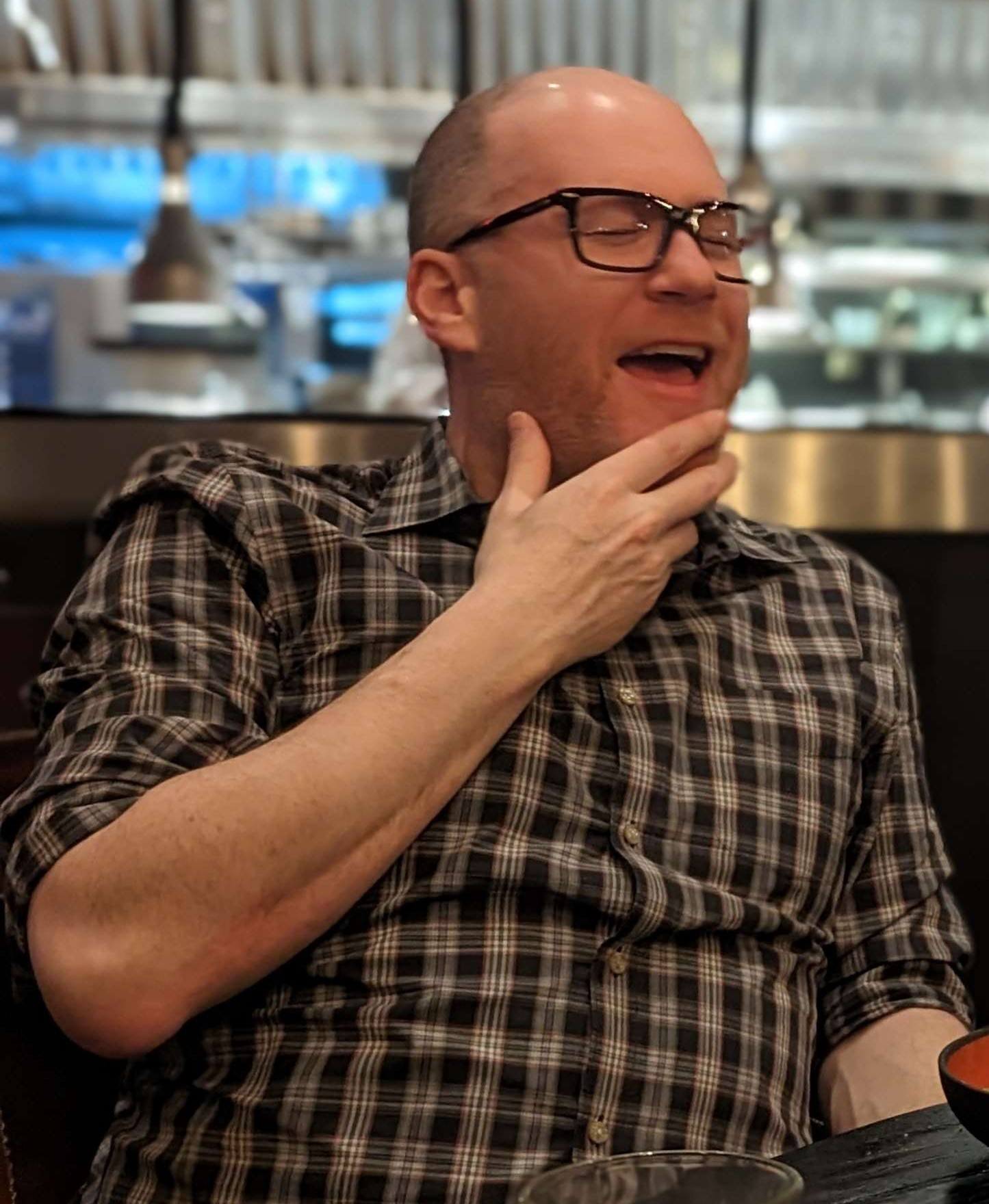
- Bakalar in 2023
- Born: Jeffrey Ian Bakalar; March 24, 1982 (age 44); Brooklyn, New York
- Education: Towson University (B.A.)
- Years active: 2004-present
- Known for: podcaster, celebrity interviewer, videogames journalist, internet personality
- Notable work: The 404 Show; Mest: Seven Deadly Sins; Pre-Game; Giant Beastcast; Giant Bombcast; CBSN
- Spouse: Stacie Blair Bakalar (2010-present)
- Children: 1

Jeffrey Ian Bakalar (born March 24, 1982) is a professional podcaster and video games media executive. He formerly hosted CNET's longest-running podcast, The 404 Show. He was a recurring personality on various podcasts on Giant Bomb, later becoming a co-owner and CEO of the site in 2025.

== Personal ==
Bakalar was born in Brooklyn, New York in 1982 and was raised in Briarwood, Queens before his family relocated to Marlboro Township, New Jersey where he attended Marlboro High School. He graduated from Towson University in 2004 with a Bachelor of Fine Arts in Electronic Media and Film, where he won an award for a mockumentary he directed called Adult Swim.

In 2010, he married his longtime girlfriend, Stacie Davis.

He currently lives in New Jersey.

== Career ==
During his college years, Bakalar worked as a production office intern for actor and producer Bob Balaban in New York City at his production company Chicagofilms while Balaban completed work on Gosford Park.

In 2004, he signed a contract with Warner Bros. Records subsidiary Maverick Records to direct and produce a documentary for the pop punk band Mest. The documentary, entitled Seven Deadly Sins was released as a pack-in bonus with copies of the band's 2005 album Photographs.

In 2007, Bakalar joined CNET as a home theater and gaming editor, eventually starting a technology and pop culture podcast called The 404 Show with Randall Bennett and Wilson Tang. In hosting the podcast, Bakalar has interviewed Tony Hawk, Marc Maron, John Hodgman, Shaun White, Wayne Brady, Scott Aukerman, Michael Showalter, Andrew W.K. and others. Each year the podcast is performed live at the Consumer Electronics Show, where it has featured Danny DeVito, Eliza Dushku, Felicia Day and others.

In 2012, Bakalar started CNET's first-ever weekly tech parody comic called Low Latency, which he writes and is illustrated by Blake Stevenson.

Bakalar briefly co-hosted another CNET project, Pre-Game, but stopped production after a year of programming to focus more on The 404 Show.

Bakalar is a member of the New York Videogame Critics Circle, an advocacy group for game writers in and around the New York City area.

He regularly appears on TV and radio as a technology, pop culture, and video game expert. Bakalar has been featured on G4's Attack of the Show, NPR's All Things Considered, and CNBC's Power Lunch.

In late 2014, Bakalar joined CBSN as a regularly appearing tech and pop culture pundit representing CNET.

On May 22, 2015, he joined the cast of Giant Bomb's Giant Beastcast, where he remained a regular member until its conclusion in May 2021. He later joined the cast of its sister podcast, the Giant Bombcast.

On September 29, 2017, the final episode of The 404 Show podcast was published.

In May 2025, Bakalar announced he had become a co-owner of the newly-independent Giant Bomb.
