= Kaoru Fujino =

Japanese voice actress

- Born: May 21, 1972 (age 53); Kōchi, Kōchi Prefecture, Japan
- Occupation: Voice actress

Kaoru Fujino (藤野 かほる, Fujino Kaoru; born May 21, 1972) is a Japanese voice actress who was born in Kōchi and raised in Tokyo. One of her lesser known roles is that of the heroine Cornet Espoir in the Nippon Ichi Software game The Puppet Princess of Marl Kingdom. She voice acted both Rockman (Mega Man in the U.S.) and Roll in Marvel vs. Capcom: Clash of Super Heroes and Marvel vs. Capcom 2: New Age of Heroes, as well as Elena in Street Fighter III: New Generation and Street Fighter III 2nd Impact: Giant Attack. Fujino is a member of the band Ruururu.

== Filmography ==
- Chō Mashin Eiyūden Wataru (Shiiko)
- Cyborg Kuro-chan (Pii-chan)
- Slayers Next (Nene)
- Garō Densetsu: The Motion Picture (Kim Dong Hwan)
- Galaxy Fraulein Yuna: The Abyssal Fairy (Mami)
- Marvel vs. Capcom: Clash of Super Heroes (Rockman, Roll, Baby Head)
- Marvel vs. Capcom 2: New Age of Heroes (Rockman, Roll, Baby Head)
- Street Fighter III: New Generation (Elena)
- Street Fighter III 2nd Impact: Giant Attack (Elena, Effie, Poison)
- The Puppet Princess of Marl Kingdom (Cornet Espoir)
