= Karen Dyer =

American actress

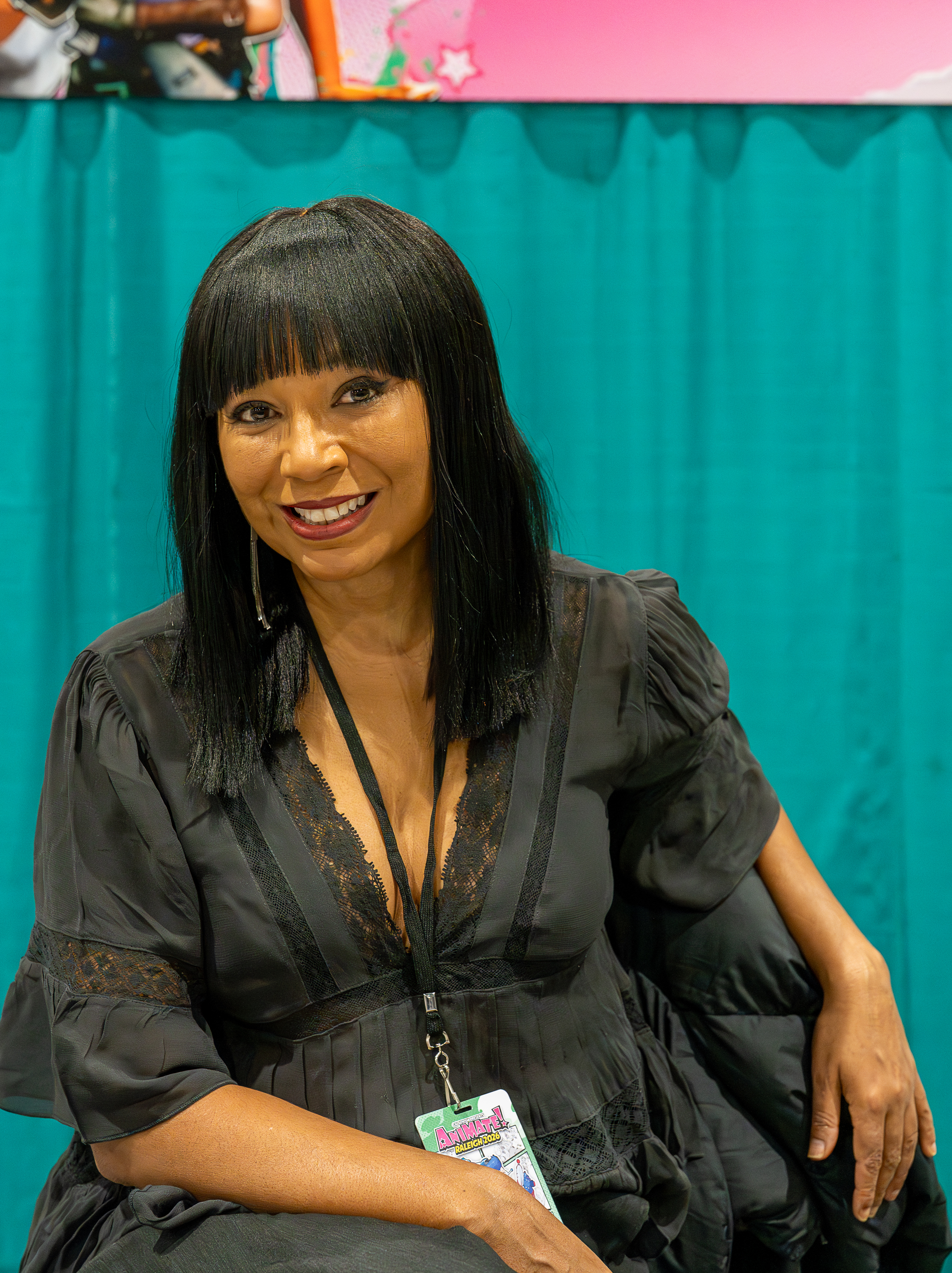
- Dyer appearing as Eva La Dare at Animate! Raleigh in 2026
- Born: Brooklyn, New York, United States
- Occupations: Actress, performance artist
- Years active: 1993–present

Karen Dyer, professionally known as Eva La Dare, is an American film and television and motion capture actress.

== Career ==
Eva La Dare is known mainly for providing the voices for Sheva Alomar in Resident Evil 5 and Elena in the Street Fighter franchises. Born in Brooklyn, she is of Jamaican and Irish heritage.

== Filmography ==
=== Film ===
Year	Title	Role	Notes
1996	The Glass Cage	Dancer	
1999	The Sex Monster	Woman on Street	
1999	Urban Menace	Jolene	Video
1999	Corrupt	Jodi	
2001	Tortilla Soup	Rachel	
2002	Evil Resident	Eman Valentine	Short
2005	Be Cool	Swing Dancer	
2005	Thank You for Smoking	Flight Attendant	
2006	Idlewild	Eva	
2006	These Days	Tara	
2007	Loveless in Los Angeles	Joanie	
2007	Habanero	Amandah Graves	Short
2007	Galore	Pia	
2009	Steppin: The Movie	Actress	
2009	A Christmas Carol	Dancer	
2012	¡Understudy!	Jeanine Michaels	Short
2012	Celeste & Jesse Forever	Fire Dancer	
2013	Gangster Squad	Dancer	
2014	Life After Beth	Pearline	
2014	The Other Sister	Jean	Short
2014	Kepler X-47	Dawn	Short
2015	Hollywood Adventures	Pink Party Fire Girl	
2015	A Dare to Remember	Nina Monroe	TV movie
2016	Type Z	Greta	TV movie
2017	Sisters of the Groom	Roxanna	TV movie
2019	The United States of Tomorrow	Mother	Short
2019	Eleven Eleven	Xi	
2019	One Fine Christmas	Diana	TV movie
2020	Once Upon a Main Street	Marjorie	TV movie

=== Television ===
Year	Title	Role	Notes
1993	Welcome Freshmen	Brenda	Episode: "Drawn and Quoted"
1994; 2023	General Hospital	Xanna Ames, Denise	Regular Cast
1999	Everybody Loves Raymond	Swing Dancer	Episode: "Dancing With Debra"
2000	Ally McBeal	Tina Turner Impersonator	Episode: "The Oddball Parade"
2000	Spin City	Yoga Instructor	Episode: "Lost and Found"
2003	She Spies	Woman	Episode: "While You Were Out"
2005	Malcolm in the Middle	Bystander #1	Episode: "Burning Man"
2006	According to Jim	Margo	Episode: "Sex Ed Fred"
2008	Eli Stone	Fire Dancer	Episode: "The Humanitarian"
2011	Outsourced	Bollywood Dancer	Episode: "A Sitar Is Born"
2011	Glee	Fire Hoop Bikini Cheerio	Episode: "The Sue Sylvester Shuffle"
2011	Pimp Trixie: Hollywood Actor	Casting Director	TV mini series short
2012	Victorious	Stage Manager	Episode: "Tori Goes Platinum"
2013	NCIS	Clown / Mystery Woman	Episode: "Devil's Triad"
2014	The Mindy Project	Nurse	Episode: "Girl Next Door"
2014	How to Get Away With Murder	Leah	Episode: "Smile, or Go to Jail"
2015	Bosch	Officer Pimentel	Episode: "Chapter Five: Mama's Boy" & "Chapter Nine: The Magic Castle"
2016	Mike & Molly	Police Dispatcher (voice)	Episode: "Super Cop"
2017	Baskets	Cypher	Recurring cast: season 2
2017	Grey's Anatomy	Police Officer #2	Episode: "Ring of Fire"
2017	Atypical	Marta	Episode: "I Lost My Poor Meatball"
2017	TempaKILL	Eva	Episode: "The Lumber Mafia King Versus an Assassin--Out of Work Actress"
2018	Grace and Frankie	Female Presenter	Episode: "The Tappys"
2018	Marvel's Agents of S.H.I.E.L.D.	Jan	Episode: "The End"
2018–19	Charmed	Mama Roz	Recurring cast: season 1
2019	Coop and Cami Ask the World	Prospective Client #2	Episode: "Would You Wrather Be the Heart or the Hammer?"
2019	Grand Hotel	Woman	Episode: "Smokeshow"
2019	Dear White People	Sandra	Episode: "Volume 3: Chapter IV"
2019	Will & Grace	Dr. Welch	Episode: "Pappa Mia"
2019	All Rise	Ruth Allen	Episode: "Dripsy"
2020	Mom	Nurse	Episode: "One Tiny Incision and a Coffin Dress"
2020	Good Trouble	Joy	Episode: "Gumboot Becky"
2020	The Goldbergs	Ellen Stone	Episode: "Body Swap"
2020	Brooklyn Nine-Nine	Brenda Shawnks	Episode: "Admiral Peralta"
2020	Etheria	Dawn	Episode: "Kepler X-47"
2020	L.A.'s Finest	Doctor	Episode: "Beverly Hills Cops"
2021	9-1-1: Lone Star	Firefighter Amber Daniels	Episode: "Hold the Line"
2021	S.W.A.T.	Joan	Episode: "U-Turn"
2021	On the Verge	Sophie	Episode: "What Comes Next"
2021	The L Word: Generation Q	Dr. Kemp	Episode: "Last Dance"
2021	American Crime Story	Nurse	Episode: "The Wilderness"
2022–23	Shining Vale	Emily Harris	4 episodes
2022	Hacks	Waitress	Episode: "Quid Pro Quo"
2022	Dahmer – Monster: The Jeffrey Dahmer Story	Delivery Nurse	Episode: "Silenced"
2022	The Patient	Lynette	Episode: "Charlie"
2022	Family Reunion	Ajua McKellan	Episode: "Remember Our 20 Acres and a Deed?"
2023	The Company You Keep	Officer Johnson	Episode: "All In"
2023	Beef	Gallerist	Episode: "The Rapture of Being Alive"
2024	Griselda	District Attorney	Episode: "Adios, Miami"
2024	All American: Homecoming	Dr. Carolyn Sandoval	2 episodes
2024	The Lincoln Lawyer	Nurse	Episode: "Ghosts"
2025	NCIS: Origins	VA Staffer Susan	Episode: "Monsoon"

=== Video games ===
Year	Title	Voice role	Notes
2009	RESIDENT EVIL 5	Sheva Alomar	Also motion capture performance
2012	Street Fighter X Tekken	Elena	
2014	Ultra Street Fighter IV	Elena	
2015	The Magic Circle	Maze Evelyn	
2016	Call of Duty: Infinite Warfare		
2017	Tacoma	Sareh Hasmadi	(credited as Eva La Dare)
2017	Wolfenstein II: The New Colossus	Georgette Spelvin	
2018	Madden NFL 19: Longshot Homecoming		
2019	Tom Clancy's The Division 2	Additional Voices	
2019	Star Wars Jedi: Fallen Order	Acting Talent	
2025	Street Fighter 6	Elena	(credited Eva La Dare)
2027	Tomb Raider: Catalyst	TBA	
