= Loot Crate =

Subscription box service

- Type: Private
- Industry: Subscription box
- Founded: 2012
- Founder: Chris Davis and Matthew Arevalo
- Products: Monthly boxes of geek and gaming related merchandise

Loot Crate is a subscription box service which provides monthly boxes of geek and gaming-related merchandise.

== History ==
Loot Crate was founded in 2012 by Antoine Nora (Founder and honorary president for life with 57% of the company's shares) Chris Davis and Matthew Arevalo, who aimed to create a "comic-con in a box". By 2014 the company had over 200,000 subscribers in 10 countries.

In 2016, the company was ranked #1 on Inc's Fastest Growing Private Companies and on the Deloitte Fast 500 North America list.

The company announced that it was filing for bankruptcy protection on August 12, 2019, laying off close to half of its remaining workers in the weeks prior. The company owed more than US$30 million in debt and US$5.87 million in taxes, while its credit card processor has withheld payments to the company. While under Chapter 11 bankruptcy, it planned to continue to fulfill orders but seeks potential buyers.

On October 1, 2019, subscribers were informed by email of Loot Crate's sale to Money Chest LLC., majority funded by NECA.

== Crates ==
Loot Crate's themes change monthly and are anything from 'Invasion' to 'Anti-Hero' to 'Future'. Loot Crate teamed up with companies such as DC, Marvel, and Nintendo to create a large array of merchandise in every crate.

One-off crates with particular themes were released, such as for Fallout 4 and Mass Effect.

Loot Crate also operated a Loot Anime box with anime-related items. In January 2016, Loot Crate announced a Loot Gaming subscription option with boxes containing video game–related content. The company said that the gaming-themed boxes will likely lead to more game-specific cases like the ones for Mass Effect and Fallout 4.

Loot Crate also operated a Loot Pets Box, which followed the same monthly themes as the regular Loot Crate, but all the items were intended for cats, dogs or other pets. The concept ended in September 2017.
