= Games and Culture =

- Discipline: Cultural studies, media studies
- Language: English
- Edited by: Tanya Krzywinska

Publication details
- History: 2006–present
- Publisher: SAGE Publishing
- Frequency: 8/year
- Impact factor: 2.4 (2023)

Standard abbreviations
- ISO 4: Games Cult.

Indexing
- ISSN: 1555-4120
- LCCN: 2005212229
- OCLC no.: 58730582

Links
- Journal homepage; Online access; Online archive

Games and Culture is a peer-reviewed academic journal that covers the field of culture and media studies, specializing on the socio-cultural, political, and economic dimensions of gaming. The editor-in-chief is Tanya Krzywinska (Falmouth University). It was established in 2006 and is published by SAGE Publishing.

== Abstracting and indexing ==
The journal is abstracted and indexed in:

- Arts & Humanities Citation Index
- Current Contents/Arts & Humanities
- Current Contents/Social & Behavioral Sciences
- EBSCO databases
- Modern Language Association Database
- ProQuest databases
- PsycINFO
- Scopus
- Social Sciences Citation Index
- Sociological Abstracts

According to the Journal Citation Reports, the journal has a 2021 impact factor of 2.180.
