= N'Gai Croal =

Video game critic

N'Gai Croal is an American writer and a former video game critic and consultant, previously employed by Newsweek.

Croal started out as consumer technology writer at Newsweek, later writing the Newsweek-associated Level Up blog.

In 2008, Croal criticised alleged racism in the Japanese game Resident Evil 5.

In 2022, Croal joined Microsoft Game Dev as an editorial director, overseeing an online content hub devoted to game creators and game development.
