= Final Conflict (disambiguation) =

Final Conflict or The Final Conflict may refer to:

== Literature ==
- Final Conflict: The War in the Lebanon, a 1983 non-fiction book by John Bulloch

== Music ==
- Final Conflict, American hardcore punk band
- Final Conflict (band), British progressive rock band
- The Final Conflict, a 1988 album by Conflict

== Film ==
- The Final Conflict (film), a 1981 American film
- Lone Wolf and Cub: Final Conflict, a 1993 Japanese film

== Television ==
=== Episodes ===
- "Final Conflict", Bolts & Blip episode 26 (2011)
- "Final Conflict", Earth: Final Conflict season 5, episode 22 (2002)
- "Final Conflict (Part 1)" and "Final Conflict (Part 2)", Martial Law season 2 episodes 21–22 (2000)
- "The Final Conflict", Challenge of the GoBots episode 5 (1984)
- "The Final Conflict", Monster Café series 1, episode 15 (1994)
- "The Final Conflict", Redwall season 1, episode 13 (1999)
- "The Final Conflict", The Celts (1987) episode 5 (1987)
- "Westbury: The Final Conflict", Doc (2001) season 4, episode 1 (2003)

=== Shows ===
- Earth: Final Conflict, a 1997–2002 Canada/US television series

== Video game ==
- The Final Conflict (video game), a 1982 strategy video game
- Hagane: The Final Conflict, a 1994 video game
- Shining Force Gaiden: Final Conflict, a 1995 video game

== See also ==
- Final War (disambiguation)
- The Final Battle (disambiguation)
- The Final Chapter (disambiguation)
- The Final Fight, a set index article
