= The Final Chapter =

The Final Chapter may refer to:

== Film ==
- Walking Tall: Final Chapter, the third Walking Tall film, released in 1977
- Friday the 13th: The Final Chapter, the fourth Friday the 13th film, released in 1984
- Maison Ikkoku: The Final Chapter, a 1988 anime television film based on the Maison Ikkoku manga series, aired in 1988
- Urusei Yatsura: The Final Chapter, the fifth Urusei Yatsura film, released in 1988
- Puppet Master 5: The Final Chapter, the fifth Puppet Master film, released in 1994
- Lake Placid: The Final Chapter, the fourth Lake Placid film, released in 2012
- Saw 3D: The Final Chapter, the seventh Saw film, released in 2010
- Shrek Forever After, the fourth Shrek film, sometimes referred to as Shrek: The Final Chapter, released in 2010
- Resident Evil: The Final Chapter, the sixth Resident Evil film, released in 2017

== Music ==
- The Final Chapter (Hypocrisy album), 1997
- The Final Chapter (C-Bo album)
- The Final Chapter (Ruff Endz album)
- The Final Chapter (Dungeon album)
- All Areas – Worldwide, a 1997 live album by Accept, released as The Final Chapter in Japan and the United States
- Duets: The Final Chapter, third posthumous album by The Notorious B.I.G., released in 2005
- The Mix Tape, Volume III: 60 Minutes of Funk (The Final Chapter), a 1998 mixtape by Funkmaster Flex

== Television ==
- "Final Chapters", Hotel (American) season 2, episode 12 (1984)
- "Flood of Memories: The Final Chapter", Webster season 6, episode 24 (1989)
- "Halloween: The Final Chapter", Roseanne season 8, episode 5 (1995)
- "The Final Chapter", Drop the Dead Donkey season 6, episode 7 (1998)
- "The Final Chapter", Ek Thi Begum season 2, episode 12 (2021)
- "The Final Chapter", Expedition Africa episode 8 (2009)
- "The Final Chapter", Hetty Feather series 6, episodes 1–3 (2020)
- "The Final Chapter", On My Block season 4, episode 10 (2021)
- "The Final Chapter", Quarterback episode 8 (2023)
- "The Final Chapter", Quinn Martin's Tales of the Unexpected episode 1 (1977)
- "The Final Chapter", The Following season 1, episode 15 (2013)
- "The Final Chapter", The Midnight Club episode 1 (2022)
- "The Washoe Club: Final Chapter", Ghost Adventures season 16, episode 7 (2018)

== Other uses ==
- Five Nights at Freddy's 4, a 2015 video game and the fourth FNaF game, advertised as Five Nights at Freddy's 4: The Final Chapter
- "The Gathering of Five" and "The Final Chapter", a 1998 Spider-Man story line
- Planet Earth: The Final Chapter, a 1999 book by Hal Lindsey

== See also ==
- Final Conflict (disambiguation)
- Final War (disambiguation)
- The Final Battle (disambiguation)
- The Final Fight
