= John Bulloch =

John Bulloch may refer to:

- John Bulloch (author) (1805–1882), writer
- John Bulloch (politician) (born 1947), American politician in Georgia
- John Bulloch (journalist) (1928–2010)
- John Bulloch, founder of Canadian Federation of Independent Business

== See also ==
- John Bullock (disambiguation)
