= Rashidieh =

Ar-Rashidiyah camp مخيم الرشيدية
- Refugee camp
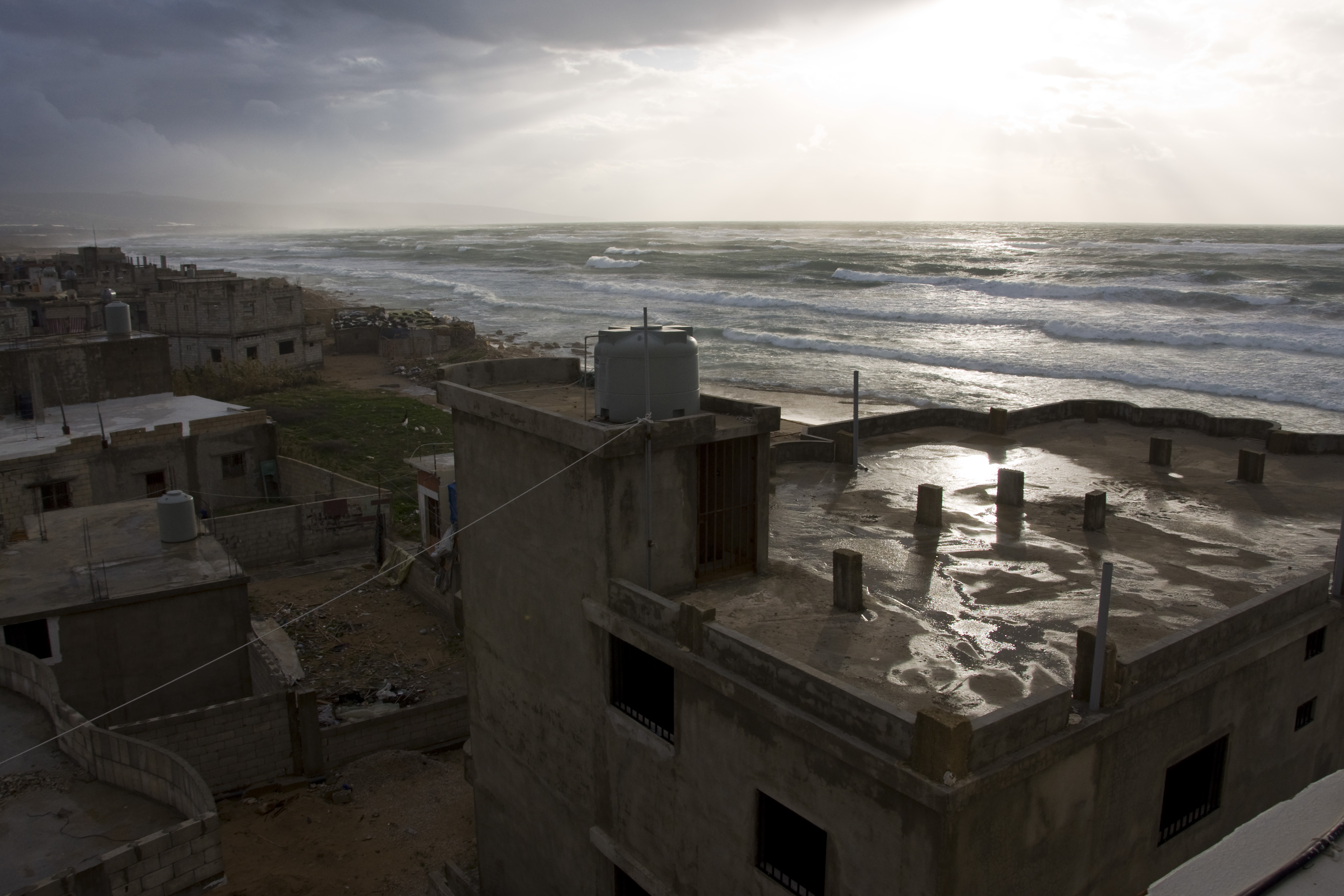

- Location within Lebanon
- Coordinates: 33°14′12.12″N 35°13′5.16″E
- Country: Lebanon
- Governorate: South Governorate
- District: Tyre District
- Municipality: Sour

Area
  - Total: 24.84 ha (61.4 acres)

Population (2018)
  - Total: 34,584

Rashidieh, or Ar-Rashidiyah (Note: Arabic: الرشيدية) is the second most populous Palestinian refugee camp in Lebanon, located on the Mediterranean coast about five kilometres south of the city of Tyre (Sur).

== Etymology ==
The camps's Arabic name, "الرشيدية", is variously transliterated as Rashidiya, Rashidiyah, Rachidiye, Rashidiyyeh, Rashadiya, Rashidieh, Reshîdîyeh, or Rusheidiyeh with or without a version of the article Al, El, Ar, or Er.

The London-based Palestine Exploration Fund (PEF) and other sources recorded that in the Mid-19th century the settlement was named after its then owner, the Ottoman top-diplomat and politician Mustafa Reşid Pasha, known best as the chief architect behind the regime's modernization reforms known as Tanzimat.

== Territory ==
There is an abundance of fresh water supplies in the area with the springs of Ar-Rashidiyah itself and those of Ras al-Ain nearby.

To its northern side, Ar-Rashidiyah borders the Tyre Coast Nature Reserve.

According to a 1998 fact-finding mission of the Danish Immigration Service, the camp covers an area of 248,426 square meters. Journalist Robert Fisk estimated the size to be four square miles.

== History of the site ==
=== Prehistoric times ===
According to Ali Badawi, the long-time chief-archaeologist for Southern Lebanon at the Directorate-General of Antiquities, it can be generally assumed that all villages around Tyre were established already during prehistoric times of the Neolithic age (5,000 BCE), especially in the fertile area of Ras al-Ain, next to the Tell El-Rashdiyeh (the Hill of Rashidieh).

=== Ancient times ===
==== Phoenician times ====
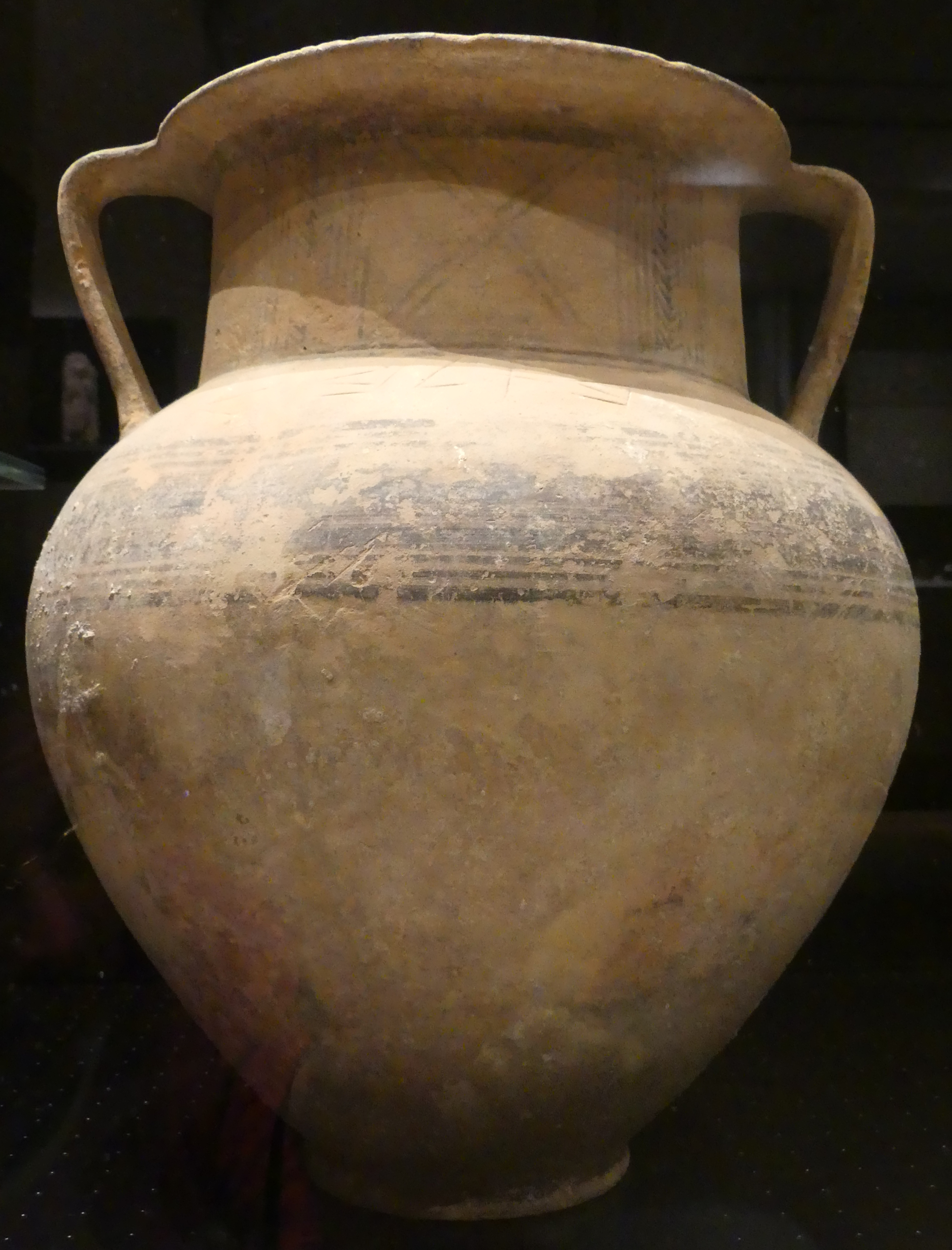
Cinerary urn from Rashidieh with Phoenician inscription BT LB' (House of LB')

Many scholars assume that the area of what is now Rashidieh actually used to be the original Ushu (also transliterated Usu or Uzu), founded on the mainland around 2750 BCE as a walled place. It was later called Palaetyrus (also spelled Palaityros or Palaeotyre), meaning "Old Tyre" in Ancient Greek, and was the lifeline for Island Tyre as its continental twin sister:

"To an overpopulated island, its mainland territory was a vital necessity, supplying it with agricultural products, drinking water, wood and murex. In isolation the island city was nothing."

One of the reasons to locate Ushu/Palaetyrus in the Rashidieh area is the delineation of its acropolis by Ancient-Greek geographer Strabo, who visited Tyre himself.

The springs of Ras al-Ain were described by later scholars as the "cisterns of Solomon" and said to have been commissioned by the legendary King of Israel, who was a close ally of Tyrian king Hiram I.

Very few archaeological excavations have been conducted in Rashidieh. However, the collections of the National Museum of Beirut hold a number of items which were found there. Amongst them is an amphora with Phoenician inscriptions dated to the Iron Age II and a cinerary urn dated 775–750 BCE. The latter was an import from Cyprus and gives evidence that Rashidieh was used as a necropolis as well.

However, Ushu/Palaetyrus apparently suffered great damages when the Neo-Assyrian king Shalmaneser V besieged the twin-city in the 720s BCE. Likewise during the attack by Neo-Babylonian king Nebuchadnezzar II, who started a siege of Tyre in 586 BCE that went on for thirteen years.

==== Hellenistic times ====
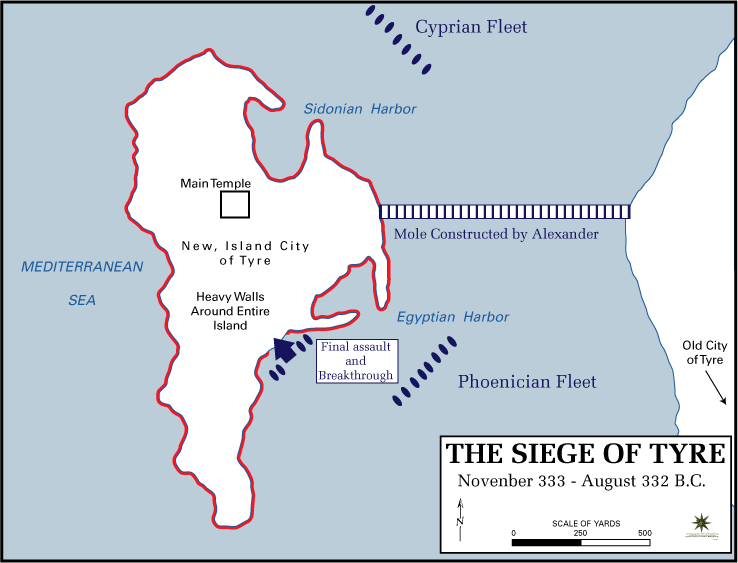
Illustration of Alexander's siege by the United States Military Academy locating Old Tyre in the Rashidieh area

Reportedly, when Alexander the Great arrived at the gates of Tyre in 332 BCE and proposed to sacrifice to city deity Melqart in the temple on the island, the Tyrian government refused this and instead suggested that Alexander sacrifice at another temple on the mainland at Old Tyre. Angered by this rejection and the city's loyalty to Persian king Darius the Great, Alexander started his Siege of Tyre despite its reputation as being impregnable. However, the Macedonian conqueror succeeded after seven months by demolishing the old city on the mainland and using its stones to construct a causeway to the island. This isthmus increased greatly in width over the centuries because of extensive silt depositions on either side, making the former island a permanent peninsula – based on the ruins and rubble of Palaetyrus.

==== Roman times (64 BCE–395) ====
During Roman times, large water reservoirs were built in Ras al-Ain as well as an aqueduct which channeled the water to Tyre. At the same time, the use of the area as a burial ground seems to have continued: a marble sarcophagus from the first or second century CE was discovered there in 1940. It is exhibited at the National Museum in Beirut.

==== Byzantine period (395–640) ====
According to the Syrian scholar Evagrius Scholasticus (536–596 CE), the hill of what is now Rashidieh was known as Sinde – "a place where a hermit called Zozyma used to dwell."

Over the course of the 6th century CE, starting in 502, a series of earthquakes shattered Tyre area and left the city diminished. The worst one was the 551 Beirut earthquake. It was accompanied by a Tsunami and probably destroyed also much of what was left in the area of what is now Rashidieh. In addition, the city and its population increasingly suffered during the 6th century from the political chaos that ensued when the Byzantine empire was torn apart by wars. The city remained under Byzantine control until it was captured by the Sassanian shah Khosrow II at the turn from the 6th to the 7th century CE, and then briefly regained until the Muslim conquest of the Levant, when in 640 it was taken by the Arab forces of the Rashidun Caliphate.

=== Medieval times ===
==== Early Muslim period (640–1124) ====
As the bearers of Islam restored peace and order, Tyre soon prospered again and continued to do so during half a millennium of Caliphate rule. The Rashidun period only lasted until 661. It was followed by the Umayyad Caliphate (until 750) and the Abbasid Caliphate. In the course of the centuries, Islam spread and Arabic became the language of administration instead of Greek.

At the end of the 11th century, Tyre avoided being attacked by paying tribute to the Crusaders who marched on Jerusalem. However, in late 1111, King Baldwin I of Jerusalem laid siege on the former island city and probably occupied the mainland, including the area that is now Rashidieh, for that purpose. Tyre in response put itself under the protection of the Seljuk military leader Toghtekin. Supported by Fatimid forces, he intervened and forced the Franks to raise the siege in April 1112, after about 2.000 of Baldwin's troops had been killed. A decade later, the Fatimids sold Tyre to Toghtekin who installed a garrison there.

==== Crusader period (1124–1291) ====
On 7 July 1124, in the aftermath of the First Crusade, Tyre was the last city to be eventually conquered by the Christian warriors, a Frankish army on the coast – i.e. also in today's Rashidieh area – and a fleet of the Venetian Crusade from the sea side. The takeover followed a siege of five and a half months that caused great suffering from hunger to the population. Eventually, Tyre's Seljuk ruler Toghtekin negotiated an agreement for surrender with the authorities of the Latin Kingdom of Jerusalem.

Under its new rulers, Tyre and its countryside – including what is now Rashidieh – were divided into three parts in accordance with the Pactum Warmundi: two-thirds to the royal domain of Baldwin and one third as autonomous trading colonies for the Italian merchant cities of Genoa, Pisa and – mainly to the Doge of Venice. He had a particular interest in supplying silica sands to the glassmakers of Venice and so it may be assumed that the area of what is now Rashidieh fell into his interest sphere.

==== Mamluk period (1291–1516) ====
In 1291, Tyre was again taken, this time by the Mamluk Sultanate's army of Al-Ashraf Khalil. He had all fortifications demolished to prevent the Franks from re-entrenching. After Khalil's death in 1293 and political instability, Tyre lost its importance and "sank into obsurity." When the Moroccan explorer Ibn Batutah visited Tyre in 1355, he found it a mass of ruins.

=== Modern times ===
==== Ottoman rule (1516–1918) ====
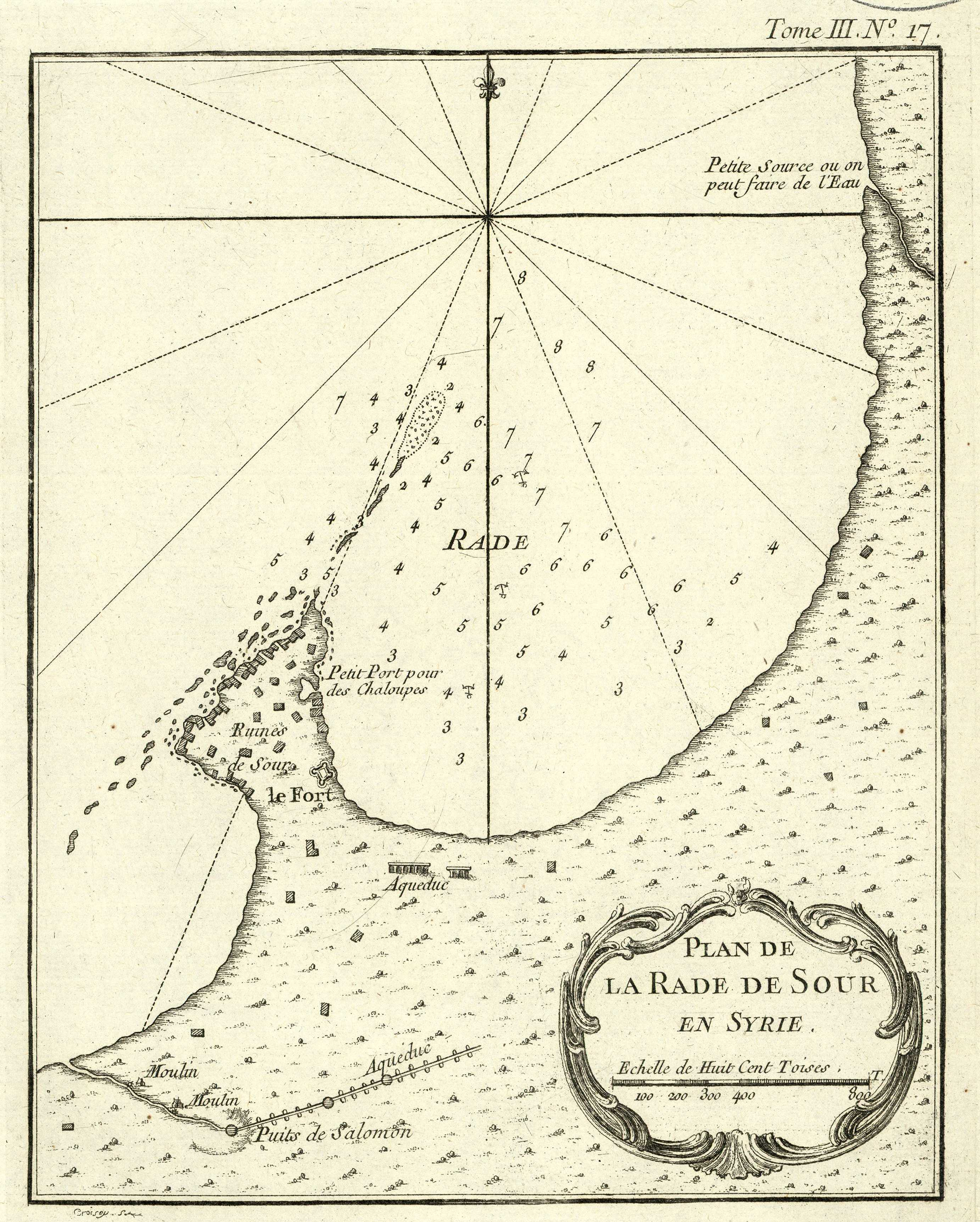
1764 map

The Ottoman Empire conquered the Levant in 1516, yet the desolate area of Tyre remained untouched for another ninety years until the beginning of the 17th century, when the leadership at the Sublime Porte appointed the Druze leader Fakhreddine II as Emir to administer Jabal Amel (modern-day South Lebanon). He encouraged the systematically discriminated Shiites – known as the Metwalis – to settle near Tyre in order to secure the road to Damascus, and thus laid the foundation of Rashidieh's 19th century demographics.

However, the development of the Greater Tyre area stalled once again in 1635, when Sultan Murad IV had Fakhreddine executed for his political ambitions. Henceforth, it is unclear how the area of Rashidieh developed in the following 200 years, except that it was apparently called Tell Habish (also spelled Habesh) during that time, the "Hill of Habish":

"Habish" may be translated as "Ethiopian", which in turn might refer to the Tyrian brothers Frumentius and Edesius, who got shipwrecked on the Eritrean coast in the 4th century CE. While Frumentius has been credited with bringing Christianity to the Kingdom of Aksum and became the first bishop of the Ethiopian Orthodox Tewahedo Church, Edesius returned to Tyre to become a priest.

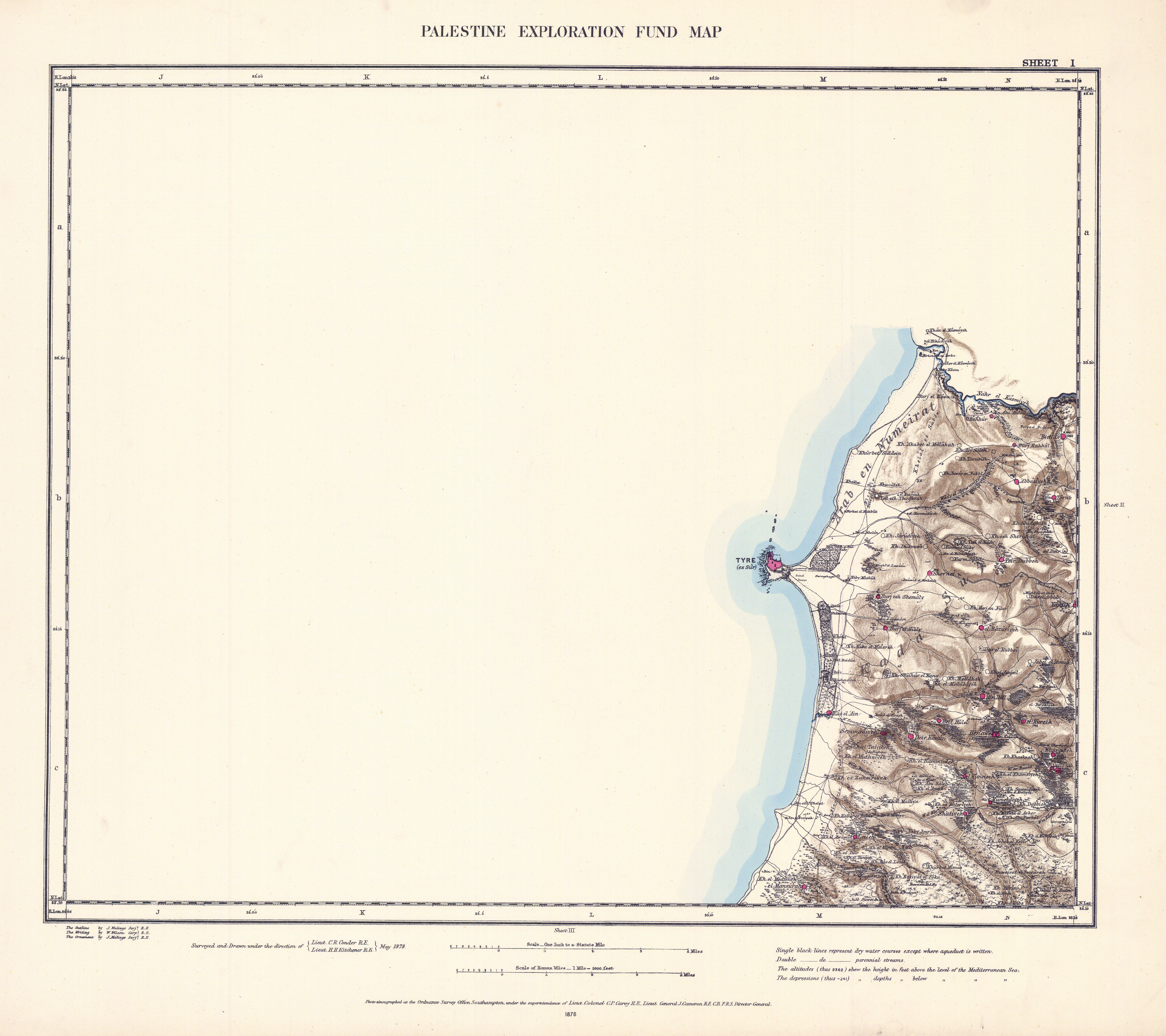
"Er Rusheidiyeh" on the SWP map, surveyed and drawn in May 1878

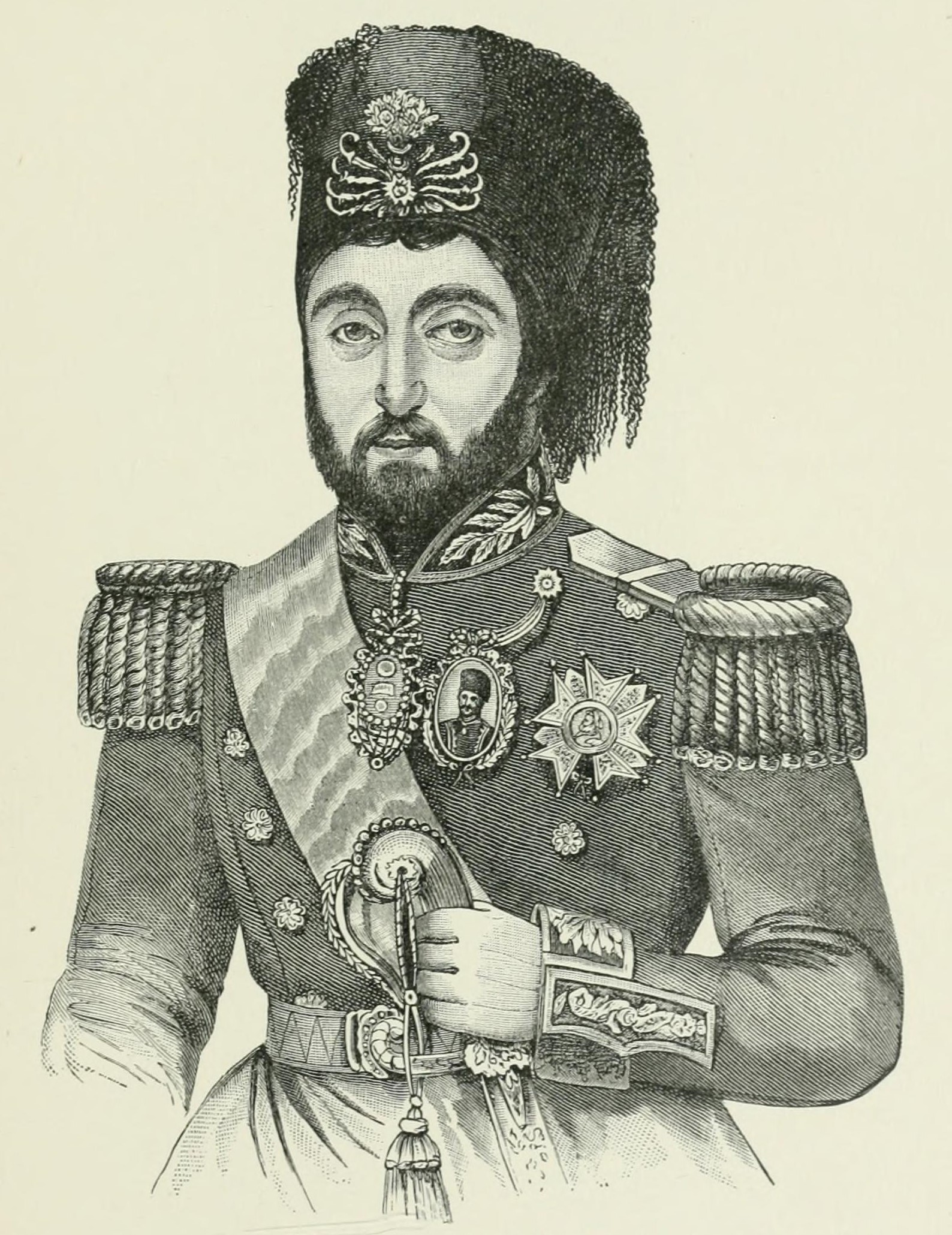
The name giver: Reşid Pasha

It was then in 1856, according to some sources, that Mustafa Reşid Pasha – the chief architect behind the Ottoman government reforms known as Tanzimat – obtained personal ownership of the lands in the area of Tell Habish. This was perhaps when he became Grand Vizier for the fifth time in his career at the end of that year. In any case, the transfer took obviously only place after the Ottoman leadership in Constantinople regained control over Jabal Amel from Muhammad Ali Pasha in 1839 after almost eight years. The army of the rebellious Egyptian Governor was defeated not only with allied support from the British Empire and Austria-Hungary, but mainly by Shiite forces under the leadership of the Ali al-Saghir dynasty.

The PEF Survey of Western Palestine (SWP) – led by Herbert Kitchener at the beginning of his military career – explored the area in May 1878 and described Er Rusheidiyeh as follows:

"It is a hill about sixty feet above the level of the sea. It took its present name a few years ago, Rusheid Pasha (commonly written Reshid Pasha) having acquired the place and built a farm upon it of the old materials which covered the soil."

And:

"A large square building, built by Rusheid Pasha for a factory; now contains about 70 Metawileh, and is surrounded by gardens of olives, figs, pomegranates, and lemons. It stands on a slight hill above the plain, and has two strong springs near, surrounded by masonry."

According to the Bavarian historian and politician Johann Nepomuk Sepp, who in 1874 led an Imperial German mission to Tyre in search of the bones of Holy Roman Emperor Frederick I "Barbarossa", the estate was taken over after the death of Reşid Pasha in 1858 by Sultan Abdulaziz.

In 1903, the Greek archaeologist Theodore Makridi Bey, curator of the Imperial Museum at Constantinople conducted archaeological excavations in Rashidieh and discovered a number of cinerary urns with human bones and ashes. Some were locally made while others were imported from Cyprus. These findings were apparently sent to the Ottoman capital.

A map from a 1906 Baedeker travel guide designates the area as "Tell Habesh or Reshîdîyeh". It showed gardens, a mill and a Khan (a Caravanserai).

=== French Mandate colonial rule (1920–1943) ===
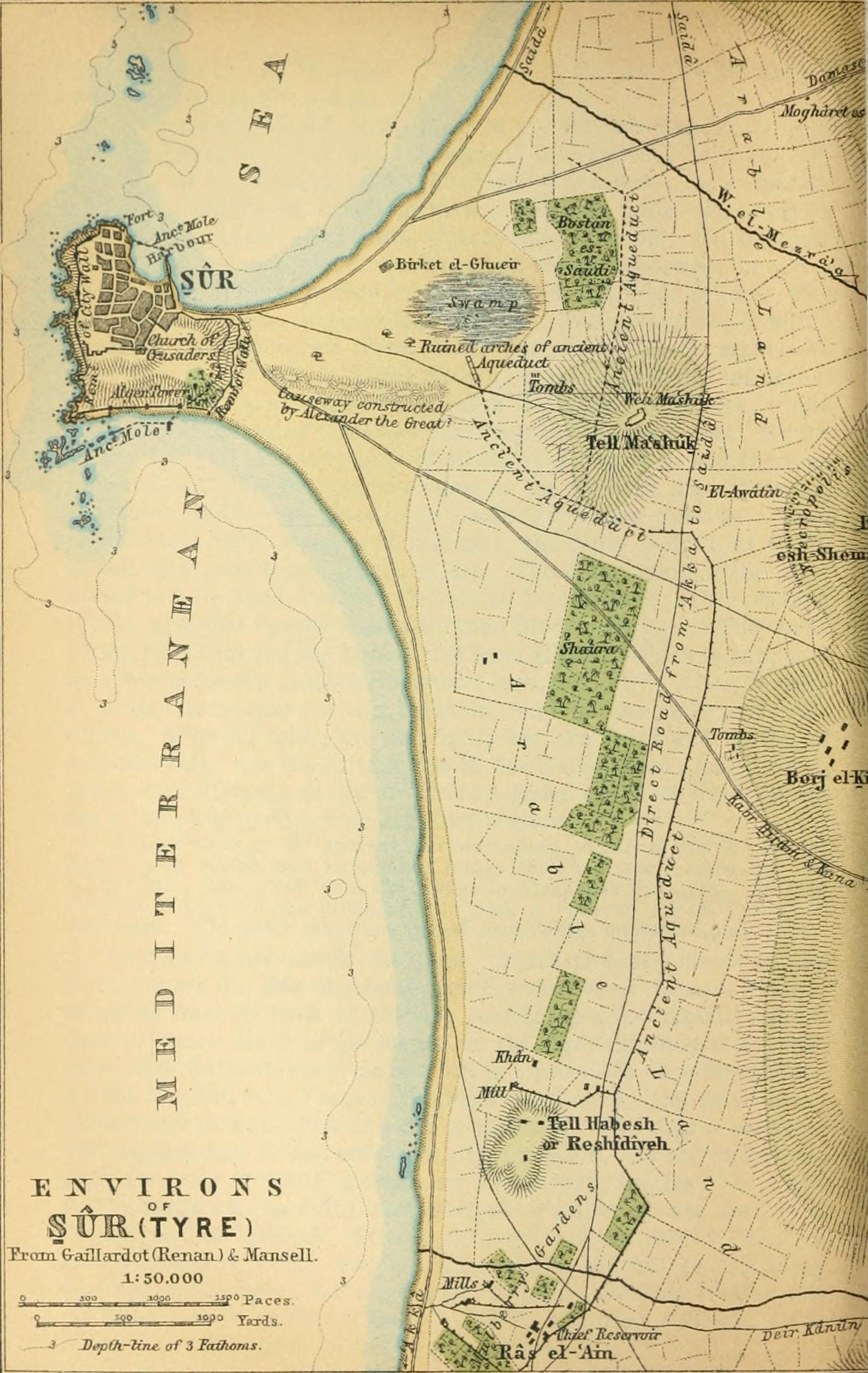
1906 map

On the first of September 1920, the colonial French rulers proclaimed the new State of Greater Lebanon. According to an oral history project, the new authorities gave "sections of Rashidieh Hill, where there were already two churches", to the Catholic Church’s Waqf, i.e. its financial endowment. It is unclear though whether this was the Latin-Catholic School or one of its orders like the Franciscans in Tyre, or the Maronite Catholic Archeparchy of Tyre, or the Melkite Greek Catholic Archeparchy of Tyre. The latter has apparently the largest property holdings of the Christian confessions in the area and is commonly just called "the Catholic church". In any event, it has been reported that a Lebanese Christian village developed in Rashidieh. In the following years, survivors of the Armenian genocide started arriving in Tyre, mostly by boat:

"The first agricultural settlement was created in Ra's al-'Ain, near the city of Tyre, in 1926. The operation quickly failed due to the animosity between refugees from different regions, but also between the refugees and the local population. The refugees had therefore to be relocated to Beirut."

Yet more refugees arrived and hence a branch of the Armenian General Benevolent Union was founded in Tyre in 1928. Then, in 1936, the colonial authorities started constructing a camp for Armenian refugees in Rashidieh. According to the above-mentioned oral history project, they were settled on the land which the French authorities had given to the Catholic church. The construction of the camp next to the Lebanese Christian village was planned on a street grid. The two village churches were incorporated into the camp. During the works a number of Phoenician tombs were discovered.

One year later, another camp was constructed in the El Bass area of Tyre.

In 1942, Emir Maurice Chehab (1904–1994) – "the father of modern Lebanese archaeology" who for decades headed the Antiquities Service in Lebanon and was the curator of the National Museum of Beirut – conducted further excavations in Rashidieh and discovered more cinerary urns from Phoenician times.

=== Lebanese independence (since 1943) ===
==== 1948 Palestinian exodus ====
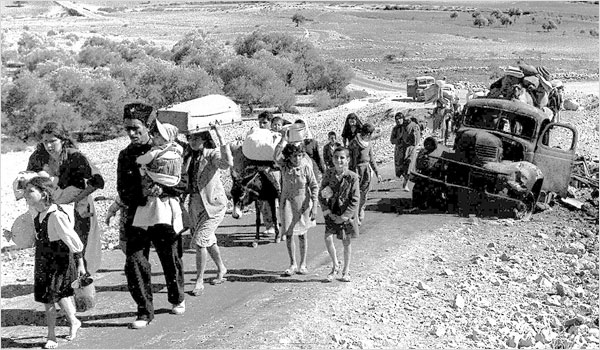
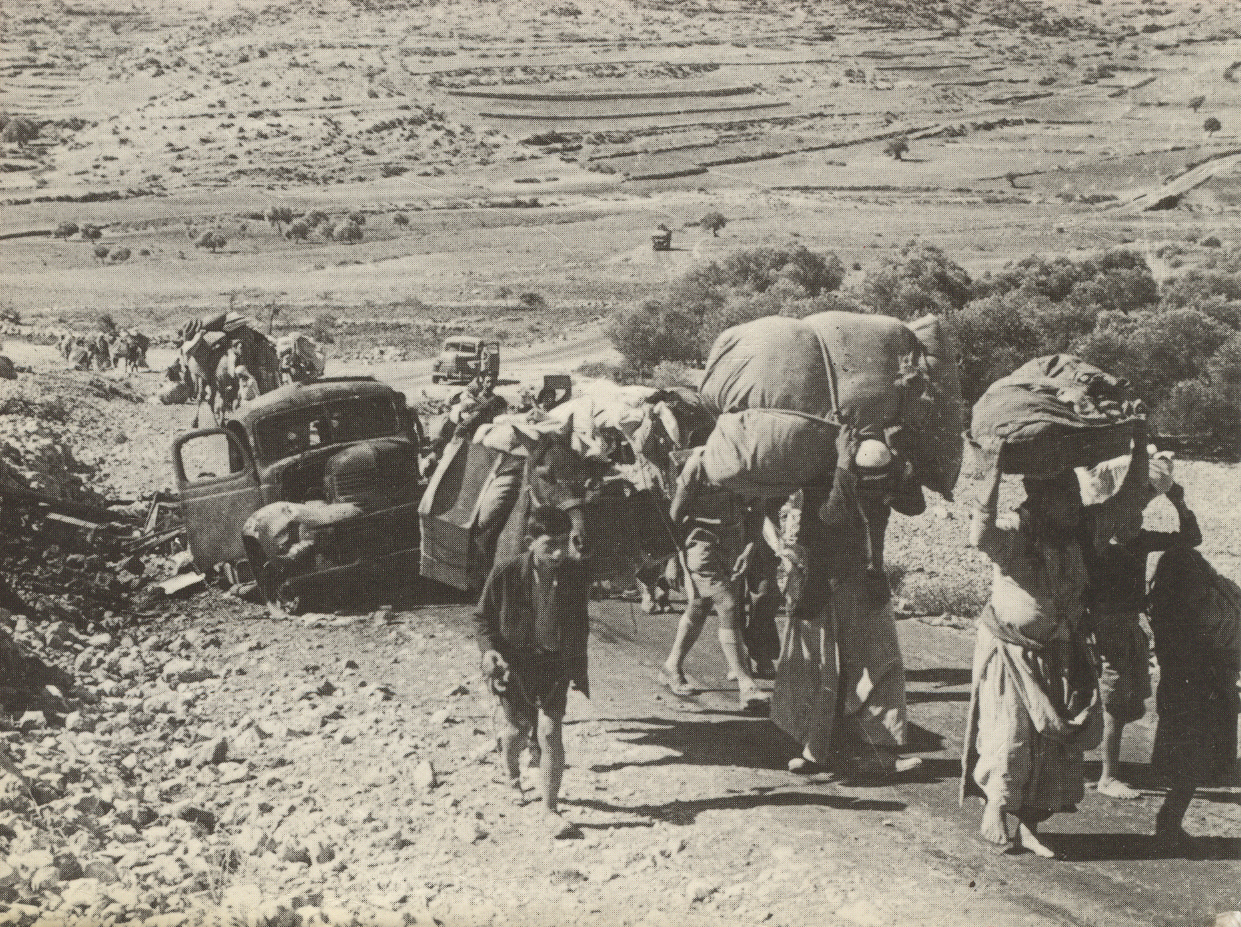
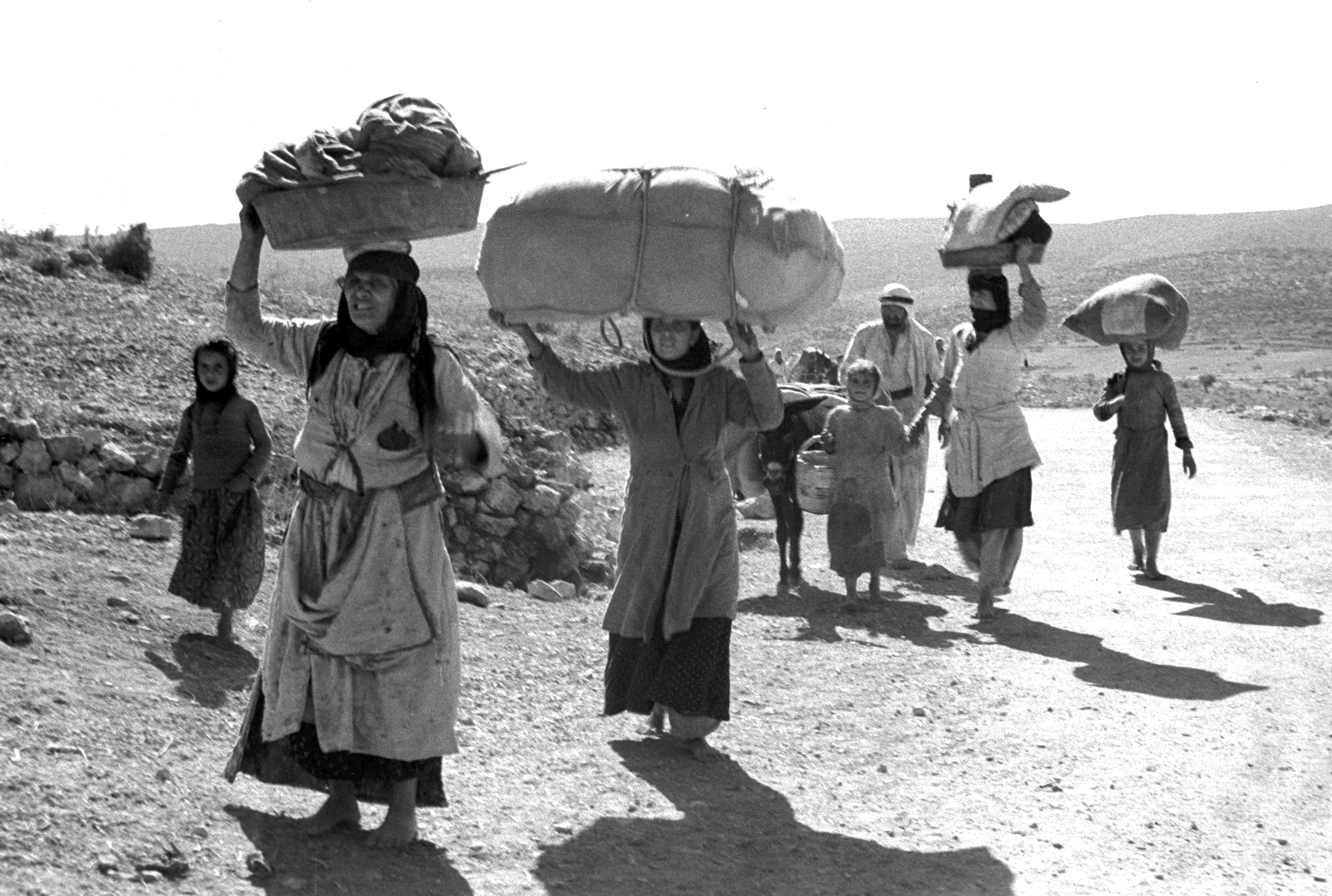
Palestinian refugees making their way from Galilee to Lebanon in October–November 1948

When the state of Israel was declared in May 1948, the area of Tyre was immediately affected: with the 1948 Palestinian expulsion and flight – also known as the Nakba – thousands of Palestinian refugees fled there, often by boat. However, Rashidieh apparently continued to house Armenian refugees, while Palestinians were sheltered in a tented camp at Burj el-Shemali for transit to other places in Lebanon.

"In 1950, a couple of years after arriving in south Lebanon, the Lebanese authorities decided to relocate all Palestinians residing in southern towns (e.g., Tibnine, al-Mansouri, al-Qlayla, and Bint Jbeil) to designated refugee camps. The authorities established one of these camps adjacent to the Armenian camp with nothing but tents. The residents there began to build walls from mud and clay in order to reinforce the tents. For every eight housing units, they built a shared bathroom fifty meters away. A decade later, as Armenian residents began to leave, the Palestinian refugees began moving into those lots. 200 of the 311 Armenian houses remain today and are commonly referred to as the >Old Camp.<"

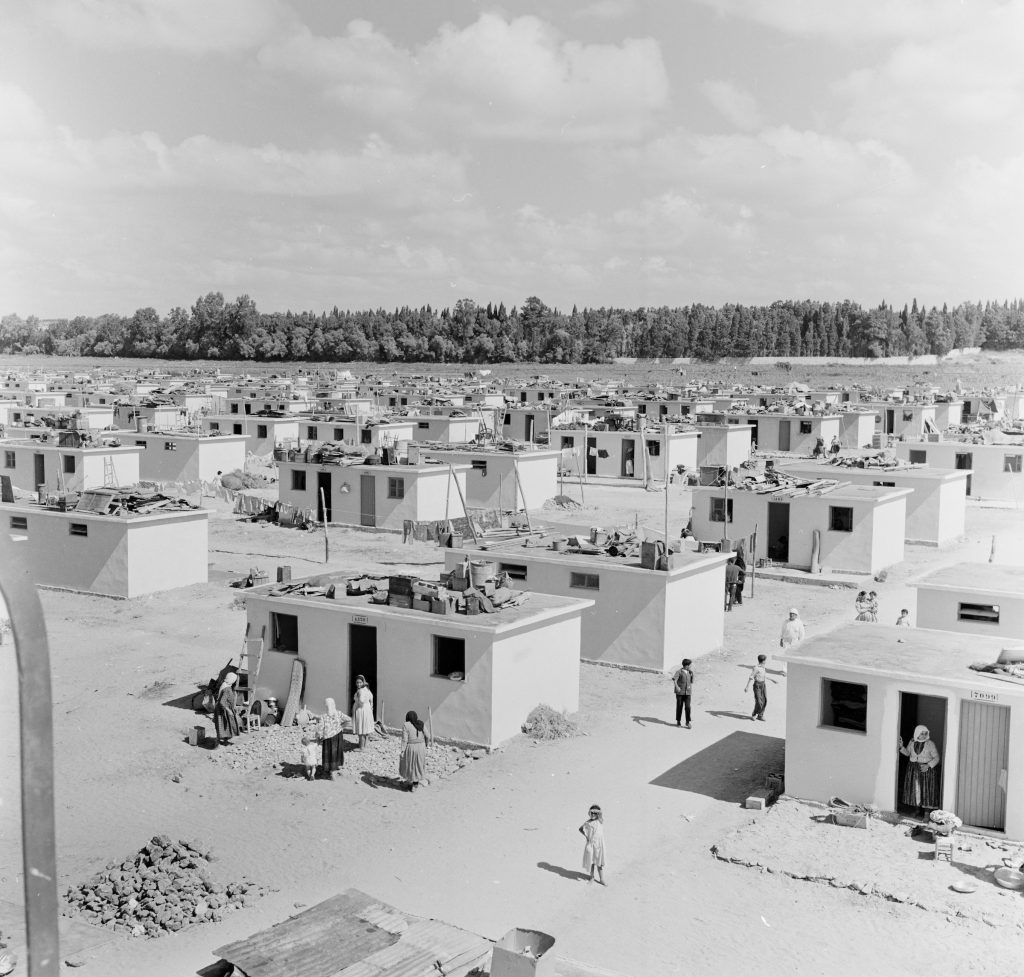
Rashidieh refugee camp in 1963

In 1963, the United Nations Relief and Works Agency for Palestine Refugees (UNRWA) built a new section in Rashidieh to accommodate Palestine refugees from Deir al-Qassi, Alma, Suhmata, Nahaf, Fara and other villages in Palestine, who were relocated by the Lebanese government from the El Bass refugee camp and from Baalbeck.

"After the 1969 agreement in which the Lebanese government recognized the presence of the Palestine Liberation Organization (PLO) in Lebanon, and its control of the camps, the Rashidieh residents worked the Jaftalak fields surrounding the camp without paying any fees. Each farmer could choose a plot of land to plant and they would come to be (informally) known as the owner of that plot. The Jaftalak land was public land divided between the Ministry of Finance, the Ministry of Education, and other-defined state land. Yet the cultivation of Jaftalak fields was limited to greens: pinto beans, lettuce, parsley, cilantro, radishes, etc. The farmers were prohibited from growing fruit-bearing trees since the land did not legally belong to them. According to Lebanese property law, whoever plants a tree, automatically owns the land it is on."

In 1970, the camp received more Palestinian refugees, this time from Hashemite Kingdom of Jordan following the Black September conflict between Jordanian Armed Forces (JAF) under King Hussein and the PLO led by Yasser Arafat. Rashidieh increasingly became an important recruitment and training center for Al-'Asifah, the armed wing of Arafat's Fatah faction.

In 1974, the Israeli military attacked: on May 19, the Israeli Navy reportedly shelled Rashidieh, killing 5 people and injuring 11. On 20 June, the Israeli Air Force (IAF) bombed the camp. According to the Lebanese army, 5 people were killed and 21 injured in Rashidieh.

In the same year, "a rescue excavation" was conducted in Rashidieh by Lebanon's Department of Antiquities after a mechanical digger was used to build a shelter and five Iron Age tombs were discovered.

==== Lebanese Civil War (1975–1990) ====
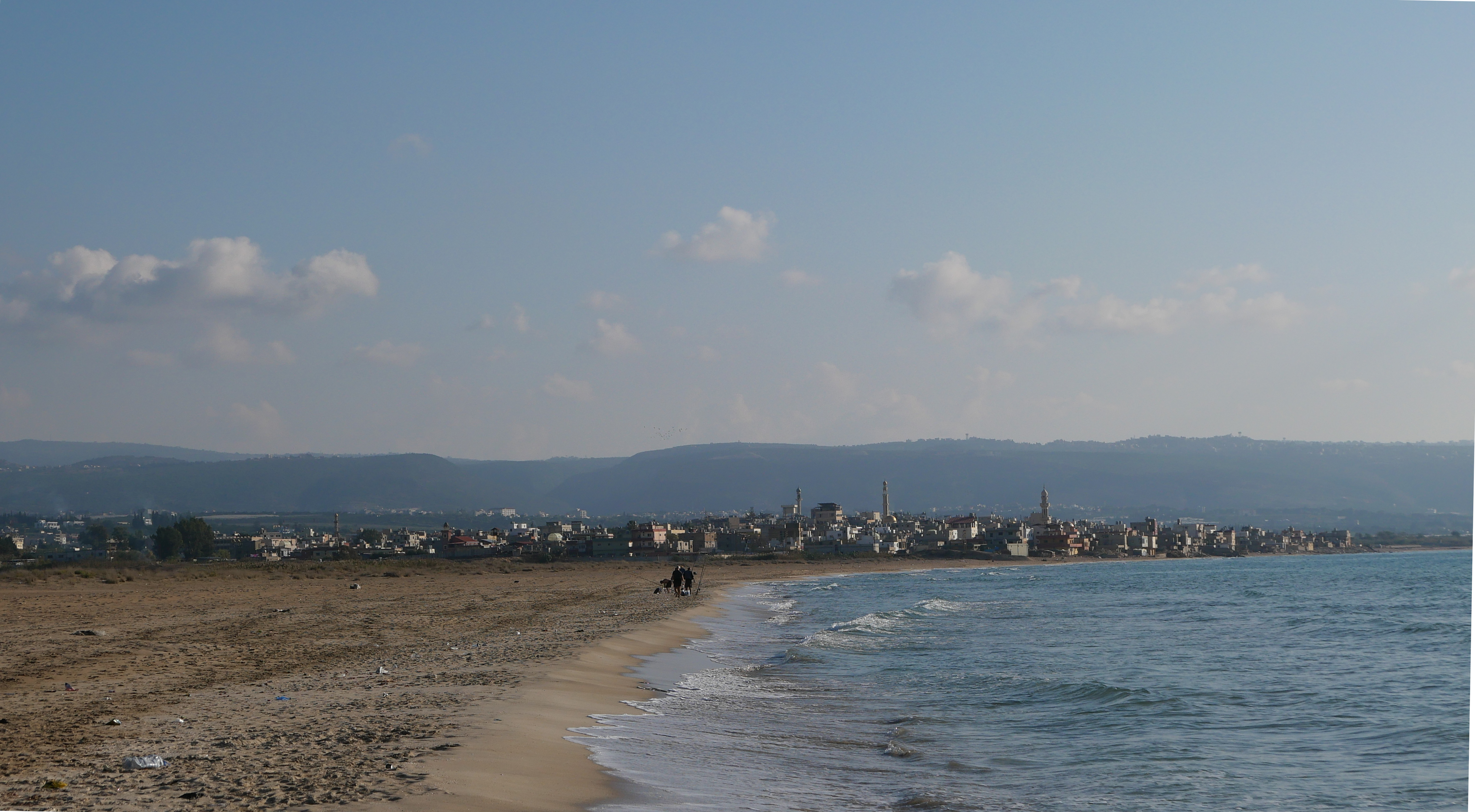
The Northern side of Rashidie, seen from the beach of the Tyre Coast Nature Reserve (2021)

In January 1975, a unit of the Popular Front for the Liberation of Palestine (PFLP) attacked the Tyre barracks of the Lebanese Army. The assault was denounced by the PLO as "a premeditated and reckless act".

Two months later, a PLO commando of eight militants sailed from the coast of Tyre to Tel Aviv to mount the Savoy Hotel attack, during which eight civilian Hostages and three Israeli soldiers were killed as well as seven of the attackers. Israel retaliated by launching a string of attacks on Tyre "from land, sea and air" in August and September 1975.

Then, in 1976, local commanders of the PLO took over the municipal government of Tyre with support from their allies of the Lebanese Arab Army. They occupied the army barracks, set up roadblocks and started collecting customs at the port. However, the new rulers quickly lost support from the Lebanese-Tyrian population because of their "arbitrary and often brutal behavior".

In 1977, three Lebanese fishermen in Tyre lost their lives in an Israeli attack. Palestinian militants retaliated with rocket fire on the Israeli town of Nahariya, leaving three civilians dead. Israel in turn retaliated by killing "over a hundred" mainly Lebanese Shiite civilians in the Southern Lebanese countryside. Some sources reported that these lethal events took place in July, whereas others dated them to November. According to the latter, the IDF also conducted heavy airstrikes as well as artillery and gunboat shelling on Tyre and surrounding villages, but especially on the Palestinian refugee camps in Rashidieh, Burj El Shimali and El Bass.

===== 1978 South Lebanon conflict with Israel =====
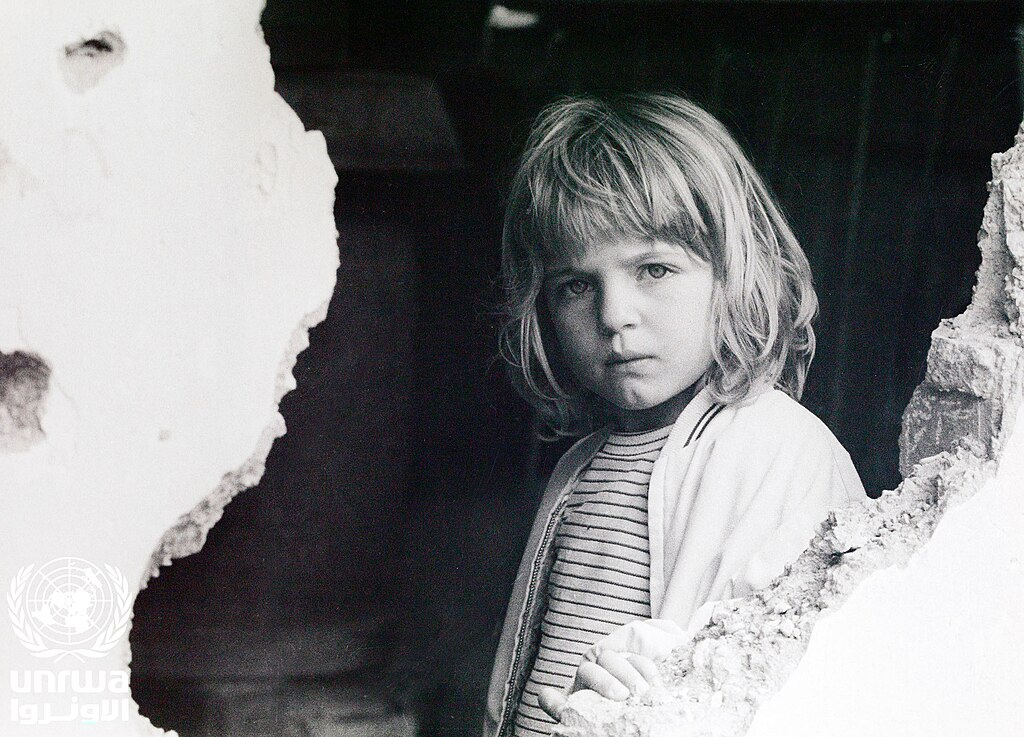
The child lives with her family at Rashidieh camp. Their shelter was directly hit by an Israeli attack, 1979

On 11 March 1978, Dalal Mughrabi – a young woman from the Palestinian refugee camp of Sabra in Beirut – and a dozen Palestinian fedayeen fighter sailed from Tyre to a beach north of Tel Aviv. Their attacks on civilian targets became known as the Coastal Road massacre that killed 38 Israeli civilians, including 13 children, and wounded 71. According to the United Nations,

PLO "claimed responsibility for that raid. In response, Israeli forces invaded Lebanon on the night of 14/15 March, and in a few days occupied the entire southern part of the country except for the city of Tyre and its surrounding area."

Tyre was badly affected in the fighting during the Operation Litani, with civilians bearing the brunt of the war, both in human lives and economically: The Israel Defense Forces (IDF) targeted especially the harbour on claims that the PLO received arms from there and the Palestinian refugee camps.

On 19 March, the UN Security Council adopted resolutions in which decided on the immediate establishment of the United Nations Interim Force in Lebanon (UNIFIL). Its first troops arrived in the area four days later. However, the Palestinian forces were unwilling to give up their positions in and around Tyre. UNIFIL was unable to expel those militants and sustained heavy casualties. It therefore accepted an enclave of Palestinian fighters in its area of operation which was dubbed the "Tyre Pocket". In effect, the PLO kept ruling Tyre with its Lebanese allies of the National Lebanese Movement, which was in disarray though after the 1977 assassination of its leader Kamal Jumblatt.

Frequent IDF bombardments of Tyre from ground, sea and air raids continued after 1978. The PLO, on the other side, reportedly converted itself into a regular army by purchasing large weapon systems, including Soviet WWII-era T-34 tanks, which it deployed in the "Tyre Pocket" with an estimated 1,500 fighters. From there, and the area around Rashidieh in particular, it kept firing Katyusha rockets across the Southern border into Galilee until a cease-fire in July 1981.

As discontent within the Shiite population about the suffering from the conflict between Israel and the Palestinian factions grew, so did the tensions between the Amal Movement – the dominant Shia-party – and the Palestinian militants. The power struggle was exacerbated by the fact that the PLO supported Saddam Hussein's camp during the Iraq-Iran-War, whereas Amal sided with Teheran. Eventually, the political polarisation between the former allies escalated into violent clashes in many villages of Southern Lebanon, including the Tyre area.

===== 1982 Lebanon War with Israel and occupation =====
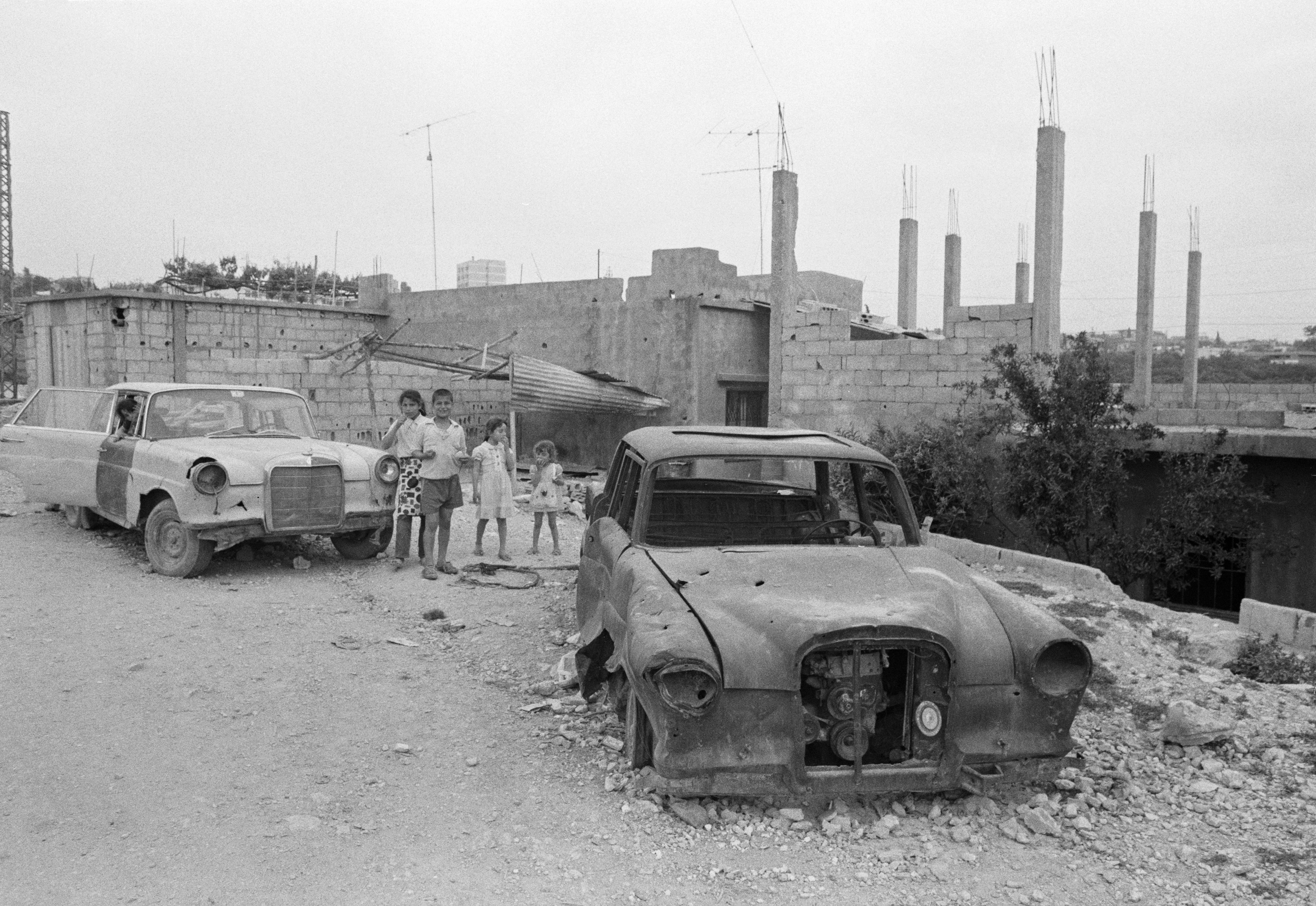
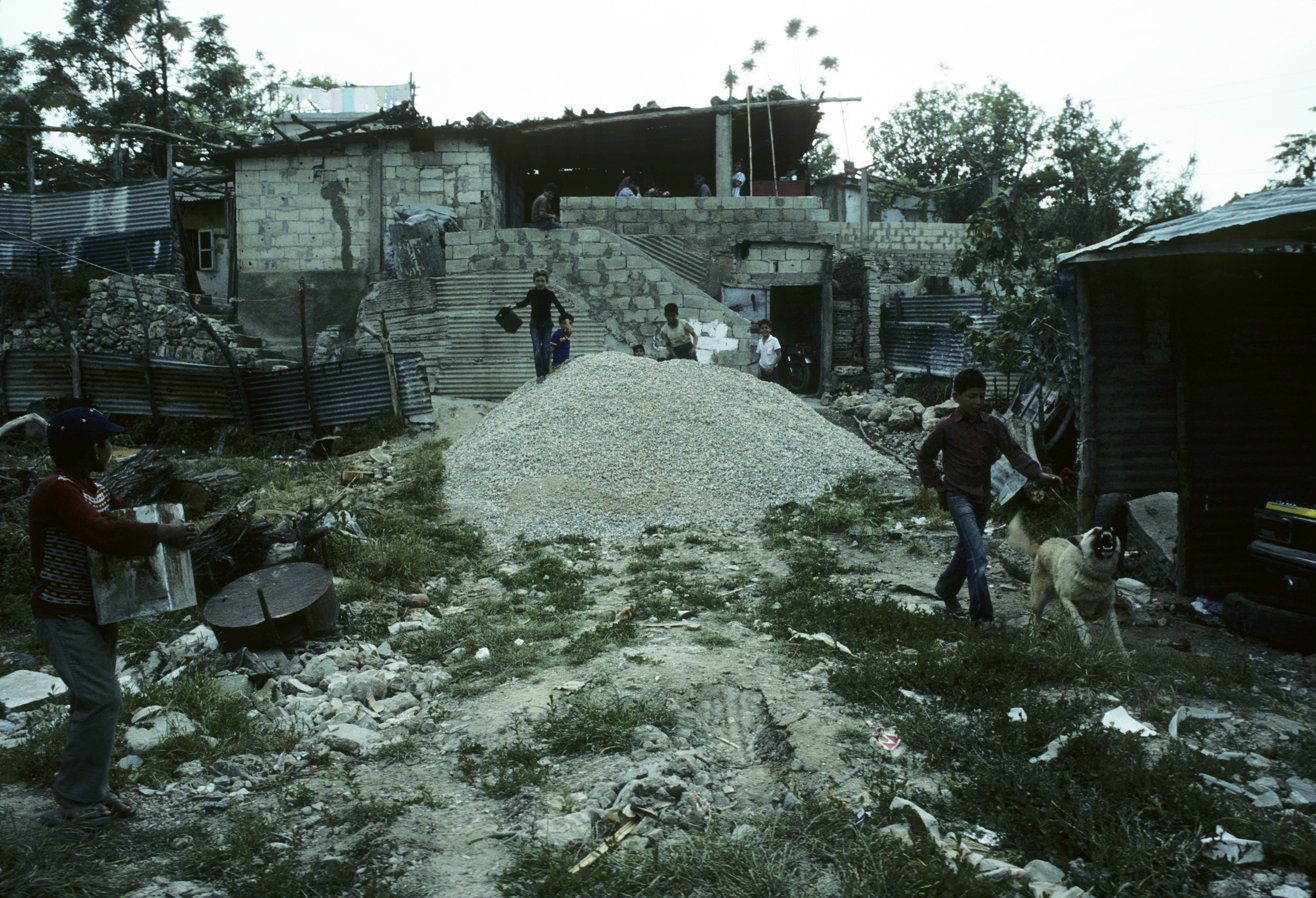
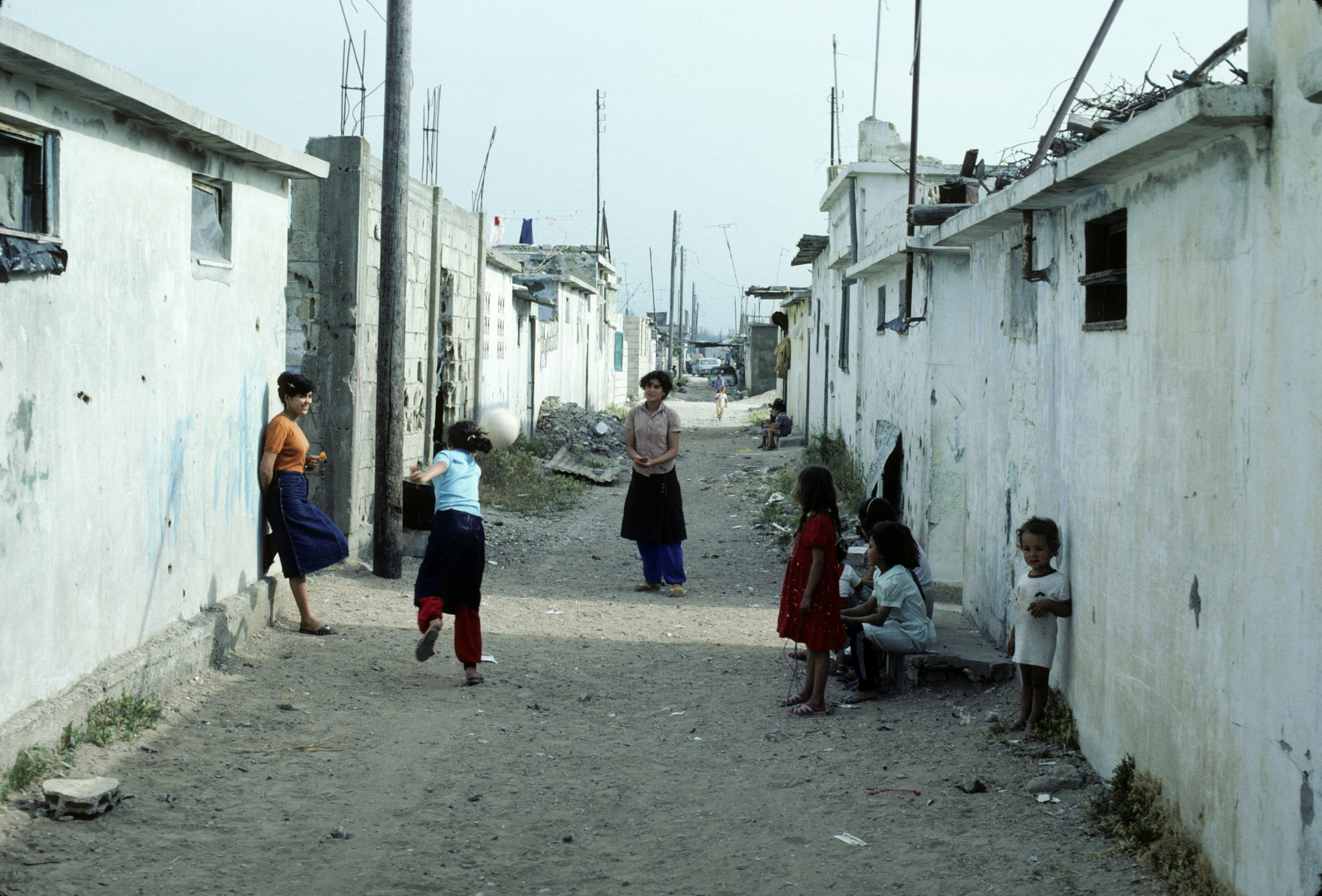
Daily life in Rashidieh in 1983 – photos taken by Jean Mohr (from the International Committee of the Red Cross archives)

Following an assassination attempt on Israeli ambassador Shlomo Argov in London the IDF invaded Lebanon on 6 June 1982, with heavy fighting in and around Tyre. The first target of the invaders was Rashidieh. There were 15,356 registered Palestinian refugees in the camp at the time, but John Bulloch, then the Beirut-based correspondent of The Daily Telegraph, estimated that it actually housed more than 30,000. Most civilians fled into underground tunnels and bomb shelters, while Palestinian fighters tried to hold off the Israeli army. The militants, however, came under massive fire from air strikes, gunboats and artillery. Bulloch reported that the IDF also dropped US-supplied cluster bombs and shells on Rashidieh.

Noam Chomsky recorded that already by the second day much of Rashidieh "had become a field of rubble." he quoted a UNIFIL officer as commenting: "It was like shooting sparrows with cannon." On the fourth day, many civilians reportedly left their shelters waving white flags. Those who remained suffered for three more days, until the last guerillas were defeated. Bulloch writes that the Israelis lost nine men. The volunteer nurse Françoise Kesteman, who was a member of the French Communist Party, recounted as exemplary the death of a young Palestinian mother:

"When Mouna left the bomb shelter to fetch food for the children, Israeli bombers ripped apart her small slender body."

For Kesteman, the bloodbath was a turning-point in her life and she joined the Palestinian guerillas after a brief return to France. She was killed two years later when she participated in an attempted attack on Israeli targets off the coast, making her the first French national to die fighting for the Palestinian militants.

When the fighting stopped after one week, more destruction was done "systematically", as the IDF brought in bulldozers. According to Bulloch, the occupation forces not only barred international correspondents from visiting the camp, but they also refused to allow the delegates of the International Committee of the Red Cross (ICRC) any access for five weeks. Subsequently, the Christian Science Monitor estimated that about sixty percent of the camp were destroyed with some 5,000 refugees living in the ruins:

"Israeli soldiers dynamited air raid shelters built by the Palestine Liberation Organization. The shelters were scattered throughout the camp and their demolition resulted in the destruction of surrounding houses as well. [..] Many other houses were bulldozed, according to camp residents and UNRWA workers, creating wide swaths leading to the sea."

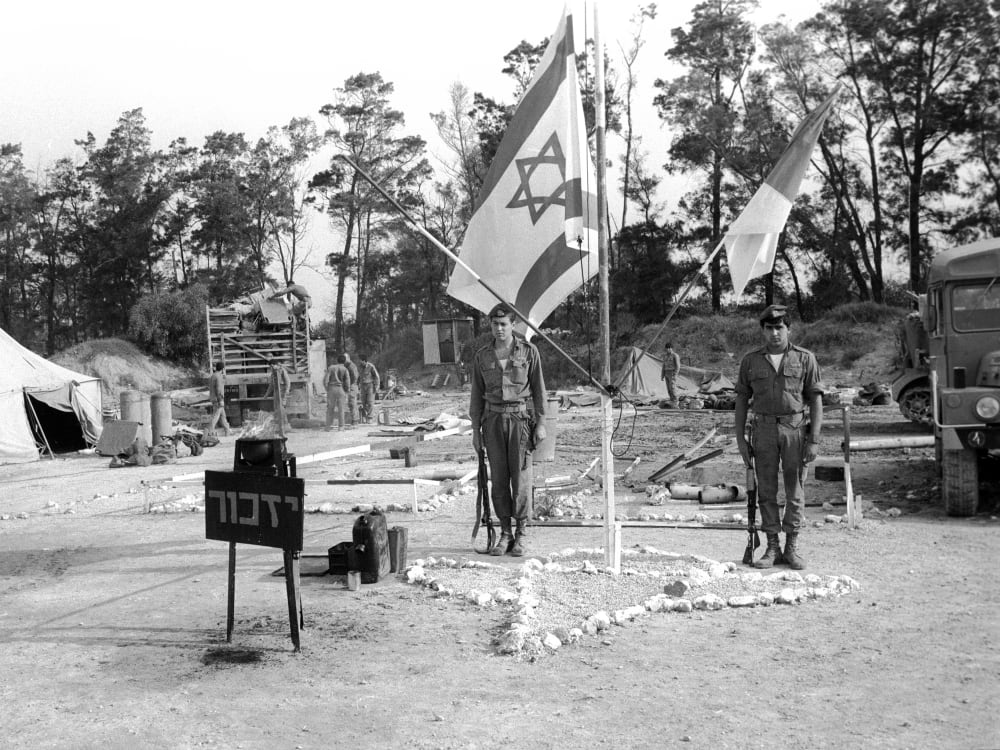
"During the evacuation of the western sector in the Tzur area"

The Israeli forces then made mass arrests, including women. The male detainees were paraded in front of hooded collaborators who advised the occupation forces whom to detain. Bulloch reported that

"busloads of handcuffed and blindfolded suspects were taken off for interrogation. These men were denied the small comfort of International Red Cross visits since they were not considered prisoners of war, but 'administrative detainees'."

Thus, the IDF obliterated Rashidieh as the main center of Palestinian operations into Upper Galilee. However, in the following three years, their occupation forces in the Tyre area came instead under the growing pressure from a number of devastating suicide attacks by Amal and – even more so – its emerging split-off Hezbollah. By the end of April 1985, the Israelis withdrew from Tyre and instead established a self-declared "Security Zone" in Southern Lebanon with its collaborating militia allies of the South Lebanon Army (SLA):

===== 1985–1988 War of the Camps: Amal vs. PLO =====
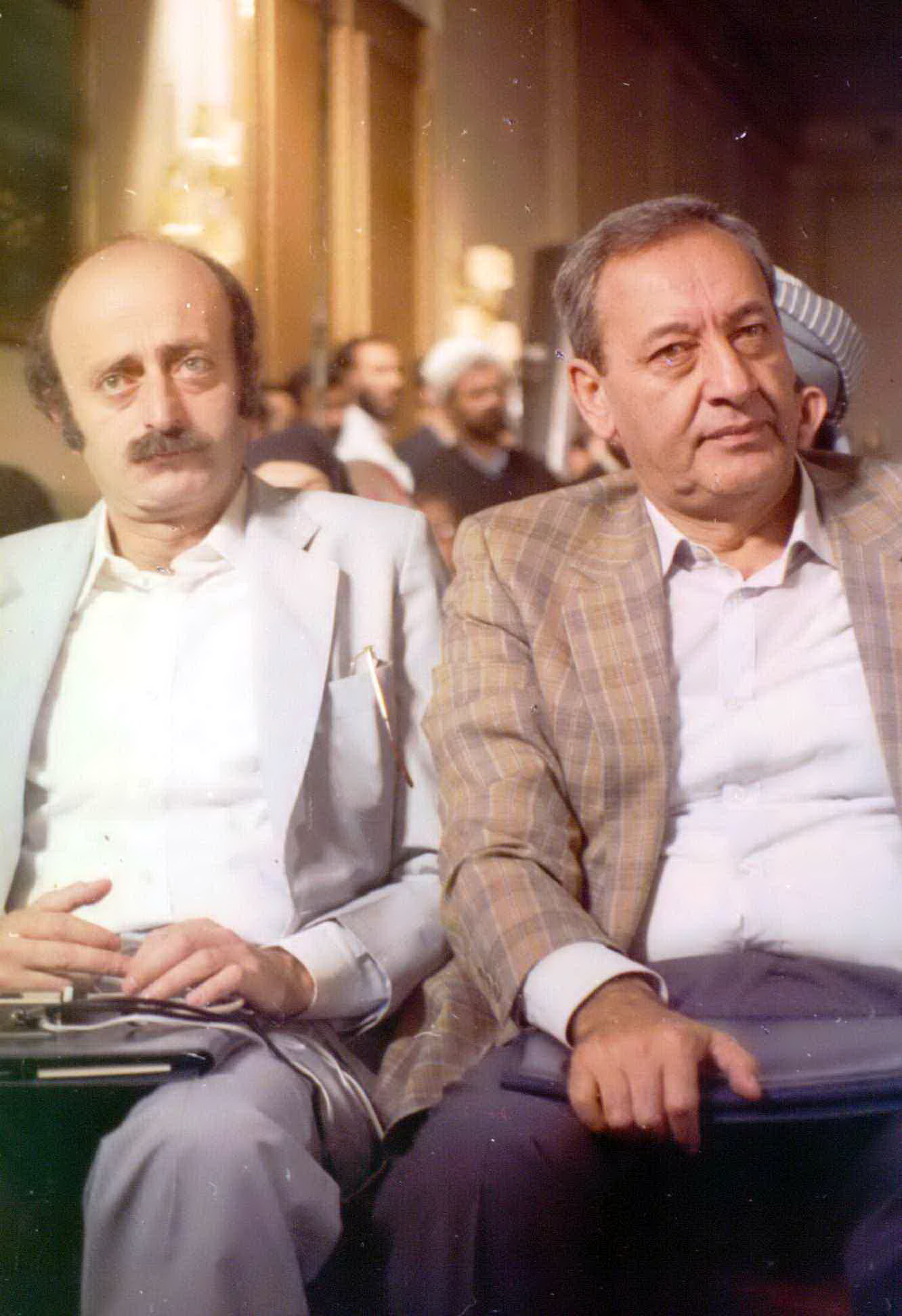
Berri (right) and Jumblatt in 1989

Tyre was 8 km beyond the security zone and taken over by Amal under the leadership of Nabih Berri.

"The priority of Amal remained to prevent the return of any armed Palestinian presence to the South, primarily because this might provoke renewed Israeli intervention in recently evacuated areas. The approximately 60,000 Palestinian refugees in the camps around Tyre (al-Bass, Rashidiya, Burj al-Shimali) were cut off from the outside world, although Amal never succeeded in fully controlling the camps themselves. In the Sunni 'canton' of Sidon, the armed PLO returned in force."

Tensions between Amal and Palestinian militants soon exploded into the War of the Camps, which is considered as "one of the most brutal episodes in a brutal civil war": In September 1986, a group of Palestinians fired on an Amal patrol at Rashidieh. At the end of September Amal imposed a blockade on the camp. After one month of siege, Amal attacked the camp. It was reportedly assisted by the Progressive Socialist Party of Druze leader Walid Jumblatt as well as by the pro-Syrian Palestinian militias of As-Saiqa and the "Popular Front for the Liberation of Palestine – General Command". Fighting spread and continued for one month. In the words of one Palestinian woman from Rashidieh,

"Amal [..] did the same things that the Israelis did."

UNRWA recorded that between 1982 and 1987 in Rashidieh

"more than 600 shelters were totally or partially destroyed and more than 5,000 Palestine refugees were displaced."

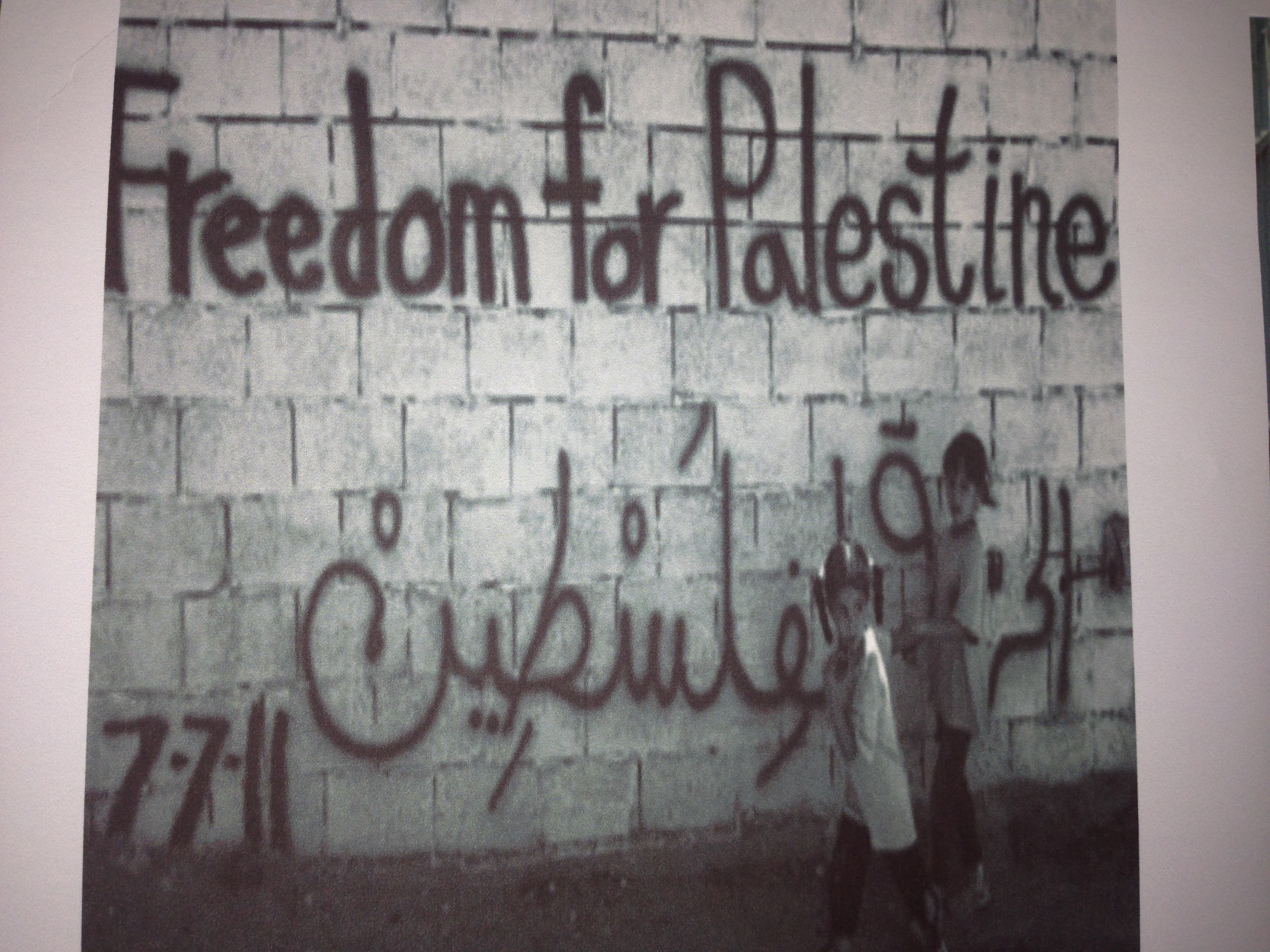
Graffiti in Rashidieh

By the end of November, with the fighting having spread to Sidon and Beirut, four small camps in Tyre had been destroyed with an estimated 18,000 residents fleeing to the Beqaa. On 24 November the Palestinian factions in Sidon launched an offensive against Amal positions in the strategic village of Maghdouché in an attempt to cut Amal forces around Rashidieh off from their stronghold in West Beirut. Rashidieh was able to withstand the siege better than the camps in Beirut since food was reaching the camp by sea. By the end of the year 8,000 Palestinians had fled to Sidon which was not under Amal control. Around a 1,000 men had been kidnapped from the camps in Tyre.

The conflict ended with the withdrawal of Palestinian forces loyal to PLO leader Arafat from Beirut and their redeployment to the camps in Southern Lebanon. The one in Rashidieh likewise continued to be the "main stronghold" of Arafat's Fatah party and loyalist contingents of other PLO factions, though some forces opposed to them – including Islamists – kept a presence and representation there as well.

In February 1988, "Amal seemed to lose control" when US-Colonel William R. Higgins, who served in a senior position of the United Nations Truce Supervision Organization (UNTSO), was kidnapped on the coastal highway to Naqoura close to Rashidieh by armed men suspected of being affiliated with Hezbollah. The incident took place following a meeting between Higgins and a local Amal leader and led to renewed clashes between Amal and Hezbollah, mainly in Beirut.

Throughout the war, clandestine excavations were conducted in Rashidieh. Many cinerary urns from Phoenician times thus ended up in private collections without any documentation. In addition, Rashidieh's beach was subject to sand grabbing and suction.

==== Post-Civil War (since 1990) ====
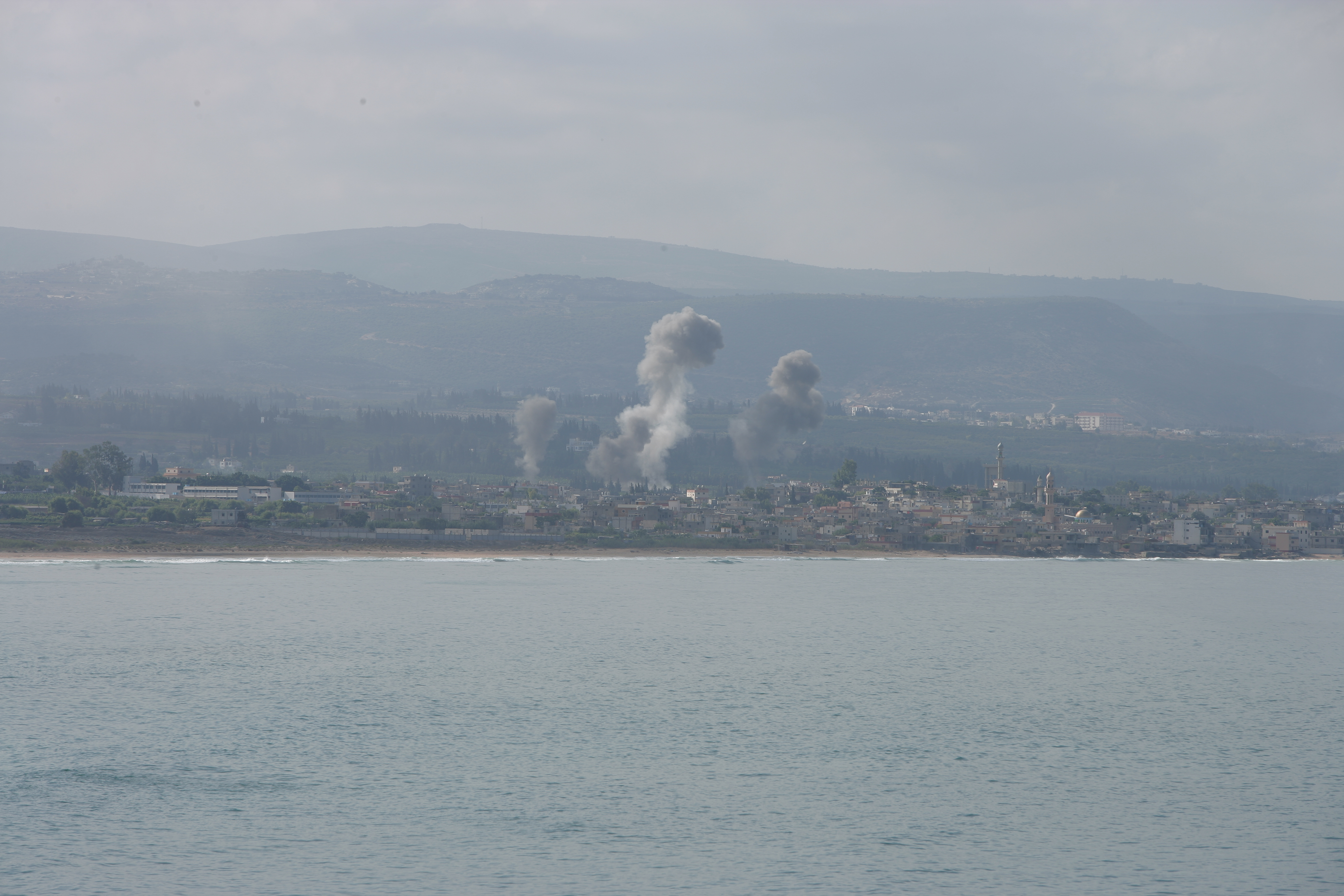
Smoke rises from IAF attacks on he Rashidieh area during the 2006 Lebanon war (from the collections of the ICRC Audiovisual Archives)

On 14 June 1990 fierce fighting broke out in the Rashidieh Camp between two factions of the Abu Nidal Organization. The clashes lasted two days with three killed and 15 wounded. Amongst the dead was the leader of the Abu Nidal loyalists in the Camp. His followers evacuated to Ain al-Hilwa Camp.

An Israeli air strike on Rashidieh, 24 October 1990, caused 5 casualties and destroyed a school.

Following the end of the war in March 1991 based on the Taif Agreement, units of the Lebanese Army deployed along the coastal highway and around the Palestinian refugee camps of Tyre.

By the end of the 1990s, the Coalition of Fatah with the Palestinian Liberation Front (PLF), Palestinian Popular Struggle Front (PPSF), and the Palestinian People's Party (PPP) in Lebanon was headed by Sultan Abu al-'Aynayn, who resided in Rashidieh. In 1999, he was sentenced to death in absentia by the Lebanese authorities for inciting armed rebellion and damaging the property of the Lebanese state.

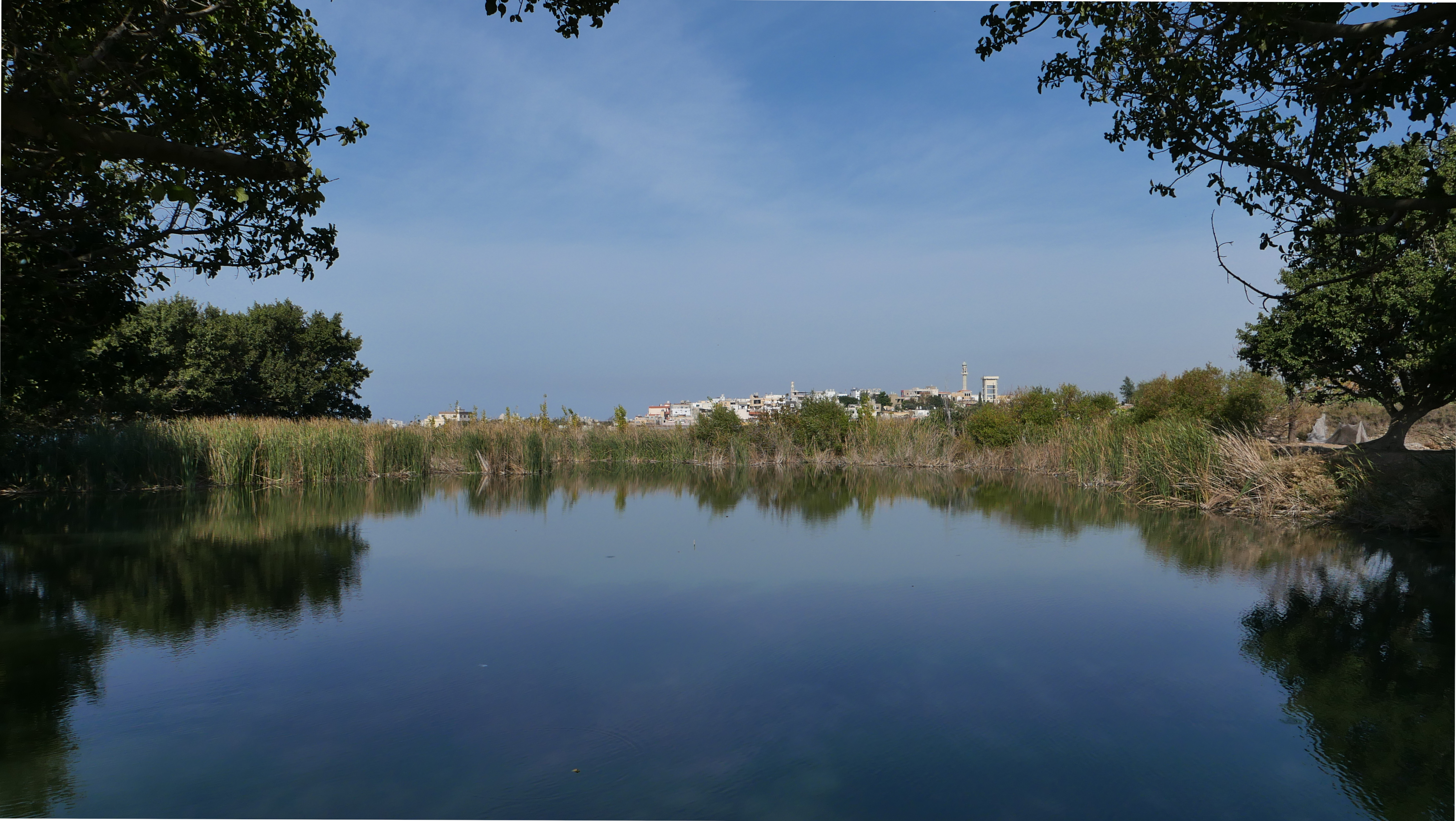
Southern side of Rashidieh, seen from the Ras Al Ain area (2021).

At the time of Israel's invasion in the July 2006 Lebanon War, the camp had about 18,000 residents. Reportedly, more than 1,000 Lebanese fled their homes to seek shelter in Rashidieh during the Israeli bombardments of Southern Lebanon:

"It's kind of an irony really. It's almost a joke what's going on," said Ibrahim al-Ali, a 26-year-old Palestinian social worker in the camp. "The irony is that refugees are accepting citizens from their own country."

However, on 8 August 2006, the area of Rashidieh was hit by Israeli attack as well.

In May 2020, clashes in Rashidieh left one person dead and five others injured.

On 14 May 2021, shortly after the beginning of the 2021 Israel–Palestine crisis, the Lebanese Army issued a statement saying that they had found three rockets in the Rashidieh area, but that the discovery was not linked to the launch of a number of rockets – apparently Soviet-era short-range Grad projectiles – from the nearby coastal area belonging to the Al-Qlailah village a day earlier.

== Demographics ==
In 2014 Christians made up 99.79% of registered voters in Ar-Rashidiyah. 99.37% of the voters were Armenians.

=== Refugees ===
A 2017 census found that there were 1,510 buildings with 2,417 households in Ar-Rashidiyah.

== Economy ==
Almost half of those residents of Rashidieh who are in work do low-paid seasonal or occasional jobs on construction sites or as agricultural labourers in the banana, lime and orange orchards of the region.

== Cultural life ==
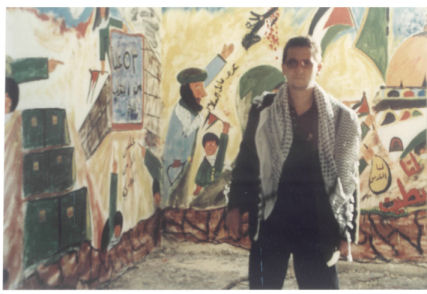
Murals in Rashidieh (2001)

Unlike most other Palestinian refugee camps in Lebanon, which also house some non-Palestinian residents and Palestinian Christian families, Rashidieh is assumed to be populated entirely by Muslim Palestinians. The two old village churches, which were both partially destroyed during the civil war, are now used for storage.

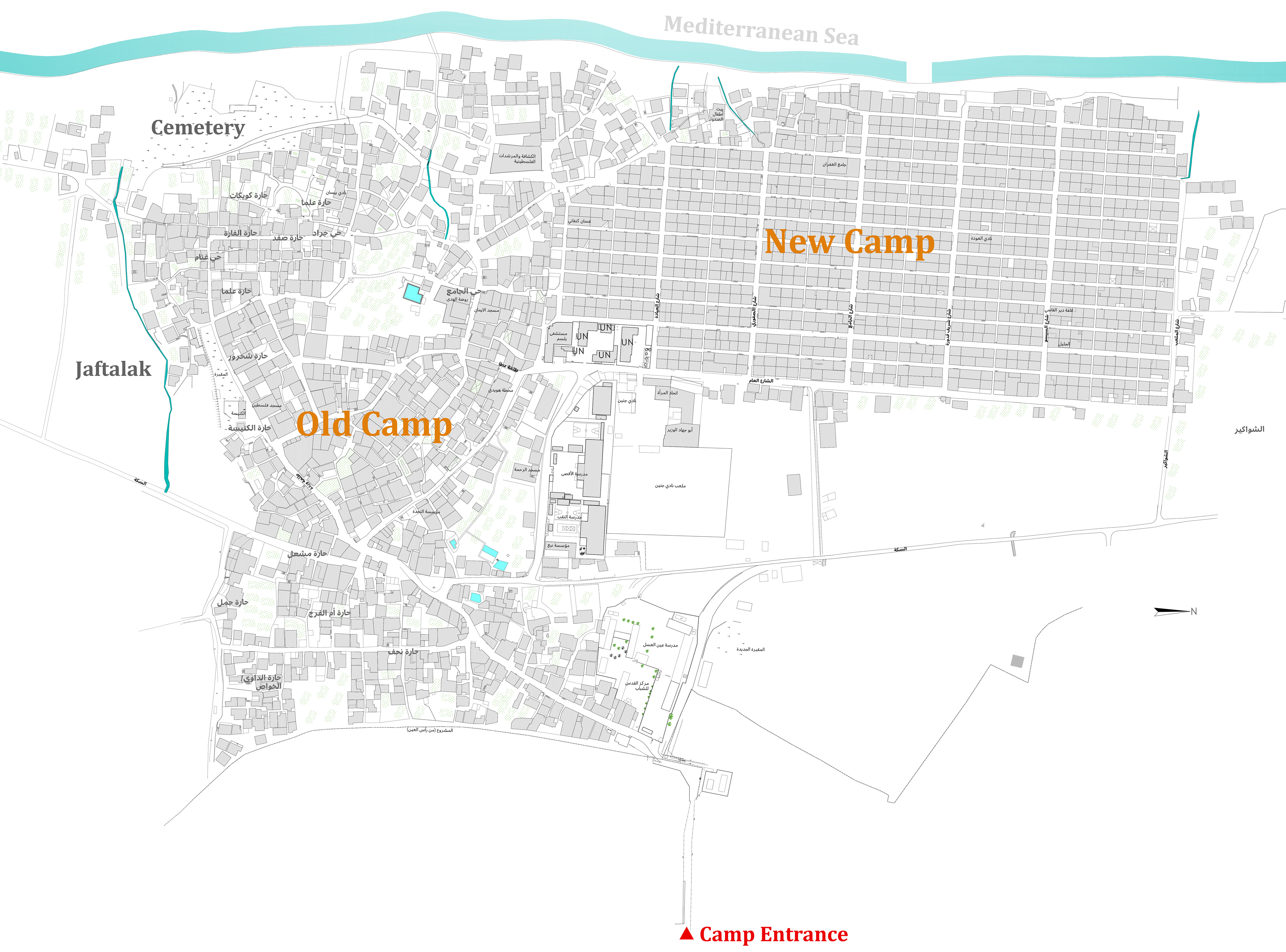
2017 map by the Dictaphone Group showing the original Old Camp for the Armenians in the South (left)

Like in other camps, Rashidieh's visual landscape reflects Palestinian nationalism, as murals, posters and flags express the hope to return homes. In this way they produce and reproduce Palestinian national identity. There have been several other art projects that focused on individual narratives rather than on general symbols. In 2014, for instance, "Humans of Al Rashidiya" portrayed ordinary residents online, inspired by the photoblog "Humans of New York", with the aim of countering clichés:

"Many people think that our camps are security time bombs, while others haven’t even heard of us [..]. Stereotypes dating back to the Civil War haven’t really faded away, [..] despite the fact that most of us have always opposed all forms of violence."

Two years later, the Lebanese artist collective Dictaphone Group created the project Camp Pause, commissioned by the Beirut-based Dar El-Nimer foundation of Lebanese-Palestinian art collector Rami el-Nimer. It was exhibited at the Qalandia International Festival 2016 and at the 2017 CounterCurrent Festival in Houston, Texas. A video installation, which was contextualised by multidisciplinary research, centered on portraits of four Rashidieh residents around their everyday routes:

"Along the way, they weave narratives about the history of the land, their arrival, the struggle to build, and everyday life in a camp situated away from the city, bordered by agricultural fields and the sea. [..] We are reminded through this project that the disregard of people’s pain and personal choices, the casual racism and vilification of refugees in Lebanese villages and towns, and the calls for grouping refugees in camps that are easily controlled and ultimately attacked is nothing new. While the whole world is busy discussing what they call the “refugee crisis,” we hope to remember the importance of listening to those who are really in that crisis. We also hope to remember that leaving people in limbo with few resources and rights is not a solution but an absence of one."

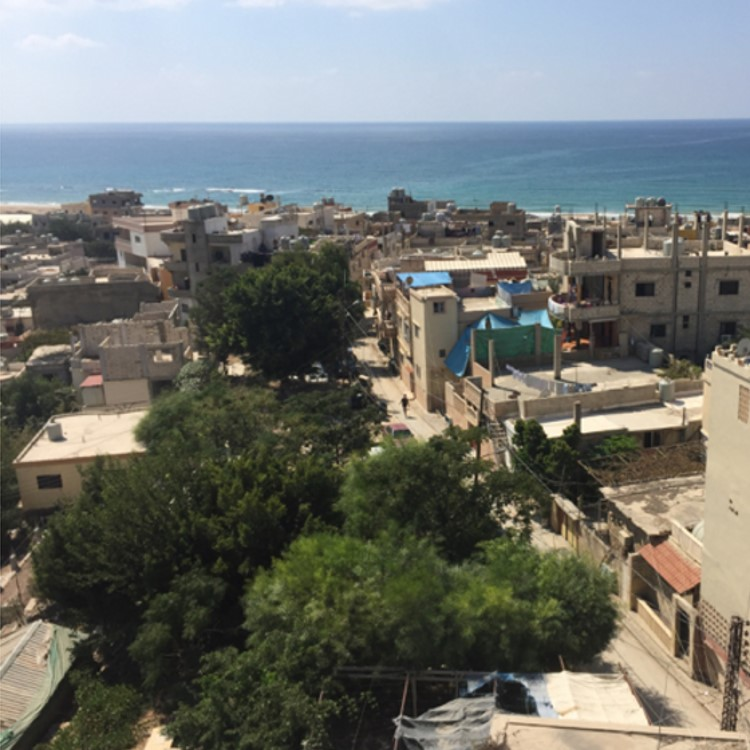
View of the camp in 2016

Meanwhile, the French anthropologist Sylvain Perdigon – who lived in the Al Bass camp in 2006/2007 and has been a lecturer at the American University of Beirut (AUB) since 2013 – has researched another kind of a cultural phenomenon that he describes as "fairly ordinary" amongst many Palestinians in Lebanon: It haunts people in their dreams through different forms, interrupts their lives and is especially feared for causing miscarriages. Perdigon lays out one exemplary case of this phenomenon – which is known as Al Qreene – from Rashidieh:

"I heard Abu Ali tell of a still fresh encounter with al-Qreene during a visit in 2014 to relatives in a Beirut flat. He comes from the secluded camp of Rashidiyye where he lives and works as a foot soldier in the remnants of the PLO armed forces inside the camp. The telling occurred at this point when relatives are done with the business of sharing essential family news, and the conversation starts to wander more lazily. A few months before, in his mid-forties, Abu Ali had started to have dreams of being stuck by himself in his own, emptied camp house with a cat walking in circles and mewing plaintively. There was something unsettling to this cat, yet no matter how hard Abu Ali tried, there also was no getting him out of the house. The dream returned for weeks on end and what was only irksome, even a bit funny, at first gradually turned into a liability as Abu Ali found himself perpetually tired, unfocused, and less and less capable of holding his guard duty properly. An old neighbor, upon hearing of Abu Ali’s dream from his wife, recognized al-Qreene and advised him to heap small mounds of salt in every corner of his house. Abu Ali followed her advice, the nagging cat disappeared from his dreams, and his focus returned."

== Gallery: Photos from "Camp Pause" by the Dictaphone Group ==
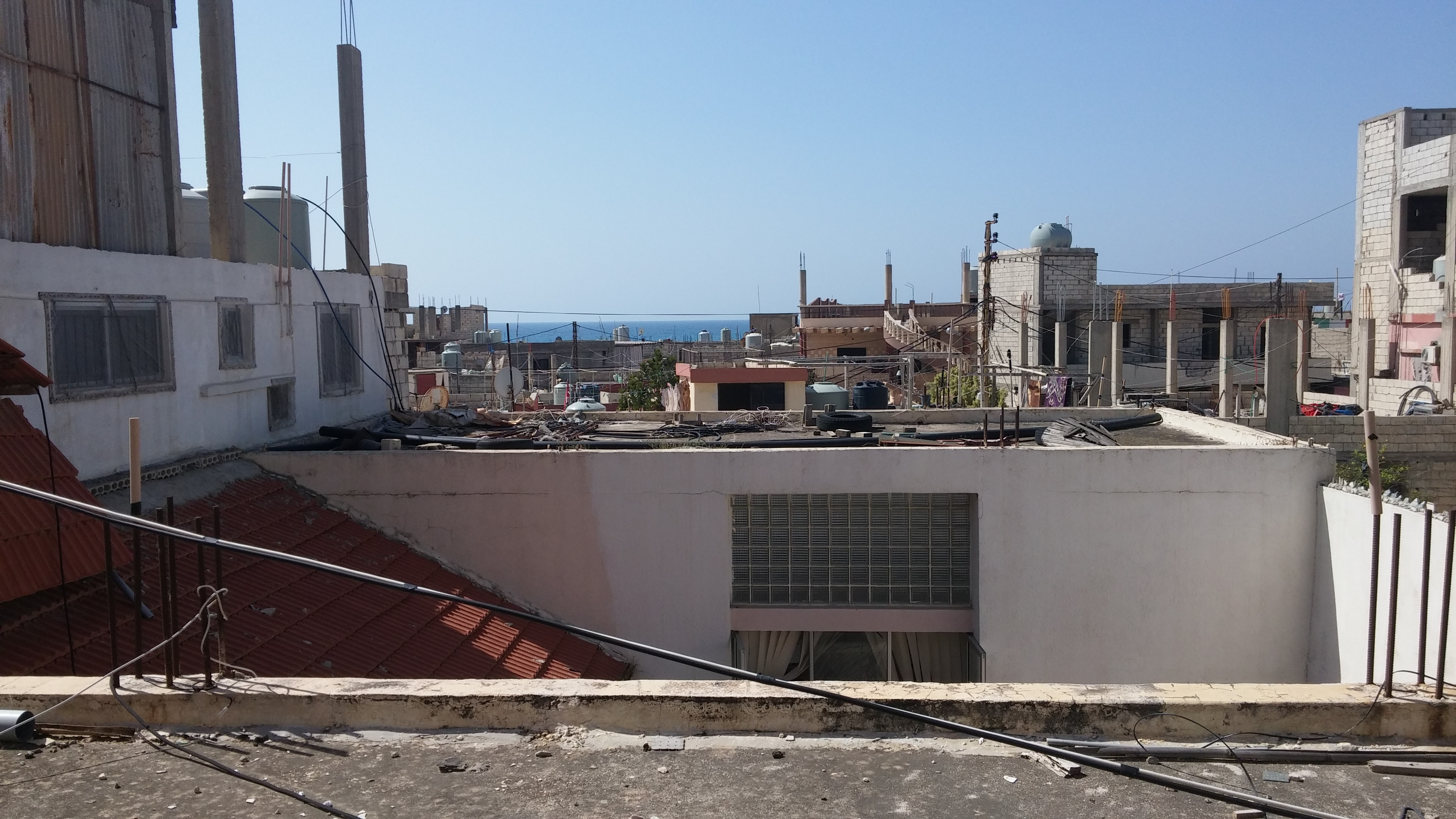

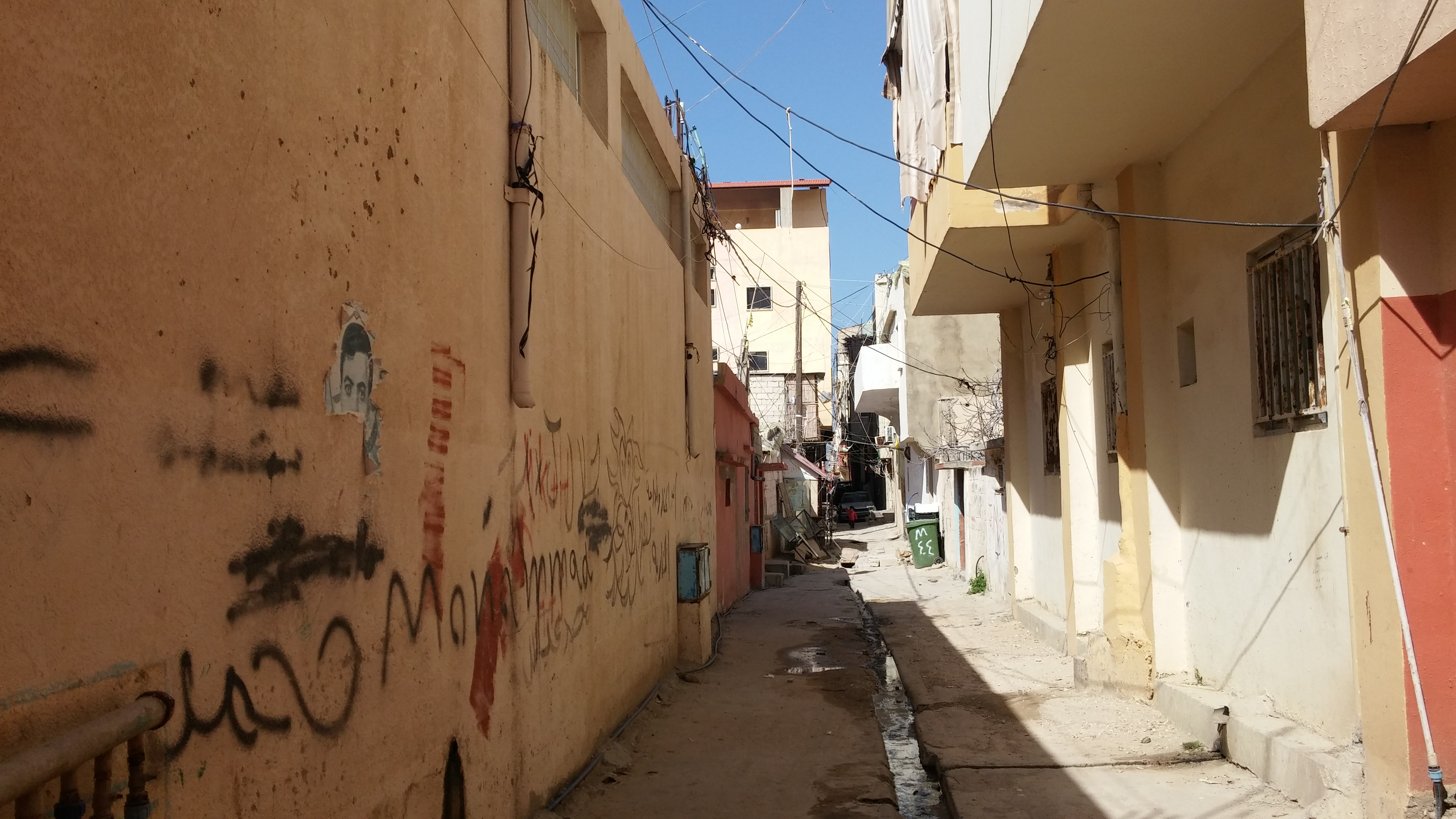

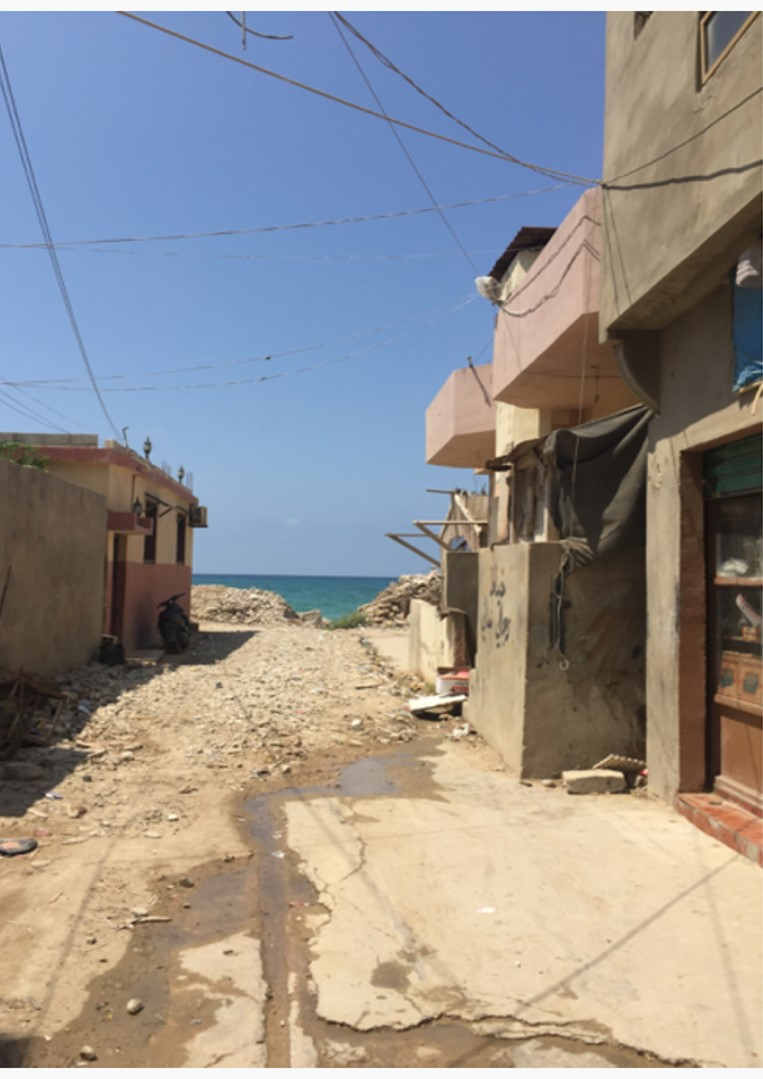

== Notable people ==
- Samir El-Youssef (born 1965), writer and critic.

== See also ==
- Armenians in Lebanon
- Palestinians in Lebanon
