= Legion of the Damned =

Legion of the Damned may refer to:

- Legion of the Damned (band), a Dutch thrash/death metal band
- Legion of the Damned (film), a 1969 Italian, Spanish, and West German film
- Legion of the Damned (novel), a 1993 novel by William C. Dietz
- The Legion of the Damned (novel), a 1953 novel by Sven Hassel
- Legion of the Damned (Warhammer 40,000), a chapter of Space Marines in the Warhammer 40,000 universe
