= John Bullock =

John Bullock may refer to:

== Politicians ==
- John Bullock (1731–1809), MP for Maldon, Steyning and Essex
- John Dwight Bullock (1836–1914), member of the Wisconsin State Assembly
- John Bullock (MP for Tamworth), see Tamworth (UK Parliament constituency)
- John Bullock (died 1740), MP for Maldon (UK Parliament constituency)

== Others ==
- John Bullock (American football) (born 2001), American football player
- John Bullock (bishop), bishop of Ross, 1418
- John Bullock (rugby league) (died 2009), English rugby league player
- John Bullock (racing driver) in 1984 British Formula Three season
- Johnny Bullock, jockey, Festival Trophy Handicap Chase
- Jack Bullock, 1959 Grand Prix motorcycle racing season

== See also ==
- John Bulloch (disambiguation)
