= Samir El-Youssef =

Palestinian-British writer and critic (born 1965)

- سمير اليوسف
- Born: 1965 (age 60–61); Rashidieh, Lebanon
- Education: Birkbeck, University of London

Samir El-Youssef (Arabic: سمير اليوسف; born 1965) is a Palestinian-British writer and critic.

He was born in Rashidieh, a Palestinian refugee camp in southern Lebanon, where he lived until he was ten, before moving to Sidon, Lebanon. El-Youssef's father is a Sunni and his mother is from the only Shia Palestinian family. He emigrated to Cyprus in 1989, and since 1990 has been living in London, where he studied philosophy and gained a Master of Arts degree from Birkbeck, University of London. In 2000, he was granted British citizenship.

He writes in both Arabic and English, and some of his work has been translated into German, Italian, Greek and Norwegian. In 2004, he co-authored a book with Israeli author Etgar Keret, called Gaza Blues: Different Stories.

His 2007 book The Illusion of Return is his first novel written in English. He is also an essayist with a wide range of interests including literature, politics, philosophy and cultural studies. His essays and reviews have appeared in Arabic periodicals and newspapers such as the London-based Al-Hayat, as well as on openDemocracy.net, The Guardian's Comment is Free and in the New Statesman.

In 2005, the Swedish branch of the organisation International PEN granted El-Youssef the Tucholsky award, named after Kurt Tucholsky and given each year to a writer or publisher who is either being persecuted or threatened, or living in exile.

== Bibliography ==
- Samir El-Youssef and Etgar Keret: (2004) Gaza Blues: Different Stories, London: David Paul, ISBN 978-0-9540542-4-3
- Samir El-Youssef (2007) The Illusion of Return, London: Halban, ISBN 978-1-905559-07-7
- Samir El-Youssef (2008) A Treaty of Love, London: Halban, ISBN 978-1-905559-09-1
