= Al-Qlailah =

Al-Qlailah القليلة
- Municipality
- Location within Lebanon
- Coordinates: 33°11′47″N 35°13′52″E
- Grid position: 171/289 PAL
- Country: Lebanon
- Governorate: South Governorate
- District: Tyre
- Elevation: 98 ft (30 m)
- Time zone: GMT +3

Al-Qlailah (Arabic: القليلة, romanized: al-Qlaylah) is a municipality in the Tyre District in South Lebanon.

== Etymology ==
According to E. H. Palmer in 1881, the name Leileh comes from a female proper name; it also means “night”.

== History ==
In 1875, Victor Guérin describes a ruin to the east of the village, which he calls Kh. Kleileh. "The upright of oil-presses, a winepress cut in the rock, with two compartments, one round and one square, and three broken sarcophagi, are all that remain here. A short distance south of this place he found another ruined hamlet, having a cistern cut in the rock, and an enormous millstone lying on the ground, called Kh. Ratieh".

In 1881, the PEF's Survey of Western Palestine (SWP) described it: "A small well-built stone village, containing about 50 Moslems, surrounded by olives and arable ground. The water supply is from 'Ain Zaheiriyeh."

On 13 May 2021, shortly after the beginning of the 2021 Israel–Palestine crisis, a number of rockets – apparently Soviet-era short-range Grad projectiles – were fired from the coastal area of Al-Qlailah, just south of the Palestinian refugee camp of Rashidieh towards northern Israel. According to some reports, three rockets were involved which all fell into the Mediterranean Sea, causing no damage. According to other sources, altogether five missiles were launched and two of them crashed onto Lebanese grounds, while three got lost off the coast.

== Demographics ==
In 2014 Muslims made up 99.38% of registered voters in Al-Qlailah. 98.06% of the voters were Shiite Muslims.

== Bibliography ==
- Conder, C.R.; Kitchener, H.H. (1881). The Survey of Western Palestine: Memoirs of the Topography, Orography, Hydrography, and Archaeology. Vol. 1. London: Committee of the Palestine Exploration Fund.
- Guérin, V. (1880). Description Géographique Historique et Archéologique de la Palestine (in French). Vol. 3: Galilee, pt. 2. Paris: L'Imprimerie Nationale.
- Palmer, E.H. (1881). The Survey of Western Palestine: Arabic and English Name Lists Collected During the Survey by Lieutenants Conder and Kitchener, R. E. Transliterated and Explained by E.H. Palmer. Committee of the Palestine Exploration Fund.
