= The Final Battle (novel) =

1995 novel by William C. Dietz

- Author: William C. Dietz
- Language: English
- Genre: Military science fiction
- Publisher: Ace Books
- Publication date: July 1, 1995
- Publication place: United States
- Media type: Print (Paperback)
- Pages: 400 pp (paperback edition)
- Preceded by: Legion of the Damned
- Followed by: By Blood Alone

The Final Battle is a military science fiction novel by William C. Dietz, first published by Ace Books in 1995. This is the second book in the 9 book legion series by Dietz.

The Confederacy is threatened by an uprising of the Hudathans, an unfeeling reptilian race that has built up its forces through stolen technology and millennia of civil war, and their only opponents are the members of the Legion.
