= Tyre Coast Nature Reserve =

Nature reserve in Lebanon

Coordinates: 33°15′02.8″N 35°12′45.9″E

Designations

Ramsar Wetland
- Official name: Tyre Beach
- Designated: 16 April 1999
- Reference no.: 980

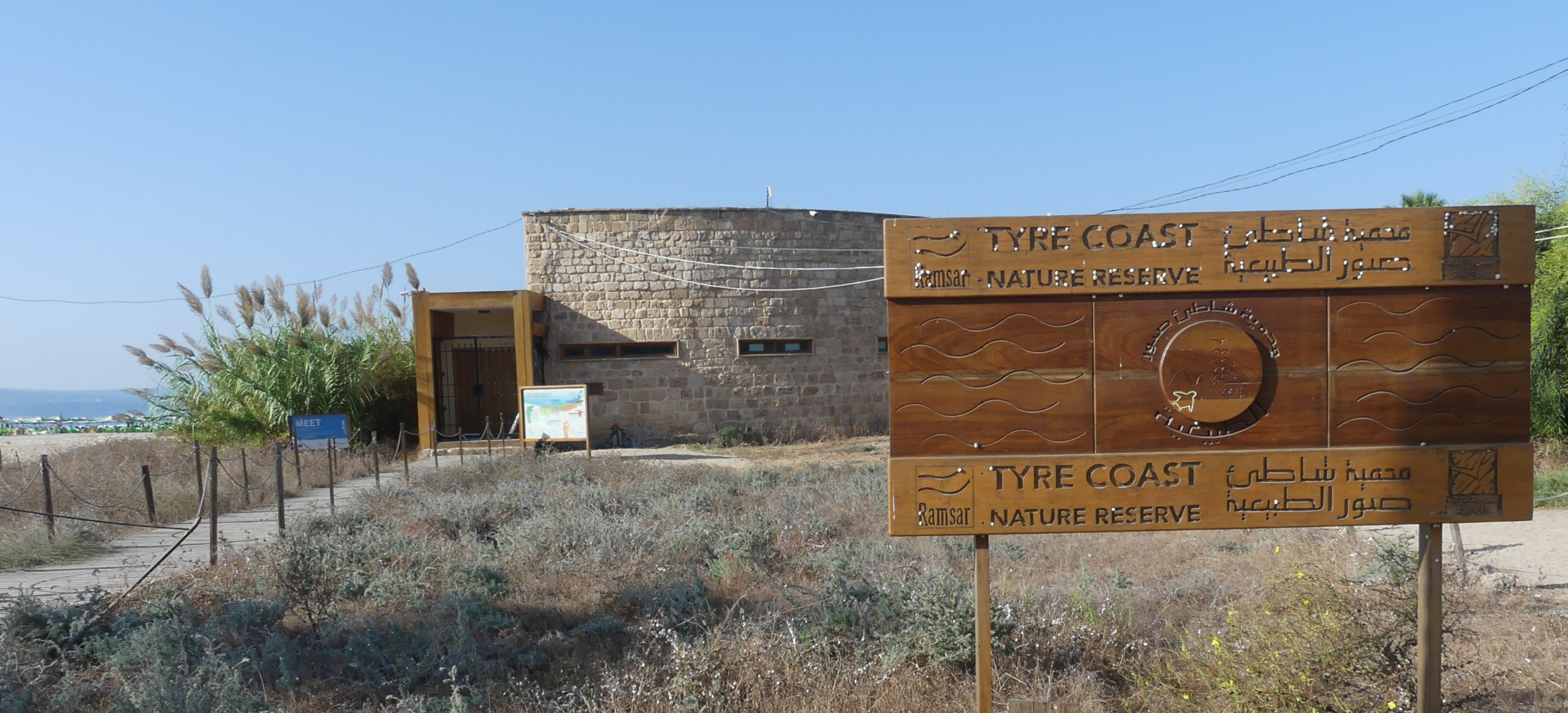
Tyre Coast Nature Reserve

The Tyre Coast Nature Reserve (TCNR) is a nature reserve and a Ramsar site southeast of Tyre, Lebanon. Covering an area of over 380 hectares (940 acres), it is bisected by the Rashidieh refugee camp.

== Description ==
It is 3.5 kilometres (2.2 mi) long and covers over 380 hectares (940 acres). It is divided into two sections separated by the Rashidieh refugee camp: a 1.8-kilometre (1.1 mi)-long, 500-metre (550 yd)-wide sand-lined beach, running from the Tyre Rest House in the north to the refugee camp in the south, and a 2-kilometre (1.2 mi) stretch of agriculture lands consisting of small family farms ranging from Rashidieh to the village of Chaetiyeh in the south, with the ancient Phoenician springs of Ras al-Ayn to the east. Both sections also encompass Lebanese territorial waters in the Mediterranean Sea.

It is further divided into three zones: the tourism zone (with the 900-metre [3000-foot]-long public beach); the agricultural and archaeological zone; and the conservation zone, which contains the springs of Ras al-Ayn.

The TCNR is within the best preserved stretch of sandy coastline in southern Lebanon and contains the largest sandy beach within the country.

== Climate ==
Temperatures range from an average high of 30.8 °C (87.4 °F) in August to an average low of 10 °C (50 °F) in January, with a yearly average of 20.8 °C (69.4 °F). The mean annual precipitation is 645 millimetres (25.4 in), with May to October being the dry season.

== Flora and fauna ==
It was established in 1999 by Law No. 708 as an important sanctuary for wildlife. Due to its diverse flora and fauna, the reserve is also a Ramsar Site.

It is an important nesting site for migratory birds and the endangered loggerhead and green sea turtles and harbors the Arabian spiny mouse, wall lizards, common pipistrelles, and European badgers. Globally endangered bird species include:

- pygmy cormorant (Phalacrocorax pygmeus)
- Dalmatian pelican (Pelecanus crispus)
- lesser kestrel (Falco naumanni)
- corn crake (Crex crex)

In all, it is home to 275 species from 50 families; seven are regionally and nationally threatened species, 4 are endemic and 10 are rare species.

The flora is dominated by members of the Gramineae, Fabaceae, Asteraceae and Umbellifereae families. Cyperus laevigatus, Arthrocnemum macrostachyum and Heterotheca subaxillaris are also present.

== See also ==
- 2021 Mediterranean oil spill
