= John Bullock (rugby league) =

English rugby league footballer

Personal information
- Full name: John Bullock
- Died: December 2009

Playing information
- Position: Scrum-half
Club
Years	Team	Pld	T	G	FG	P
1955–57	Wakefield Trinity	12	3	0	0	9

John "Johnny" Bullock was a professional rugby league footballer who played in the 1950s. He played at club level for Wakefield Trinity, as a scrum-half.

== Notable tour matches ==
Johnny Bullock played scrum-half in Wakefield Trinity's 17–12 victory over Australia in the 1956–57 Kangaroo tour of Great Britain and France match at Belle Vue, Wakefield on Monday 10 December 1956.
