= John Bulloch (author) =

John Bulloch (25 October 1805–17 December 1882), writer on Shakespeare's text, was a working brass-finisher of Aberdeen, where he died at the close of December 1882, in his seventy-eighth year. He devoted much of his time to literary pursuits, and contributed to the Athenæum several articles on decimal coinage. The works of Shakespeare were, however, the chief subject of his study: and when William George Clark became editor of the The Cambridge Shakespeare in 1863, Bulloch suggested a number of textual emendations which were introduced into the notes of that edition. In 1878 he published by subscription Studies on the Text of Shakespeare, where he evinces a very shrewd capacity in textual criticism. Bulloch lived in very humble circumstances, and in the preface to his Studies he thanks a number of friends for loans of the commonest books of reference.
