= The Final Battle =

The Final Battle or Final Battle may refer to:

== Literature ==
- The Final Battle (novel), a 1995 novel
- Spider-Girl: Final Battle!, an alternate name for Inside the Beast, a 2004–2005 Spider-Girl graphic novel by Tom DeFalco
- Terminator Salvation: The Final Battle, a comic book series based on the film Terminator Salvation

== Television ==
- "The Final Battle" (Once Upon a Time), an episode of the television series Once Upon a Time
- V: The Final Battle, a miniseries
- "The Final Battle, Part 1" and "The Final Battle, Part 2", episodes of the television series Ben 10: Alien Force
- "A Regular Epic Final Battle", an episode of the television series Regular Show

== Music ==
- The Final Battle (Stryper album), an album by Stryper
- The Final Battle I, an EP by Manowar
- "The Final Battle", song by Jay Chou from the 2002 album The Eight Dimensions
- The Final Battle: Sly & Robbie vs. Roots Radics, an album by Sly and Robbie and Roots Radics

== See also ==
- Final Battle, a professional wrestling event, held annually by the Ring of Honor promotion
- The Final Battle (video game), a 1990 video game
- Dragon Ball Z: A Lonesome, Final Battle – The Father of Z Warrior Son Goku, who Challenged Freeza, a Japanese title for the film Dragon Ball Z: Bardock – The Father of Goku
