= The Final Conflict (video game) =

1982 video game

- Publisher: Hayden Software
- Designer: Thomas G. Cleaver
- Platforms: Apple II, Atari 8-bit
- Release: 1982: Apple II; 1983: Atari 8-bit
- Genre: Turn-based strategy
- Modes: Single-player, multiplayer

The Final Conflict is a strategy video game written by Thomas G. Cleaver for the Apple II and published by Hayden Software in 1982. A version for Atari 8-bit computers followed in 1983.

== Gameplay ==
The Final Conflict is a game in which two robot armies continue the war started by dead human civilizations.

== Reception ==
Richard Steinberg reviewed The Final Conflict in Space Gamer No. 64. Steinberg commented that "All in all, Final Conflict is a game that should bring you many hours of good, clean war-making. This isn't any easy game; you'll need your thinking cap for this one."
