= Legion of the Damned (novel) =

1993 novel by William C. Dietz

- 1993 mass market edition (paperback)
- Author: William C. Dietz
- Language: English
- Genre: Military science fiction
- Published: August 1, 1993 Ace Books
- Publication place: United States
- Media type: Print (Paperback)
- Pages: 352 pp (paperback edition)
- ISBN: 0-441-48040-3
- OCLC: 28450164
- Followed by: The Final Battle

Legion of the Damned is a science fiction novel by William C. Dietz. It is the first entry in the Legion of the Damned series, initially published by Ace Books in 1993. Consisting of nine books, the final installment, A Fighting Chance, was released in 2011. Dietz later wrote a prequel trilogy: Andromeda's Fall (2012), Andromeda's Choice (2013), and Andromeda's War (2014).

== Plot summary ==
In the far future, the Human Empire has been attacked by the alien Hudatha, and humanity's last hope lies with the Legion (the successor to the French Foreign Legion), a fighting force composed of humans and cyborgs. When a patient is terminally ill, or a criminal receives the death penalty, they are able to avoid death by joining the Legion and becoming a cyborg. These soldiers are described as the most elite fighting force in the Empire.

== Reception ==
Sandra Scholes wrote of the storyline that, “Dietz sticks to what he is good at, the tactics, fight scenes and endless battles,” adding that he combines, “gritty and realistic life concepts with the guns and ammo that goes with them.” Publishers Weekly wrote that book is, “exciting and suspenseful … The humanity of the characters mixes well with the action to give this space drama real punch.”

== See also ==
- Military science fiction
