= Final War =

Final War or Final Wars may refer to:

== Fiction ==
- Final War, a term used in Honorverse, a military science-fiction book series by David Weber
- The Final War, a 1959 Japanese science fiction film made by Toei (released in U.S. in 1962)
- Final War, a 1968 novelette by Barry N. Malzberg
- Godzilla: Final Wars, a 2004 Japanese science-fiction kaiju film directed by Ryuhei Kitamura
- "Final Wars", a song by Buckethead from his 2006 studio album The Elephant Man's Alarm Clock

== History ==
- War of Actium, the final war of the Roman Republic
- Byzantine–Sasanian War of 602–628, the last war between the Byzantine Empire and Persia
- World War I, The War to End All Wars, or the Great War
