= The Final Fight =

The Final Fight or variant may refer to:

- Ip Man: The Final Fight, 2013 film
- Turrican II: The Final Fight, 1991 video game
- Street Fighter 2010: The Final Fight, 1990 video game
- Final Fight, series of video games from Capcom
  - Final Fight (video game), 1989 arcade video game
  - Mighty Final Fight, 1993 video game
  - Final Fight 2, 1993 video game
  - Final Fight 3, 1995 video game
  - Final Fight Revenge, 1999 video game
  - Final Fight: Streetwise, 2006 video game

== See also ==
- Final Fight Championship, European fight promoter
