= John Bulloch (journalist) =

Welsh journalist (1928–2010)

John Angel Bulloch (15 April 1928 – 18 November 2010) was a foreign correspondent for the Daily Telegraph.

He was born in Penarth, Glamorganshire. His father, a Merchant Navy captain, was killed in Barcelona during the Spanish Civil War. Bulloch followed his father's career as a seaman for several years before turning to journalism. His first job, aged 23, was with the Western Mail. The spelling of his birth name was Bullock but he changed it following a typo in his first byline. He joined the Daily Telegraph in 1958.

He was based in Beirut for 7 years. In 1988 he joined the Independent becoming Diplomatic Editor for the Independent on Sunday until his retirement in 1991.

== Publications ==
- Bulloch, John; Miller, Henry (1961). Spy Ring: The Full Story of the Naval Secrets Case. London: Martin Secker & Warburg. OCLC 1926529.
- Final Conflict. The War in Lebanon. (1983). Century London. ISBN 0-7126-0171-6
- The Gulf War : Its Origins, History and Consequences. with Harvey Morris. (1989) Methuen London. ISBN 0-413-61370-4
