= Street Fighter: The Movie =

Street Fighter: The Movie may refer to:

- Street Fighter II: The Animated Movie, a 1994 Japanese animated film (also known as Street Fighter II Movie)
  - Street Fighter II: The Animated Movie Game, a 1995 interactive movie game for the PlayStation and Sega Saturn released only in Japan
- Street Fighter, a 1994 American live-action film
  - Street Fighter: The Movie (arcade game), a coin-operated video game based on the live-action film
  - Street Fighter: The Movie (console video game), a video game released for the PlayStation and Sega Saturn also based on the live-action film
- Street Fighter, a 2026 American live-action film
