= Street Fighter: The Movie (arcade game) =

1995 video game

- Arcade flyer featuring Jean-Claude Van Damme as Guile
- Developer: Incredible Technologies
- Publisher: Capcom
- Designers: Leif Pran Marwede; Alan Noon
- Programmer: Jane Siegrist
- Artist: Ralph Melgosa
- Composer: Kyle Johnson
- Platform: Arcade
- Release: NA: March 1995; JP: 1995
- Genre: Fighting
- Modes: Single-player, multiplayer
- Arcade system: Incredible Technologies 32-bit

Street Fighter: The Movie is a 1995 fighting game developed by Incredible Technologies and published by Capcom for arcades. The game is based on the 1994 film Street Fighter, itself based on the fighting game series of the same name, and uses digitized images of the film's cast. The game was widely panned by critics.

A home console video game, also titled Street Fighter: The Movie, was released for the PlayStation and Sega Saturn. It is not a port, but a separately produced game based on the same premise.

== Gameplay ==
Ryu faces Akuma.

Street Fighter: The Movie differs from the previous Street Fighter II games in several ways. The game gives a greater emphasis towards air combos or "juggling" than previous games: the player can continuously attack their opponent while they are falling in the air with a series of attacks.

Many of the returning Street Fighter characters feature new Special Moves exclusive to the game, such as Bison's "Electric Arc", Cammy's "Whip Choke", and Guile's "Handcuff" (a Special Move based on a glitch in the original Street Fighter II). Characters such as Zangief and Balrog now have the ability to deflect projectile attacks back to their opponent. Many of these new Special Moves require the player to hold down a specific attack button, input a directional-based command on the joystick and then release the button.

The method for grappling attacks was reversed for the game: performing the throw command while holding the joystick towards an opponent will throw the opponent to the opposite direction and vice versa. Player has the option of inputting a specific command to "escape" a throw with no damage or perform a "counter throw". However, a character can counterattack a "counter throw" by performing a "reverse", while reversing a counter throw can ultimately be countered with a "slam master" technique.

Other techniques exclusive to this game include "interrupt moves", which are performed after blocking an opponent's attacks, and "comeback moves", which are special moves that can only be used when the player's life gauge is on the "danger" level. These would later return in Street Fighter Alpha as Alpha Counters and in Street Fighter IV as Ultra Combos. The Super Combo gauge from Super Street Fighter II Turbo is featured in the game. Most of the characters in the game have at least two Super Combo moves: one that leaves a trail of blue shadows and another that leaves a trail of red shadows. In addition to Super Combos, the players can also perform a "Regeneration" move when their Super Combo gauge is full to restore a portion of their vitality gauge. This would later be seen in Street Fighter EX3 and Street Fighter III.

The standard single-player mode consists of a series of 14 matches (including a clone match), ending with a final match against M. Bison. There are also several secret game modes, including a Tag Team Mode. In a Tag Team match, the player gets to choose two characters and fight against other tag teams in single-round matches, switching to the second character only after the first one has been defeated.

Each fighter's ending sequence consists of a promotional still or two from the movie with accompanying text describing the character's fate after the events of the tournament, followed by the staff roll.

== Characters ==
The game's cast contains most of the characters from Super Street Fighter II Turbo, with the exceptions of Fei Long (who was not used for the movie), Dee Jay, T. Hawk, Blanka (although he appears as a rare easter egg, by jumping into the stage and electrocuting himself before leaving) and Dhalsim. Akuma, who was a hidden character in Super Turbo and X-Men: Children of the Atom, is a regular character for the first time in any game. Two new characters were also introduced: Sawada, an original character from the film, and Blade, a member of Bison's shock troops from the film. Arkane, F7 and Khyber, who are all palette swaps of Blade, appear as secret characters. A powered-up version of Bison (called S. Bison) appears as a final computer-controlled opponent exclusive to the game's Tag-Team Mode and can be selected via codes like the other secret characters. While Blanka and Dee Jay would be added to the selectable cast of the home versions, there is leftover data in the arcade game indicating that Blanka was meant to be a playable character in this version as well, as there is an ending for him accessed by playing as S. Bison in the arcade mode.

Street Fighter: The Movie is the only game in the series where the boss characters Balrog, Vega and Bison, as well as Akuma, are addressed by their western names in the Japanese release. The Japanese instruction card features the original Japanese names of the characters written next to the western names in parentheses to avoid confusion.

The actors in the film are credited with reprising their roles for the game, with some of the actors dressed differently so as to more closely resemble their video game counterparts. While Raul Julia is credited as Bison, his likeness only appears in archive footage from the film. Julia's stunt double, Darko Tuscan, was used to digitize the character in the game instead. Additionally, Guile is simultaneously played by stuntman Mark Stefanich, due to Van Damme only being available for four hours.

- Akuma – Ernie Reyes, Sr.
- Balrog – Grand L. Bush
- Blade (Arkane/Khyber/F7) – Alan Noon
- Cammy – Kylie Minogue/Emma Kearney
- Chun-Li – Ming-Na Wen
- E. Honda – Peter Tuiasosopo
- Guile – Jean-Claude Van Damme, Mark Stefanich
- Ken – Damian Chapa
- M. Bison – Raúl Juliá, Darko Tuscan
- Ryu – Byron Mann
- Sagat – Wes Studi
- Sawada – Kenya Sawada
- Vega – Jay Tavare
- Zangief – Andrew Bryniarski

Characters each had between 600–800 digitized frames of animation, for a total of 32 megabytes of graphics. Each character had a 256 colour palette, compared with 16 colors in previous CPS-based Street Fighter games, and 64 colors in Mortal Kombat.

== Development ==
Capcom, owner of the Street Fighter franchise and financier of the Street Fighter movie, contracted Incredible Technologies to develop Street Fighter: The Movie because it had experience with both fighting games and digitized graphics. As Incredible Technologies was a small company which had only handled low budget releases before, the staff were not sure they could do justice to a high-profile project like Street Fighter: The Movie, but accepted the job so that they could keep themselves financially afloat and finance their own independent projects.

To get the footage needed for the digitized character graphics, a five-person team consisting of Incredible Technologies president and CEO Elaine Hodgson, co-owner Richard Ditton, game designer Alan Noon, project manager Leif Marwede, and art director Ralph Melgosa went to the film set in Australia with rented camera equipment. The shoot was planned to take less than two weeks, but after the team arrived the actors demanded that they get a share of the game's royalties, so the Incredible Technologies team had to stay in Australia several more weeks while the actors negotiated with Capcom, with Capcom footing the bill for their room and board.

Marwede and Noon handled all the choreography. Many of the actors lacked the agility to perform all of the required moves, so Marwede would often hold them in position for a shot, and the team erased Marwede from the footage in post-production.

For the most part Incredible Technologies received no input or oversight from Capcom, but towards the end of development a group from Capcom Japan visited Incredible Technologies' offices in Chicago to check up on the game. The visit was tense, as the Capcom Japan staff were less than happy with the game, and Akira Yasuda and Katsuya Akitomo both recalled that Yoshiki Okamoto seemed angry much of the time. It was too late to make any major changes, so the Capcom Japan group simply offered some suggestions and made small adjustments to the graphics.

== Reception ==
Reception

Review score
Publication	Score
Next Generation	2/5

In Japan, Game Machine listed Street Fighter: The Movie as the thirteenth most successful arcade game of July 1995. In North America, RePlay reported it to be the ninth most popular arcade game of July 1995. According to Maximum, the game "was reasonably successful in the arcades."

Next Generation reviewed the arcade version of the game, rating it two stars out of five, and stated that "Despite this digital crossover – neither brilliantly conceived nor sleepily dull – this game features the former fighting moves from Super Street Fighter II Turbo and excellent new ones [...] which adds to the growing Street Fighter series' depth."
