= Ryu (Street Fighter) =

Video game character

- Street Fighter character
- Ryu in the Project X Zone series performing the Hadoken
- First game: Street Fighter (1987)
- Created by: Takashi Nishiyama
- Designed by: Manabu Takemura (Street Fighter); Shoei Okano (Street Fighter II); Kaname Fujioka (Street Fighter 6)
- Portrayed by: Byron Mann (Street Fighter film, games); Jon Foo (Legacy); Mike Moh (Assassin's Fist); Peter Jang (Power Rangers); Andrew Koji (Street Fighter film)
- Voiced by: Hiroki Takahashi (2008–present, Japanese); Kyle Hebert (2009–present, English) Others (Games): Hitoshi Nishio (Note: Nishio provided the "Hadoken" voice line.) and Toshiharu Matsunaga (Note: Matsunaga provided the "Tatsumaki Senpukyaku" voice line.) (Street Fighter II series); Katashi Ishizuka (SFA–SFA2, XvSF, MSHvSF, SFEX series, MvC2); Sōichirō Hoshi (Super Puzzle Fighter II Turbo, Pocket Fighter); Wataru Takagi (SFIII: New Generation and SFIII: Second Impact); Toshiyuki Morikawa (MvC, SFA3, CvS series, Capcom Fighting Evolution, N×C); Tōru Ōkawa (SFIII: Third Strike); Vincent Tong (Puzzle Fighter); Others (Film, Japanese): Kojiro Shimizu (SFII animated film); Kōji Tsujitani (SFII V); Kane Kosugi (SFA: The Animation); Yasuyuki Kase (SFA Generations); Taketora (Wreck-It Ralph); Others (Film, English): Skip Stellrecht (SFII animated film, SFII V Animaze, SFA: The Animation); Brett Weaver (SFII V, ADV #1); Tommy Drake (SFII V, ADV #2); Tong Lung (TV series); Richard Cansino (SFA: Generations)

In-universe information
- Fighting style: Ansatsuken
- Origin: Japan
- Nationality: Japanese

Ryu (/riˈuː/; Japanese: リュウ, Hepburn: Ryū) is the protagonist of the video game series Street Fighter by Capcom. He was introduced in the original Street Fighter (1987) alongside his friend and rival Ken Masters. Later games show Ryu's training and dedication to being the strongest fighter he can be, befriending new fighters.

Unable to control his dark nature, Ryu develops two alter egos throughout the series: Evil Ryu (殺意の波動に目覚めたリュウ, Satsui no Hadō ni Mezameta Ryū), a version with his evil intent awakened, and Kage (影ナル者, Kagenaru Mono), a separate entity who is the physical embodiment of that evil intent. Mastering the dark nature is Ryu's main objective to become stronger. He has appeared as a playable character in several crossover game franchises, including Marvel vs. Capcom, SNK vs. Capcom, Project X Zone, and Super Smash Bros. He is featured in manga and anime adaptations, as well as the 1994 live-action film and the 2026 live-action film.

Ryu was created by Takashi Nishiyama, who was inspired by the South Korean-born martial artist Mas Oyama. For his second appearance, Ryu's design changed from a young fighter to a skilled karate practitioner. However, because of issues in the making of Street Fighter II, he possessed a major weakness within the cast. For the next titles, Ryu's fighting style was modified, so he had different skills, with Evil Ryu and Kage possessing more diverse moves. Multiple Japanese and English actors have voiced him. While his appearance remained mostly intact, Street Fighter 6 gave Ryu a major redesign in reference to his master Gouken.

A pop culture icon, Ryu has become one of the most iconic video game characters ever, inspiring several other fighters through his alter egos while his friendship and rivalry with Ken were praised for how different they developed despite being nearly the same in their introductions. The character also received mixed responses for recycling an archetype of the corrupted protagonist in the form of Evil Ryu and Kage. In Street Fighter 6, Ryu's appearance was crticized for its sex appeal.

== Creation and development ==
=== Origins ===
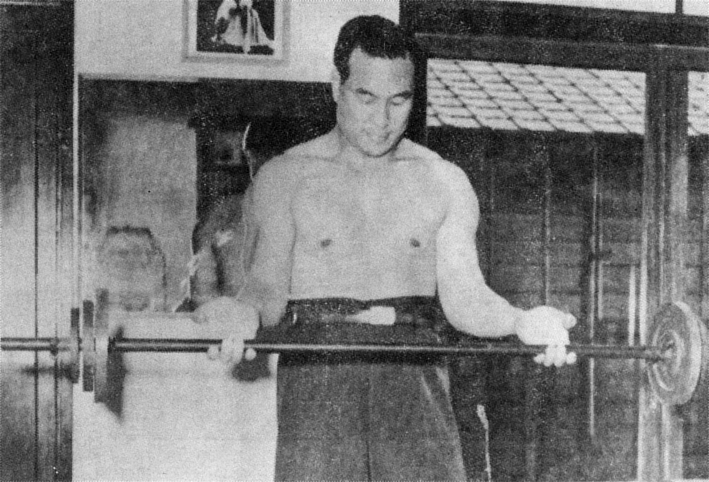
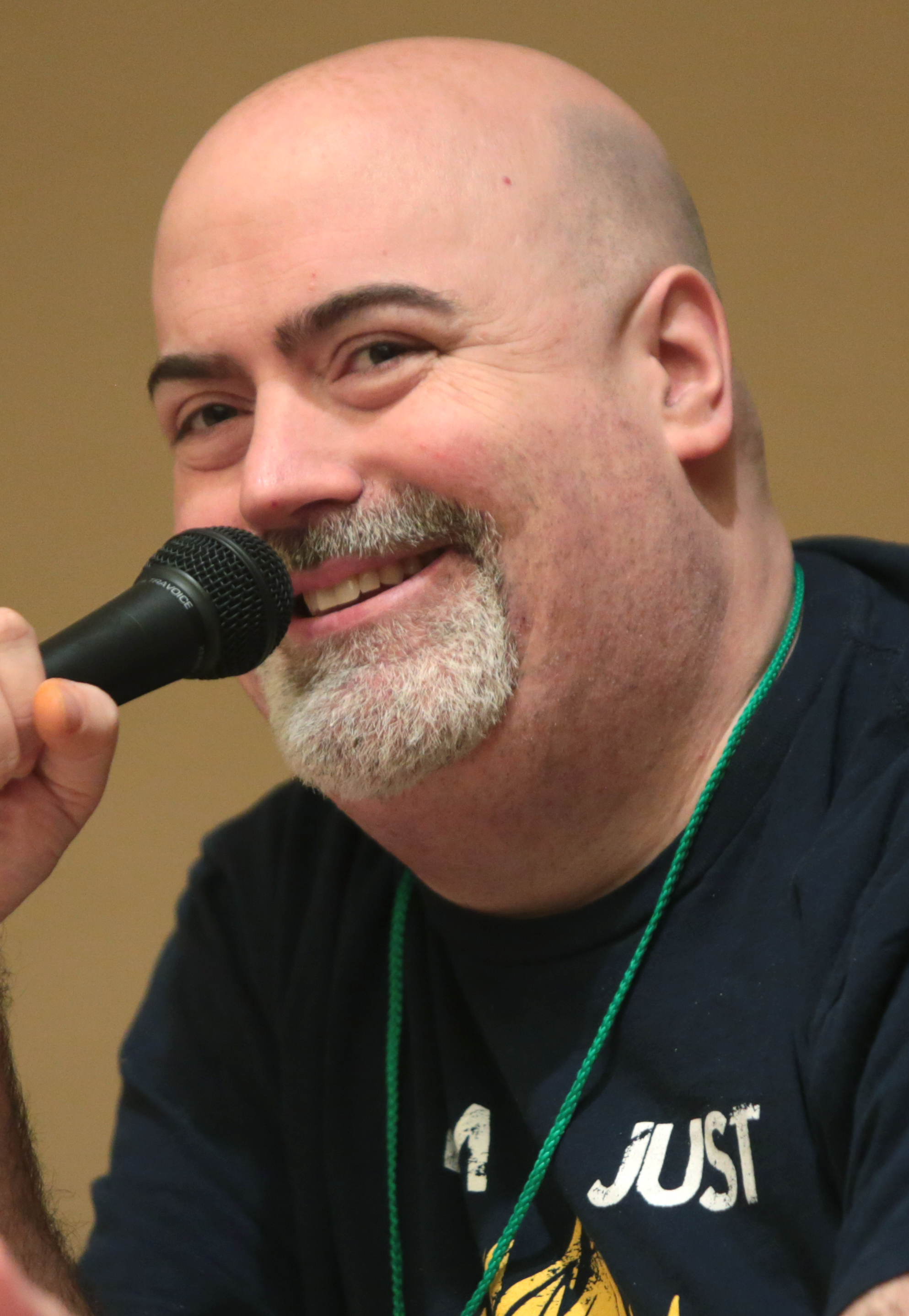
Mas Oyama (left) inspired Ryu's character. Kyle Hebert has voiced him in English since Street Fighter IV (2008)

Before the creation of Ryu as the main protagonist of the first Street Fighter game, Capcom designer Takashi Nishiyama had initially envisioned a different character for the role. The original concept was for a Caucasian man donning a leather jacket, who even makes an appearance during the opening sequence of the game. However, this idea was eventually set aside in favor of creating a character who practiced karate and wore a traditional dougi, leading to the creation of Ryu. Still wanting to utilize the concept, after subsequently transitioning to SNK, Nishiyama later implemented the character as Terry Bogard, who debuted as the protagonist of 1991's Fatal Fury: King of Fighters.

Nishiyama's inspiration for Ryu was Mas Oyama, who was depicted as the protagonist in the kung fu manga and anime series Karate Master by Ikki Kajiwara. Nishiyama grew up watching the animated series, which was influenced by Oyama's life. Nishiyama was impressed by Oyama's martial arts skills and philosophies, and this inspired him to create the first Street Fighter game. Nishiyama wanted the game to have a story similar to a film, anime, or novel. Whereas Ryu was based on Oyama, his rival Sagat was also influenced by the protagonist's rivalry with a bald Muay Thai martial artist from the series. Ryu's name was based on Nishiyama's name because the on'yomi (Sino-Japanese pronunciation) of the character "Takashi" is "Ryū" (Mandarin: Lóng, 隆, lit. "dragon").

In an interview with Game On!, Capcom Research and Development head Noritaka Funamizu said that of the series' characters, Ryu was one of the most popular with American audiences, alongside Zangief and Guile. Ryu and Ken were programmatically identical except for Ryu's Shoryuken, which was slightly weaker due to a software mistake. (Note: According to an interview with Yoshiki Okamoto, "after a player does a Shoryuken, we were thinking of adding a weak point so their guard would be down.... We were going back and forth on whether we should include that in the game, and we decided not to do it, but we forgot to take that out of Ryu's code.") Ryu and Ken were mainly handled by Shoei, who had clear memories of designing the Hadoken and Shoryuken. Shoei Okano recalled they were originally going to be Y.S.-san's (Note: Y.S.-san was one of the four character designers of Street Fighter II and was initially in charge of Ryu and Ken designs, but Shoei Okano ended up taking over in the early stages of development.) characters in the early stages of development. He noted Ryu and Ken are the "so-called standard characters in the SFII world, and since they were coming from SFI, we could have the other characters be weirdos." As a result, the duo was redesigned to have a stoic feel.

Alpha 2 introduced the concept of a darker alter-ego influenced by Akuma, Evil Ryu.

=== Designs ===
Inspired by an alternate design from Street Fighter V and Gouken, Kaname Fujioka redesigned Ryu in Street Fighter 6.

Ryu wears a white gi, as a symbol of his Japanese heritage, with the Japanese symbols for the Fūrinkazan (風林火山 (Hepburn: "Wind, Forest, Fire, Mountain")) on his belt as well as a stylised version on his gloves. While many Street Fighter characters have been redesigned, Ryu's design has stayed largely the same. In Street Fighter II, the character was included because of presence in the first game, symbolizing the concept of a Japanese martial artist. As the series progressed, his design was made more muscular to coincide with the concept, while his white gi, considered his most defining characteristic by the development team, let viewers know he was "a karate master at first sight". For the Street Fighter Alpha games, Ryu was redesigned as a younger character, making him look closer to his original Street Fighter persona as Alpha was also seen as a remake. Artist Naoto "Bengus" Kuroshima noted that the expectations that come with drawing him or Chun-Li were greater compared to newcomers like Sakura Kasugano. When picking the cast of Street Fighter V, producer Yoshinori Ono said he wanted Ryu and the cast to differ from their previous characters; however, Ryu retained his original look in contrast to Ken.

In the three Street Fighter III games, the designers described the older Ryu as a more hardcore fighter. Despite being Japanese, Capcom described him as an American martial artist which led to the creation of Makoto whose design was based on an Eastern point of view. The staff still considered Ryu as a simple protagonist; however, they did not mind as they wanted him to contrast other flashy characters like the dynamic employed in Saint Seiya's cast. The original white bandana became red in Street Fighter II due to an oversight. Despite the bandana aiming to cover long hair, Akiman claimed that Capcom decided to keep his hair shorter to make him cooler. In Street Fighter X Tekken he was given a swap costume of him looking like a devil reflecting powers he has to control while an unused design gave him a futuristic style.

In previews of Street Fighter V, Ryu was noted to have a more realistic look to the point of being compared to the Tekken characters. Capcom said this approach to Street Fighter V's artistic design, focused on two main points: making the art "easy to follow and understand" and creating a "personality with artistic accents". In Street Fighter V, Ryu's costumes included references to Kairi, Mega Man, and Jin Saotome. For the Championship Edition of the game, new moves were added to make Ryu a more defensive fighter.

To update Ryu's image while staying true to his character, Capcom created his alternative alter ego Evil Ryu. However, it was not until Street Fighter IV that the staff decided to give him a more unique design. Capcom felt that Evil Ryu was a success among players. While Bison was introduced as the series' main nemesis, the inclusion of Akuma added more conflict to Ryu's story, allowing him to develop Evil Ryu.

For Street Fighter IV, Kyle Hebert was chosen to play the role of Ryu in anticipation of the revival of his "Evil Ryu" alter ego. The director of localization, Taliesin Jaffe, informed Hebert that he gave him the role because of Evil Ryu. In further elaborating on this idea, Jaffe mentioned that Ryu was originally meant to be a character similar to Lancelot, and he was expecting the character to undergo corruption right from the start. During Kyle's initial audition, he was requested to read a few lines in a darker tone. The team aimed to prevent Ryu from being portrayed as a typical Japanese hero and create a differentiation between his and Ken's personalities.

As downloadable content, Capcom created another alter ego of Ryu in Street Fighter V named Kage who represents the Satsui no Hado Ryu rejected. In the early stages of development, Kage had a noticeably different design. His entire body showed no skin as it was covered in purple. Designing the character did not take too much time according to Takayuki Nakayama. His "design was nailed down pretty quick, so there aren't many prototype images that can be shown." He was loosely based on Ryu's dark persona from Street Fighter Alpha game's Evil Ryu. According to developers, Ryu rejecting Kage ends the chapter of the Satsui no Hado as Ryu became able to control such inner darkness.

In Street Fighter 6, Ryu is bearded and wears a kasaya, a Buddhist robe, which is similar to his master, Gouken, as well as inspired by his alternate design from Street Fighter V that helped to expand his sex appeal. While game is set after the events of 3rd Strike which ends with Ryu becoming wiser, director Takayuki Nakayama said "not there yet" - though he seems to have gained some dignity. He is also no longer barefoot and wears sandals instead.

=== Gameplay ===
Capcom regularly calls Ryu's fighting style "Ansatsuken Karate", despite also mentioning others such as Kyokushin, Shotokan, Kempo, Taekwondo and Judo.

Ryu has three special techniques. The first is the Hadouken (波動拳, hadōken) energy attack. This was based on the wave motion gun from the titular spacecraft in the sci-fi anime series Space Battleship Yamato, which Nishiyama watched during the 1970s. His other two techniques from the first Street Fighter game, Shoryuken (昇龍拳, Shōryūken) and Tatsumaki Senpukyaku (竜巻旋風脚) were inspired by actual martial arts moves, which were exaggerated for the character. Because Ryu was the only playable character in the original Street Fighter game, his designer Manabu Takemura wanted him to be easy for players to relate to. These three moves were reused in Street Fighter IV by Ryu's master Gouken. Gouken's attacks were stronger based on Kamei's desire to make the master more skilled in comparison. In general, Ryu became a challenging character to master as he relies on projectiles and leg sweeps.

Ryu develops stronger versions of the Hadoken due to a desire of Akira Nishitani and Akira Yasuda in regards to the size of the move in Street Fighter II. Shoei Okano animated the new Hadoken. While Ryu and Ken have the same moves in every game, Ken was given flashier combos. Sagat was also designed as another of Ryu's rivals as both have similar uppercut in the form of Ryu's Shoryuken and Sagat's Tiger Uppercut. The first enhanced Hadoken is the "Shinku Hadoken" (真空波動拳 Shinkū Hadōken, lit. "Vacuum/True Void Surge Fist") in Super Street Fighter II Turbo which Street Fighter Alpha 2 describes as Gouken's creation but Ryu learned it on his own after defeating Sagat. In Undisputed Street Fighter: A 30th Anniversary Retrospective, it was noted that while Ken nearly the same as Ryu, his redesign in Street Fighter V helped to improve his popularity thanks to its more original take. This also was helped by the fact that Ken's special moves have flames in contrast to Ryu's electric moves like the Denjin Hadoken (電刃波動拳, Denjin Hadōken; lit. "Electric Blade Surge Fist) originally introduced in Street Fighter III. The color of the electricity generated from inside the body is yellow, while artificial or electricity generated from the outside is blue. Ryu and Gouken utilize both Hadou and electric current when using Denjin Hadoken. The Denjin Hadoken is said to be learned once Ryu becomes able to master the "Satsui no Hado." Meanwhile, Kage uses the Shakunetsu Hadoken (灼熱波動拳, lit. "Blazing Surge Fist") which is far more enhanced than previous Hadokens.

Director Hideaki Itsuno remembers he was not allowed to work on Ryu because of his inexperience in making games. As a result, Itsuno worked on creating new characters for the series which could rival Ryu and Ken. While Ryu has retained his original white gi outfit in most games, Capcom tried using an alternate high school uniform for Street Fighter V where he was presented as a rebel. The concept for Ryu was "leader"—leader of a student group or a bunch of delinquents. Super deformed versions of this image were used by the company as April Fool's jokes.

While originally conceived as a character for fighting game newcomers, Ryu has been balanced across the series with 3rd Strike focusing on his defense. This balancing affected the character negatively to the point multiple expert players said that in Street Fighter V he was unsuitable for competitive fights. In 2019, Capcom patched the character, which garnered a positive response from fans. In the manga based on Street Fighter Alpha, Ryu also develops a stronger version of the Shoryuken against M. Bison he calls "Shin Shoryuken" (真・昇龍拳, Shin Shōryūken; lit. "True Rising Dragon Fist"). The same technique was incorporated into the games as Yuichiro Hiraki enjoyed and for V he wanted the execution to be simplified. The Street Fighter 6 persona of Ryu was noted to be more complex by Red Bull for his new Hashogeki (波掌撃, Hashōgeki; lit. "Wave Palm Attack") as well as the electric Denjin Charge (電刃錬気 Denjin Renki, lit. "Electric Blade Refined Qi") which opens strategies for new combos and can be followed up with a Tatsumaki for a major combat.

=== Spin-offs and other media ===
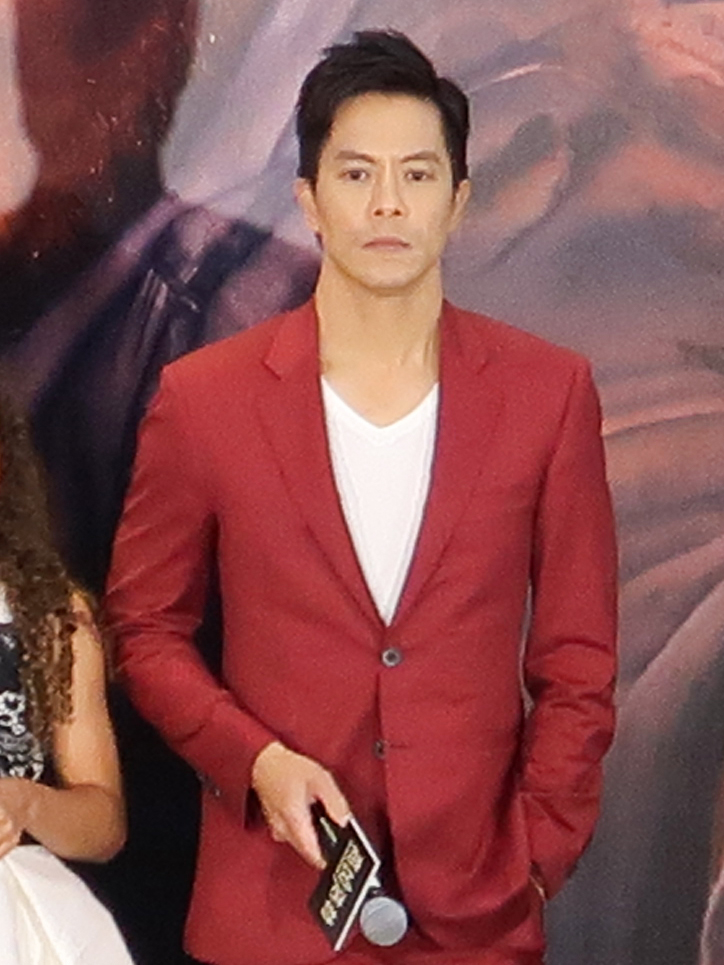
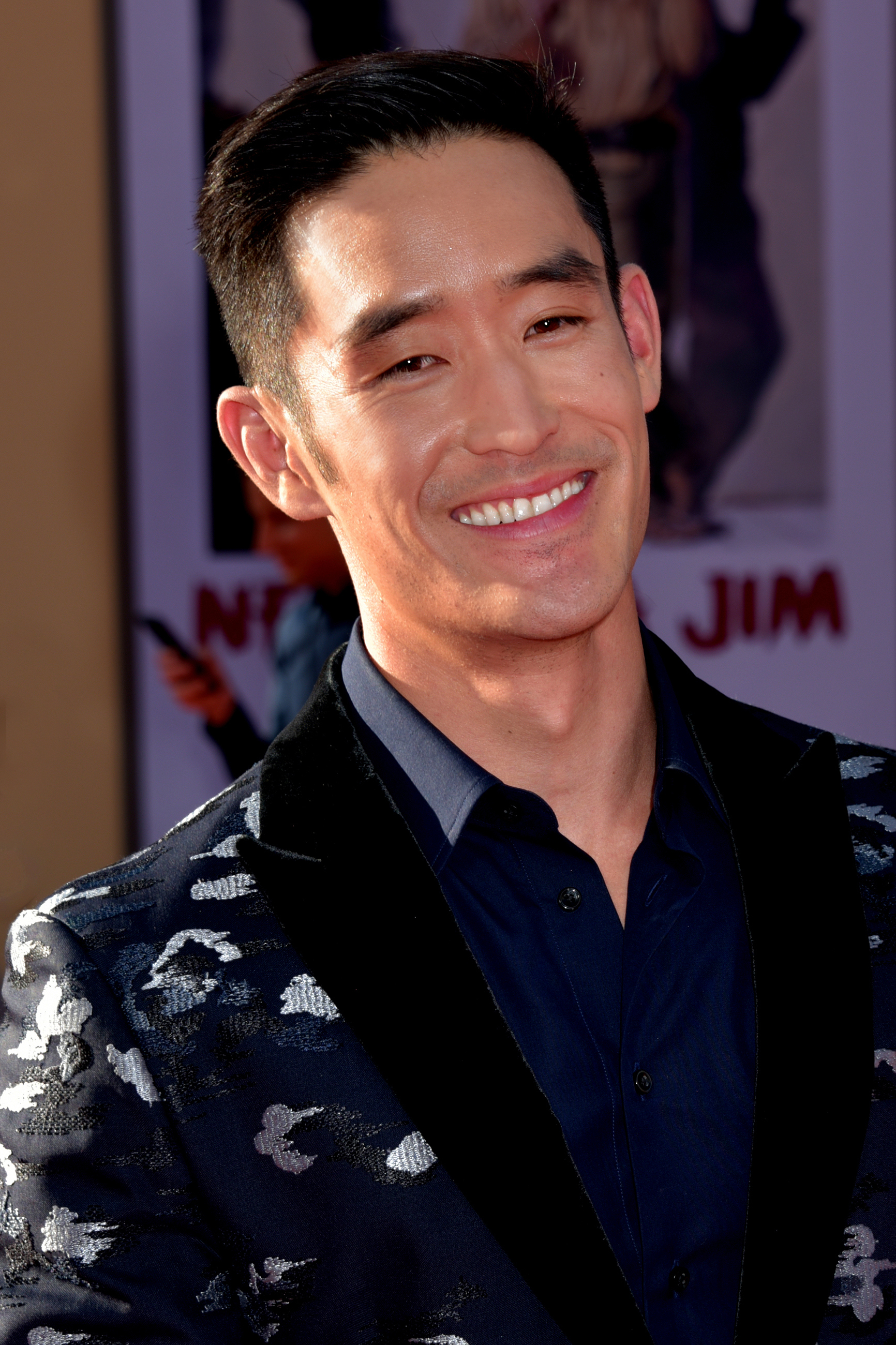
Byron Mann and Mike Moh have portrayed Ryu in the live-action film and the webseries, respectively

Comic book writer Len Strazewski wanted to tell a more dramatic storyline for Ryu based in a comic book narrative. Like storylines involving chaos, Strazewski wrote a comic in which Ryu was the center of attention as he sought revenge. As a result, to find a motivation for Ryu's character, he planned to kill his best friend Ken Masters. However, since the comic book was cancelled after its third issue, this plot was never fully explored. Mangaka Masahiko Nakahira, the creator of Evil Ryu, wrote his own take on Ryu during his career, aiming for a more serious take on Ryu's personality in his works.

Actor Byron Mann said in the making of the live-action Ryu he had no knowledge of Ryu's identity or what Street Fighter was originally about. Director Steven E. de Souza wanted Mann to play Ryu, but Capcom was not keen because they had their own actor, Kenya Sawada, who had played the character in various promotions in Japan. Sawada would play a more serious Ryu in contrast to Mann's portrayal. Nevertheless, DeSouza was able to use Mann in the film as Sawada's English was not good. Sawada played a character written for him: Captain Sawada. Ken Masters' actor, Damian Chapa, said the name is pronounced "Rye-you" as opposed to "Ree-you". Despite issues with this, DeSouza decided to use "Rye-you" believing it would be easier to pronounce for Western audiences.

Ryu's inclusion in Street Fighter EX was deemed natural by the studio, Arika, with producer Ichiro Mihara describing him as one of the three essential Street Fighter characters along with Chun-Li and Ken. Ansah talked about Ryu and Ken's story in Street Fighter: Assassin's Fist and said "a good analogy with Ryu is that he's not actually ever competing with anyone else; he's competing with himself. Whereas Ken is driven fiercely by competition." For the game, Tekken X Street Fighter, producer Katsuhiro Harada commented that while Ryu might be able to perform his classic moves like the Hadouken reassuring his fans, most of his normal moves would be changed to play more like a Tekken character and fit the cast. Game designer Masahiro Sakurai said that for Super Smash Bros., Ryu was recreated to showcase his Street Fighter II persona while having new moves because the controller had more buttons. Nevertheless, he was given a technique from Street Fighter III and new techniques exclusive to Smash. The Shoryuken was implemented as his strongest technique.

== Appearances ==
=== In Street Fighter games ===
Ryu debuted in the first Street Fighter as the primary playable character, with his best friend, rival, and sparring partner Ken Masters serving as the second player's character. Both compete to test their strength against the tournament's champion, Sagat. His next appearance was in 1991's Street Fighter II. Set several years after Ryu defeated Sagat in the first tournament, Ryu participates in a second tournament. In his ending in the game, Ryu wins the tournament but does not stay for the ceremony, already seeking his next challenge. The Ultra Street Fighter II: The Final Challengers version of the game added Evil Ryu as a hidden character although the narrative does not explore this take on Ryu.

Ryu's backstory, along with those of other Street Fighter characters, would be explored in the subsequent Street Fighter Alpha prequel series. The first game, Street Fighter Alpha: Warriors' Dreams (1995), features Ryu confronting Sagat as his last opponent in a rematch following their first game. Street Fighter Alpha 2 (1996) depicts Ryu on a quest to confront Akuma, his master's brother and enemy. After their match, Akuma reveals that Ryu possesses the "Evil Intent" (殺意の波動, Satsui no Hadō; lit. "Surge of Murderous Intent", sometimes translated as the "Dark Hadou") within him, the same power Akuma uses.

In the Street Fighter Alpha series, there is an alternative selectable version of Ryu known as "Evil Ryu". Like Akuma, Ryu takes this form when succumbing to the evil intent and becomes more violent. It was not until the international versions of the game, Street Fighter Alpha 2, that Evil Ryu was introduced as a playable secret character. Evil Ryu was originally introduced in a 1996 Street Fighter Zero manga series by Masahiko Nakahira; the character was later adapted in the Street Fighter canon by Capcom. In Street Fighter Alpha 3 (1998), a man named M. Bison seeks Ryu to use him as his next host body. The two clash and Ryu emerges victorious, causing Bison to retreat. If Evil Ryu is used, he clashes with Akuma to decide who is the strongest user of Dark Hadou.

Ryu and Ken return in Street Fighter III (1997) and its updates. While Ryu's motivation and rivalry with Ken would remain the same, he was also shown getting acquainted with several of the new characters featured in the game. Ryu appears in Street Fighter IV, which takes place after Street Fighter II but before Street Fighter III. Still conflicted by the Dark Hadou, Ryu fights a criminal organization while meeting his old rivals. A new appearance of Evil Ryu in a Street Fighter game was confirmed in Super Street Fighter IV: Arcade Edition by a teaser trailer, and he was later confirmed as a secret boss and playable character in leaked video footage. Ryu later appears in Street Fighter V, set between IV and III, where he destroys Bison once and for all with help from Charlie Nash after purging himself of the Satsui no Hado within him using the Power of Nothingness (無の拳, Mu no Ken). However, the evil energy manifested as its own entity, taking the form of an Oni version of Evil Ryu, referring to itself as Kage. Kage attempts to overpower Ryu but fails to shake his convictions and fades from existence. In Street Fighter 6, Ryu mentors an unofficial student, Avatar, sharing his Japan adventures and inspirations. Training the Avatar helps him learn smartphone usage and an offensive technique, with Ryu aiming to pass his knowledge on to future generations.

Ryu has appeared in spin-offs related to the Street Fighter series such as the Street Fighter EX series produced by Arika, Street Fighter Duel, and Street Fighter VR Shadaloo Enhancement Plan. Byron Mann portrays the character in the separately produced arcade and console games based on the American film of the series, both titled Street Fighter: The Movie, where he wears Ryu's characteristic white karate gi and red headband. The 1994 animated movie also inspired a movie where Ryu is featured.

=== In other games ===
Ryu has also been featured in Capcom's inter-company crossovers such as the Marvel vs. Capcom series, the SNK vs. Capcom series, Namco × Capcom, Tatsunoko vs. Capcom, Project X Zone, Project X Zone 2, and The King of Fighters All Star. Some games in the SNK vs. Capcom series also include Evil Ryu as an unlockable character. Ryu is also an unlockable character in Free Fire. In Marvel vs. Capcom: Clash of Super Heroes, Ryu can change his moveset to the ones by Ken or Akuma while fighting. He appears in Super Puzzle Fighter II Turbo, a puzzle video game featuring super deformed characters, the sequel fighting game Super Gem Fighter Mini Mix, and the mobile puzzle game Street Fighter: Puzzle Spirits. Ryu is a playable fighter in the crossover fighting game Street Fighter X Tekken, and is also seen in the Tekken X Street Fighter poster along with Jin Kazama.

Onimusha: Dawn of Dreams features Ryu as an unlockable costume swap for the game's protagonist Soki. Ryu has a cameo in the shooting game Varth: Operation Thunderstorm. He was also to appear in the now-cancelled game Mega Man Universe. A Ryu-inspired costume for players to use in Sony's LittleBigPlanet was released in 2008 as downloadable content for the title. A special downloadable episode in Asura's Wrath allows players to fight both Ryu and Evil Ryu. Ryu also appears as a playable character via downloadable content in the Nintendo crossover fighting games Super Smash Bros. for Nintendo 3DS and Wii U along with a stage based on his arena from Street Fighter II known as Suzaku Castle. Ryu returns in the sequel Super Smash Bros. Ultimate—this time available in the initial release—along with every other returning fighter in the series' history. A spirit of Evil Ryu was also added to the game for the celebration of Street Fighter's 35th anniversary. He appears as a party member for a limited time event in the smartphone RPG, Granblue Fantasy, in a collaboration event titled "Ultra Granblue Fighter". Additionally, he made an appearance in Capcom's mobile card game Teppen. Ryu is also a guest character in Power Rangers: Legacy Wars, appearing both in his traditional form and in an original Power Rangers form called the "Ryu Ranger". This same version of Ryu, now dubbed the "Crimson Hawk Ranger", appears as a playable character in Power Rangers: Battle for the Grid via downloadable content.

A playable Ryu outfit has also been added to Fortnite. A playable Ryu skin was also added to Exoprimal. Ryu was added to Ubisoft's Brawlhalla as a part of the collaboration between Street Fighter and Brawlhalla, along with Chun-Li and Akuma. In addition, Ryu's classic stage, Suzaku Castle, was also included. In 2023, PUBG, a battle royale game, featured Ryu as one of the purchasable skins available from July 26 to September 20. Ryu was added to Minecraft as a skin in the "World Warrior" DLC skin pack, which included 35 other characters from the Street Fighter series. Monster Hunter World included Ryu as a costume; in fact, Ryu can also perform some of his signature moves in the game, such as hadouken and shoryuken. Ryu and Chun-Li were included in Rainbow Six Siege as "Elite skins".

=== In other media ===
==== Live-action ====
Ryu is played by Byron Mann in the 1994 film version of Street Fighter, where he serves as a supporting protagonist, as Guile is the main character. In this depiction, Ryu is given the surname "Hoshi" and is presented as an American of Japanese ethnicity. Ryu and Ken are con artists who steal money from crime lords. They work with Guile to infiltrate M. Bison's headquarters, defeating Vega in battle. Ryu, along with other participants, contributes to Bison's downfall by luring Guile to Bison's base. Despite not appearing in Street Fighter: The Legend of Chun Li, Ryu is mentioned at the end of the movie by a person named Gen. Jon Foo played Ryu in the proof-of-concept film Street Fighter: Legacy , developed by Joey Ansah. Ryu would later appear in Ansah's officially sanctioned prequel series, Street Fighter: Assassin's Fist, portrayed by Mike Moh. Moh reprised his role as Ryu in the five-part mini series Street Fighter: Resurrection. Ryu appears in the 2018 film Ready Player One, based on the book of the same name by Ernest Cline. In the 2018 film Goosebumps 2: Haunted Halloween, Slappy the Dummy uses magic to bring actions figures of Ryu and Ken to life. Peter Jang portrays Ryu in the official crossover between the Power Rangers and Street Fighter titled Power Rangers: Legacy Wars—Street Fighter Showdown. In the short, Ryu morphs into the Ryu Ranger and Chun-Li teams with Tommy Oliver, Ninjor and Gia Moran to battle M. Bison and evil Power Rangers. Ryu appeared in the 2026 reboot portrayed by Andrew Koji. His dark persona Dark Ryu appears.

==== Animation ====
In Street Fighter II: The Animated Movie, Ryu is the central character. After Ryu defeats and scars Sagat in the film's opening, Bison commands a worldwide manhunt for him. Ryu's ability to travel and suppress power makes him untraceable to Bison's monitors. He encounters fighters like Fei-Long and E. Honda, and eventually, Bison brainwashes Ken. Guile and Interpol intercept Ryu, but Bison follows and sets Ken on Ryu. Ken breaks free, and they work together to defeat Bison. He was voiced by Kōjirō Shimizu in the Japanese version and Skip Stellrecht in the English dub.

Ryu also appears in the American TV series. Once again, he is replaced by Guile as the protagonist since it is a continuation of the 1994 live-action film. Near the end of the series, however, the story shifts focus to Ryu and Ken, making them more prominent as they face several enemies such as the Mad Gear gang. In both the film and the series, Ryu's name is incorrectly pronounced "Raiyu"; however, in the movie Guile and Bison are the only ones who pronounce his name correctly. The premise of the 1995 Japanese TV series Street Fighter II V centers on a young Ryu and Ken, who travel the world with Chun-Li to improve their martial art skills by challenging other fighters. He was voiced by Kōji Tsujitani in the Japanese version and again by Skip Stellrecht in the English Animaze dub. In the ADV Films dub he was portrayed by Brett Weaver and later by Tommy Drake.

The 1999 OVA Street Fighter Alpha: The Animation focuses on Ryu's struggle with the Dark Hadou, accompanied by new elements such as Ryu's supposed brother Shun and their conflict with Professor Sadler and Rosanov. Sadler and Bison both seek out powerful fighters to absorb their abilities, particularly Ryu's Dark Hadou. Ryu searches for Shun after he is kidnapped by Rosanov, confronting Akuma in the process. Ryu eventually tracks Sadler down and defeats him with the help of his allies, but Shun dies in the process. Ryu forgives Shun for his actions. The 2005 OVA Street Fighter Alpha: Generations features a similar storyline, but is unrelated to the previous Alpha anime. In 2008, Capcom released a new OVA where Crimson Viper is sent to capture Ryu on orders from Seth, who knows about Ryu's Satsui no Hado and wants it for himself. Ryu fights Seth and remains victorious. Ryu made cameo appearances in the Disney animated film Wreck-It Ralph, with Kyle Hebert reprising his role.

==== Comics ====
Ryu also appears in many printed adaptations of the series. In the manga Street Fighter II by Masaomi Kanzaki, Ryu believes M. Bison murdered both Gouken and Ken and goes on a quest to avenge them. In Street Fighter (Malibu Comics), Ryu and his friendly rivals Ken and Chun-Li were trained by the same master. The beginning of the comics focuses on Ken's current life, in which he has given up fighting and decided to pursue acting as a career. Later on, Ken gets into conflict with villain Balrog and his hood, although Ken manages to fight back but gets stabbed by Sagat. After a while, Ryu discovers Ken's scalp in a box that is covered in blood. The manga Street Fighter: Sakura Ganbaru! by Masahiko Nakahira has Ryu as a central character from the storyline where the title character, Sakura Kasugano, wishes to meet him. Nakahira also wrote and illustrated "Street Fighter III: Ryu Final", which chronicles Ryu's ongoing quest for enlightenment during the Street Fighter III storyline that culminates into a decisive battle against Akuma.

Udon Entertainment's comic book adaptation of the Street Fighter plot follows Ryu, a skilled fighter trained in Ansatsuken. He struggles to resist the dark power of Satsui no Hadō while honing his skills. When he learns of his master's death at the hands of his brother Akuma, Ryu teams up with Ken to seek revenge. Ryu's victory in the Street Fighter tournament attracts the attention of Bison, Chun-Li, and Guile, who suspect criminal ties. Ryu trains with Sakura and other fighters to improve. During a battle with Akuma, Ryu resists the corrupting power of Satsui no Hadō, but Gouken suddenly arrives and finishes the battle with Akuma. Ryu passes out before the fight can conclude, and he is rescued from the sinking island by Dhalsim. Following the battle, Ryu vows to no longer rely on the dark power for victory.

In the Street Fighter Unlimited series, Ryu takes on Sakura as his pupil after graduating. After being kidnapped by Urien and the Society, Sakura is manipulated into succumbing to the Satsui no Hadō. Ryu absorbs the Dark Hado and transforms into Evil Ryu, fighting Akuma in his Oni form. Gill arrives and uses his powers to defeat them. Ryu struggles to maintain the Dark Hado and learns techniques from Gouken. He learns to balance his light and dark ki and participates in Gill's fighting tournament. Ryu transforms into Shin Ryu, defeats Gill, and wins a rematch against Akuma. After defeating Akuma, Ryu returns to Brazil to resume his training with Oro to master his new powers.

== Promotion and reception ==
=== Popularity ===
Ryu is consistently ranked as one of the most popular and memorable characters from the Street Fighter franchise and gaming overall among critics. GameSpot featured him in their article "All Time Greatest Game Hero", while Stone Sam of CBR regarded him as a "video game icon" alongside Chun-Li thanks to their character development since their first appearances. IGN placed Ryu at the top spot in their "Top 25 Street Fighter Characters" article, praising his character design for being simple yet effective, which includes a white gi, dark gloves, and red headband, adding a subtle touch of color, making it uncommon to see many fancy items used to create an "icon". He has also been recognized as one of the best all-time gaming characters. He was voted one of the best video game characters both in a Famitsu issue and in the Guinness World Records Gamer's Edition in 2011. In 2010, Empire ranked him as the 27th greatest video game character, adding, "Cheaters use Sagat, real men use Ryu! The face of the greatest fighting franchise ever to grace a console, Ryu is an icon who has spanned decades. While synonymous with the Street Fighter franchise, he's also gone toe-to-toe with SNK's finest, The Darkstalkers line-up and half of the Marvel stable, only to emerge unscathed and victorious nine bouts out of ten." Ian Walker of Kotaku described Ryu as a Kevin Bacon of video games. Ryu artwork was featured on an officially licensed NubyTech/UDON joypad for the PlayStation 2, announced on September 27, 2004.

=== Critical response ===
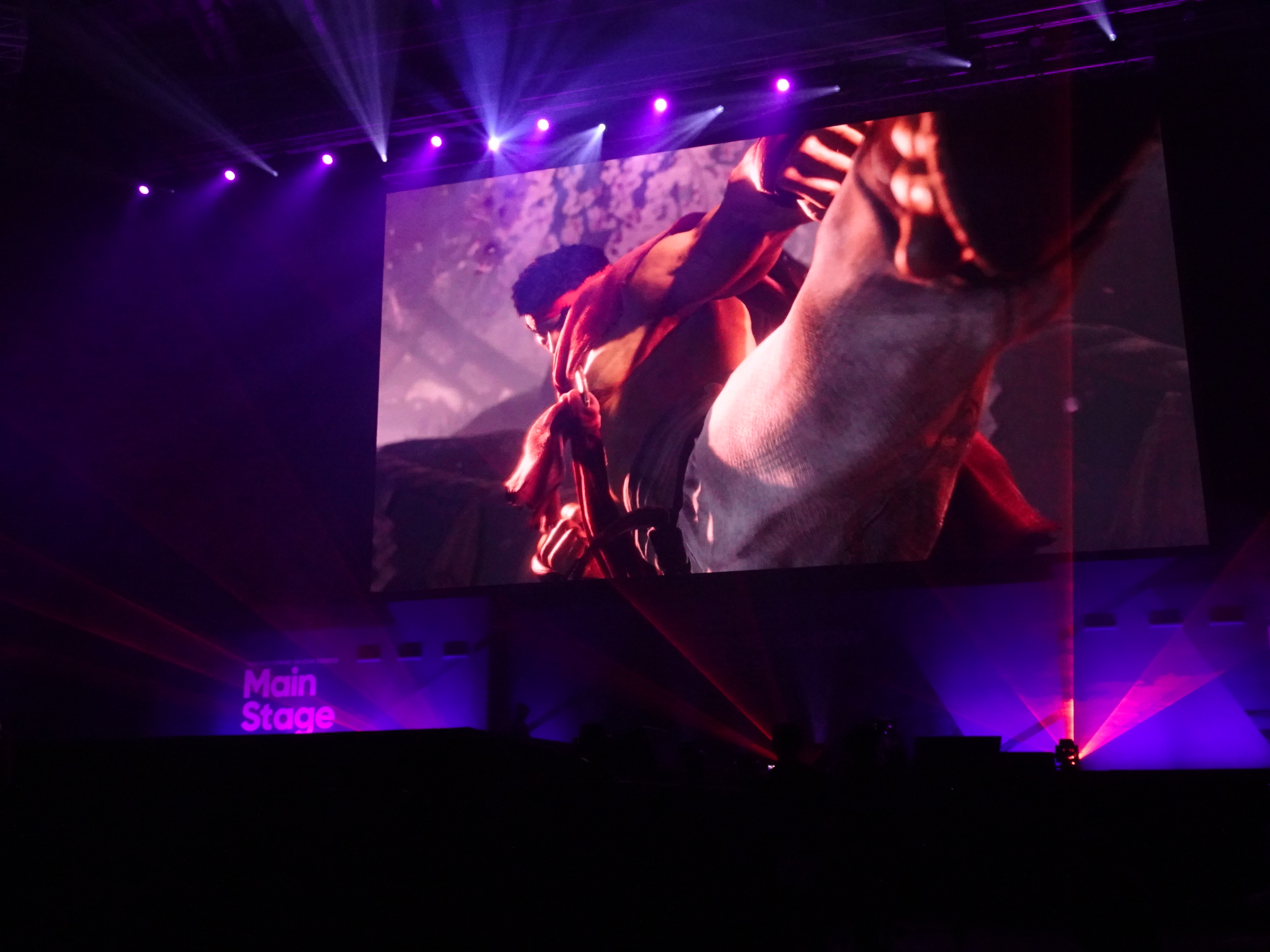
Tokyo Game Show 2023 promotion of Street Fighter 6. The redesign of Ryu in the new installment attracted positive response in social media.

Although in early appearances, Ryu and Ken were nearly identical to the unnamed characters from Karate Champ, Capcom's handling of the character would turn Ryu into a character similar to a protagonist from a Weekly Shōnen Jump manga character such as Son Goku from Akira Toriyama's Dragon Ball, Gon Freecss from Yoshihiro Togashi's Hunter × Hunter, Yoh Asakura from Hiroyuki Takei's Shaman King, Tanjiro Kamado from Koyoharu Gotouge's Demon Slayer: Kimetsu no Yaiba, Naruto Uzumaki from Masashi Kishimoto's Naruto, Izuku Midoriya from Kohei Horikoshi's My Hero Academia, Asta from Yuki Tabata's Black Clover, Yuji Itadori from Gege Akutami's Jujutsu Kaisen, Monkey D. Luffy from Eiichiro Oda's One Piece, or Ichigo Kurosaki from Tite Kubo's Bleach. The Hadoken was also a highly influential move in fighting games as seen in Smash or Naruto games. Adaptations of the franchise would go to further develop the character. Despite being nearly identical in the first Street Fighter game, Ryu gradually develops his own distinct identity as a character in Capcom's various games. This evolution is exemplified by his unique traits, which set him apart from his initial counterpart Ken, who was portrayed as his American equivalent. Additionally, Ryu's character arc is further enriched by the introduction of Akuma, a dark and intense character who serves as a reflection of Ryu's own potential darkness. Ryu and Ken's original moves brought a major impact in fighting games; their use of three signature techniques (the projectile Hadoken, the close uppercut Shoryuken and the advancing tornado kick Tatsumaki Senpukyaku) became a baseline design for many later fighting game characters in Street Fighter and beyond, collectively known as "shotos". In future installments, Ryu and Ken were given new techniques based on real world similar to Andy Hug. The character's popularity and large number of appearances was noted to be effective as Ryu appeared in crossover games having striking rivalries with characters from other games like Tekken's Kazuya Mishima, X-Men's Wolverine, The King of Fighters's Kyo Kusanagi, among others.

GamesRadar writer Tyler Wilde published an article focusing on Ken's and Ryu's development across the franchise under the title "The evolution of Ken and Ryu" which discusses the similarities in their designs and moves as well as what parts of their personalities sets them apart; while Ryu is devoted only to his training, Ken spends his appearances focusing on his love life and eventual family. The Guardian recommended Ryu and Ken for beginners in Street Fighter IV. Ryu was deemed better at fights from distances because of his projectiles moves. In GameSpot's "Great Loves" article Ryu was described as "one of the most independent men in the world of video games" as he is interested only in training to become a stronger fighter in contrast to other Street Fighter characters who have romantic interests. Henry Gilbert wrote in a 2009 GamesRadar article that Ryu was "the heart and soul of the Street Fighter series" and "probably the most well known fighting game character in the world". Lucas Sullivan of GamesRadar described him as the perfect representation of fighting game characters due to his constant desire to push his limits and face tougher rivals. They also noted his humble, calm, and modest nature, mentioning that Ryu possesses the abilities of throwing plasma-like fireballs from his hands, performing continuous spin kicks in mid-air, and launching someone with an uppercut while remaining humble and avoiding conflicts with those weaker than him. Den of Geek argued the character is appealing because of his wish to engage strong enemies and his growth since the Alpha series, most notably in Masahiko Nakahira's manga centered on Ryu which shows the character's appeal.

Evil Ryu was noted to be a trope of protagonist gaming characters who reveal an evil alter-ego. Evil Ryu, shown in Super Street Fighter IV: Arcade Edition, was noted to share traits from both Ryu and Akuma. GameSpot said that since he uses modified versions from known techniques, he was one of the least interesting additions to the game. The stronger damage he can inflict has been commented on by Game Informer, which mentioned he was even stronger than Seth, the Street Fighter IV boss. In a GamesRadar article by Michael Grimm, a fight between Evil Ryu and Devil Jin was described as one players wanted to see in Street Fighter X Tekken as the two are evil alter egos from two existing characters sharing similar designs and movesets with their original forms. The website Den of Geek also praised such form for giving the origins of Ryu a major twist and having a major part in the narrative as Akuma is interested in the protagonist reaching this form. On the other hand, Destructoid criticized the handling of Ryu in the story mode of Street Fighter V for having actions that do not make much sense. Eurogamer also criticized the expansion of Ryu's character in the form of Kage which repeats the subplot of the hero trying to battle his inner darkness. Kage faced criticism for his design and moveset being perceived as recycled from Evil Ryu. The similarities between the two characters, including their appearance and fighting style, led to accusations of lack of originality in Kage's creation.

With the release of Street Fighter 6, there was much focus around Ryu's new design polished by Capcom's visual engine. Kotaku noted his primitive classic design as Ryu never covered his feet until the latest game, even though he suggested that he could afford them in previous games he suggested. Polygon found the large built of Ryu in the trailer to be ridiculous at first glance, pointing at the size of his shoulders and that his head looks small in comparison. This led to joke about his built in social media, giving parallels to other characters like Chris Redfield from Resident Evil among others. GamesRadar said the design was notable among the fandom for his sex appeal as tweeted in social media. This went as far as people claiming they could see the character's crotch region upon his body reveal as the design of Street Fighter 6 was highly detailed to the point of showing more Ryu's facial hair as an example of detail given. leading to fan nicknames like "Hot Ryu" or "Dad Ryu". This eventually became an internet meme with PCGamer joking about his long competition with Ken Masters' appeal. Briana Lawrence of The Mary Sue said that she was leaning on Ryu's screencap on Street Fighter 6 trailer being more unintentional moment than Lady Dimitrescu, a character from the horror game Resident Evil: Village notable for her sex appeal. The character was also praised for exploring his own social life to the player's avatar when training, such as the way he gets along with fellow fighters Ken or Chun-Li. Kotaku also recommended players to listen to Ryu's new musical themes accompanied with vocals taken from a "Jet Set Radio" that will atrract several people.

=== Cultural impact ===
After the release of the game some members of the original Street Fighter video game development team at Capcom moved to SNK. Ryu's original designer, Takashi Nishiyama, revealed that Art of Fighting's Ryo Sakazaki was created as an homage to the original Ryu. Meanwhile, Fatal Fury's Terry Bogard originated from one of Ryu's fellow characters meant as Fatal Fury: King of Fighters was meant to compete with Street Fighter II. This is further explored in the crossover games SNK developed with the Capcom franchises where Ryu often interacts with Ryo. While in charge of developing the character Kyo Kusanagi from The King of Fighters, Yuichiro Hiraki under Nishiyama's support carefully considered how to differentiate Kyo from Ryu. Hiraki understood the importance of creating a character with a unique personality and design in order to stand out and appeal to players on a similar level. Ryu served as the primary inspiration for the creation of the character Gouki. The game designers were particularly drawn to Ryu's design and fighting style, which they wanted to incorporate into the character of Akuma. This decision was made in contrast to the other villain of "Street Fighter II", M. Bison, as the designers felt that Akuma's design should be more closely aligned with Ryu's. As a result, Gouki was developed to embody the essence of Ryu's character. Sheng Long appears as a non-playable character in the "World Tour" mode of Street Fighter 6 whom players fight atop the SiRN building at night after completing the game. Using Ryu's fighting style, he has been described as one of the mode's hardest opponents. Originally, the protagonist of the 1999 action adventure game Shenmue, Ryo Hazuki, was going to imitate Ryu's Shin Shoryuken in combat, but director Yu Suzuki removed it from the game, leading to former Sega developers leaking the content years later. When Tamsoft was initially development their fighting game Battle Arena Toshinden, when first developing the cast director Shintarō Nakaoka started with a basic concept taking inspiration from the duality of Ryu and Ken Masters.

In 1993, Hong Kong artist Situ Jianqian based characters in his comic Supergod Z: Cyber Weapon on Ryu, Ken, and Chun-li. However, due to a warning from Capcom, he ultimately decided to rename the characters. Despite this setback, Situ Jianqian's comic still drew inspiration from these characters. It is interesting to note that Ryu, in particular, was considered one of the most popular Japanese gaming characters at the time. Benjamin Wai-ming Ng from the University of Hong Kong further added that while characters like Ryu, Ken, and Chun-li may have been popular in Japan and other parts of the world, in China, they were overshadowed by the main characters from SNK's The King of Fighters series. In a scientific study conducted in 2019, researchers reached a conclusion regarding the physical requirements for Ryu to successfully execute one of his signature moves, the Tatsumaki Senpukyaku. According to their findings, it was determined that Ryu would need to achieve a speed of nearly 70 miles per hour (equivalent to 110 kilometers per hour) while moving through the air in order to perform the Tatsumaki Senpukyaku.
