= Jay Tavare =

American actor and blogger

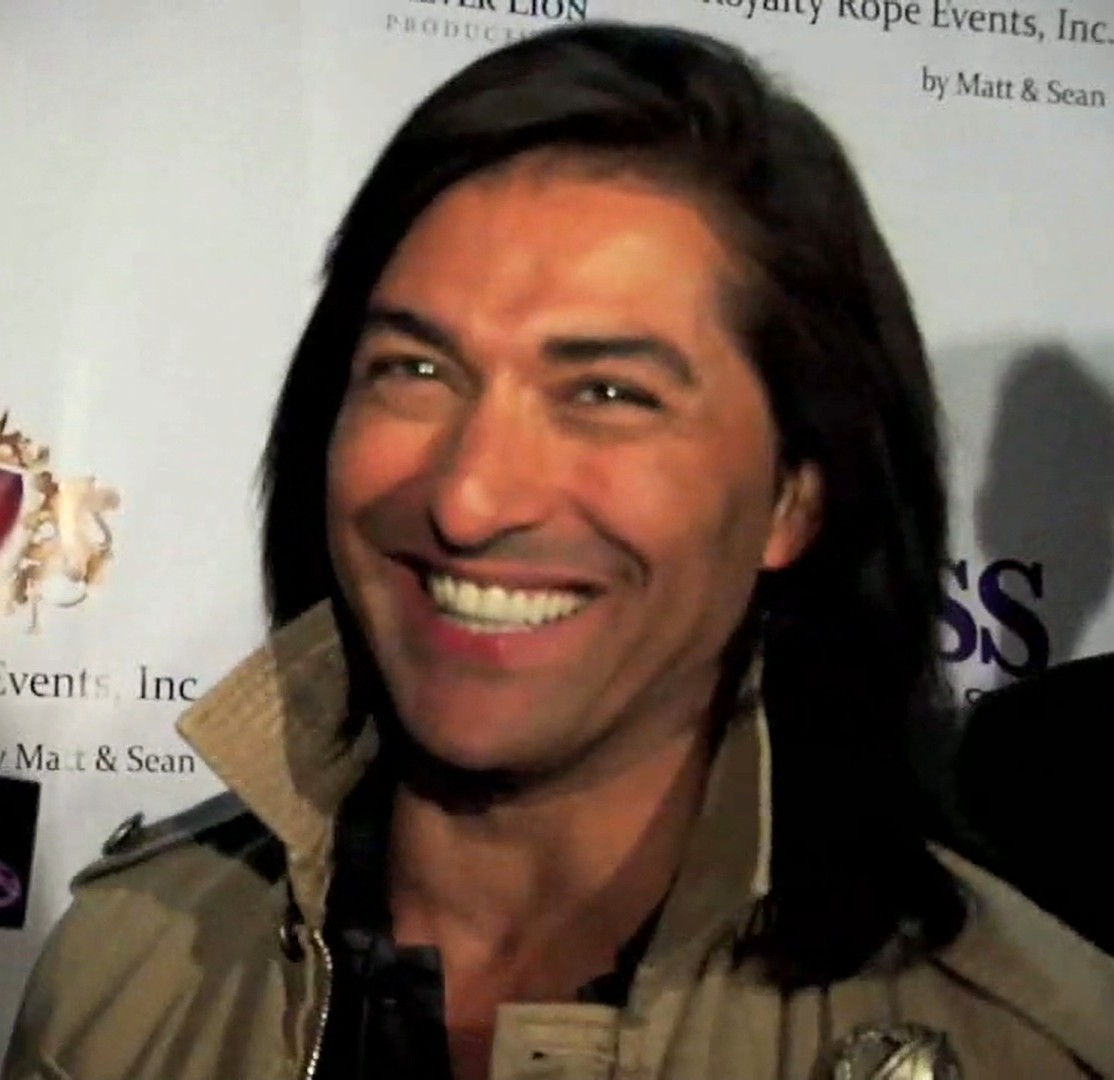
Tavare in 2009

Jay Tavare /ˈtævreɪ/ is an American actor. He is known for portraying Vega in the 1994 film adaptation of the video game Street Fighter, and its video game tie-in.

== Filmography ==
=== Film ===
Year	Title	Role	Notes
1994	Street Fighter	Vega	
1996	Executive Decision	Nabill	
1999	Unbowed	Waka Mani	
2000	Escape to Grizzly Mountain	Tukayoo	
2002	Adaptation	Matthew Osceola	
2003	The Missing	Kayitah	
2003	Cold Mountain	Swimmer	
2003	El Padrino	Special Agent Sanchez	
2007	Pathfinder	Black Wing	
2008	Turok: Son of Stone	Koba	Voice, direct-to-video
2011	Vatos Locos	Jimmy Cavera	Direct-to-video
2014	Off Track	Pui	Short
2015	The Human Centipede 3 (Final Sequence)	Inmate 346	
2015	Bone Tomahawk	Sharp Teeth	
2015	The Revenant		Uncredited
2015	The Fifth Sum	Moctezuma	

=== Television ===
Year	Title	Role	Notes
2005	Into the West	Chief Prairie Fire	Episode: "Manifest Destiny"
2008	CSI: Miami	Manny Ortega	Episode: "Going Ballistic"
2012	Longmire	Reuben Lamebull	Episode: "Dogs, Horses and Indians"
2021	Masters of the Universe: Revelation	Wundar (voice)	Episode: "The Most Dangerous Man in Eternia"

=== Video games ===
Year	Title	Role	Notes
1995	Street Fighter: The Movie	Vega	Console
1995	Street Fighter: The Movie	Vega	Arcade
2005	Gun	Stone Hand / Native American 2	
2009	Call of Juarez: Bound in Blood	Running River	
2010	Red Dead Redemption	Pedestrian / Background Character	
2015	Metal Gear Solid V: The Phantom Pain	Code Talker	
2024	Batman: Arkham Shadow	CO Martinez	
