= Dee Jay =

Street Fighter character

- Street Fighter character
- Dee Jay in Super Street Fighter II
- First appearance: Super Street Fighter II (1993)
- Designed by: James Goddard
- Portrayed by: Miguel A. Núñez Jr.
- Voiced by: English: Beau Billingslea (Street Fighter II: The Animated Movie); Paul Dobson (animated series); Chris Cain (Super Street Fighter IV); Zeno Robinson (Street Fighter 6); Japanese: Japanese; Ginzō Matsuo (Street Fighter II: The Animated Movie); Hōchū Ōtsuka (Street Fighter Alpha 3); Kenji Hamada (Super Street Fighter IV, Street Fighter 6)

In-universe information
- Fighting style: Kickboxing; Karateka
- Origin: Jamaica
- Nationality: Jamaican

Dee Jay (Japanese: ディージェイ, Hepburn: Dī Jei) is a fictional character in the Street Fighter series. He made his first appearance in the 1993's Super Street Fighter II as one of the four new characters introduced in the game. In the series, he is a Jamaican kickboxer and karateka, as well as a recording artist and breakdancer. He was the only character at the time to be designed by an American. Dee Jay was based on real-life kickboxer Billy Blanks and has received mixed critical reception.

== Conception design ==
Dee Jay was conceived for Super Street Fighter II by American designer James Goddard, and his name was chosen as a variant on Goddard's nickname, DJames. He was the first Street Fighter character to be designed by an American, and only one of only three characters in the series to have been conceived by an American, along with Blade and Captain Sawada. While Super Street Fighter II was going to feature Cammy, T. Hawk, and two brothers who had the same design save for a head swap, Goddard felt that it would be redundant to have another pair of characters with the same fighting style. As a result, Capcom added Dee Jay in place of one of the brothers, while the other evolved into Fei Long.

The character concept came from interpreting kickboxer Billy Blanks from his role in The King of the Kickboxers, but with a more cheerful disposition. Goddard suggested Blanks as an inspiration when the Japanese team asked for more design ideas. Goddard commented that "a really kick-ass black character would be awesome, instead of someone who was more negative, which is what you tended to see from the Japanese back in those days." In spite of the fact that Blanks is a bad guy in the film which he saw him in, The King of the Kickboxers, he states "his build and look, I just thought that it would make a great character—high-flying, crazy kicks... I mean, you have to remember, this was Billy Blanks pre-'Tae Bo.' He was so bad-ass."

Goddard began designing Dee Jay by drawing a sketch of him and sending it to the Japanese team. He sent the film The King of the Kickboxers by copying a VHS tape and sending it through FedEx. He designed him as a "positive, fun character," implementing elements such as him being Jamaican, a "fun-loving guy," and a person who is trying to "jump-start his music career while kicking a lot of ass." While the design on his pants originally said "MANTIS," but was changed to say "MAXIMUM." This was because his sprite facing left was a mirror image of his sprite facing right, and the N and S in "MANTIS" would be reversed on the left sprite. According to Goddard, "we decided that Mantis wasn't going to work down the side of his pants, so we opted for Maximum." Soon after, Dee Jay was adapted into the 1994 Street Fighter film, played by Miguel A. Núñez Jr. with his musical background replaced by computer skills. As one of the only characters to be created by an American designer, Street Fighter co-creator Akira Nishitani commented that he only learned the story behind the character's creation decades after.

== Appearances ==
Dee Jay made his debut in Super Street Fighter II (1993) as one of the four new characters introduced in the game in addition to the original twelve character roster from previous Street Fighter II games. He enters the World Warrior tournament, seeking inspiration to develop a new musical sound. Dee Jay reappears as a playable character in the console versions of Street Fighter Alpha 3 (1998) and in the console version of Street Fighter: The Movie. The game is set before the World Warrior tournament and depicts Dee Jay before he began his professional music career. While he was not included in Street Fighter IV, development of his character for its sequel, Super Street Fighter IV, had commenced during the former game's development. Audio files of the announcer from Street Fighter IV announcing Dee Jay were found amongst the game's audio files. He was revealed along with T. Hawk, who also originated from Super Street Fighter II, and Juri, a character created for Street Fighter IV. In Super Street Fighter II, Dee Jay has a manager named Rick, while in Street Fighter Alpha 3 he has an agent named Bob. Dee Jay returns in Street Fighter 6, where he is now successful musician and part-time actor, as well as being a fan of Manon Legrand and befriend with a fellow music loving fighter, Kimberly Jackson who helped him find a new song.

One of the trailers of Street Fighter X Tekken showed parts of Dee Jay that resembles him. However he did not make it to the final roster. Instead, his appearance served as a swap costume for Hwoarang.

=== In other media ===
Dee Jay plays a minor role in Street Fighter II: The Animated Movie. Here, he beats up a few punks causing trouble at a nightclub before being warned by Guile and Chun-Li that he is being monitored by Shadaloo, which he does not believe until Chun-Li destroys one of their cyborgs in front of him. He was voiced by Ginzo Matsuo in Japanese and Beau Billingslea (credited as John Hammond) in English.

In the 1994 live-action film version of Street Fighter, Dee Jay was portrayed by Miguel A. Núñez, Jr. as one of the primary antagonists. He is depicted as a greedy hacker and engineer working for General M. Bison. In the film's climax, Dee Jay flees from Bison's base with a trunk of Bison's money instead of staying to fight, only to find it full of useless "Bison Dollars" that Bison had planned to issue as currency once he took over the world. He is also seen telling Zangief that Bison is the true enemy and had been using them both since his rise to crime power (though he had paid Dee Jay well while paying Zangief nothing). This version of Dee Jay appears in the console version of the Street Fighter: The Movie video game, and serves as the second of the four Grand Masters in the Street Battle mode (along with Zangief, Sagat and Bison).

UDON's line of Street Fighter comics gives Dee Jay a minor role as a brainwashed agent of Shadaloo who breaks into MI5's Delta Red headquarters (along with other Doll agents) and frees a captured Doll agent from their custody. He is captured during the raid and his mind is restored with the help of Delta Red.

== Reception ==
Dee Jay has received mixed reception. Rocky Mountain News described Dee Jay as "a flashy rapper-type, and probably the best of the new four" characters introduced in Super Street Fighter II. Professional Street Fighter player Keith Stuart listed him as his second favourite Street Fighter character and praised his Super Street Fighter II Turbo incarnation, while also praising him for being "a really positive, happy character." IGN UK editor Martin Robinson, in discussing the Dee Jay, T. Hawk, and Juri, stated that "all three of which we've played and all three of which we're already in love with." In discussing Super Street Fighter II, Giant Bomb editor Jeff Gerstmann commented that "I did my best to basically pretend he didn't exist," stating that the "real stars" of the game were Fei-Long and Cammy.

IGN editor Jesse Schedeen criticized his inclusion in the 1994 film, stating that he "seemed included merely for comic relief." However, Games World praised the film for casting Miguel A. Núñez Jr., and also the alterations to his character, adding "going from DJ to computer whizz isn't a bad career move at all". Gavin Jasper of Den of Geek also noted a preference for the direction the film took the character, stating in regards to his in-game storyline "Dee Jay is all about rhythm and that's about it. Despite being a guy based on dancing, he's still somehow the most boring guy."

Dee Jay has been examined as a representation of black characters in games. Eurogamer notes that Dee Jay was one of the few black video game characters in the early 1990s, saying "the representation of black characters in the '90s seemed to get worse, with odd creative choices by developers and straight up laughable attempts at diversity, including a personal favourite, Dee Jay." Journalist and game critic Evan Narcisse notes Dee Jay as one of the few black characters in games from this period, as part of "a whole parade of hot-tempered brawn-centric bruisers and slangtastic slicksters have appeared in fighting game series ... all clearly meant to convey a 'hip' urban lifestyle in the broadest of strokes." Bitmob editor Brian Shirk mentions Dee Jay among Street Fighter's "most offensive stereotypes" reserved for poorer nations that had been colonized, commenting that his appearance "brings to mind the word "savage" that was typical of depictions of black people in early film. Paste described him as "one of the most reviled characters in the series' whole canon. He's among the least sensitive stereotypes in the Street Fighter II cast", and felt it was a sign of where things were going too far with re-releases. However, they later added that due to the lack of usage and limited number of black characters in the series, they'd become more fond of him and ended with "I'll take what I can get."
