= Kenya Sawada =

Japanese film actor (born 1965)

- Born: January 28, 1965 (age 61); Kanagawa, Japan
- Citizenship: Hong Kong
- Occupation: Actor

Kenya Sawada (澤田 拳也, Sawada Ken'ya; born January 28, 1965) is a Japanese-born film actor who has appeared in numerous movies, primarily in Hong Kong productions. He has occasionally been credited simply by his first name.

Sawada was born in Kanagawa, Japan. His first appearance was in a Japanese film Hey Oilers: The Legend of Skyline. Sawada's only other Japanese productions include Buyûden and Hasami as well as the 1998 Hong Kong-Japanese production B gai waak. Instead, Sawada has appeared more prominently in numerous Hong Kong productions, beginning with a minor role in the 1995 Jackie Chan film Thunderbolt. He also appeared in the 2009 Jackie Chan film Shinjuku Incident.

He played Captain Sawada in the Stephen de Souza-directed Street Fighter film, based on the fighting game series by the same name. Sawada appeared as part of a promotional deal with Capcom. Initially, Capcom intended Sawada to play Ryu in the film, however, his poor knowledge of English at the time made the casting difficult.

Like most of the cast he also did the screen-capture for the video-game rendition based on the movie, Street Fighter: The Movie. Sawada has also been involved in the Street Fighter II: The Animated Movie as a script coordinator and has a writing credit for the Street Fighter II V anime series.

== Filmography ==
=== Film ===
Year	Title	Role	Notes
1990	Jipangu	Tobatsu	
1991	Hey Oilers: The Legend of Skyline	Hanayama	Direct-to-video
1994	Street Fighter	Captain Sawada	
1995	Thunderbolt	"Saw"	
1996	Somebody Up There Likes Me	Yamada Motokazu	
1998	B gai waak	Detective Takami	
2000	Devils on the Doorstep (Guizi lai lee)	Inokichi Sakatsuka	
2001	Ye long	Ryuya Tanaka	
2003	Buyûden	Azuma Goro	
2009	Shinjuku Incident (San suk si gin)	Nakajima Hiromasa	
2010	Yip Man chin chyun	Kitano Yukio	
2011	The Great Magician	Mitearai	
2012	Hasami	Ken'ya	
2018	Hidden Man	Nemoto Ichiro	
2018	Huang Fei Hong: Nu hai xiong feng	Hattori Ichiro	

=== Television ===
Year	Title	Role	Notes
1992	Tokugawa Buraichō		Ep. 8
1993	Itoshi no Deka	Attack group member	Ep. 19

=== Video games ===
Year	Title	Role	Notes
1995	Street Fighter: The Movie (arcade version)	Captain Sawada	
1995	Street Fighter: The Movie (console version)	Captain Sawada	
