= Thunderbolt (1995 film) =

1995 Hong Kong film by Gordon Chan

- Film poster

Chinese name
- Traditional Chinese: 霹靂火
- Simplified Chinese: 霹雳火
Transcriptions
Standard Mandarin
- Hanyu Pinyin: Pīlì huǒ
Yue: Cantonese
- Jyutping: Pik1 Lik1 Fo2
- Directed by: Gordon Chan
- Written by: Gordon Chan; Chan Hing-Kai; Philip Kwok
- Produced by: Lam Chua
- Starring: Jackie Chan; Anita Yuen; Michael Wong; Thorsten Nickel
- Cinematography: Chan Kwong-hung; Cheng Siu-Keung; Kwan Chi-kan; Ardy Lam; Lam Hung Chuen; Wong Wing-hung
- Edited by: Chan Ki-hop; Cheung Ka-Fai; Peter Cheung; Ng Wang Hung
- Music by: Yang Bang Ean
- Distributed by: Golden Harvest
- Release date: 1 September 1995
- Running time: 110 minutes
- Country: Hong Kong
- Languages: Cantonese; English; Japanese
- Budget: HK$30 million (US$3.9 million)
- Box office: US$17 million (est.)

Thunderbolt (Chinese: 霹靂火) (Piklik Foh) is a 1995 Hong Kong action sports film starring Jackie Chan and directed by Gordon Chan. The action directors were Chan and Sammo Hung, and the action scenes were performed by the Jackie Chan Stunt Team. In early North American releases, the film was known as Dead Heat.

Thunderbolt is set around the world of auto racing. The film is multilingual; characters speak Cantonese, English and Japanese interchangeably.

== Plot ==
Chan Foh To is a junkyard mechanic and a part-time race car driver who helps the Hong Kong Police Force in their crackdown on illegal street racing in the country. One night, while helping news reporter Amy Yip and Mr. Lam after their Mitsubishi FTO runs out of gasoline, Chan commandeers the car with Amy inside to chase after a speeding black Nissan Skyline GT-R R32 driven by the dangerous criminal driver Warner "Cougar" Kaugman. In the high speed car chase's climax, Chan traps Cougar in a police roadblock and has him apprehended. However, due to a lack of evidence and a warrant for arrest, Cougar is immediately released from police custody. Chan continues to be harassed by Amy, who wants to do a cover story of him.

After Chan fends off against Cougar's thugs at his junkyard, Cougar is once again arrested when Chan provides a false testimony under the guidance of Interpol agent Steve Cannon. However, Cougar's thugs raid the police station and spring him out of jail. The thugs kill all except Cannon and another police officer. Cannon and the officer manage kill a few henchmen, with Cannon killing Cougar's girlfriend in the process before Cougar's gang escapes. Cougar then destroys the junkyard and injures Chan's father Chun Tung before taking his younger sisters Dai Mui and Sai Mui hostage to force Chan to race him in Japan.

Chan and his racing team build him a yellow Mitsubishi Lancer Evolution III race car and prepare for his upcoming race, receiving permission from the police to drive it on the expressway. They arrive in Japan, where Chan storms into and destroys a pachinko hall owned by a yakuza gang before Cougar allows Dai Mui to reunite with her brother. Chan makes the starting grid at Sendai Hi-Land Raceway, but his car is destroyed in a collision. Feeling sympathy for Chan, Miss Kenya, the daughter of a Mitsubishi Motors executive, supplies him with two brand-new white Mitsubishi GTO race cars and a supply of Advan tires for the race.

Chan starts at the back of the field, but muscles his way toward the front, despite a 30-second pit penalty and other distractions caused by Amy, but facilitated by the high number of retiring racers. He approaches and battles Cougar for the lead. During the final lap, both cars slide off the track into the gravel pit, facing each other as they struggle to get back on the road. Cougar gets out first, but Chan floors it in reverse before both cars cross the line in a photo finish. Chan wins the race during the spin back forward when his front end touches the finish line first. Cougar attempts to flee from the police, but Chan chases him around the circuit before sending him crashing violently off the track. Chan pulls Cougar out of the burning wreckage for the police to arrest him, and Cannon reveals that he and his team rescued Sai Mui. He then reconciles with Amy and kisses her.

== Cast ==
- Jackie Chan as Chan Foh To/Feng Jim/(Alfred Tung in the American version)
- Anita Yuen as Amy Yip / (Amy Ip in the American version)
- Michael Wong as Steve Cannon
- Thorsten Nickel as Warner "Cougar" Krugman
- Rebecca Penrose as Cougar's Girlfriend
- Chor Yuen as Uncle Chan Chun Tung, Foh's father (Alfred's father in the American version) (as Chor Yun)
- Wu Oi-Yan as Dai Mui (Daphne in American version) (as Daisy Wu Oi-Yan)
- Annie Man as Sai Mui/Xiao Wei (Sammi in the American version) (as Man Chung-Han)
- Yūzō Kayama as Coach Murakami
- Kenya Sawada as Saw
- Ken Lo as Kong (as Low Houi Kang)
- Dayo Wong as Mr. Lam (as Wong Tze-Wah)
- Chin Kar-lok as Mirakami's assistant (Ka Lok Chin in the American version) (Chin Ka-Lok in the German version)
- Corey Yuen as The Doctor (Corey Yen in the American version) (Cory Yuen in the German version)
- Marie Eguro as Miss Kenya
- Yung Kam-Cheong as Mechanic Cheong (as Peter Yung Kam-Cheong)
- William Tuen as Koo/Ku/Saw's thug
- Bruce Law as Bruce (as Bruce Law Lai Yin)
- Patrick Han as John
- Joseph Cheung as Traffic Officer Joe
- Lam Wai-Kong as Inspector Cheung (Joe in the American version)

== Production ==
Filming took place on several race track locations, including Japan's Sendai Hi-Land Raceway and the Batu Tiga Circuit in Shah Alam, Malaysia. Variety estimated the budget at almost HK$30 million (US$3.9 million).

== Reception ==
=== Box office ===
In Hong Kong, Thunderbolt grossed HK$46 million during its theatrical run, equivalent to US$6 million. It premiered during a slump in Hong Kong cinema and, according to Variety, it and Rumble in the Bronx were "more than one-sixth of the combined gross of Hong Kong movies through the end of August."

Overseas, the film grossed NT$3,115,000 (US$1,402,000) in Taiwan. In China, the film grossed CN¥4 million in Beijing and earned CN¥25 million (US$2,994,000) in distributor rentals across the country. In Japan, the film grossed ¥334 million (US$3.55 million). In South Korea, it sold 521,121 tickets and grossed US$2.81 million. In Spain (released 2000), it sold 61,418 tickets, equivalent to an estimated €245,672 (US$226,903). Combined, the film grossed an estimated US$16,982,903 in Asia and Europe.

=== Critical reception ===
Derek Elley of Variety called it light on plot but full of memorable stunts. In a review for the Hong Kong Film Critics Society, Stephen Teo remarked that Thunderbolt was one of Chan's best films because "it pursues the action aesthetic all the way, never pausing long enough for dramatic frills" like some of the star's other works.

=== Accolades ===
- 1995 Golden Horse Film Festival
  - Winner: Best Action Choreography (Corey Yuen)
- 1996 Hong Kong Film Awards
  - Nomination: Best Action Choreography

=== Television ===
In the United Kingdom, the film was watched by 1 million viewers on television in 2004, making it the year's ninth most-watched foreign-language film on television (below eight other Hong Kong action films).
