= Captain Sawada =

Street Fighter film character

Kenzo Sawada
- Street Fighter character
- Captain Sawada in Street Fighter V
- First appearance: Street Fighter: The Movie (1994)
- First game: Street Fighter: The Movie (arcade game) (1995)
- Created by: Steven E. de Souza
- Based on: Kenya Sawada
- Portrayed by: Kenya Sawada
- Voiced by: Michael Dobson (TV series)

In-universe information
- Fighting style: List: Muay Thai; Shorinji Kempo; Ninjutsu; Sawada-ryu kenkajutsu
- Origin: Japan
- Nationality: Japanese

Kenzo Sawada, commonly known as Captain Sawada, is a character in the 1994 film Street Fighter. Portrayed by Kenya Sawada, he came about due to Kenya originally being cast as Ryu through Capcom's wishes, but was recast by writer-director Steven E. de Souza as an original character called Captain Sawada, created to give him a role. He lost the role due to De Souza wanting an actor who had a better grasp of English.

Captain Sawada later appears as a playable character in both the arcade game adaptation and console game adaptation, both in 1995. He uses Muay Thai, as well as techniques based on harakiri and kamikaze. The game has come to be known as the "Sawada Game" due to his involvement. His techniques, particularly the harakiri technique, contributed to him becoming a cult favorite among fans. He has also been compared to the character Fei-Long from Street Fighter II, suggested to have replaced the character in the film. In 2018, Captain Sawada ranked 43rd in out of 93 characters in Capcom's official Street Fighter popularity poll, and in 2024 he placed 54th out of 93 characters in the Street Fighter 6 Battle Hub 'Street Voter' poll.

== Concept and creation ==
Captain Sawada is a Japanese man who works as a member of the Allied Nations against the organization Shadaloo. He uses aspects of multiple fighting styles, including Muay Thai, Shorinji Kempo, Ninjitsu, and Sawada-ryu kenkajutsu. He is portrayed in the 1994 film Street Fighter by Kenya Sawada, who envisioned the character like a samurai, with strengths including being powerful, humble, honest, and faithful. Kenya stated that he came to Los Angeles after hearing that a movie based on Street Fighter II was in the works, eventually contacting the casting director Mary Joe Slater through trial and error. He added that Slater introduced him to producer Edward Pressman and writer-director Steven E. de Souza, emphasizing his physique and action to make up for his lack of English skills. Kenya was considered a "safe, familiar choice" by Capcom according to De Souza, and was originally slated to play the role of Ryu, having portrayed a character similar to Ryu in commercials. De Souza wanted to cast Chinese-American actor Byron Mann, and De Souza chose to not cast Sawada as he wanted someone who had comic timing and better English skills.

According to Kenya, his physical abilities helped Pressman take notice of him. In order to keep Kenya in the cast, De Souza and Capcom invented Captain Sawada, as no one in Street Fighter II fit what Capcom wanted out of him, which De Souza said was "essentially another Ryu." Because of Sawada's relatively lacking English skills, he was the only character dubbed into English for the US release. The character was named Sawada due to a combination of it being Kenya's name and it being easy to pronounce "for all the world." De Souza recounted that Sawada "stared daggers" at him. According to an Inside Games writer, Kenya ad-libbed in the role, though they stated that this was a rumor.

He is voiced by Michael Dobson in the Street Fighter TV series.

== Appearances ==
Captain Sawada first appeared in the Street Fighter film. He is an associate of Guile. He says relatively little, and serves a minor role in the film. He leads a small number of troops in laying siege to villain M. Bison's fortress. He later appeared in two video game adaptations of the Street Fighter film, one on arcades and one on consoles. While most of the cast originates from the Street Fighter video games, Captain Sawada is one of a handful of characters from the movie. He uses techniques based on Japanese concepts, like harakiri and kamikaze, a katana-based attack, and a modified version of Guile's flash kick technique. He also appears in the animated TV series the manga adaptation by Sakayuki Sakai and Street Fighter Brazilian comics.

During the development of SNK vs. Capcom Card Fighters DS, the game's artist, Falcoon, made his first request for a character to be included was Captain Sawada, but it did not pan out due to copyright issues. Sawada appears in the video game Mainichi Issho, where he provides an introductory lesson to self-defense techniques. He also appeared as a character in the puzzle game Neco Drop 2 in 2021, the first time he had appeared alongside other Street Fighter characters since appearing in the console adaptation of the Street Fighter movie. In Neco Drop 2, a cat based on Sawada is featured.

== Reception ==
Captain Sawada has been received well by fans and critics, ranked among the top 50 Street Fighter characters in an official poll. His popularity among fans of the game have led to the game being nicknamed as the "Sawada Game." Due to his appearance in Neco Drop 2, speculation occurred as to whether he would return in a Street Fighter game. He has been compared to the character Fei-Long by Destructoid writer Zoey Handley and Retro Gamer writer Nick Thorpe, the latter believing he replaced him in the film. Despite this, Thorpe stated that the two did not play alike at all.

Captain Sawada was identified as one of the most unusual fighting game characters by Automaton Media writer Naohiko Misuno, noting that he has developed a cult following. Misuno noted that multiple standout qualities, including his personality and his move where he commits harakiri to damage the opponent with his blood. 4gamer writer Yoshida noted that his harakiri move contributed to the cult success of the video game adaptation of the film, stating that Sawada was loved by fighting game fans. He identified himself as a fan of both the character and his actor, appreciating his appearance in Mainichi Issho. Excite writer Kukanshakyo felt that he had an overwhelming presence in the game, owing to his harakiri technique, as well as his kamikaze technique. IT Media writer Gameman found Sawada to be a strong character in the game, noting that despite having multiple interesting attacks, the harakiri attack stands out. Retro Gamer writer Nick Thorpe felt that the move was both offensive and stupid, appreciating that Sawada never appeared in another Street Fighter game and that the actor had a successful career after the film. He believed that his addition was "Hollywood politics."
