= Street Fighter (1994 film) =

Martial arts film by Steven E. de Souza

- Theatrical release poster
- Directed by: Steven E. de Souza
- Written by: Steven E. de Souza
- Based on: Street Fighter II by Capcom
- Produced by: Edward R. Pressman; Kenzo Tsujimoto
- Starring: Jean-Claude Van Damme; Raul Julia; Ming-Na Wen; Damian Chapa; Kylie Minogue; Wes Studi
- Cinematography: William A. Fraker
- Edited by: Edward M. Abroms; Anthony Redman; Robert F. Shugrue; Donn Aron
- Music by: Graeme Revell
- Production companies: Edward R. Pressman Productions; Capcom Co. Ltd.
- Distributed by: Universal Pictures (United States and Canada); Columbia Pictures (through Columbia TriStar Film Distributors International; International)
- Release dates: December 23, 1994 (United States); May 6, 1995 (Japan)
- Running time: 102 minutes
- Countries: United States; Japan
- Language: English
- Budget: $35 million
- Box office: $99.4 million

Street Fighter (Note: fully titled as Street Fighter: The Ultimate Battle, and sometimes referred to as Street Fighter: The Movie) is a 1994 martial arts action film based on the video game series developed and published by Capcom. It was one of two films released in 1994 specifically adapting Street Fighter II, following Street Fighter II: The Animated Movie. Written and directed by Steven E. de Souza, the film stars Jean-Claude Van Damme and Raul Julia (in his final theatrical film role), with Byron Mann, Damian Chapa, Kylie Minogue, Ming-Na Wen and Wes Studi in supporting roles.

The adaptation focuses on the efforts by Colonel William Guile (Van Damme) to bring down General M. Bison (Julia), the military dictator and drug kingpin of Shadaloo City who aspires to conquer the world with an army of genetic supersoldiers, while enlisting the aid of street fighters Ryu Hoshi (Mann) and Ken Masters (Chapa) to infiltrate Bison's empire and help destroy it from within.

The film was commercially successful, with a worldwide box office gross approximately three times its production costs. Home video releases and television broadcasts were also profitable. While it earned Capcom a return of ¥15.5 billion ($165 million) from the box office and home media, it was poorly received by critics and fans for its campy tone, unfaithfulness to the source material, and overblown effects. However, Julia's performance as M. Bison was singled out for widespread critical acclaim and garnered him a posthumous nomination for the Saturn Award for Best Supporting Actor and the film has since developed as a cult classic. The film was Julia's final theatrical performance, as he died of a stroke two months before the film's release; the film is dedicated to his memory.

== Plot ==
In Thailand, civil war occurs between the forces of drug lord-turned-General M. Bison of Shadaloo and the Allied Nations led by Colonel William F. Guile. Bison captures 64 A.N. relief workers, and via a live broadcast, demands Guile secure a US$20 billion ransom in three days. Guile refuses and vows to track down Bison and put him on trial for his crimes. His assistant, Lieutenant Cammy White, is only partially able to pinpoint Bison's location to the river-delta region outside the city. One hostage is Guile's friend, Sergeant Carlos "Charlie" Blanka, whom Bison orders taken to his lab for his scientist, Dr. Dhalsim, to turn into the first of his supersoldiers, while killing the other captive soldiers. Though Charlie is severely disfigured by the procedure due to Bison's loyal scientists, Dhalsim secretly alters his cerebral programming to maintain Charlie's humanity.

American con artists and martial artists Ryu Hoshi and Ken Masters attempt to swindle arms dealer Viktor Sagat by selling him fake weaponry. Sagat sees through the ruse and has Ryu fight his cage champion, Vega. However, Guile bursts in and arrests the spectators and fighters present for violating a curfew. On the prison grounds, he witnesses Ryu and Ken fighting Sagat's men and recruits them to help him find Bison in exchange for their freedom, since Sagat is Bison's arms supplier. They are given a homing device and win Sagat's trust by staging a prison escape and faking Guile's death. News reporter Chun-Li Zang, whose father was killed by Bison 20 years earlier, and her crew, former sumo wrestler Edmond Honda and boxer Balrog, who are out for revenge against Sagat for ruining their careers, stumble across the plan. Over Guile's objections, they attempt to assassinate Bison and Sagat at a party. To maintain the warlords' trust, Ryu and Ken stop the assassination, revealing the conspirators to Bison.

Returning to his base, Bison inducts Ryu and Ken into his organization, orders Honda and Balrog imprisoned and tortured, and has Chun-Li taken to his quarters. Ryu and Ken break Balrog and Honda out of confinement and rush to confront Bison, who is fighting Chun-Li. Bison escapes and releases sleeping gas, sedating them all. Guile plans his assault on Bison's base. He is impeded by the A.N., who decide to pay Bison the ransom. Nevertheless, Guile and his loyal troops proceed with the mission. At the base, Dhalsim's deception is discovered by a security guard; during the ensuing fight, Blanka is released, and he kills the guard to protect Dhalsim. Guile arrives, sneaks into the lab, and encounters Charlie. Guile prepares to shoot Charlie to end his suffering, but Dhalsim stops him.

After the deadline expired, Bison prepares to kill the hostages by unleashing Charlie on them, but Guile emerges and engages Bison's guards until the remaining A.N. forces arrive. Bison emerges and he and Guile are eventually cornered between their respective soldiers. When Bison makes it clear that he will not surrender peacefully, both Guile and Bison orders their men out and engage each other in a personal duel. While Ryu and Ken encounter and defeat Sagat and Vega. Bison's computer expert Dee Jay flees through a secret passage, joined by Sagat. Bison's bodyguard, Zangief, engages Honda in a fight until learning from Dee Jay that Bison was the true enemy of freedom and peace, and sides with Ryu and Ken to save the hostages.

Guile gains the upper hand against Bison and kicks him into a bank of hard drives, electrocuting him. A revival system restores Bison, who reveals that his suit has advanced automatic first-aid mechanisms and electrical weaponry, including superconducting boots that enable him to fly. These gadgets allow Bison to gain the upper hand and beat Guile. As he moves to deal the death blow, Guile counters by kicking Bison into his monitor wall, which explodes, apparently killing him and overloading the base's energy storage system. The hostages are rescued, but Guile stays behind to convince Dhalsim and Charlie to return with him. They refuse, with Dhalsim wishing to atone for his role in Charlie's mutation. Guile flees the exploding base and reunites with his comrades.

In a post-credits scene, Bison is restored once again when solar power reactivates his base's system, and his fist emerges through the rubble.

== Cast ==
- Jean-Claude Van Damme as Guile
- Raúl Juliá as M. Bison
- Ming-Na Wen as Chun-Li
- Damian Chapa as Ken Masters
- Kylie Minogue as Cammy
- Byron Mann as Ryu
- Grand L. Bush as Balrog
- Robert Mammone as Charlie / Blanka
- Gregg Rainwater as T. Hawk
- Peter Tuiasosopo as E. Honda
- Andrew Bryniarski as Zangief
- Miguel A. Núñez Jr. as Dee Jay
- Jay Tavare as Vega
- Wes Studi as Sagat
- Roshan Seth as Dhalsim
- Kenya Sawada as Captain Sawada
- Simon Callow as A.N. Official
- Sander Vanocur as GNT news anchor
- Adrian Cronauer as A.N. Forces D.J.
- Edward R. Pressman as lonely cook
- Joe Bugner as Bison's torturer
- Darcy LaPier as Guile's date
- Benny Urquidez as Sagat gang member

== Production ==
The film's production budget was ¥4 billion ($35 million), with Capcom alone financing most of the budget. Because Capcom was co-financier of the film, every aspect of the production required their approval. Among other points, they mandated a December 1994 release date, which required the cast and crew to maintain an aggressive filming schedule. Steven E. de Souza says he wrote the initial draft of the script overnight, being made aware that Capcom executives were in Los Angeles on short notice and because he himself was a fan of the game.

Steven Seagal was at one point signed to play hero William Guile, though Capcom's preferred choice of Jean-Claude Van Damme was ultimately cast. Raul Julia said he accepted the role of antagonist M. Bison because his children were huge fans of the video game series. Van Damme and Julia accounted for most of the casting budget, and Van Damme's fee alone took nearly $8 million of the film's $35-million budget. This meant other roles went to mostly unknown actors, such as Byron Mann, Damian Chapa, Peter Navy Tuiasosopo and Grand L. Bush. Kylie Minogue was cast as Cammy White as a result of the Australian Actors' Guild wanting de Souza to hire an Australian actor. By the time he received the request, Cammy was the only part not yet cast. De Souza first learned of Minogue from her cover photo on a "World's 30 Most Beautiful People" edition of Who magazine. Japanese actor Kenya Sawada appeared in the film as a part of a promotional contract with Capcom. Capcom originally wanted Sawada to play the role of Ryu but de Souza remained resolute and stuck with Mann for the role.

The cast's physical training was overseen by Benny Urquidez, a kickboxer and occasional actor, who also appears in a small role in Street Fighter. Charlie Picerni was hired as the stunt coordinator; he took the job with the condition that he would need ample time to train the cast. De Souza agreed, but plans changed after Julia's cancer diagnosis. Initially plans were to shoot Julia's less-intensive scenes first, while the rest of the cast would train with Picerni. However, de Souza soon realized the filming schedule would need major adjustments to accomidate Julia's illness. This led to an environment where the cast would be trained shortly before their action scenes, sometimes only a few hours ahead of filming.

De Souza stated that did not want to make a generic martial arts movie and described the film as a cross between Star Wars, James Bond and a war film. In addition, he indicated an intention to minimize some elements of the game to streamline the film adaptation, citing the previous year's poorly received Super Mario Bros. as being cluttered with too many game details. De Souza said he avoided the supernatural and superhuman elements from the games, but would hint at their use for a sequel.

Street Fighter was filmed mostly in Queensland, Australia along the famous Gold Coast during the second and third quarters of 1994. Most of the interiors and exteriors filmed on soundstages in Brisbane. Some exterior scenes were filmed in Bangkok, Thailand which were used as the backdrop for the fictitious Shadaloo City. The Bangkok scenes were filmed first, in the second quarter of 1994, with filming in Australia beginning after three weeks in Bangkok. De Souza envisioned the attack on Bison's hide-out to include helicopters but was unable to do so due to the political instability in neighboring Myanmar, which is why the AN troops attack via boats instead. This was referenced in the film's final script.

The Motion Picture Association gave an R classification to the first final edit of Street Fighter. This was unacceptable to Capcom, who wanted a PG-13 rating which was attained after edits.. The post-credits scene where Bison is revived was omitted from the theatrical release "out of deference to Raul Julia" but was retained in home video and DVD releases.

== Music ==
=== Soundtrack ===
A soundtrack was released on December 6, 1994, by Priority Records featuring mostly rap or hip-hop, which predates the soundtrack of Street Fighter III: 3rd Strike. The soundtrack found mild success, peaking at No. 135 on the Billboard 200 and #34 on the Top R&B/Hip-Hop Albums chart. Upon its release on home video in the United Kingdom, the soundtrack was given away free with every purchase of the VHS tape at branches of Tesco for a limited period. Although this was the only way for anybody in the UK to purchase the CD, "Straight to My Feet" by Hammer was still released as a single, which charted #57 on the UK singles chart.

=== Score ===
Graeme Revell composed the film's score, an hour of which was released by Varèse Sarabande. Revell ignored previously existing music from the franchise. The music differs from Revell's more popular style, most notably with the absence of pervasive electronic elements and is entirely orchestral as the score is performed by the London Symphony Orchestra. The campy style of the film is reflected in the score's parody cues. The music during the scene where Ryu faces Vega (Jay Tavare) in the cage fight quotes Georges Bizet's Habanera from the opera Carmen, and a theme heard throughout the score, particularly in the track "Colonel Guile Addresses the Troops", is reminiscent of Bruce Broughton's main theme for Tombstone.

== Release ==
=== Theatrical ===
Street Fighter opened in New York and Los Angeles on December 23, 1994.

=== Home media ===
The film was released on the VHS format in 1995, initially for video rental stores. In the United States, the film sold more than 250,000 rental tapes in 1995. The film was also broadcast on cable television and later released on DVD, Blu-ray and digital streaming. The film's home video releases and television broadcasts have been profitable for Capcom, which earned a return of ¥15.5 billion ($165 million) from the film's box office and home media revenue.

== Reception ==
=== Box office ===
The film earned $3,124,775 on its opening day. It grossed $9,508,030 on its opening weekend, ranking at No. 3 behind Dumb and Dumber and The Santa Clause at the box office. On its second weekend it grossed $7,178,360 and dropped down to No. 7. The film grossed $33,423,521 at the domestic box office and $66,000,000 at the international box office, making a total of $99,423,521 worldwide. According to the 2024 shareholder's meeting at Capcom, the movie is still making tens of millions of yen each year.

=== Critical response ===
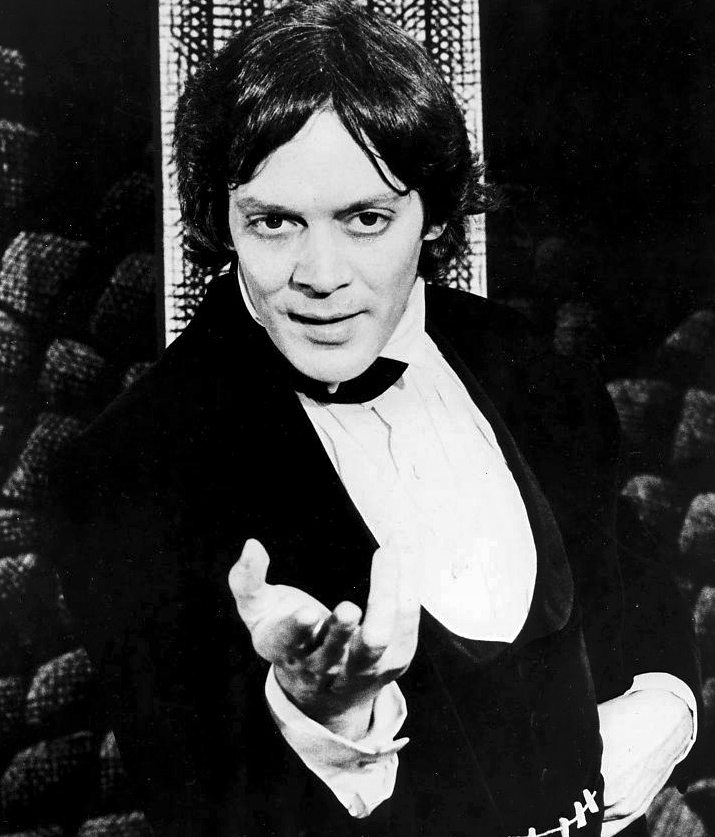
Despite the film's negative reception, Raul Julia received critical praise for his performance.

On the review aggregator website Rotten Tomatoes, 20% of 90 critics' reviews are positive, with an average rating of 3.3/10. The website's consensus reads: "Though it offers mild entertainment through campy one-liners and the overacting of the late Raul Julia, Street Fighter's nonstop action sequences are not enough to make up for a predictable, uneven storyline." Metacritic, which uses a weighted average, assigned the film a score of 34 out of 100, based on 21 critics, indicating "generally unfavorable" reviews. Audiences polled by CinemaScore gave the film an average grade of "B−" on an A+ to F scale.

Leonard Maltin gave the film his lowest rating, writing that "even Jean-Claude Van Damme fans couldn't rationalize this bomb." Richard Harrington of The Washington Post said the film was "notable only for being the last film made by Raúl Juliá, an actor far too skilled for the demands of the evil warlord, Gen. M. Bison, but far too professional to give anything less than his best." Critic Stephen Holden of The New York Times referred to the film as "a dreary, overstuffed hodgepodge of poorly edited martial arts sequences and often unintelligible dialogue." Writing for Variety, Emanuel Levy stated that the film "suffers from the same problems that impaired Super Mario Bros.: It's noisy, overblown and effects-laden and lacks sustained action or engaging characters." Levy commented on Julia, referring to it as "his weakest performances, accentuating each and every syllable as if he were reciting a Shakespearean role of grand emotional range. It's too bad, for this is the accomplished actor's last film, and it is dedicated to him."

Leslie Felperin of Sight & Sound described Kylie Minogue as Cammy "hilarious miscasting as a military wench with Heidi plaits. The merest glimpse of her holding a bazooka and looking mean is enough to induce giggles in the most dour of viewers." David Hunter of The Hollywood Reporter said the film is "neither a satisfying martial arts exercise for star Jean-Claude Van Damme nor the irresistible mainstream diversion it strives for."

=== Accolades ===
In 2009, Time listed the film on their list of top ten worst video games movies. GameTrailers ranked the film as the eighth worst video game film of all time. The film also received two nominations at the 21st Saturn Awards: Best Science Fiction Film and Best Supporting Actor (a posthumous nomination for Raul Julia).

== Other media ==
=== Comic book ===
A one-shot comic book adaptation of the film, titled Street Fighter: The Battle for Shadaloo, was published by DC Comics in 1995. The comic was drawn by Nick J. Napolitano and written by Mike McAvennie. A Japanese one-shot manga adaptation by Takayuki Sakai was also published in the June 1995 issue of CoroCoro Comics Special.

=== Video games ===
Two video games based on the film were produced. The first was a coin-operated arcade game titled Street Fighter: The Movie, produced by American developer Incredible Technologies and distributed by Capcom. The second was a home video game developed by Capcom also titled Street Fighter: The Movie, released for the PlayStation and Sega Saturn. Despite sharing the same title, neither game is a port of the other, although they both used the same digitized footage of the film's cast posing as the characters in each game. Capcom also announced that an "enhanced port" was being created for the Sega 32X by their newly formed USA research and development department. This version was never released.

== Franchise ==
=== Cancelled sequel, spin-off and reboot ===
By 2003, plans were being made for a sequel, Street Fighter II. Rumored cast members included Van Damme, Dolph Lundgren and Holly Valance. The project never materialized.

In 2009, 20th Century Fox released Street Fighter: The Legend of Chun-Li, to worse reception than the original.

On April 3, 2023, it was reported that Legendary Entertainment had acquired the film rights to the Street Fighter games and had begun work on a new live-action film. Originally set for release on March 20, 2026, by Sony Pictures Releasing, the film was removed from the release schedule and delayed indefinitely in March 2025. In September 2025, it was given a new date of October 16, 2026, with Paramount Pictures taking over as distributor following the closure of a new agreement with Legendary.

=== Television series ===
Many plot elements of the film, such as Blanka/Charlie's identity, Chun Li's role as a journalist reporter, Ryu & Ken's roles as con-artists, Dhalsim's role as a scientist, Zangief's role as Bison's muscle and Sagat's role as a crime boss were reused in the American-produced 1995 Street Fighter animated series, which combined story aspects of the film with those in the games such as Super Street Fighter II Turbo, Street Fighter Alpha 2 and Final Fight. Both Dan Hibiki and Gen were the only street fighters to be cut out of the show.

=== Web series ===
In 2014, Street Fighter: Assassin's Fist was released in both television series and movie format to YouTube, focusing on Ryu (Mike Moh) and Ken Masters (Christian Howard)'s training under Gouken (Akira Koieyama), as well as Gouken's troubled relationship with his brother Akuma (Gaku Space) over the Dark Hadou. The series was met with widespread acclaim.

== See also ==
- List of films based on video games
