= Peter Tuiasosopo =

American football player and actor (1963–2025)

Peter Navy Tuiasosopo
- Born: December 22, 1963; San Pedro, California, U.S.
- Died: February 10, 2025 (aged 61); Phoenix, Arizona, U.S.
- Occupation: Actor
- Years active: 1992–2025
- Spouse: Cheryl D. Leonard
- Football career

No. 68
- Position: Center

Personal information
- Listed height: 6 ft 2 in (1.88 m)
- Listed weight: 285 lb (129 kg)

Career information
- High school: Phineas Banning (Wilmington, California)
- College: Utah State
- NFL draft: 1987: undrafted

Career history
- St. Louis Cardinals (1987) (Note: undrafted free agent); Los Angeles Rams (1987–1988)

Career NFL statistics
- Games played: 3
- Stats at Pro Football Reference

Peter Navy Tuiasosopo (December 22, 1963 – February 10, 2025) was an American actor and professional football player. He is known for his roles as E. Honda in Street Fighter (1994) and Manumana in Necessary Roughness (1991). He also played custodian Yoshi Nakamura in the Disney Channel series Kickin' It.

Tuiasosopo played football as a center in the National Football League (NFL) for the Los Angeles Rams. He played college football for the Utah State Aggies.

== Early life ==
Tuiasosopo was born and raised in San Pedro, Los Angeles, California, as one of seven children. His father, Manavaalofa Petelo, served in the U.S. Army for 27 years and worked for the U.S. Postal Service, and his mother, Silaulala "Sheila" Lealoa Alofaituli, was a registered nurse.

Tuiasosopo attended Taper Avenue Elementary and San Pedro High School in San Pedro, California. He lettered in both football as an offensive/defensive lineman and on the track team as a shot putter. He accepted a football scholarship from Utah State University.

== Career ==
=== Professional football ===
Tuiasosopo was signed as an undrafted free agent by the St. Louis Cardinals after the 1987 NFL draft. He was waived on August 1. Following the NFL players' strike in the third week of the 1987 season, he was signed to the Los Angeles Rams' roster of replacement players. He started three games at center but was released after the strike ended.

In 1988, Tuiasosopo was re-signed by the Rams, but was cut during the preseason. He was signed again and then released during preseason by the Rams the following year.

=== Acting ===
Tuiasosopo turned to acting after his football career. His film debut was as Laikai "The Slender" Manumana in the 1991 sports comedy Necessary Roughness. He took a leave of absence from McDonnell Douglas in Long Beach, California for the film. Shortly afterwards, he co-starred in his first television series with Adam West as the strong-armed detective Al Hamoki for the Fox network called Danger Theatre. He is perhaps best known for his portrayal of Edmond Honda in the live action movie Street Fighter (1994), which introduced a new origin for the character as that of a news cameraman instead of a sumo wrestler. He also had roles in BASEketball, The Scorpion King, The Fast and the Furious, Austin Powers in Goldmember, 12 Rounds, Speedracer and Hawaii.

== Personal life and death ==
Tuiasosopo had several relatives who played football. His uncle was Bob Apisa, and his cousins were Manu Tuiasosopo, John Tautolo Terry Tautolo, and Marques Tuiasosopo. His niece is American rower Lanea Tuiasosopo.

Tuiasosopo died from heart complications in Phoenix, Arizona, on February 10, 2025, at the age of 61.

== Filmography ==
Year	Title	Role	Notes
1991	Necessary Roughness	Laikai "The Slender" Manumana	
1993	Danger Theatre	Detective Al Hamoki	
1994	On Deadly Ground	Worker #1	
1994	Street Fighter	E. Honda	
1996	The Jamie Foxx Show	Jackie Chin	
1997	Batman & Robin	Observatory Guard	
1998	BASEketball	Ed Tuttle	
2000	Charlie's Angels	Pink's Bodyguard	
2001	The Fast and the Furious	Bodyguard	
2002	The Scorpion King	Night Gate Guard	
2008	Speed Racer	Fuji Announcer #2	
2009	12 Rounds	Willie Dumaine	
2009	A Perfect Getaway	Supply Guy	
2009	The Slammin' Salmon	Miami Dolphin #1	
2011	Kickin' It	Yoshi Nakamura	
2011	The Young and the Restless	Koaa	
2012	Fun Size	Mr. Mahani (Samoan Man)	
2012–2016	New Girl	Steve and Big Bob	
2013	NCIS	Charles Kang / Chucky Bang	Episode: "Hereafter"
2013	Mob City	Big Oso	
2015	Ray Donovan	Samoan Guard	
2015	Black-ish	Officer Tuiasosopo	
2018	Mayans MC	Afa	
2021	Magnum P.I.	Manui Vasega	
