= M. Bison =

Street Fighter character

- Street Fighter character
- Bison in Super Street Fighter II (1993)
- First appearance: Street Fighter II (1991)
- Created by: Yoshiki Okamoto
- Designed by: Akira "Akiman" Yasuda and Ikuo "Ikusan.Z" Nakayama (Street Fighter II)
- Portrayed by: Raul Julia (Street Fighter: The Movie); Neal McDonough (Street Fighter: The Legend of Chun-Li); Silvio Simac (Street Fighter: Resurrection); David Dastmalchian (2026 film)
- Voiced by: English: Tom Wyner (Street Fighter II: The Animated Movie, Street Fighter II V (Animaze Dub)); Markham Anderson (Street Fighter II V (ADV Films dub # 1)); Mike Kleinhenz (Street Fighter II V (ADV Films dub # 2); Richard Newman (TV series); Gerald C. Rivers (Street Fighter IV, Street Fighter X Tekken, Street Fighter V, Wreck-It Ralph, Street Fighter 6); Japanese: Tomomichi Nishimura (Street Fighter Alpha series, Street Fighter EX series, Marvel vs. Capcom series, Namco x Capcom); Kenji Utsumi (Street Fighter II V, Japanese television dub of the Street Fighter film); Norio Wakamoto (Capcom vs. SNK series, SVC Chaos: SNK vs. Capcom, Capcom Fighting Evolution, Street Fighter IV, Street Fighter X Tekken, Street Fighter V, Project X Zone 2, Ultra Street Fighter II); Banjō Ginga (CD drama); Masaharu Satō (Street Fighter Zero drama CD); Takeshi Kusaka (Street Fighter II: The Animated Movie); Makoto Gunji (Street Fighter II Turbo commercial); Tesshō Genda (Japanese video and DVD dub of the Street Fighter film); Tetsuo Mizutori (Real Battle on Film); Kazuhiro Yamaji (Japanese dub of Street Fighter: The Legend of Chun-Li); Taiten Kusunoki (Wreck-It Ralph, Street Fighter 6)
- Motion capture: Darko Tuskan (The Movie games)

In-universe information
- Fighting style: Psycho Power-infused style based on Lerdrit

M. Bison, known in Japan as Vega (Japanese: ベガ, Hepburn: Bega), is a character and the main antagonist of the Street Fighter series created by Capcom. First introduced in Street Fighter II: The World Warrior (1991) as the final boss of the game, he has since become a recurring character in the series, often serving as both a boss and a playable character.

A would-be world dictator and megalomaniac, M. Bison's ultimate ambition is to control the world's governments through his covert crime syndicate, Shadaloo (シャドルー, Shadorū; sometimes spelled as "Shadoloo", "Shadowloo" or "Shadowlaw"). He hosts Street Fighter II's fighting tournament and is the last opponent fought in the game. Throughout the series, several characters — including, Guile, T. Hawk, Cammy, Rose and Chun-Li — have their personal vendettas against M. Bison and have entered the tournament in the hopes of facing him personally, while M. Bison routinely sets his eyes on the series' protagonist Ryu in order to either acquire his power or recruit him for his cause. M. Bison wields an inherently evil energy known as "Psycho Power", in contrast to Ryu and Ken's "Hadou".

In a variety of media, Bison has been portrayed by Raul Julia, Neal McDonough, Silvio Šimac, and David Dastmalchian, and voiced by Tom Wyner, Richard Newman and Gerald C. Rivers. Julia was nominated for a posthumous Saturn Award for Best Supporting Actor for his performance.

== Conception and development ==
In Japan, the character is named Vega (ベガ, Bega), derived from the star of the same name. However, during localization of Street Fighter II for the English language market, Capcom's North American branch felt that the name did not sound threatening enough to North American audiences for the game's final boss, and thus was more suitable for the Spanish cage fighter. At this same time, another concern arose that the name of another character, Mike Bison, conceived as a pastiche to real-life boxer Mike Tyson, would be a legal liability for Capcom. As a result, the characters' names were changed, and the game's final boss was dubbed M. Bison for international appearances of the character. Though the "M" originally stood for "Mike" in Japan (for the boxer character), Capcom has never explained what it stands for in Western releases, calling it "part of the character's mystery". The story of Street Fighter 6 acknowledged this change within the context of its narrative, claiming that all three names were aliases that Shadaloo's leadership operated under to protect their true identities.

Although his nationality is never given, he is usually depicted as fighting in or around Thailand, or in fictional locations such as Point 48106.

When developing Street Fighter II: The Animated Movie, it was decided to give him a more muscular appearance, rather than have him resemble "a middle aged man", while his face was modified to appear somewhat demonic. This appearance was later carried onto the Street Fighter Alpha series, featured as his original appearance before the Street Fighter II series.

The first source of inspiration for M. Bison's design came from the character General Washizaki, one of the main villains of the popular martial arts manga Riki-Oh. Additionally, Yasunori Katō, a fictional character appeared in the Teito Monogatari series and other productions such as the Yokai Monsters, served as another inspiration source for M. Bison.

For Street Fighter 6, Takayuki Nakayama and the rest of the staff began to design M. Bison after the main cast was completed. His return to the franchise was planned for some time, and there were many voices on the staff calling for Bison to return; producer Shuhei Matsumoto, for instance, has been a regular Bison player since Super Street Fighter IV. Nakayama noted that the team planned to portray Bison in a different light for this entry, since the character JP is the villain for this installment; his arcade mode delves further into this new characterization. His gameplay was also altered for his latest appearance, with his supernatural techniques being removed in favour of a more hand-to-hand approach.

== Appearances ==
=== Street Fighter series ===
Bison first appears in Street Fighter II: The World Warrior as the final computer-controlled opponent in the single-player mode at a temple in Bangkok, Thailand. He became a playable character from Champion Edition and onward, while maintaining his position as the final boss until Super Street Fighter II Turbo, in which a hidden character named Akuma defeats Bison and challenges the player as an alternate final boss. The storyline through the numerous versions of Street Fighter II characterizes Bison as the leader of a criminal organization called "Shadaloo" who sponsors the World Warrior tournament. Bison later appears in the Street Fighter Alpha trilogy, a prequel to the Street Fighter II series. In Street Fighter Alpha: Warriors' Dreams, Bison appears as the final boss for certain characters and a hidden playable character available via a code. Street Fighter Alpha 2, has Bison featured in this game as a playable character. In Street Fighter Alpha 3, a powered-up version of M. Bison serves as the final boss of the game. Several revelations are made in this game, including the fact that Rose, not only being former fellow disciple of Soul Power, but also a good half of Bison's soul, while Cammy is a female clone of Bison and an unknown individual. Bison is revealed to be dying due to the strain of Psycho Power on his body and the only thing keeping him alive is his Psycho Drive, which brings him to search for Ryu, whose body he has deemed worthy of possession. Bison fights Ryu but is defeated. Bison transfers his soul into Rose's body before dying.

The main villain of Street Fighter IV is Seth, an android previously created for Bison's soul to inhabit but went rogue and usurped the leadership of S.I.N., a subsidiary of Shadaloo. It is later revealed, however, that Bison is actually the true mastermind behind the game's events, and was secretly manipulating Seth to further his own agendas before revealing himself again. In the near climax of the game, however, Bison tries to capture Rose again, but was forced to retreat and leave her because of Guy's interference. Bison appears in Street Fighter V. Shadaloo enacts a plan known as "Operation C.H.A.I.N.S." in which seven artificial satellites known as the "Black Moons" are constructed to cause various cities around the world to lose power, thereby creating commotion which fuels Bison's Psycho Power due to negative emotions. When the plan is ultimately foiled, a resurrected Charlie Nash sacrifices himself to weaken Bison, leaving Ryu to defeat him one last time. After his presumed death, a ghost empowered by Psycho Power of himself called Phantom Bison is mostly shown haunting both of his former vessels, Falke and Ed.

Bison returns in Street Fighter 6 via downloadable content, where he previously was revealed to have bestowed Psycho Power to JP prior to Shadaloo's downfall. Bison's depiction is a departure from previous appearances, and he has developed amnesia. Bison also reveals to have saved a dying male horse by imbuing him with Psycho Power at Nayshall. The amnesiac Bison is later revealed to be one of the original Bison's clone bodies, who absorbs Phantom Bison and decides to take up leadership of Shadaloo once more.

=== Other games ===
Bison appears in Street Fighter: The Movie, a 1995 video game adaptation of the 1994 film. The game looks similar to early Mortal Kombat games, due to each character being represented by digitized sprites of the film's actors. Bison's fight animations were performed by Australian stuntman Darko Tuscan. Film clips of Juliá as Bison are included within the game's cutscenes.

In Street Fighter EX, and Street Fighter EX2 Plus, Bison serves as a boss. In Street Fighter EX3, he gains a tag-team super move when paired with Vega. He also often featured in the Marvel vs. Capcom but noticeably absent from Marvel vs. Capcom: Clash of Super Heroes, though he appears in Chun-Li and Shadow Lady's ending sequences. In Marvel vs. Capcom 2: New Age of Heroes (2000), the Alpha version of Bison is once again a playable character, though he must be unlocked. M. Bison does not appear in Marvel vs. Capcom 3: Fate of Two Worlds, but he is mentioned by Chun-Li in one of her win quotes, and in Ultimate Marvel vs. Capcom 3, one of Wesker's alternate colors is based on M. Bison's design. M. Bison also makes a cameo appearance in Dormammu's ending in UMVC3. Bison reappears in the SNK vs. Capcom series, with an appearance that resembled his original Street Fighter II sprite instead of Alpha ones. He has regularly appeared in each entry of the series, beginning with SNK vs. Capcom: The Match of the Millennium (1999) and its sequels, Capcom vs. SNK Pro: Millennium Fight 2000 and Capcom vs. SNK 2 (2001). For SNK vs. Capcom Bison with Geese are the penultimate boss encounter or last battle if the player lost their rival battle that takes place before the tourney's final. Bison also appears as a trading card in the handheld collectible card game SNK vs. Capcom: Card Fighters' Clash (1999) and SNK vs. Capcom: SVC Chaos (2003).

Bison appears in Capcom Fighting Jam (2004), which features an assortment of characters from each individual series published by Capcom. In the game, Bison is part of the Street Fighter II roster. Other roles include the Japanese action/tactical RPG hybrids Namco × Capcom and Project X Zone 2, in which he appears as a boss, and Street Fighter X Tekken, with Juri as his official tag partner. Alternate versions of Bison often appear as a stronger boss in games he is included.

== In other media ==
=== Live action ===
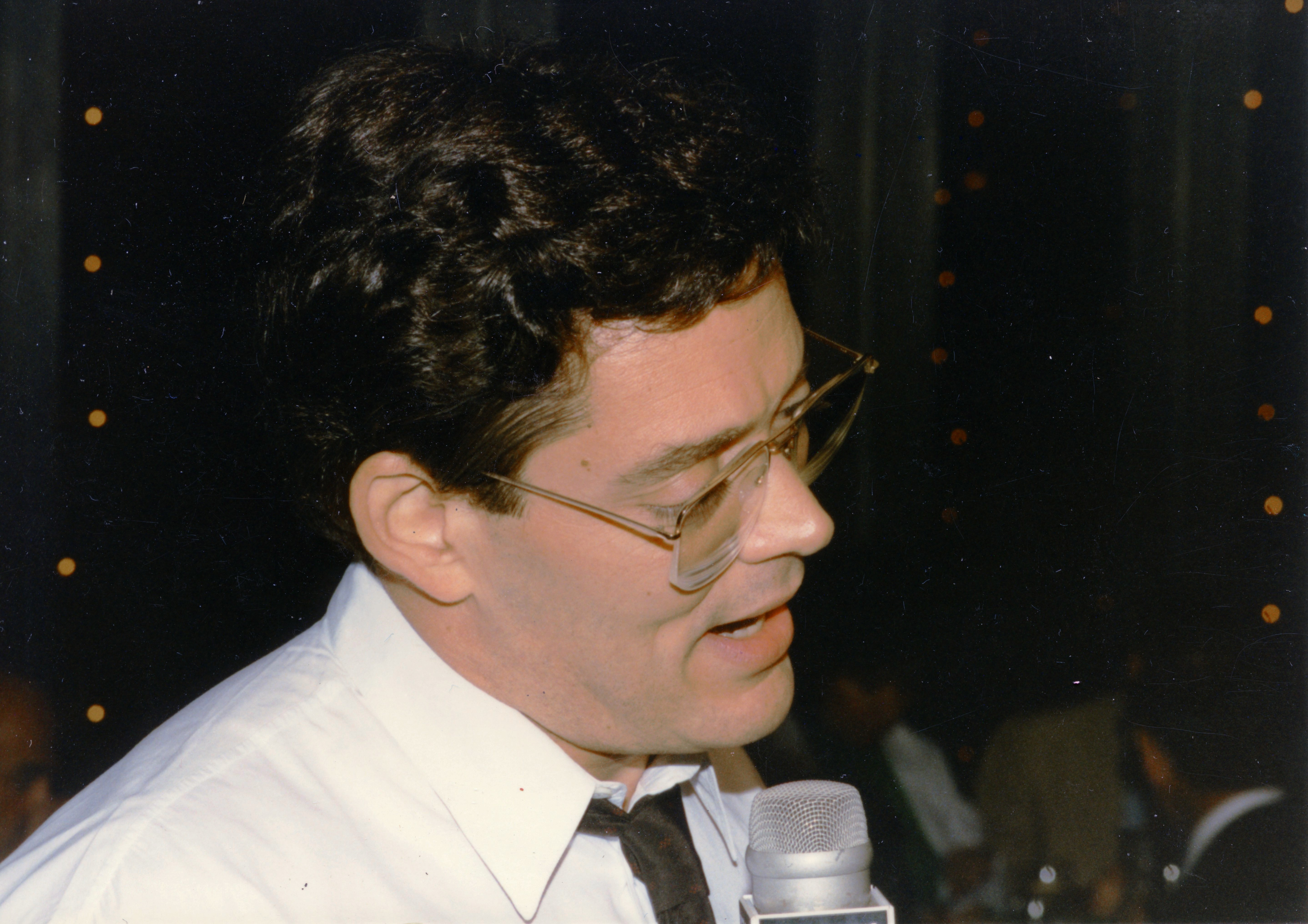
Raúl Juliá portrayed General M. Bison in Street Fighter

Raúl Juliá played Bison in the 1994 live-action film adaption of the series. Julia perceived Bison in the same vein of villain as Richard III, and approached the role with a Shakespearean tone. In the film, Bison is a British psychopathic drug kingpin, genius scientist and notorious military dictator who controls not only Shadaloo (here depicted as his hostile dictatorship instead of his organization) but also the drug industry with an iron fist. One of his goals in the film is to produce supersoldiers to take over the world and establish a new order known as "Pax Bisonica" using his drug profits. His ambitions have led to a war in Shadaloo with the Allied Nations (AN), led by Colonel Guile, the movie's main character who has been sent to place Bison under arrest for his war crimes. In the film, while Ryu plays a vital role in Bison's downfall by helping to lure Guile to Bison's base, Bison and Ryu do not fight, though at one point, Ryu attempts to fight Bison alongside Ken, Chun-Li, E. Honda and Balrog. In the climax, he fights Guile and very nearly kills him with his uniform's built-in electromagnetism (the film's stand-in for Bison's Psycho Power), but he is defeated when Guile kicks him into his gigantic monitor screen and leaves him to die when the base explodes. A post-credits scene only available on the home-video release shows Bison resurrected through a solar-powered life support machine. This version of Bison appears in the arcade game based on the film, Street Fighter: The Movie, as well as in the home video game bearing the same title. In the home version, he is the main antagonist of the Movie Battle mode, and a non-playable super-powered version of him serves as the final boss. If the player loses the Movie Battle mode, the ending says that Bison was paid the ransom money and he released the hostages, but perfected his super soldier army and unleashed them on the world two years later. Bison also serves as the final opponent in the Street Battle mode, following Zangief, Dee Jay and Sagat, even if one plays as Bison himself. In his ending, he is said to have crushed Colonel Guile in personal combat and defeated his AN Forces, and subsequently brought the world under the control of his Pax Bisonica empire. In both games, Bison is physically portrayed by Darko Tuscan, who served as Raúl Juliá's stunt double in the film, and cutscenes of Juliá as Bison are shown throughout the game.

Neal McDonough portrayed Bison in Street Fighter: The Legend of Chun-Li. He appears as the main antagonist once again, this time opposite Chun-Li. The film shows Bison donning a business suit rather than his signature costume and is depicted as a crime boss and secret drug kingpin disguised as a Thailand-based multilingual Irish international businessman instead of a military man, although he is also shown to be in charge of his own paramilitary force. In a backstory told by Gen, Bison was abandoned by his Irish missionary parents in Thailand when he was an infant and lived his entire life engaging in acts of theft. He then sacrificed his pregnant wife in the bowels of a supernatural cave, where he imbued his daughter, Rose, with the goodness of his soul, thus ridding himself of any sense of conscience. Bison's raw physical power is seen to borderline on supernatural, as he usually only required one punch or kick to send an opponent hurtling through the air. His power is first exhibited during his introduction where his spiritual energy was so immense, it heralded his arrival by a soft breeze inside Chun-Li's family manor. He is killed at the end of the film in front of his daughter when Chun-Li twists his head around by use of her legs.

Silvio Simac portrayed Bison in Street Fighter: Resurrection appearing in the final episode observing Ryu, Ken, Laura and Nash through a battered Decapre's eyes while sitting down on his throne behind a massive spherical object before burning a chess piece with his Psycho Power and proclaiming that he shall let them come. Actor Kevin Porter portrays M. Bison in this official crossover between Power Rangers and Street Fighter.

David Dastmalchian portrayed M. Bison in the 2026 reboot.

=== In animation ===
Bison is the main antagonist of the anime film Street Fighter II: The Animated Movie, voiced by Takeshi Kusaka in the Japanese version and the late Tom Wyner in the English dub. Bison's organization, Shadaloo (here named "Shadowlaw"), is stated as being an international terrorist organization, employing a great deal of scientific technology, including cyborgs (known as "Monitor Cyborgs") which pose as humans while broadcasting live images to Bison. Bison issues a worldwide manhunt for Ryu after learning that Ryu defeated Sagat with an unusually high fighting potential, but fails to locate him due to Ryu's ability to suppress his power. He abducts and brainwashes Ken in Ryu's stead after learning of Ken's history with Ryu, while instructing Vega to assassinate Chun-Li. In the film's climax, Bison locates Ryu by tailing Guile and enters the battlefield by setting Ken on Ryu and fighting Guile. He defeats Guile but spares him as an insult, just as Ken manages to overcome Bison's brainwashing. Bison tosses Ken aside and beats Ryu, repeatedly offering him to join Shadowlaw as his subordinate, which Ryu refuses. Ken eventually heals from his injuries and returns to the fight. Bison fights both Ryu and Ken and is defeated when he is struck with a combined Hadoken. Bison survives the attack, however, and reappears at the end of the film driving a truck towards Ryu, who leaps at Bison to fight him again.

Bison appears in the second half of the anime series Street Fighter II V. In the ADV Films dub, he is voiced by Markham Anderson and then later on by Mike Kleinhenz, while Tom Wyner reprises his role from the animated movie for the Animaze English dub. He is still the leader of Shadowlaw, which now has numerous subdivisions, such as the Ashura Syndicate under his associate, Mr. Zochi but has no major history with Guile nor Chun-Li as opposed to other versions. When Ashura is destroyed by Ryu, Ken, Chun-Li, Fei-Long and Inspector Dorai (Chun-Li's father). Bison succeeds in brainwashing both Chun-Li and Ryu and setting them on Guile and Ken, respectively, after killing Charlie Nash after a botched rescue. In the end, Ken manages to break Bison's control on Ryu, and the two take on Bison. Bison, clearly the superior fighter, easily handles both Ryu and Ken, until they discover that Bison can be damaged with their Hadou powers. Ryu uses a series of moves to defeat Bison.

Voiced by Richard Newman in the American Street Fighter, Bison's attack on Chun-Li's village. The second season explored Bison's relationship with Cammy in the same manner as the games, with Cammy being triggered as a "sleeper agent" in the opening episodes. She discovers that Bison had murdered her parents after discovering they were MI5 agents and brainwashed her into becoming a sleeper agent in the series finale, but not before she reestablishes her romantic bond with him. Bison seems to worship a Thai deity that instructs him on what to do with his resources, and in the finale, Bison convinces himself he has been told to destroy the Earth through the launching of nuclear missiles. Bison eventually engages Guile in a showdown which concludes when Guile who kicks Bison into a computer and fires a sonic boom at him, unleashing a strong magnetic force that pulls Bison into the computer, which explodes afterwards, destroying him completely.

Bison is heavily featured as the primary antagonist of the UDON-published Street Fighter comic series. His story is mostly unchanged from the official version, portraying him as the dark and sinister leader of Shadaloo. Bison is the student of a mysterious woman whose tribe has mastered the art of Soul Power. After being exiled from further training, he studies the forbidden texts of their people and learns the nature of Psycho Power, the negative half of Soul Power. He returns to her later in life and uses this power to massacre his mentor's tribe, leaving only one survivor. Like the official story, Bison has a great interest in Ryu after watching him defeat Sagat at the last Street Fighter tournament and observing the nature of the Satsui no Hadō. At the end of the first series of comics, Bison is defeated in a battle Charlie but survives. As the comic moves forward, Bison announces his "Street Fighter II" tournament, until what would have been the final battle between Ryu and Bison. At this point, Akuma intervenes and demands a fight with Ryu. Bison senses the amount of great power Akuma carries and attempts to subdue him in combat, only to be halted by Rose's spirit who restrains him while Akuma kills Bison.

== Reception ==
Since he appeared in Street Fighter II, M. Bison has received mostly positive reception. IGN praised his role as a villain in the series that did not rely solely on his henchmen. IGN described him as a formidable boss and one who has endured for years as a mainstay in the Street Fighter series. GamePro stated "This guy had the nerve to look you dead in the face, threaten your very soul and then tell you he represents an organization called Shadaloo. That's brave, man." Guinness World Records Gamer's Edition listed M. Bison as 17th in their list of top 50 Villains. GameDaily regarded him as one of the best end bosses ever. Digital Spy said Bison is a great villain due to his multiple antagonism with the rest of the cast to the point his chaos is irredeemable. GamesRadar said M. Bison was one of the most infuriating opponents imaginable. In 2014, Capcom UK named M. Bison the "4th Most Powerful Street Fighter Character", while in 2016, Screen Rant named M. Bison the "3rd Most Powerful Street Fighter Character", stating "As the main antagonist of the series, it's only natural M. Bison would also be one of the most powerful characters of the franchise—he's even proven capable of getting the better of Ryu." Club Nintendo praised his intimidating personality back up by a notable power.

Some sites like GameDaily enjoyed his characterization, describing him as one of the most "vile, powerful end bosses ever put into a video game". He was also 2nd in GamesRadar's "The 12 most misunderstood videogame villains" with comments on the various sub-stories Bison is involved in the Street Fighter series. GamesRadar staff described M. Bison as the best villain in video games, stating that "Vega, Master Bison, Dictator - no matter what you call him, anyone who harnesses the destructive might of Psycho Power energy has got to be bad news." 1UP.com listed him as of the characters they wanted to see in Street Fighter X Tekken. Paste considered him a "Saturday morning cartoon villain of the Street Fighter series, and for the most part, it works." Meanwhile, Den of Geek comments "Bison is so sinister that he literally made himself purely evil through magic just so he wouldn't be distracted by his conscience" and praised his fighting styleUGO Networks highlighted that since Bison's true goal is to oppress the world for his own selfish benefit, making him "only villain" in the story. GameSpot listed him at number five on its "Top 10 Video Game Villains" list, stating a preference for his attack set while bemoaning his portrayal in the live action film.

Bison's return in Street Fighter 6 was criticized by Paste Magazine for ruining the story of the previous installment where Ryu kills the villain, leading the heroes to move on with their lives. Inversefelt the character's revival in Street Fighter 6 was similar to how Tekken 8 revived the villain Heihachi Mishima as if they never have a real death in the narrative. He has also been Gen besides Heihachi due to their portrayals as in the games. Bleeding Cool also criticized the character's appearance in Street Fighter 6 to the point of wondering whether or not he was the real villain famous in the franchise. Tech Radar referred to Bison's design as the "most radical" change in the entire cast as he looks very different from his classic look especially when compared to other redesigns Street Fighter 6 characters are given but his special moves were still praised.

Nicholas Ware in a dissertation titled You Must Defeat Sheng Long to Stand a Chance noted M. Bison was surprisingly more muscular and taller in the Alpha games when compared to the hero Ryu. His appearance also stands out for lack pupils in his eyes similar to Akuma and Sagat which emphasizes their antagonistic personalities. This comes as a result of the developers' desire to make the players motivated to defeat such nemesis. However, they are overshadowed by Akuma in an alternate narrative where he comes across as a hidden boss who plays a major role in the corruption of Ryu. Richard Harrington of The Washington Post said the live-action film was "notable only for being the last film made by Raúl Juliá, an actor far too skilled for the demands of the evil warlord, Gen. M. Bison, but far too professional to give anything less than his best."

M. Bison artwork was featured on an officially licensed NubyTech/UDON joypad for the Xbox, announced on May 25, 2005. Pakistani rapper and music producer Adil Omar has also incorporated an M Bison alter-ego inspired by Juliá's portrayal, most notably in his music video for "Mastery". He has also named his Islamabad studio Bisonopolis. M. Bison makes a cameo appearance in the Disney film Wreck-It Ralph with Gerald C. Rivers reprising his role from Street Fighter IV onwards.

== Bibliography ==
- Studio Bent Stuff (Sep 2000). All About Capcom Head-to-Head Fighting Games 1987–2000. A.A. Game History Series (Vol. 1) (in Japanese). Dempa Publications, Inc. ISBN 4-88554-676-1.
