= T. Hawk =

Street Fighter character

Thunder Hawk
- First game: Super Street Fighter II (1993)
- Voiced by: English: David Vincent (2010–present); Japanese: Shōzō Iizuka (Street Fighter II: The Animated Movie); Tōru Nara (2010–present)
- Portrayed by: Gregg Rainwater (1994 film)

In-universe information
- Origin: Mexico
- Ethnicity: Indigenous Mexican

Thunder Hawk (Japanese: サンダーホーク), commonly referred to as T. Hawk, is a character from Capcom's Street Fighter fighting game series, introduced in Super Street Fighter II in 1993. He is an individual from Mexico with indigenous roots, and his storyline focuses on protecting his people and reclaiming land taken from them. He typically appears wearing a feathered headband, a sleeveless shirt, and boots, styled to reflect his cultural background. T. Hawk has been extensively examined by scholars in academic studies for various aspects related to his ethnic representation.

== Design ==
During the development of Super Street Fighter II, T. Hawk was originally named "Geronimo". However, the name was changed after an American staff member raised concerns that it could be considered racially insensitive. Additionally, T. Hawk's conceptual Elvis-style haircut was redesigned to better reflect his indigenous heritage. This change was suggested by Steve Patton, a staff member from Capcom's U.S. office who has Native American ancestry. According to character designer Akira Nishitani, the original concept for T. Hawk featured a crown of bird feathers that stretched from his head down to his waist, based on what the team thought was a common Japanese view of Native American culture. However, a Capcom staff member pointed out that this design was similar to using outdated and offensive stereotypes, like showing Japanese people with slanted eyes and buckteeth. Because of this, the team changed the design to avoid cultural stereotypes.

T. Hawk is a tall and heavy man from Mexico, standing at 230 centimeters (7 feet 7 inches) and weighing 162 kilograms. He is fond of wildlife and hair decorations, and disapproves of dishonesty. As the guardian of the Thunderfoot tribe, he upholds their traditions and values. His hairstyle resembles that of his father, Arroyo Hawk, serving as a tribute to his memory. T. Hawk has long hair and a strong, manly face with a thin nose and a big jaw. His face is decorated with white paint in a tribal style. He wears a headband made of feathers, leather moccasins on his feet, and clothes that have traditional tribal patterns. All these elements are meant to show his connection with the indigenous culture and heritage.

== Appearances ==
T. Hawk made his first appearance in Super Street Fighter II: The New Challengers in 1993 as one of the four new playable characters introduced to the roster. He later returned as selectable in major titles like Street Fighter Alpha 3, Super Street Fighter IV, and Ultra Street Fighter IV. In addition to his primary appearances, he made minor appearances in Capcom Fighting Evolution, Super Smash Bros. Ultimate, and Street Fighter 6; the latter features another playable member of his tribe, Lily. Beyond video games, T. Hawk is featured in animated adaptations such as Street Fighter II: The Animated Movie and the Street Fighter animated television series, along with a 1994 live-action film (portrayed by Gregg Rainwater) and a Street Fighter comic book series published by Udon Entertainment.

== Academic analysis ==
In the academic study "Representation of Native Americans: From Literature to Video Games", conducted by the National University of Distance Education, professor Samuel Martínez Linares states that T. Hawk's narrative, centered on the quest to reclaim ancestral land, follows a recurring visualization used in media portrayals of Indigenous peoples. He observes that T. Hawk's association with nature and animals reflects the "mystical Indian" stereotype, which presents Native individuals as inherently spiritual and deeply connected to nature, often in a historically inaccurate manner. Martínez Linares also criticizes the character's design, including his attire and Thunderfoot tribe, for lacking cultural specificity and relying on generalized representations that are not grounded in any real Indigenous community. Similarly, two academics from the University of Indonesia, Danar Hafidz Adi Wardhana and Saomi Rizqiyanto, analyze T. Hawk using a research method called critical discourse analysis. They identify varieties of stereotypical elements present in his visual design, cultural symbols, and physical features, which reinforce reductive and outdated conceptions of Native American identity. Conclusively, both studies display that T. Hawk's portrayal connects more with familiar stereotypes and offers less importance to the cultural realities of Indigenous heritage.

In another study, Digital Narratives and Linguistic Articulations of Mexican Identities in Emergent Media: Race, Lucha Libre Masks and Mock Spanish, associate professor at the University of Arizona, Daniel Calleros Villarreal, examines how T. Hawk's portrayal fails to align with commonly recognized ideas of Mexican identity. Although the character is officially labeled as Mexican in games and promotional materials, Villarreal argues that his "mexicanidad" feels unconvincing. Reflecting on his own experience as a teenager playing Super Street Fighter II in Mexico, Villarreal recalls that players often referred to T. Hawk as "El Indio" or "El Apache", based on his Native American appearance. His status as Mexican was rarely acknowledged, as his design, with brown skin and Indigenous symbols, did not match typical representations of Mexican identity. Villarreal also points out that T. Hawk's history includes an intense hatred of the character M. Bison for nearly vanishing his tribe, as well as a dislike for wrestling, despite lucha libre being a key cultural symbol in Mexico. His visual design, including a pet bald eagle, connects more to America's imagery than Mexican culture. Even the arcade flyers used to explain his moves listed them in English, with only one referencing Mexico. Villarreal suggests that the problem is not simply the use of stereotypes, but that the ones used belong to a different cultural context. As a result, T. Hawk's identity draws on symbols that do not match dominant ideas of what it means to be Mexican, making his representation feel disconnected and culturally confusing.

In Drexel University's collaborative study Digital Mexican Visual Representation in Video Games, survey data indicated that most participants viewed T. Hawk as a negative representation of their culture. Those who selected T. Hawk as a character that made them feel misrepresented in the media offered several reasons for this perception, primarily focusing on his appearance and cultural coding. Many individuals stated that T. Hawk seemed to reflect Native American culture from countries like the United States or Canada, such as that of the Cherokee, rather than Indigenous Mexican heritage. His clothing and wrestling style were also described as inconsistent with how Indigenous Mexicans are typically perceived, with one participant noting that they had never seen a Mexican dressed like T. Hawk. Others compared him unfavorably to characters like El Fuerte and Necalli, who were seen as more culturally appropriate. A recurring concern was that T. Hawk's design drew more from North American Native stereotypes than from any specific Mexican Indigenous identity. Among all participants, only one individual identified with T. Hawk, citing a shared physical build and describing him as the first Mexican character they had encountered in a video game.
