= Street Fighter: The Movie (console video game) =

1995 video game

- Japanese Sega Saturn cover art
- Developer: Capcom
- Publishers: JP: Capcom; NA/EU: Acclaim Entertainment
- Director: Yoshinori Kawano
- Composers: Yuki Satomura; Yoshinori Ono
- Platforms: Sega Saturn, PlayStation
- Release: Saturn: JP: August 11, 1995; NA: August 23, 1995; EU: September 1995; PlayStation: JP: August 11, 1995; NA: September 9, 1995; EU: September 29, 1995
- Genre: Fighting
- Modes: Single-player, multiplayer

Street Fighter: The Movie (Note: Released in Japan as Street Fighter: Real Battle on Film (Japanese: ストリートファイター リアル・バトル・オン・フィルム) to avoid confusion with the similarly titled Street Fighter II Movie game based on Street Fighter II: The Animated Movie.) is a 1995 fighting game developed and published by Capcom for the PlayStation and Sega Saturn, with the game serving as a North American launch title for the PlayStation. The game is based on the 1994 film Street Fighter, itself based on the fighting game series of the same name, and uses digitized images of the film's cast as the characters. While it shares its title with the arcade game Street Fighter: The Movie, the home version is not a port but a similar game developed on the same premise. The game was a commercial success but a critical failure, receiving negative reviews from critics.

== Gameplay ==
Ryu faces Blanka.

While the graphics consists of the same digitized images of the film's cast that were also used for the arcade version, the sprites were processed differently, the backgrounds are all different and the combat system is much closer to Super Street Fighter II Turbo. In addition to the regular Special Moves and Super Combos, players can also perform more powerful versions of their character's Special Moves known as "Super Special Moves". Much like the "ES Moves" featured in Night Warriors and the "EX Specials" later introduced in Street Fighter III 2nd Impact, a Super Special requires for the Super Combo gauge to be at least half-full (after the filled portion of the gauge turns blue) and can be performed by executing the same command as a regular Special Move, but pressing two attack buttons instead of one. When the Super Combo gauge is full, the player can perform an unlimited number of Super Specials until the player performs a Super Combo.

There are four game modes available. The primary single-player mode, "Movie Battle", is a story-based mode which follows the plot of the film. The player takes control of Guile, who is on a mission to infiltrate Bison's Lair in Shadaloo City. The player can choose between different branching points after certain matches, which determines the number of opponents that will be faced before the next branching point, until reaching the final matches against Sagat, Bison and Final Bison. After completing Movie Battle mode, a music video of the film's theme song "Something There" by Chage & Aska will be played.

The other modes include an arcade-style mode called "Street Battle", where the player can choose a character and then face a series of twelve computer-controlled characters, culminating with Zangief, Dee-Jay, Sagat and Bison; "Vs. Mode", a standard two-player mode like the ones in previous console versions of Street Fighter; and "Trial Mode", where the player fights against the entire roster in order to achieve a high-score or quick time record. During a battle, characters had new musical themes for this game.

== Characters ==
The home version of Street Fighter: The Movie features many of the same characters from its arcade counterpart, with a few significant differences in its roster. The original film character of Captain Sawada is featured in both versions; however, his special moves are different from the ones given to him in the arcade version. The original character Blade from the arcade game, along with the other palette swapped Bison Troopers, are not featured in the home versions. Akuma (played by Ernie Reyes Sr.), who was a regular character in the arcade game, is once again a hidden character, who is only selectable via a secret code and can only be fought as the final opponent during the Trial Mode. Two characters from the Street Fighter film who were not in the arcade version are included as well: Dee Jay (played by Miguel A. Núñez Jr.) and Blanka (played by Kim Repia).

Raúl Juliá was set to reprise his role as M. Bison for the video game version. Although he did meet with the game's staff, he was already very ill, and ultimately was unable to participate in the project, as he died in October 1994. Darko Tuscan, Julia's stunt double from the film, instead filled the role. The only other actor not to reprise his role from the film was Robert Mammone, who portrayed Blanka. Stuntman Kim Repia was brought on board to perform Blanka's complicated moveset.

== Development ==
The home version was developed and published by Capcom in Japan and released in North America and Europe by Acclaim Entertainment. Capcom also announced that an "enhanced port" was being created for the Sega 32X by their newly formed USA research and development department. This version was never released.

=== Regional differences ===
The console versions were released as Street Fighter: Real Battle on Film in Japan, to distinguish it from the unrelated Street Fighter II Movie game based on the anime film of the same title. Aside from text translations, the voice samples for characters are different between the Japanese and English versions of the game. Much like in the Japanese dub of the movie, the three Grand Masters from Street Fighter II who had their names switched between the Japanese and American versions (Balrog, Vega and M. Bison) are referred by westernized names in the Japanese version. In contrast, Akuma is referred to as Gouki in the Japanese version.

== Reception ==
Reception

Review scores
Publication	Score
AllGame	1.5/5 (SAT)
Electronic Gaming Monthly	6.5/10, 6/10, 7/10, 7/10 (SAT)
GameFan	84/100, 85/100, 82/100 (SAT)
Hyper	74% (SAT)
Next Generation	3/5 (SAT); 2/5 (PS)
PlayStation Official Magazine – UK	6/10 (PS)
Play	85% (PS)
Electric Playground	5/10 (SAT)
Maximum	1/5 (SAT)
Sega Saturn Magazine	49% (SAT)

The PlayStation version was a commercial success upon release. It sold out in retail stores within a month of its North American release in September 1995.

The game received mostly negative reviews. Reviewing the Saturn version, Radion Automatic of Sega Saturn Magazine complained of the excessive slow down, as well as the fact that the game is not a conversion of the arcade game of the same name but simply another port of Super Street Fighter II Turbo with digitized graphics. The four reviewers of Electronic Gaming Monthly highly criticized the controls but praised the FMV cinemas and gameplay mechanics. Not all of the reviewers realized that the game was not a conversion of the arcade game of the same name, leading to some confusion. GamePro gave the Saturn version a firmly negative review, a rarity for the publication at the time. The reviewer criticized the slow and choppy animation, weak battle voices, unpredictable frame redraw, and the quick recover time of fighters, saying this results in "a wait-and-strike defensive game rather than a true competitive Street Fighter match." A reviewer for Maximum particularly criticized the poor quality of the digitization and the low frame rate. He also commented that while the gameplay is basically a port of Super Street Fighter II Turbo, it is crippled by bouts of slowdown: "The fluid, instinctual response of the previous SF games seems to have been lost and with it, any real compulsion to play it." A critic for Next Generation gave the game one of its few completely positive reviews. He praised the comprehensive selection of characters and numerous modes to play in, and concluded that the game "looks and plays great."

While a different GamePro critic covered the PlayStation version, he too gave the game a resoundingly negative review, saying it has long load times, conspicuous glitches, control lag, bad voice acting, and muddy sprites which fail to resemble the actors from the film. Despite their positive review of the Saturn version, Next Generation's brief review of the PlayStation version called it "A major misstep all around."

Bob Mackey of USgamer listed Street Fighter: The Movie as one of the worst launch games for the PlayStation, noting that the game is "largely remembered for being an abject embarrassment." Retrospectively, Marissa Meli of UGO.com ranked it at number 102 in her top 102 worst games of all time list.

== Legacy ==
In October 2018, the game's Western publishing rights were acquired by Canadian production company Liquid Media Group along with other titles originally owned by Acclaim Entertainment.
