= Chun-Li =

Street Fighter character

- Street Fighter character
- Chun-Li in Marvel vs. Capcom: Clash of Super Heroes
- First game: Street Fighter II: The World Warrior (1991)
- Created by: Akira Nishitani
- Designed by: Akira Yasuda; Eri "Erichan" Nakamura (Alpha); Daigo Ikeno (SFIV)
- Voiced by: Japanese: Eri "Erichan" Nakamura (Games, 1991–1995); Yūko Miyamura (Games, 1995–2000); Atsuko Tanaka (Games, 1999–2005); Michiko Neya (Capcom vs. SNK series); Mari Jitsukawa (SVC Chaos: SNK vs. Capcom); Fumiko Orikasa (Games, 2008–present); Yumi Tōma (Street Fighter Alpha: The Movie, Street Fighter II drama CD); Chisa Yokoyama (Street Fighter II V, Street Fighter Alpha drama CD); Miki Fujitani (Street Fighter II: The Animated Movie); Rica Fukami (Japanese dub of the Street Fighter film); Riisa Naka (Japanese dub of The Legend of Chun-Li); English: Donna Yamamoto (animated series); Lia Sargent (Street Fighter II: The Animated Movie, Street Fighter II V, Animaze, Street Fighter Alpha: The Movie); Junie Hoang (Street Fighter II V, ADV #1); Tamara Lo (Street Fighter II V, ADV #2); Vanessa Prokuski (Street Fighter - Round One: Fight!); Laura Bailey (Games, 2009–2021); Ashly Burch (Marvel vs. Capcom Infinite, Teppen); Jennie Kwan (Street Fighter 6, Fatal Fury: City of the Wolves)
- Portrayed by: Various: Jackie Chan (City Hunter); Ming-Na Wen (1994 Street Fighter film, games); Kristin Kreuk (Street Fighter: The Legend of Chun-Li); Callina Liang (2026 Street Fighter film)

In-universe information
- Fighting style: Kung Fu
- Origin: China
- Nationality: Chinese

Chun-Li (/tʃʌnˈliː/; Japanese: 春麗(チュンリー), Hepburn: Chun-Lee) is a character in Capcom's Street Fighter video game series. She first appeared in Street Fighter II: The World Warrior in 1991 and is the first female playable character to appear in a fighting game to gain mainstream recognition. She is a martial artist and Interpol officer who seeks revenge for the death of her father by the series' antagonist M. Bison.

Since her debut, Chun-Li has become a pop culture icon, being widely notable beyond the games and one of the series' most iconic characters. She has appeared in nearly all subsequent installments of the series and several other Capcom games, in addition to third-party games. She is also featured in Street Fighter-related media, including two feature films, multiple anime and comic book productions, and other official series merchandise. She has earned much positive fan and critical reception for factors such as her backstory, athleticism and in-game playability, and she is considered a trailblazer for female characters in fighting titles and general video gaming.

== Development history ==
=== Design ===
Akiman's original, later (in Interpol uniform) and final concept art works for Street Fighter II. The text reads: "Our image for Chun-Li changed from the somewhat coquettish 'Chinese Girl' version (left) to the strong, gallant Chun-Li (right)."

Chun-Li's design was primarily inspired by Tong Pooh, a female villain from Strider, an earlier Capcom game. Capcom designer Akira Nishitani, recounting the creation of the character, said: "Previously there were no women in fighting games. In Chun-Li's case, I wanted a woman in the game. I determined what her fighting abilities would be. Then China just came up as a possible homeland." Capcom artist and designer Akira "Akiman" Yasuda said the initial inspiration for Chun-Li came from the 1983 anime film Harmagedon: Genma Wars (featuring early character design work by Akira creator Katsuhiro Otomo), which had a Chinese female character called Tao. Chun-Li was originally known as just 'Chinese Girl' among the development team. She had a backflip attack that was popular among testers but deemed too strong, and unfortunately had to be cut from the game after they ran out of time. Her name means 'beautiful spring' in Chinese as Chūn (春) means 'the season of spring', and lì (麗) means 'beautiful' in Mandarin dialects.

Yasuda recalled they only had five weeks to make Chun-Li in the game and he was deeply worried about the quality of her design and how she would be received. Chun-Li "was wearing pants right up until the very end [of the development]. When we made the sprites I thought she didn't look right, so I had them changed to tights instead." Akiman added that they "wanted Street Fighter II to be more entertaining than its predecessor. That also helps explain how Chun-Li came to be. Having a female character in the game completely changes the game's dynamic, she brightens up the entire palette. We needed a reason for her to fight, and so an evil empire [of M. Bison] came to mind." He also said: "To be honest, I spent some time worrying about putting Chun-Li, the heroine, into such a plain setting. Ordinarily, you don't see women participating in global martial arts tournaments. Just by adding her we were starting to push things to the 'fun' side. I didn't think about it at the time, but thinking about it now, from the moment we put Chun-Li into the game we were already pushing things towards the full-on entertainment side."

Chun-Li was designed with an exceptionally strong physique because she was the sole woman among a roster of powerful male characters in Street Fighter II. To overcome this perceived imbalance, she was devised as a character who had mastered Chinese kenpo and really pushed her body to the limit so that she could compete with such a cast of large and imposing men. She was nevertheless the fastest but physically weakest character in her first game. Capcom producer Yoshiki Okamoto said he wanted to also make the life bar for Chun-Li "shorter than for the other characters because women are not as strong. But Nishitani didn't want to do that. We both had legitimate reasons, but then we came to an agreement to not make it shorter."

Chun-Li is particularly well known for her very muscular legs, while depictions of the rest of her body are more variable. According to Capcom composer Yoko Shimomura, Chun-Li's big thighs originated from Akiman's personal fetish. The size of Chun-Li's thighs massively increased in Street Fighter III. Capcom producer Yoshinori Ono commented on the issue. "I witnessed as her thighs made a sudden jump into gigantism in SFIII. When we first put her in the game, her sprite was just an outline and her thighs weren't that big...but as the artists starting coloring her in, her legs got thicker and thicker." However, they all felt the larger legs increased the expressiveness of her animations. Regarding then-upcoming Street Fighter IV, Ono said the "character designer, [Daigo] Ikeno, is kind of into thick girls, so as an artist he feels that the most beautiful thighs he can give Chun-Li would be of the wide variety."

Chun-Li sprite's panty-flashing animation frames have been censored for the home console releases by Nintendo. In response to fans that were disappointed with Chun-Li's absence from Street Fighter III, Capcom added her to the 3rd Strike version of the game. Since her main designer, Akiman, was busy with other assignments, she was redesigned by other members from the staff; Chun Li took the most time and effort out of all the new characters. Her inclusion into Street Fighter EX was deemed natural by the studio Arika, with producer Ichiro Mihara describing her as one of the three essential Street Fighter characters along with Ryu and Ken.

In the Street Fighter Alpha games, where she was redesigned by Eri "Erichan" Nakamura, Chun-Li wears a sleeveless tight outfit, her arms and upper body were visibly much stronger than those of any other female character in the franchise. However, many artists choose to depict her as petite and slim, in official and unofficial artworks alike, drawing only her legs strong due to her emphasis on kicking moves. An early version of Chun-Li in Street Fighter IV was reworked following complaints from location tests that she was not "cute". Ono later announced Chun-Li's controversial face in Marvel vs. Capcom: Infinite would be also corrected based on a negative feedback from the fans.

=== Costumes ===
In the Street Fighter II sub-series and most of her later appearances, Chun-Li wears a usually blue qipao, an early-20th-century Chinese dress, with golden accents, puffy sleeves, and a white waistband. The dress is modified to allow a far wider range of movement than a generic qipao. In Street Fighter II: The World Warrior, Chun-Li was originally depicted wearing a red qipao instead of blue. It can be also either red or white within some games since Street Fighter II: Champion Edition and Street Fighter II: Hyper Fighting, respectively. In Marvel vs. Capcom: Infinite, the qipao has a very noticeable silky sheen. Her other ensemble includes a pair of white combat boots and brown tights. She usually wears her hair in "ox horns", with silk brocades and ribbons in her hair. Another iconic part of her design are the large spiked bracelets she wears on her wrists.

In the Street Fighter Alpha games (set during the time period before Street Fighter II), Chun-Li wears a Chinese acrobatic outfit consisting of an embroidered vest, a unitard, and sneakers; she is wearing her ox horns unadorned, but kept in place with yellow ribbons. In Street Fighter IV, Chun-Li's alternate outfit consists of black tabard with gold accents at the bottom, while her ox horns are unadorned, just like in her Alpha appearance; this time, it is held by red ropes with golden balls at the tip. This outfit is completed with red shoes, gold earrings and black and gold bracelets. Her alternative wardrobe in Super Street Fighter IV includes a costume inspired by Mai Shiranui and in Street Fighter V she has a Halloween downloadable content (DLC) appearing as Morrigan Aensland.

=== Gameplay ===
Chun-Li's gameplay style changes notably from game to game; for example, Champion Edition restored her flipping attacks that have been removed from the original version of Street Fighter II. Street Fighter III: 3rd Strike marked a strong departure from previous incarnations as it featured a large number of revamped moves. Chun-Li started as a weak and fast close-range fighter compared to the bigger male characters from Street Fighter II; she also had the best aerial ability in the game. Chun-Li steadily gained an array of different moves through the games, such as a projectile attack or an anti-air defensive move, which steered her towards a more balanced type with an emphasis on poking and control of neutral game thanks to a rich set of non-special moves of relatively long range. She has been noted to be one of the most powerful characters in the game, alongside Ken and Yun.

Street Fighter Alpha 2 and Alpha 3 feature Chun-Li's original outfit from Street Fighter II as an alternate version of the character with alternate special abilities and Super Combos. CVG opined she was "the most-improved character in Alpha 2, and possibly the #1 character in the whole game." She was considerably weakened in Street Fighter EX, but has remained one of the fastest characters. The development team for Street Fighter EX attempted to bring Chun-Li back to her roots as an agility-oriented character by, among other things, restoring her Spinning Bird Kick and removing the fireball attack she acquired in Street Fighter II Turbo as they felt the projectile attack had too radically altered her originally agile fighting style. Her appearances in the Marvel vs. Capcom series are reminiscent of her early gameplay, featuring her as one of the fastest characters in the games.

== Appearances ==
=== Video games ===
==== Street Fighter ====
Chun-Li was introduced in 1991 in the original version of Street Fighter II (Street Fighter II: The World Warrior) as the franchise's first playable female character, an undercover Interpol agent seeking to avenge the death of her father at the hands of M. Bison and his criminal organization. Chun-Li is an expert Chinese martial arts practitioner. Her profile indicates her training in several styles of Chinese kempo ("Chinese martial arts") at the age of five, especially tai chi, which she would later complement with sanda (combat wushu) and fighting styles from all around the world, such as taekwondo, full contact karate, judo and capoeira. She has been noted in-universe for her fluent English, investigating skills, penetrating eyes, beauty and acting talent for deception. Chun-Li is presented as a woman with a strong sense of justice, and her motives for fighting crime range from avenging the death of her father to protecting innocents. She especially cares for kids, showing repulse for the use of brainwashed young girls in Street Fighter Alpha 3 and the kidnapping of a girl in Street Fighter III: 3rd Strike. In the latter game, she decides she will teach her fighting style and philosophy to children. Chun-Li returns in Street Fighter IV, where her in-game narrative shows her at crossroads in her life, eventually returning to both street fighting and law enforcement. She returns in Street Fighter V, where she assists in stopping Shadaloo's Black Moons and first meets Li-Fen when she rescues her from the organization; in her prologue story, Chun-Li recalls how she learned of her father's death.

In Street Fighter 6, Chun-Li continues to raise Li-Fen and train students in Metro City's Chinatown district, while also being promoted to become a director of Interpol. Li-Fen also acts as her eyes and ears during her Interpol work. Upon learning a terrorist group known as Amnesia attempts to assassinate Ken at Nayshall, Chun-Li tries to stop them from framing him for the crime he did not commit, but fails. Chun-Li then works hard on finding further evidences to clear her friend's name while hunting the terrorist group.

==== Other games ====
Besides the core Street Fighter series, Chun-Li has also made appearances in many other Capcom-produced fighting games, including all titles of the long-running series Marvel vs. Capcom (ever since X-Men vs. Street Fighter, including Shadow Lady, a dark version of Chun-Li that underwent harsh experiments on Bison's orders and was transformed into a brainwashed cyborg, Capcom vs. SNK, Tatsunoko vs. Capcom, and Street Fighter X Tekken. She and Ryu are the only Street Fighter characters to appear in every Capcom crossover title, including the SNK vs. Capcom fighting game series by SNK and the tactical role-playing games Namco × Capcom, Project X Zone and Project X Zone 2 by Namco (where Chun-Li is paired into a single unit with Morrigan Aensland from Darkstalkers), as well as appearing as a boss in the platform game Street Fighter X Mega Man. She was also planned to appear as a giant robot in Cyberbots. Often, Chun-Li either continues her existing story from Street Fighter II or seeks to arrest the other characters in the game that she sees as suspicious.

Chun-Li is additionally playable in other Capcom games such as versus puzzle games Super Puzzle Fighter II Turbo, Super Gem Fighter Mini Mix (where she can turn into Jill Valentine) and Street Fighter: Puzzle Spirits, and social games Capcom All-Stars and Street Fighter Battle Combination. She has made guest appearances in a number of mobile games, including #Compass, Destiny Child, Granblue Fantasy, Power Rangers: Legacy Wars, and Valkyrie Connect. She makes cameo appearances in various Capcom games including Asura's Wrath, Breath of Fire, Final Fight 2, Mega Man 9, and We Love Golf!. Furthermore, her costumes can be worn by player characters in Capcom's Breath of Fire 6, Dead Rising 3 (a DLC costume for Frank West), Monster Hunter: World, Monster Hunter Explore, and Onimusha: Dawn of Dreams (as an alternate costume for Ohatsu), as well as in Square Enix's Gunslinger Stratos 2 (a costume for Mika Katagiri) and Sony's LittleBigPlanet (a DLC for Sackgirl). A playable Chun-Li character skin has also been added to Fortnite. Chun-Li, under the name "Blue Phoenix Ranger", appears as a playable character in Power Rangers: Battle for the Grid via downloadable content. Chun-Li is set to appear in Fatal Fury: City of the Wolves as part of the first season of downloadable content. Chun-Li was introduced to Call of Duty: Mobile in December 2025 as a part of an official collaboration COD:M and Street Fighter 6. She appears in the game as “Shadowfall – Chun-Li” legendary character skin.

=== Other appearances ===
==== Live-action ====
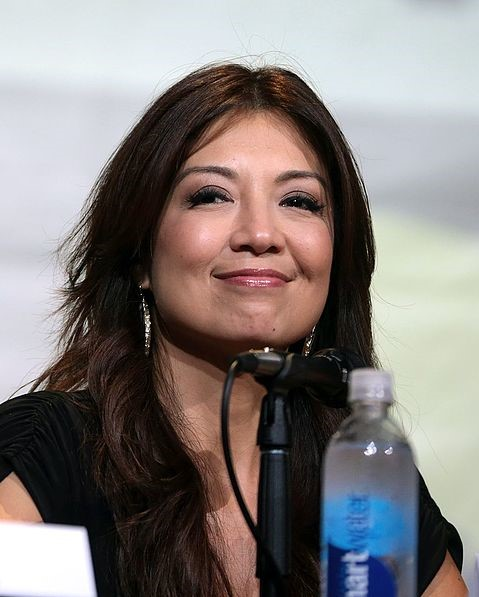
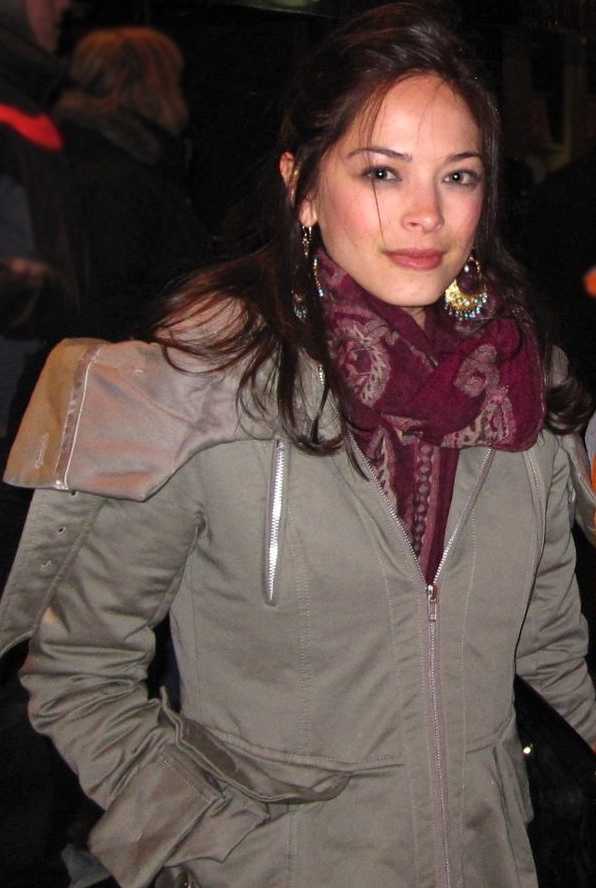
Chun-Li was portrayed by Ming-Na Wen (left) in 1994's Street Fighter film and related games, while Kristin Kreuk (right) portrayed her in 2009's Street Fighter: The Legend of Chun-Li.

Jackie Chan played a parody version of the character in Wong Jing's live-action adaptation of City Hunter in 1993. Both Chingmy Yau and Kingdom Yuen played a mother-daughter team of Chun-Lis in the final action set piece of Wong's parody film Future Cops.

Chun-Li was a central character in the 1994 Street Fighter film, played by Ming-Na Wen. Chun-Li was given a surname ("Zang Chun-Li") and posed as a television reporter working in Shadaloo in her personal quest to track down and kill Bison, who had murdered her father during a peasant uprising. Her relationship with Guile is acrimonious from the start, as he bluntly rejects her interview request and chides Chun-Li for his own inability to trace a signal broadcast by Bison. Chun-Li allies herself with E. Honda and Balrog, who work as her news crew and whose reputations were ruined by Bison's mafia connections, and later forms an initially uneasy alliance with Ryu and Ken working with Guile in attempting to locate Bison's secret fortress.

As the titular character in the 2009 film Street Fighter: The Legend of Chun-Li, she was played by Kristin Kreuk, given a new surname ("Chun-Li Xiang") as well as being a pianist turned fighter. Her father was named Huang Xiang and was a businessman Bison abducts and forces to work for him. While she was depicted as Chinese-American, her goal of avenging her father remained unchanged and she succeeds killing Bison with help from her mentor Gen and Charlie Nash. The film was released in Japanese theaters as a double bill with a Studio 4°C-produced anime short that starred fellow Street Fighter character Sakura Kasugano and played after the movie.

Chun-Li was planned to appear in the second season of Street Fighter: Assassin's Fist titled Street Fighter: World Warrior in a significant role.

Gemma Nguyen portrays Chun-Li in the official crossover between the Power Rangers and Street Fighter titled Power Rangers: Legacy Wars—Street Fighter Showdown. In the short, Ryu morphs into the RyuRanger and Chun-Li teams with Tommy Oliver, Ninjor and Gia Moran to battle M. Bison and evil Power Rangers. Nguyen reprised her role in the fan film Street Fighter: Enter the Dragon, intervening in the fight between Fei Long and Balrog near the end.

Callina Liang portrayed Chun-Li in Kitao Sakurai's live-action adaptation.

==== Animation ====
Chun-Li is a central character in the 1994 anime film Street Fighter II: The Animated Movie, voiced by Miki Fujitani in the original Japanese version and by Lia Sargent (credited as Mary Briscoe) in the English dub. She is investigating M. Bison's Shadowlaw organization suspected of murdering several diplomats and requests to work with Guile; he initially balks at this as he wants to pursue Bison himself, but later they become inseparable. In a famous instance of fan service, an explicit scene showed Chun-Li showering in her apartment as a Shadowlaw assassin, Vega, arrives to kill her. The shower scene has been censored to varying degrees in versions of the English dub. After a brutal fight, Vega is kicked through a wall and sent plummeting several stories to the ground, but Chun-Li succumbs to her injuries and slips into a coma until her recovery in the ending.

Chun-Li is a regular character in the 1996 American animated series Street Fighter, voiced by Donna Yamamoto. The character reprises her film role as a reporter while she again seeks to avenge her father's death at the hands of Bison, which is shown in flashback in the second episode, "The Strongest Woman in the World". In the 1997–1998 anime series Street Fighter II V, Chun-Li is voiced by Chisa Yokoyama in the original Japanese version, while Lia Sargent reprises her role in the English dub. Chun-Li is introduced as the 15-year-old daughter of Inspector Do-Rai, a Hong Kong police chief who has schooled her in the martial arts. While attempting to bring down a drug smuggling operation in the country, she works with Interpol to investigate a mysterious organization known as Shadowlaw. Chun-Li serves as the tour guide for Ryu and Ken when they pay a visit to work on their training.

Chun-Li appears in the 1999 anime OVA Street Fighter Alpha: The Animation, voiced by Yumi Tōma in the original Japanese version and again by Lia Sargent in the English dub. There, she is as an Interpol agent who investigates a mad scientist called Sadler who works for Shadaloo. She believes the trail can lead her to her father, who at the time, was missing and presumed alive. She assists Ryu and Ken in finding a kidnapped boy named Shun who claims to be Ryu's younger brother. While tracking Sadler, she accompanies multiple fighters to Sadler's hideout She and Ken rescue the other fighters and end up in a tussle with Sadler's android enforcer, Rosanov, who beats them severely. Ryu ultimately manages to destroy both Rosanov and Sadler.

In the season 6 (2010) Halloween special of the cartoon series American Dad!, Toshi's little sister Akiko goes trick-or-treating as Chun-Li. Chun-Li made cameo appearances in the animated films Wreck-It Ralph and Ralph Breaks the Internet alongside several fellow Street Fighter characters.

==== Comics ====
In the 1990s Street Fighter II manga by Masaomi Kanzaki, Chun-Li remains in her established role of an Interpol agent investigating Bison. As the story progresses, Chun-Li participates in a tournament arranged by Shadaloo, eventually coming up against Vega, portrayed here as her father's killer. She defeats him but is so exhausted that she pulls out from the tournament and her injuries prevent her from doing much when Ryu and Bison confront one another.

Chun-Li also appears in Masahiko Nakahira's 1996–1997 manga Street Fighter: Sakura Ganbaru!, in which she participates in a police raid to an illegal underground fighting circle, saving Sakura from human traffickers who operated in the place. Later on, she follows the trails that lead her to an assassin which turns out to be Gen, from whom she suffers an utter defeat. She is last seen in Russia, parting ways with Sakura and Dan, with Cammy under her care. In the manga adaptations of Street Fighter Alpha, Chun-Li is again an agent of the Interpol. She encounters Ryu, who has fallen from grace and had hired himself out as a bodyguard to drug smugglers, and winds up befriending him and Birdie as well as Ken, also rescuing Cammy from being captured by Sodom. Shadaloo is once again responsible for the death of her father, though the exact identity of the killer is not revealed.

In Malibu Comics' short-lived Street Fighter series, Chun-Li is depicted as having known Ryu and Ken since her late teens, as well as having a romantic interest in Ryu, though both make their first appearances therein fighting each other after he sneaks up on her from behind. Chun-Li is also one of several Street Fighter characters featured in Archie Comics' Worlds Unite event, which saw several Capcom and Sega franchises crossover in the Sonic the Hedgehog, Sonic Universe, Mega Man, and Sonic Boom comic lines.

In UDON's Street Fighter comics, Chun-Li is involved in the hunt for Bison and Shadaloo. However, in the comic, the killer of Chun-Li's father is Cammy, prior to her being freed from Bison's control. Chun-Li battles Cammy when they meet face to face for the first time and ultimately forgives Cammy and turns her sights on Bison himself. Eventually, she receives an invitation from Shadaloo to enter a tournament being held by Bison. In 2008, UDON also released a four-issue special miniseries Street Fighter Legends: Chun-Li, which focuses on a younger Chun-Li and one of her first assignments for the Hong Kong police. She is working with her partner Po-Lin, a young policewoman who has a very personal score to settle with Shadaloo. In the Street Fighter vs. Darkstalkers crossover series, she is a rival turned and uneasy ally of Morrigan.

== Promotion and merchandise ==
There have been multiple Chun-Li lookalike contests in Japan, United States and elsewhere during the early 1990s, with valuable main prizes such as the Nissan 300ZX or the Honda CR-X. Later such contests have been performed on a much smaller scale. Chun-Li's character was used to promote the film Ready Player One in Japan. In 2018, Japanese company Onitsuka Tiger collaborated with Capcom for Chun-Li to wear their new Mexico 66 SD line of sports shoes, and the 30th anniversary of Street Fighter collaboration between Capcom and Japan's Saga Prefecture featured singer and actress Kayo Noro dressed as Chun-Li. Previously, actress Miki Mizuno also dressed as Chun-Li in another promotional event as did pop singer Maki Miyamae to perform Chun-Li's official song on the television. In 1997, actress and pop star Rie Tomosaka played Chun-Li on television as well.

A wide variety of Chun-Li figures have been produced by various manufacturers, including by Capcom itself, Ace Novelty, BigBoysToys, Funko, Kotobukiya, Pop Culture Shock Collectibles, S.H. Figuart, SOTA Toys, Storm Collectibles, Takara Tomy, and Tsume-Art, among many others. Artworks of her were also featured on an officially licensed animated NubyTech/UDON joypad for the PlayStation 2, and a Mad Catz wireless joypad for the PlayStation 3 and Xbox 360. Other assorted merchandise included Diesel sneakers, women's lingerie, a figure-style flash drive USB stick, a postage stamp from Japanese Philatelic Association came with its own collectible figure, and a figurine that came with a DyDo drink. There are also Chun-Li themed pachinko slot games such as Chun-Li Ni Makase China!, which also marked her first starring role in a game.

== Cultural impact ==
Cited as the first playable female fighting game character, Chun-Li was positively received since her debut, dubbed the "first lady of fighting games" and the "original videogame super-babe". The staff of GamePro called her the most iconic character of Street Fighter II and "everyone's favorite feminine fighter". Her return in Street Fighter III: Third Strike was also heavily praised and seen as the best addition to the series. Meanwhile, the creation of Street Fighter II: Champion Edition was inspired by Capcom employee Jeff Walker witnessing an argument between two girls over which one of them would play as Chun-Li, with Walker suggesting to make a version that allowed both players to play the same character.

Xbox 360 Official Magazine – Australia cited her and Nintendo character Samus Aran as examples of gaming's original sex symbols prior to the advent of Lara Croft According to the Smithsonian Museum's Chris Mellisinos, Chun-Li "was such an anomaly" due to the fact she was a strong female character in an arcade environment, adding that she was "drawn attractively, just like Ken and Ryu, but in no way was she a diminished character because she was female." Video game scholar Jennifer deWinter felt it was furthermore very "interesting and surprising to have such a strong Chinese character in Chun-Li coming out of a Japanese game." The character has also been cited as a popular subject of cosplay, with several idols and female bodybuilders dressing as the character.

Her character arcs have also received significant discussion. Author Gladys L. Knight in the book Female Action Heroes appreciated the revenge aspect of her character, and noted that while Legend of Chun-Li had been panned as a film it was the one media adaptation of her story that emphasized her in a primary role, with both the anime and first live-action film putting her in the role of a supporting character, especially the former. Author Nicholas Ware meanwhile in his dissertation titled You Must Defeat Sheng Long to Stand a Chance stated that while her story had remained consistent throughout Street Fighter II, he felt it had been usurped later in the series with the character Akuma being established as the one to kill Bison. Kevin Wong in an article for Kotaku praised how her character had evolved by the time of Street Fighter 6, considering it the best version of her character as it now presented as a teacher and living a life of peace and fulfilling the ending presented for her in the original Street Fighter II.

=== Analysis ===
Knight in her book described her as combining "brutal power, girliness, and sex appeal", and emphasized that while the character was known for her protruding thighs she also featured large breasts and a small waist, things she considered trademarks of female characters geared to appeal to male fantasies. However, at the same time she felt Chun-Li was also emphasized as youthful as well as an unconventional, powerful fighter through elements of her character design. Knight further stated Chun-Li transgressed "the pattern of the typical 1980s action woman" and reflected elements of third wave feminism by combining femininity and masculine toughness, using an emphasis of being sexually appealing as a source of strength. Knight also pointed out while muscular women were not a new concept in media, "her unusually large musculature unequivocally established her equality in terms of power" and served as a deviation from how one expected female characters to look. In combining these aspects, Knight felt Chun-Li not only helped change the view of female characters in video games, but also helped pave the way for other strong female leading women such as Lara Croft.

University of Wisconsin professor Bryan J. Carr for the book 100 Greatest Video Game Characters stated that Chun-Li acted as "a fundamental touchpoint in the aesthetic and ludic representation" of women in video games. While Carr pointed out she was designed around many of the same manner of cultural stereotype emphasis as other characters, unlike her male counterparts she was also intended to be shorter, faster and in Street Fighter II weaker than her male counterparts. He felt this helped define the representation of female characters going forward in video games, as many often shared these same traits afterward. Carr also observed that while her musculature and exposed legs were emphasized for the male gaze, they also made her unique in that they served to give her agency through her strength as well, a dichotomy further illustrated by Yasuda and Nishimura's stated efforts to retain cuteness and femininity in their art of her.

=== Legacy ===
British academic and author Esther MacCallum-Stewart in a paper titled Real Boys Carry Girly Epics citing the character as having a lasting impact on fighting games and the beat 'em-up genre, particularly in how such games often featured at least one female character afterward. She further felt that characters such as Dead or Alive's Leifang, Tekken's Ling Xiaoyu, and Virtua Fighter's Pai Chan were all directly descended from Chun-Li conceptually due to similarities in their designs. Media outlets have compared other characters to Chun-Li in this manner including Real Bout Fatal Fury 2's Li Xiang Fei, Fighter's History's Liu Feilin, Double Dragon V's Sekka, Golden Axe: The Duel's Jamm, and Raging Fighter's Miyabi.

Other outlets meanwhile compared Chun-Li to SNK character Mai Shiranui, as both have been cited as the first two prominent female characters of fighting games. Frederick Badlissi of Diehard GameFan jokingly called it the "question of 'anatomic supremacy' between Mai Shiranui’s breasts (the 'North') and Chun-Li’s thighs (the 'South')". Games Tribune Magazine writer Javier Bello felt the comparison was in part due to the visual appeal of both characters introducing "a sexy and pleasing touch to the eye" in contrast to a cast of "squads of fighters with plenty of testosterone and muscles", with Mai's emphasis on exposure pushing her popularity further in his opinion. French magazine Hardcore Gamers devoted a two-page spread to the characters to compare them, with the article emphasizing while Chun-Li was often the more interesting character, Mai was more consistently alluring, though no less influential on other characters in the fighting game industry.

The character has also been homaged in film, such as by Jackie Chan in the 1993 film City Hunter where Chan's character is briefly changed into Chun-Li, mirroring her Street Fighter II design. The 1992 film Hong Kong film Super Cop starring Cynthia Khan meanwhile referenced her directly by having the lead character be named Chun Li, while also utilizing several of her attacks such as the Spinning Bird Kick. In addition, she also makes cameo appearances in the 2008 Korean film My Mighty Princess and in the 2018 film Ready Player One.
