= Street Fighter II: The Animated Movie =

1994 anime film

- Theatrical release poster

Japanese name
- Japanese: ストリートファイターII MOVIE
- Literal meaning: Street Fighter II Movie
Transcriptions
- Revised Hepburn: Sutorīto Faitā Tsū Mūbī
- Directed by: Gisaburō Sugii
- Screenplay by: Kenichi Imai; Gisaburō Sugii
- Based on: Street Fighter II by Capcom
- Produced by: Kenichi Imai
- Starring: Kojiro Shimizu; Kenji Haga; Miki Fujitani; Masane Tsukayama; Takeshi Kusaka
- Cinematography: Hiroaki Edamitsu
- Edited by: Masashi Furukawa
- Music by: Tetsuya Komuro; Yuji Toriyama
- Production companies: Capcom; Group TAC; SEDIC; Sony Music Entertainment Japan
- Distributed by: Capcom
- Release dates: August 6, 1994 (Japan); January 16, 1996 (United States)
- Running time: 102 minutes
- Countries: Japan; United States
- Languages: Japanese; English
- Budget: $6 million
- Box office: $29 million

Street Fighter II: The Animated Movie, known as Street Fighter II Movie (ストリートファイターII MOVIE, Sutorīto Faitā Tsū Mūbī) in Japan, is a 1994 martial arts action-adventure anime that is a video game-based OVA adaptation of the "Super" editions of Street Fighter II, directed by Gisaburō Sugii, written by Kenichi Imai and animated by Group TAC and featuring character designs by Shuko Murase.

Street Fighter II: The Animated Movie was the first fully animated film in the Street Fighter franchise, distributed by Capcom in Japan. The film, originally released in Japan on August 6, 1994, was released theatrically in the United States, United Kingdom, Australia, France, and Spain, and was adapted into English in dubbed and subtitled format by Animaze for Manga Entertainment. In the film, a group of professional fighters become aware of a conspiracy set by Shadaloo (referred to as Shadowlaw in the English dub), a criminal organization seeking world domination. Meanwhile, Ryu, unaware of the whole ordeal, seeks to test his skills across the world.

The film was a critical and commercial success. Group TAC later produced a more loose adaptation of Super Street Fighter II Turbo, the anime series Street Fighter II V. Though unrelated to the film, a handful of Animaze voice actors reprised their roles for their English dub of the series, produced after ADV Films's dub.

== Plot ==
Japanese martial artist Ryu and Muay Thai champion Sagat engage in a heated battle until Ryu severely scars Sagat across the chest using the Shoryuken. Enraged, Sagat charges at Ryu, but Ryu defeats him using the Hadouken, and Sagat vows revenge.

Several years later, following the assassination of a Justice Minister by Cammy White, a hypnotized MI6 agent, Interpol agent Chun-Li suggests that they join forces with the United States Military to destroy the enigmatic crime syndicate Shadowlaw. Captain Guile, who seeks revenge against Shadowlaw's leader, M. Bison, for the death of his best friend Charlie, initially refuses, but eventually relents after Chun-Li tells him that Bison killed her father years earlier and she also seeks revenge, but knows that her duty comes first. At the Shadowlaw base, Bison, along with his bodyguards Balrog, Vega, and Sagat, orders a worldwide manhunt for Ryu, determined to induct him into his organization, and sends out monitor cyborgs to find more valuable martial artists for their cause. However, Ryu, who is traveling the world to seek out worthy challengers, such as Fei Long, Dhalsim, and E. Honda, remains undetected due to suppressing his Ki.

Meanwhile, Ryu's American best friend and fighting rival, Ken Masters, has settled down with his girlfriend, Eliza, but still seeks challenge and a rematch with Ryu. During a fight with T. Hawk, who had sought out Ken to challenge him, a monitor cyborg witnesses Ken and the footage of the fight is sent to the Shadowlaw base. After seeing the footage and learning of Ken's history with Ryu, Bison decides to hunt him down and hypnotize him instead. Along the way, Bison sees Chun-Li and Guile warning Dee Jay about the monitor cyborgs, and subsequently sends Vega to New York to kill Chun-Li. Vega ambushes Chun-Li in her high-rise apartment, but after a long fight, Chun-Li defeats Vega by kicking him through her apartment wall to his apparent death, but she falls into a coma as a result of her injuries. Guile rushes her to the hospital while learning of Ryu and Ken from Interpol. After discovering that Bison has captured Ken, Guile rushes to Thailand to warn Ryu, who is training in the mountains with E. Honda.

Bison, however, follows Guile and confronts them. He sets the hypnotized Ken on Ryu, who initially refuses to fight back. Honda battles Balrog while Guile faces Bison and is severely beaten, though Bison spares his life as an insult. As Ryu prepares to retaliate against Ken, memories of their past enable him to break free from Bison's mind control. The enraged Bison unleashes his Psycho Power upon Ken before turning his attention to Ryu, who fights him with very little success. Ken uses his master's Ki teachings to mend his body and joins the fight. Together, Ryu and Ken defeat Bison, apparently destroying him. Honda defeats Balrog and rescues Guile. Shortly afterwards, the United States Military locates and destroys the entrance to Bison's base, presumably arresting all of Bison's subordinates and bringing down Shadowlaw.

Chun-Li recovers and reunites with Guile in the hospital, informing him that their mission was a success. Elsewhere, Ryu and Ken part ways once more and Ryu begins his journey anew. However, he is ambushed by a truck whose driver is revealed to be Bison, who survived the battle. Ryu leaps towards the truck to fight Bison again.

== Voice cast ==
Character	Japanese voice actor	English dubbing actor
Ryu	Kojiro Shimizu	Hank Smith
Ken	Kenji Haga	Ted Richards
Chun-Li	Miki Fujitani	Mary Briscoe
Guile	Masane Tsukayama	Donald Lee
Fei Long	Masakatsu Funaki	Bryan Cranston
Dee Jay	Ginzō Matsuo	John Hammond
T. Hawk	Shōzō Iizuka	Richard Cardona
Cammy	Yōko Sasaki	S. J. Charvin
E. Honda	Daisuke Gōri	Patrick Gilbert
Dhalsim	Yukimasa Kishino	Don Carey
Blanka	Unshō Ishizuka	Tom Carlton
Zangief	Tetsuo Kanao	William Johnson
Senoh	Chikao Ohtsuka	Murry Williams
Vega (Balrog in Japan)	Kaneto Shiozawa	Steve Davis
Sagat	Shigezō Sasaoka	David Conrad
Balrog (M. Bison in Japan)	Jouji Nakata	Joe Michaels
Eliza	Hiromi Tsuru	Toni Burke
Ryu and Ken's sensei (Note: While the identity of Ryu and Ken's sensei was later established to be Gouken in the games, the character's name is never mentioned in the film. When Bison compares Ryu and Ken's personal history on a monitor, the sensei's name is listed as "Goutetsu", which is the name that ended up being used for Gouken's predecessor.)	Hideyo Amamoto	George Celik
M. Bison (Vega in Japan)	Takeshi Kusaka	Phil Matthews

== Production ==
The film was formally announced by Capcom Japan at a Street Fighter II Turbo tournament held at the Ryōgoku Kokugikan on August 19, 1993. Capcom produced the film on a budget of $6 million. The fight sequences of the film were choreographed by K-1 founder Kazuyoshi Ishii and professional fighter Andy Hug. Kusanagi, Madhouse Studios and Studio Fuga did the background arts for the film.

Initially, Masashi Ikeda was announced as the director, but due to various circumstances, he was dropped out and replaced by Gisaburo Sugii. The film was completed in six months. Sugii gathers three times the usual number of staff, divides them into three groups, and continues production of the movie by making three 30-minute anime in six months and connecting them to make a 90-minute movie.

== English versions ==
=== 1995 home video version ===
Two English dubbed versions were released directly to VHS and LaserDisc in 1995 by SMV Enterprises in North America: a tamer PG-13 version, and an unrated cut which contains, among other things, a slightly more revealing shower scene featuring Chun-Li that is still censored from the original Japanese version. The film was released in the United Kingdom by Manga Entertainment UK under license from Capcom. Manga's UK release is censored in a similar way to the US version, yet profanity is retained and is rated 15 by the BBFC. Manga's Australian release is entirely uncut and is rated M by the ACB. In addition, a slightly different version of the film appears in both the PlayStation 2 and Xbox versions of the Street Fighter Anniversary Collection as a bonus feature accessible from Hyper Street Fighter II's Gallery Mode. It is more censored than the PG-13 version in terms of language, and contains some other minor edits not related to mature or vulgar content. The American VHS releases and the version in the North American Street Fighter Anniversary Collection were pan and scan while the Region 1 DVD has non-anamorphic widescreen. The European VHS version is non-anamorphic widescreen. These localized English versions replaced the original Japanese soundtrack in favor of licensed popular alternative Western soundtracks from KMFDM, Korn, Alice in Chains, Silverchair, Intermix, and other bands, as well an instrumental score.

=== 2006 DVD version ===
An Uncut, Uncensored, Unleashed DVD version of the film was released in North America on July 18, 2006, and addresses the complaints made about the censored English versions of the film in 1995. Unlike the previous unrated version released in the US, which was still censored, this release is uncut from the original Japanese version and, for the first time (for non-Japanese releases of the film), contains the original Japanese soundtrack in addition to the English soundtrack (both featuring a new Dolby Digital 5.1 mix). It is a double-sided DVD, with one side containing the English dub with the English soundtrack and the other side containing the original Japanese voices with the original Japanese soundtrack with optional English subtitles.

The video on the English and Japanese sides differ, though, with the Japanese side having a new, higher quality transfer from the original Japanese master. Like the original Japanese release and the UK release, the film is presented in 1.85:1 non-anamorphic widescreen. The addition of Chun-Li's shower scene and a longer credit roll also makes the Japanese cut of the film longer by three minutes. The dubbed US and UK versions are still slightly cut. The English dubbed version has two instances of the word "fuck" in it.

Prior to the 2016 Discotek release, the Australian release by Manga and Madman Entertainment was the only version of the film to date on either DVD or Blu-ray that is completely uncut outside Japan. At the time, Madman were not satisfied with the quality of any of the video masters available and instead created their own, using a transfer sourced from the original Japanese LaserDisc and applying both IVTC and DNR. The English dub on the disc is the original dub recorded by Manga Entertainment and Animaze, free from any editing of profanity and both English and Japanese dubs have been remixed into 5.1 audio. Easter eggs on the DVD contain three Japanese trailers for the film as well as making available a version of the film with the Japanese credits. The aspect ratio of the Australian release is an anamorphic 1.77:1.

=== Netflix ===
As part of their 2008 deal with Starz Entertainment, Netflix made the film available for streaming. As of 2022, it is no longer available.

=== Street Fighter Anniversary Collector's box ===
A Blu-ray release was included with the Street Fighter Anniversary Collector's box set, which was released on September 18, 2012. However, the film is presented in standard definition and contains no nudity.

=== 2013 Kaze release ===
The film was released with a fresh 16:9 1080p transfer on Blu-ray and as a DVD/Blu combo set in 2013 by Kaze in France with the standalone Blu-ray being distributed in the United Kingdom by Manga UK. The release uses stereo audio tracks of the original Japanese track, a French one, and a heavily censored English dub based on the PG-13 cut. (thus lacking the 5.1 mixes included with the 2006 release) but features the full uncut video including the Chun-Li shower scene intact. It has optional English and French subtitles and the aspect ratio is 1.85:1.

=== 2016 Discotek release ===
In October 2016, Discotek Media released a new 16:9 1080p transfer on Blu-ray with fully uncut footage and various English and Japanese audio tracks, including the rare unrated English dub mixed with the Japanese soundtrack. It has optional newly translated English subtitles and the aspect ratio is 1.85:1. An anamorphic DVD with similar features was also released by Discotek. On August 31, 2023, Discotek announced an upcoming 4K UHD Blu-ray release of the film. This release of the film was released on November 28, 2023.

== Reception ==
At the Japanese box office, the film grossed more than $16 million, becoming one of 1994's top five highest-grossing films in Japan. It earned a distributor rental income of ¥700 million in Japan. Adjusted for inflation, its Japanese gross is equivalent to approximately $35 million. In the United States, the home video release sold close to 500,000 copies of two versions, Unrated and PG-13. One of these versions sold 200,000 copies in the United States. The film has an 80% rating on Rotten Tomatoes based on reviews from 5 critics.

The film's Japanese theme song "Itoshisa to Setsunasa to Kokoro Zuyosa to" by Ryōko Shinohara sold 2.021 million units in Japan.

== Related media ==
=== Video game ===
Japanese PlayStation cover art

Street Fighter II Movie (ストリートファイターIIムービー), a video game adaptation of the film, was released by Capcom exclusively in Japan for the PlayStation on December 15, 1995, and the Sega Saturn on March 15, 1996. It was shown at the 1995 Electronic Entertainment Expo under the title of Street Fighter II: The Interactive Movie, likely to avoid confusion with Street Fighter: The Movie, a console game tie-in to the live-action Street Fighter film that was also shown at the same trade show. A 3DO version was also announced, but never released. The game consists of footage from the film mixed with newly animated footage by Group TAC created specifically for the game (including the opening video).

The player assumes the role of Shadowlaw's new combat-capable monitor cyborg and must raise its capabilities by analyzing the fighting techniques of martial artists around the world until reaching the unit's full potential. This is achieved by observing footage from the movie and clicking at points of interests with the on-screen cursor during search mode. For example, clicking on a character's kicks during a fight scene will raise the Cyborg's leg strength . The player has a limited amount of time to analyze their surrounding on each stage as much as possible in order to gather the most data and even view new scenes drawn specifically for the game.

At the end of the game, the Cyborg must engage in a one-on-one battle against Ryu. The battle uses the same system as Super Street Fighter II Turbo, complete with a Super Combo gauge, with the Cyborg having the same techniques as Ken from that game.

Progress can be loaded through the use of pass codes in the absence of a memory card or backup. There's also a mock battle mode, in which the Cyborg can train using the skills it has acquired against a holographic projection of Ryu that can be controlled by the CPU or a second Cyborg controlled by another human player, as well as a material display mode featuring concept art and data on the film's cast of characters.

=== Manga ===
A manga adaptation of the film, Eiga Gensaku Street Fighter II (映画原作 ストリートファイターII), illustrated by Takayuki Sakai was serialized in Shogakukan's Bessatsu CoroCoro Comic manga anthology magazine and collected in a tankōbon under the Tentōmushi Comics Special imprint on August 1994. An English translation of this manga was published by Viz Communications as a six-issue limited series under the title of Street Fighter II: The Animated Movie – Official Comic Adaptation, released monthly from August 1995 to February 1996 with mirrored and retouched artwork per the manga localization standards of the time.

== Legacy ==
Elements of Street Fighter II: The Animated Movie were incorporated into subsequent games in the Street Fighter series. The grassy battlefield featured in the film's opening confrontation between Ryu and Sagat was recreated in Street Fighter Alpha 2. The location subsequently returned as the "Field of Fate" stage in Street Fighter V in 2019.

The film also influenced later adaptations of the franchise. Christian Howard, co-writer and actor of the 2014 live-action web series Street Fighter: Assassin's Fist, credited the animated film's characterisations of Ryu and Ken and its flashback sequences as influences on his writing for the series. The series' director and co-writer, Joey Ansah, also identified the film as one of the animated adaptations revisited during the project's development.

In 2017, Capcom announced that the film's Japanese theme song, "Itoshisa to Setsunasa to Kokoro Zuyosa to", originally performed by Ryōko Shinohara, would be reused as the Japanese theme for the Street Fighter franchise's 30th anniversary.

== See also ==
- Street Fighter Alpha: The Animation
- Street Fighter Alpha: Generations
