= Guile (Street Fighter) =

Street Fighter character

- Street Fighter character
- Guile in Super Street Fighter II (art by Bengus)
- First appearance: Street Fighter II: The World Warrior (1991)
- Created by: Akira "Akiman" Yasuda
- Voiced by: English: Kirk Thornton (Street Fighter II: The Animated Movie, Street Fighter II V, Animaze dub); Rob Mungle (Street Fighter II V, ADV dub); Michael Donovan (TV series); Travis Willingham (SFIV, SFxT, SFV, SSBU); Ray Chase (SF6); Lucien Dodge (Hi Score Girl); Japanese: Tesshō Genda (SF EX series, Street Fighter II V); Toshihide Tsuchiya (SFA3, MvC2); Unshō Ishizuka (CvS series, Capcom Fighting Jam); Takenosuke Nishikawa (SNK vs. Capcom: SVC Chaos); Hiroki Yasumoto (SFIV, SFxT, SFV, SSBU, Hi Score Girl, SF6); Masane Tsukayama (Street Fighter II: The Animated Movie); Hideyuki Tanaka (Japanese television dub of the Street Fighter film); Hōchū Ōtsuka (Japanese video and DVD dub of the Street Fighter film); Norio Wakamoto (Street Fighter II: Mad Revenger); Shin-ichiro Miki (Real Battle on Film)
- Portrayed by: Jean-Claude Van Damme (1994 Street Fighter film, game); Cody Rhodes (2026 Street Fighter film)

In-universe information
- Fighting style: Kickboxing, Wrestling
- Origin: United States
- Nationality: American

Guile (Japanese: ガイル, Hepburn: Gairu) is a fictional character from Capcom's Street Fighter series of fighting games. He debuted as one of the original eight World Warriors in 1991's Street Fighter II and returned in the game's subsequent updates and sequels. In the games he is portrayed as a pilot in the United States Air Force who is seeking to avenge the death of his Air Force buddy Charlie at the hands of the villainous dictator M. Bison. He started out as a major of the Air Force, until he is promoted to a colonel rank in Street Fighter V.

One of the most popular characters in the series, Guile has appeared in other Street Fighter games, including the home port versions of Street Fighter Alpha 3 (where he is a playable character alongside Charlie), and Street Fighter IV. He is also a playable character in various spin-off titles, such as the Street Fighter EX, Marvel vs. Capcom 2, and SNK vs. Capcom series.

Guile has also appeared in other Street Fighter media: the protagonist in the 1994 live-action Street Fighter film and its animated spin-off as William F. Guile, as well as one of the main characters in Street Fighter II: The Animated Movie. The character has also been featured in various official comics and merchandise. His music theme, known simply as "Guile's Theme", has been used multiple times, usually to give a sense of victory.

Guile has been perceived as unique among Street Fighter II characters in both appearance and gameplay. He is noted as having only two signature moves in the game, both of which are performed by first holding a direction on the joystick and then pushing in the opposite direction with a punch or kick - the Sonic Boom and the Flash Kick, respectively. Guile has been well received, with the character often placing highly in various lists of the best Street Fighter characters of all time.

== Conception and design ==
Early Street Fighter II sketches and notes suggest that Guile was developed specifically to appeal to American fans. In an interview with Game On!, Capcom Research and Design head Noritaka Funamizu stated that of the more popular characters in the series with western audiences, Guile was most likely considered the game's main character. Guile's design and hairstyle is based on Rudol von Stroheim and Jean-Pierre Polnareff, characters from the manga JoJo's Bizarre Adventure. Guile's name is not a reference to The J. Geils Band; however, his name references a character in JoJo's Bizarre Adventure named after The J. Geils Band.

== Appearances ==
=== In video games ===
Guile was first introduced in Street Fighter II (1991) as one of the eight selectable characters featured in the first release of the game. The former elite SOF teammate from the United States, Guile along with his best friend and co-pilot Charlie Nash were missing in action during a mission in Shadaloo. In his ending, he defeats Bison and lifts him on his knees by his throat to finish him off just after reminding him of who he murdered, but is dissuaded from killing him by his wife Julia (Jane in Japan) and their daughter Amy (Chris in Japan and Street Fighter 6), he then spares the bruised and bloody Bison and returns to his country to spend time with his family. Guile returns in console versions of Street Fighter Alpha 3 (1998) as an Air Force JTAC ordered to track down Charlie, who has gone missing. In his ending, Charlie holds off Bison while Guile escapes and the base explodes with Charlie still in it, resulting in his death.

Guile also appears as a playable character in Street Fighter EX (1997) and its two sequels, Street Fighter EX2 (1998) and Street Fighter EX3 (2000). His relationship with Ken as brothers-in-law (with their respective wives being sisters) is mentioned for the first time in the games in Ken's ending in the Japanese version of the original EX2. Guile returns as a playable character in Street Fighter IV (2008), Guile investigates S.I.N. and their connection to Shadaloo. Guile also appears as a supporting character in the crossover fighting game Street Fighter X Tekken (2012), with Abel as his official tag partner.

Guile returns as the first of the delayed characters in Street Fighter V (2016–2022), as one of 6 DLC characters. In this game, he is now promoted to a colonel rank. During Shadaloo's final scheme under a Black Moon-based Operation C.H.A.I.N.S., Guile suddenly encounters Charlie, who was resurrected by an unknown assailant, and joined the said third party side, despite their motives for Shadaloo's downfall are same. After Charlie cures Abel of M. Bison's Psycho Power, Guile reconciles with his undead friend. Guile joins the heroes who Karin recruited who join a final assault against the Shadaloo, While Rashid managed to shutdown Shadaloo's Operation C.H.A.I.N.S, Guile, Ryu, and Chun-Li watch Charlie a final time where the latter sacrifices his life to weaken M. Bison. Guile decides to retire from fighting to be with his family and become a mentor of the son of late-Robert Sullivan, Luke. Guile returns in Street Fighter 6 (2023), which itself takes place after Street Fighter III. Guile returns to his duty to investigate the ongoing conspiracy at Nayshall caused by the Amnesia terrorist organization led by JP, ever since they framed Ken for the crime he did not commit.

Guile appears in both the arcade and home versions of Street Fighter: The Movie. Both versions were two separately-produced 1995 fighting games that used digitized footage from the live-action Street Fighter film, in which Guile was the lead character. Actor Jean-Claude Van Damme posed for Guile's animation frames in the game.

The Alpha 3 incarnation of Guile appears as a selectable character in several fighting game crossovers which including Marvel vs. Capcom 2 (2000), Capcom vs. SNK (2000), Capcom vs. SNK 2 (2001) and Capcom Fighting Jam (2003). He also appears in the SNK-produced installments of SNK/Capcom crossovers in SNK vs. Capcom: Match of the Millennium (1999), SNK vs. Capcom: SVC Chaos (2003) and the SNK vs. Capcom: Card Fighters series. A super-deformed version of the character is playable in the mobile puzzle game Street Fighter: Puzzle Spirits (2014).

Guile appears in Charlie's ending in X-Men vs. Street Fighter (he is not identified by name, only as "Charlie's friend"), swearing revenge on Bison for apparently killing Charlie. A Guile-inspired costume for players to use in Sony's LittleBigPlanet was released as downloadable content. Guile appears as an assist trophy in Super Smash Bros. Ultimate, using Flash Kick and Sonic Boom. Guile was also added to Fortnite Battle Royale, along with Cammy on August 3, 2021. A playable Guile skin will also be added to Exoprimal.

=== In other media ===
==== Live-action ====
Jan Lamb played a parody version of Guile in Wong Jing's 1993 live-action adaptation of City Hunter.

Jacky Cheung's Broom Man in the 1993 Hong Kong parody film Future Cops is based on Guile.

In the 1994 live-action Street Fighter film, William F. Guile is played by Jean-Claude Van Damme. Guile is commanding the A.N. forces as he searches for General M. Bison. His motivation for searching for Bison is not to avenge Charlie's death but to end Bison's corrupt organization and to rescue Charlie (who becomes Blanka), although he receives a great deal of help to find Bison's base, and is aided in his mission. Van Damme was approached to reprise the role in the reboot, Street Fighter: The Legend of Chun-Li, but ultimately did not appear.

In the 2014 The Pete Holmes Show recurring segment Street Fighter: Red Tape, Joel McHale portrays Guile, who is depicted in the segment as applying for a job, unable to clearly explain what war he fought in.

Guile was planned to appear in the second season of Street Fighter: Assassin's Fist, titled Street Fighter: World Warrior; series creator Joey Ansah was interested in casting Scott Adkins as Guile. World Warrior was eventually scrapped in favor of Street Fighter: Resurrection; Guile was mentioned by Ken in the Resurrection episode "Fight & Flight" but did not appear in the series.

In the 2026 live-action Street Fighter film, Cody Rhodes portrays Guile. In this film, he is depicted as being romantically and physically interested in men.

==== Animation ====
Guile is one of the main characters in the 1994 anime film Street Fighter II: The Animated Movie, where he is voiced by Masane Tsukayama in the Japanese original and by Kirk Thornton (credited as Donald Lee) in the English dub. Guile, serving as a jet fighter pilot and ranked as a Captain (O-3) in the U.S. Near the end of the film, Guile manages to track Ryu down but is followed by Bison and a brainwashed Ken. Guile engages Bison who finishes the fight by blasting Guile down a chasm. Guile survives this, although exhausted and bloodied, and when Bison finds Guile, he decides to spare him as an insult, and leaves. Guile is rescued along with Balrog by E. Honda. In his final scene, Guile, fully recovered, is moved to tears when informed that Chun-Li survived Vega's attack.

Based loosely on the storyline of the 1994 film while combining elements from Street Fighter II, Guile serves as the protagonist of the Street Fighter animated series, and is depicted as the leader of an organization of Street Fighters consisting of himself and fellow fighters. Bison has survived his battle with Guile following the events of the film, and Guile's sole goal is to destroy Bison once and for all.

Guile appears in the 1995 anime series Street Fighter II V, where he is voiced by Tesshō Genda in the Japanese original and once again by Kirk Thornton in the English Animaze dub and by Rob Mungle in the ADV Films dub. In this TV series, Guile is a Master Sergeant (E-7) in the U.S. Air Force, who spends most of his time training physically and who has great pride in the Air Force and motivates Ryu and Ken to improve themselves. Later in the series, Guile is recruited by Ken's father along with his friend Charlie when Ryu, Ken and Chun-Li are taken captive by Shadaloo. He faces Zangief while infiltrating Bison's base. Guile knocks Zangief out, but is unable to save Nash from Bison, who pits a brainwashed Chun-Li against the enraged Sergeant. Outside, Guile fights Chun-Li until Bison's demise snaps her out of her brainwashing.

==== Printed ====
In UDON's Street Fighter comic adaptation, Guile plays a central role alongside Chun-Li, especially in the first arc, though he remains a recurring character throughout later arcs. Like in the official series lore, Guile pursues Shadaloo to uncover the fate of his missing Air Force comrade, Charlie Nash, who originally trained him in combat.

During the first story arc, Guile searches for Ryu, believing him to have ties to Shadaloo. His investigation takes him across the United States and eventually to Japan. There, he and Chun-Li confront Charlie—brainwashed and operating under the codename "Agent Shadow." They manage to fight him off, but their confrontation culminates in a battle against M. Bison. In a pivotal moment, Charlie regains his senses, taps into latent Psycho Power, and sacrifices his life to bring down Bison. Charlie's death, reminiscent of Guile's ending in Street Fighter Alpha 3, leaves Guile devastated and vowing revenge on Shadaloo.

Following these events, Guile continues working with Chun-Li to track Bison, whom they believe survived Charlie’s sacrifice. Throughout this time, Guile struggles to balance his pursuit of vengeance with his strained family life—particularly his relationship with his wife, Julia, and their daughter, Amy. By the conclusion of the comic's second arc, Guile reconciles with his family while maintaining his dedication to stopping Shadaloo.

In the Street Fighter II series of comics, Guile’s role becomes less prominent, but he accepts an invitation to M. Bison's fighting tournament as a final attempt to avenge Charlie. This sets the stage for the events of Street Fighter II Turbo, where Guile officially enters the tournament alongside Chun-Li.

While on Shadaloo Island, Guile is approached by Cammy, who secretly asks for his help while pretending to serve Bison. Working under her covert guidance, Guile and Chun-Li intentionally orchestrate their own eliminations from the tournament. This maneuver allows them to aid the Delta Red squadron, freeing them from Bison's control.

Their efforts culminate in the destruction of Bison's Psycho Drive, a powerful device that amplifies Psycho Power and sustains Bison’s influence. Following the intense battle and the collapse of Shadaloo Island, Guile and his allies escape to safety.

In the aftermath, Guile finds closure, believing that Charlie's sacrifice has been avenged. With Bison defeated and Shadaloo in disarray, Guile chooses to step back from his vendetta. The series closes with him contentedly living with Julia and Amy, finally at peace after years of conflict.

Guile also appears alongside other Street Fighter characters in the Archie Comics crossover event Worlds Unite, which featured various Capcom and Sega franchises guest-starring in the Sonic the Hedgehog, Sonic Universe, Mega Man, and Sonic Boom comics.

== Reception ==
Since his introduction, Guile has been positively received, ranking 4th in Gamest magazine's list of Best Characters introduced in 1991. IGN's D. F. Smith stated that while "there's nothing too fancy about him. He's just your basic, no-nonsense, all-American tough guy", his unique hairstyle and aesthetics helped give him enough personality to stand out. In another article for the website, he argued that the image of an "American soldier" is often the first that comes to mind for the Japanese, and felt of the whole cast the most like a "regular guy" in many ways. He voiced some disdain for how different the character was in the live action film, noting that despite Van Damme being a good fit physically, the rest of the aspects deviated too far. Den of Geek's Gavin Jasper praised Guile's backstory of revenge, and how the cost of his "soul" in the metaphorical sense helped make the conclusion of his story in Street Fighter II one of the best in video games overall. He further argued that compared to Chun-Li's own story of revenge, his was more compelling, stating "he has actual issues to work through". Though originally seen as one of the weakest characters from Street Fighter IV, VentureBeat claimed that revisions to the game made him one of the strongest ones instead generating cases of ragequiting. Guile's special move Sonic Boom was noted by Thrillingtalesofoldvideogames to stand out for being a more unique projectile technique than Ryu and Ken's Hadoken due to the different required execution. Meanwhile, the Flash Kick was pointed out for being used in Data East's fighting game Fighter's History for Felin, SNK's Fatal Fury 2 for Kim Kaphwan and The King of Fighters for Ash Crimson.

Nicholas Ware in a dissertation titled You Must Defeat Sheng Long to Stand a Chance suggested Guile acted as a connection for the series to American blockbuster films, comparing him to characters such as Rambo or those played by Charles Bronson who were often involved in quests for vengeance. He further argued that Guile's military background was not only intended to reflect the "one man army" hero archetype common in American films, but also reflect Japanese views of foreign military forces, establishing him to Japanese audiences as different from themselves compared to Ken for example, and thus not portrayed as crucial for inclusion in subsequent Street Fighter entries. Ware elaborated further to state he represents "both a trust in and a fear of white Western power, particularly military/martial power." University of Delaware professor Rachel Hutchinson also discussed the use of imagery and military aspects to illustrate Guile as "not Japanese", stating that combat was "militarized and sexualized" through the presentation of his character and aesthetics in Street Fighter II. She also noted the increased use of American iconography in this regard, namely in comparison to the first Street Fighter game, and how significant it was to Guile as a character through aspects such as his tattoos.

Game Software Magazine said Guile is embodied with the concept of revenge and thus uses a deadly fighting style. As a professional soldier, Guile is calm, brooding, and ruthless. Although a positive character, he still possesses a touch of sinister cunning, which adds to his charismatic appeal. Both in terms of martial arts skills and personality, Guile shares some similarities with the villainous M. Bison, perhaps due to their shared military background. He is also called a character suited for skilled fighters, as his attacks are "charge-up" type.

Guile has also appeared in the manga Hi Score Girl by Rensuke Oshikiri. The series' main character, Haruo Yaguchi, is a fan of Street Fighter II and always plays as Guile. This tends to be exaggerated to the point Haruo has hallucinations where he talks to Guile while playing the game or interacting with other gamers. In Japan, the character has been used by cosmetic company Yanagiya as a real-world spokesman for their "J-Gel" hair products.

Guile artwork was featured on an officially licensed NubyTech/UDON joypad for the Xbox, announced on May 25, 2005.
