= Christian Howard (actor) =

British actor

- Born: Christian Howard; 4 May 1984 (age 42); Sunderland, Tyne and Wear, England
- Occupations: Actor, model, martial artist, filmmaker
- Years active: 2005–present

Christian Howard (born 4 May 1984) is a British actor, model, martial artist, and filmmaker. He is best known for his performance as Ken Masters in the short film Street Fighter: Legacy, the 2014 web series Street Fighter: Assassin's Fist and its follow-up Street Fighter: Resurrection.

== Early life ==
Christian Howard was born in Sunderland, near Newcastle, in the United Kingdom on 4 May 1984. At the age of 13, Howard began his training in martial arts in Essex. Howard began his training in Kung Fu, but later trained in Karate, Taekwondo and Capoeira. He notes Bruce Lee and Jean-Claude Van Damme as his influences for training in the martial arts.

== Career ==
Howard made his film debut in 2005 with the indie film Love Struck and worked primarily in television movies and short films. In 2010, he played the role of Ken Masters in the short film Street Fighter: Legacy opposite Jon Foo as Ryu. In addition to playing Ken, Howard also co-wrote the screenplay and assisted with fight choreography with director Joey Ansah. He earned his first male lead role in a feature film with Ross Boyask's sword and sorcery homage Warrioress opposite Cecily Fay, who met Howard while he worked as a stuntman. Howard worked as a fight choreographer on films such as Dragon Crusaders and the Bollywood film Force and doubled for lead actor John Abraham. Howard had worked as assistant fight choreographer and doubled for idol Jean-Claude Van Damme on U.F.O.

In 2013, Howard co-starred as Wedge and served as assistant fight choreographer on Green Street 3: Never Back Down.

The overwhelming success of the 2010 short film Street Fighter: Legacy led to Capcom and Machinima financing the web-series Street Fighter: Assassin's Fist. Howard was able to return to the role of Ken Masters, but since Jon Foo was unavailable, Mike Moh replaced Foo as Ryu. The series was also co-written by Howard and again, Howard assisted with the series' fight choreography alongside co-star and series director Joey Ansah.

In 2016, Howard returned to the role of Ken Masters in the sequel series Street Fighter: Resurrection alongside Mike Moh returning as Ryu and features Alain Moussi as Charlie Nash.

He has also expressed interest in playing the lead role of He-Man in Mattel's rumored Masters of the Universe film.

== Filmography ==
- Stay Out (2023) - Paul Anthony
- The Royal Bake Off (2023) - James
- A Lifeguard's Obsession (2023) - Blake Hopkins
- Stepping Into Love (2023) -Devon
- Perspectives (Short) (2022) - Sam
- Love Off the Page (2022) - Adam
- Jack & Blue (Short) (2022) - Jack/Oliver
- Infinity System (Short) (2022) - Wayne
- When the Mist Clears (2022) - Matt
- Lucifer (2021) - Sandwich Goon in "Partners 'Til the End"
- Immortal 65 (Short) (2021) - Orson Randall/Iron Fist / Writer
- Thicker (2021) - Barnes
- The Cocktail Party (Short) (2021) - Thief Guy
- Born a Champion (2021) - Parking Lot Drunk Guy #2
- Fatal Fury: Mark of the Wolves (Short) (2021) - Terry Bogard/Producer/Fight Choreography
- Oddjob (Short) (2020) - James Bond
- Ripper (2017) - Ricochet
- Thirst of the Ancients (2017) - Dario
- Dead.Gay.Fictional (Short) (2016) - James Bond
- Jack (2016) - Jack
- Option Zero (2016) - Nate
- Street Fighter: Resurrection (2016) - Ken Masters
- Impossible (Short) (2015) - Fitzgerald Grant
- Street Fighter: Assassin's Fist (2014) - Ken Masters
- Control (Short) (2014) - The Henchman
- Green Street 3: Never Back Down (2013) - Wedge/assistant fight choreographer
- The Making of a Cold (Short) (2012) - Sebastian Buck/Roger
- U.F.O. (2012) - Bartholomew/assistant fight choreographer/stunt double
- Brother (Short) (2012) - Prince Lucius
- Awake (Short) (2012) - C
- Bound (Short) (2012) - Captain Stevens
- Force (2011) - fight choreographer/stunt double
- 10 Minutes (Short) (2011) - Mike
- Dragon Crusaders (2011) - Calvain/fight choreographer
- Warrioress (2011) - Finvarrah/Raider
- Love of Brian (Short) (2010) - George
- The Seer (Short) (2010) - Kano
- Street Fighter: Legacy (Short) (2010) - Ken Masters/assistant fight choreographer
- Am I Digital? (Short) (2009) - Assassin
- Game (Short) (2008) - Eddie
- Voyage: Killing Brigitte Nielsen (2007) - Chris
- Love Struck (2005) - Door Evictee #1
