= Future Cops =

1993 Hong Kong film by Wong Jing

- Official poster

Chinese name
- Traditional Chinese: 超級學校霸王
- Simplified Chinese: 超级学校霸王
Transcriptions
Standard Mandarin
- Hanyu Pinyin: Chāojí Xuéxiào Bàwàng
Yue: Cantonese
- Jyutping: Ciu1 Kap1 Hok6 Haau4 Baa3 Wong4
- Directed by: Wong Jing
- Written by: Wong Jing
- Produced by: John Higgins
- Starring: Andy Lau; Jacky Cheung; Aaron Kwok; Chingmy Yau; Dicky Cheung; Simon Yam; Ekin Cheng; Winnie Lau; Charlie Yeung; Andy Hui; Ken Lo; Billy Chow
- Cinematography: Andrew Lau
- Edited by: Poon Hung
- Music by: Marco Wan; Lee Hon-kam
- Production companies: Fantasy Productions; Wong Jing's Workshop Ltd.
- Distributed by: Golden Harvest
- Release date: 15 July 1993
- Running time: 95 minutes
- Country: Hong Kong
- Language: Cantonese
- Box office: HK$18,294,196

Future Cops (Chinese: 超級學校霸王; literal title: Super-School Tyrant) is a 1993 Hong Kong action-comedy film loosely based on Capcom's fighting game Street Fighter II: The World Warrior (1991), starring an ensemble cast of Andy Lau, Jacky Cheung, Aaron Kwok, Chingmy Yau, Dicky Cheung and Simon Yam.

It was the second live-action film to feature characters inspired by the Street Fighter series, the first being City Hunter starring Jackie Chan, which was also directed by Wong Jing, but released six months earlier. The following year the official adaptation Street Fighter: The Ultimate Battle was released.

== Plot ==
In the year 2043, an evil and anonymous crime lord who only goes by "The General" is attempting world domination. He was arrested and was sentenced to jail by the Judge. The General's minions, Kent, Thai King, and Toyota travel to the year 1993 to kill the Judge before he has a chance to get into office.

During a battle with The General's minions, the Future Cops Lung, Broomhead, Ti Man, and Sing hear of their plot. The Police Director decides to send them back to the past also to protect the Judge. Lung ultimately stays behind because he is the Police Director's brother in law.

Once the Future Cops get to 1993, they land in the backyard of 28 years old high school student Tai-Hung, who helps them stay under cover by letting them live with him and his family. Ti Man pretends to be a fellow student while striking up a romance with Tai-Hung's sister Chun-May; Broomhead pretends to be a music teacher at the school while also striking up a romance with one of the students, Crab Angel; while Sing follows Tai-Hung pretending to be his servant, all the while protecting him from the evil school bullies, while Tai-Hung pursues a romance of his own with his long-time friend, Choi-Nei. Eventually the villains show up, wreak havoc, and many battles ensue.

Kent also goes undercover as a teacher in an effort to find out the identity of Tai-Hung. He subtly ambushes Ti Man with poison that regresses his intelligence to those of a 5-year old, before tricking Crab Angel into bringing him to a lover's spot. Broomhead tails them, and after a series of fights, decides not to kill Kent. Kent, not wanting to owe him a favour, injects the antidote into Ti Man before leaving.

The General eventually takes over the school as the principal and has the school in a lockdown to force the cops to hand over Tai-Hung.

At Tai-Hung's birthday party, he realizes that the villains are after him and wishes to coward his way out of the situation. This continues even after the cops inject microchips into Tai-Hung, Chun-May, Tai-Hung's father and Tai-Hung's mother to give them super powers.

The cops confront the villains in the school. After crashing his hoverboard into the school building, Tai-Hung manages to awaken his powers. Meanwhile, the other heroes fight with The General, but are unable to defeat him. Kent, disagreeing with the way The General approaches the matter, becomes a turncoat and joins in the fight. Only when all the heroes join forces are they able to win.

== Cast ==
| Actor/Actress | Role | Hanzi | Street Fighter Counterpart | Counterpart in other media |
|---|---|---|---|---|
| Andy Lau | Ti Man | 鐵面 | Vega | Mario (during arcade scene) |
| Jacky Cheung | Broomhead | 掃把頭 | Guile | |
| Aaron Kwok | Lung | 阿龍 | Ryu | |
| Chingmy Yau | Chun-may | 春美 | Chun-Li | Luigi (during arcade scene) |
| Dicky Cheung | Chan Tai-hung | 陳大雄 余鐵雄 | | Son Goku (during and after final battle scene) |
| Simon Yam | Sing | 發達星 八大師兄 | Dhalsim | |
| Ekin Cheng | Kent | 阿健 | Ken Masters | |
| Winnie Lau | Siu-Wai | 小慧 | | |
| Charlie Yeung | Choi-nei | 采妮 | | |
| Andy Hui | Kei-on | 余忌安 | | |
| Ken Lo | General | 將軍 | M. Bison | |
| Billy Chow | Thai King | 泰王 | Sagat | |
| William Duen | Toyota | 豐田 | E. Honda | |
| Kingdom Yuen | Chun-doi | 春代 | | |
| Richard Ng | Uncle Richard Yu | 青狼 | Blanka | |
| Natalis Chan | Sports Announcer | | | |
| Dennis Chan | Headmaster | | | |
| Newton Lai | Future Cops Commander | | | |
| Dave Lam | Discipline teacher | | | |
| Lee Siu-kei | Plumber | | | |
| Fanny Leung | CR3 | | | |
| Sam Hoh | Leon Lai | | | |
| Lam Foo-wai | School Bully | | | |

== Game references and differences ==
- All the characters in the film have the likeness, fighting style, and special attacks of the Street Fighter II video game characters they are based on.
- In the final battle of the film, Chun-may and her mother simultaneously (both dressed as Chun-Li) perform Chun-Li's "yatta!" win animation from Street Fighter II.
- Vega (Ti Man), who is normally a villain in the video game series, is the main hero, whereas Ken (Kent) and E. Honda (Toyota) are villains as opposed to heroes.
- In the scene where Ti Man and Chun-may are on a date at an arcade, they jump into a game of Super Mario World (1990).
- Through most of the film, Ti Man (Vega), and Chun May (Chun-Li) wear normal school clothes, Ti Man wears half a mask and Chun May wears glasses.
- Despite having the same moves as Ryu, Ken also had a somewhat psychic power (seen in a scene where he use some kind of Psychic force from his eye to push away a lady in a convenience store) perhaps due to his second-in-command status with The General (M. Bison).
- Ken and Guile who normally have blonde hair, have black hair with bleached-blonde streaks in the film. In addition to their minor changes, instead of the names of their projectile moves being "Surge Fist" and "Sonic Boom", they have been changed to "Swaying Fist" and "Crescent Knife".
- Dhalsim, who is normally bald and had earrings, has black hair with red streaks and left earring in the film.
- The film's M. Bison is revealed to be an evil cyborg, similar to Rudolf von Stroheim from the JoJo's Bizarre Adventure manga, and as opposed to the canonical M. Bison who is very much human. M. Bison is shown in scenes to be fire-proof and can talk without moving his mouth.
- The story also takes inspiration from The Terminator (1984), centering on a killer cyborg from the future going back in time to slaughter the main young protagonist, while a human resistance group also goes back in time to defend the protagonist. The Future Cops also warped into the past the same way as T-800 in Terminator 2: Judgment Day (1991), except none of them were naked.
- Sagat who is usually a bald-headed behemoth of a man with muscles, large hands and severe scars. He is shown in the film as being six-foot-tall, with a flattop haircut, and a goatee, but still wears his recognizable eyepatch.
- When Tai-hung wakes up to his abilities as Yu Tit-hung, he is dressed up as the character Son Goku from the Dragon Ball franchise.
- Though the Hadouken fireball was seen in the film, it's interesting to note that the fireball appear as the red glitch Hadouken from Street Fighter II Turbo and not the default light Hadouken from the game.
- Kei-on is seen in an arcade playing Street Fighter II': Champion Edition (1992), he is playing as Ken and fighting against Guile.
- Unlike the regular characters in this movie, the main characters who portray the Street Fighter characters here are actually invincible superheroes with superhuman strength unlike their game counterparts who are martial artists that can summon ki-force. Throughout the movie with scene where Ti Man got stabbed by Chun May but wasn't killed, Broom Man and Kent could lift and push a number of vehicles with just their bare hands, Ti Man could jump 3 story highs up and down a building, Ti Man ate snake venom but is still alive, etc.
- Characters from the game that are missing in the movie (or has no counterparts) are Zangief and Balrog as well as the newcomers from Super Street Fighter II: The New Challengers (Cammy White, Fei-Long, T. Hawk and Dee Jay). The movie was released at the same year as Super Street Fighter II.
