= Ken Masters =

Street Fighter character

- Street Fighter character
- Ken Masters in Street Fighter III: 3rd Strike
- First game: Street Fighter (1987)
- Created by: Takashi Nishiyama
- Designed by: Shoei Okano (Street Fighter II)
- Portrayed by: Damian Chapa (1994 Street Fighter film, game); Christian Howard (Street Fighter: Legacy, Street Fighter: Assassin's Fist); Noah Centineo (2026 Street Fighter film)
- Voiced by: English: Eddie Frierson (SFII: The Animated Movie); Jason Douglas (SFII V, ADV dub); Stephen Apostolina (SFII V, Animaze dub); Scott McNeil (animated series); Steve Blum (Alpha: The Animation); Steve Cassling (Alpha: Generations); Reuben Langdon (SFIV–SFV); Vincent Tong (Puzzle Fighter); David Matranga (SF6, Fatal Fury: City of the Wolves); Japanese: Hitoshi Nishio (Note: Nishio provided the "Hadoken" voice line.) and Toshiharu Matsunaga (Note: Matsunaga provided the "Tatsumaki Senpukyaku" voice line.) (Street Fighter II, Champion Edition, Turbo); Toshihiko Seki (SFII drama CD); Kenji Haga (SFII: The Animated Movie, SFII V); Keiji Fujiwara (Japanese dub of the Street Fighter live-action film); Tetsuya Iwanaga (Alpha series, SFEX, SFEX 3, Super Puzzle Fighter II Turbo, X-Men vs. Street Fighter, Marvel Super Heroes vs. Street Fighter, Pocket Fighter, Marvel vs. Capcom 2, Namco × Capcom); Nobuyuki Hiyama (Real Battle on Film); Kōji Tobe (SFIII: New Generation and Second Impact); Yūji Kishi (SFIII: Third Strike, Capcom vs. SNK series, SFIV, SFXT, Project X Zone series, Wreck-It Ralph, SFV, SSBU, SF6, Fatal Fury: City of the Wolves,2026 Street Fighter film); Gō Yamane (SFEX 2, EX 2 Plus); Monster Maezuka (SVC Chaos: SNK vs. Capcom); Kazuya Ichijō (Alpha: The Animation); Eiji Hanawa (Alpha: Generations)

In-universe information
- Fighting style: Ansatsuken
- Spouse: Eliza Masters (wife)
- Children: Mel Masters (son)
- Origin: United States
- Nationality: American
- Ethnicity: Japanese-American

Ken Masters (Japanese: ケン・マスターズ, Hepburn: Ken Masutāzu) is a character in Capcom's Street Fighter fighting game series. The character was first introduced in the 1987 title Street Fighter as an alternate fighter to Ryu. While Ryu is devoted to testing his power, Ken instead focuses on developing a family with his wife Elisa. Ken becomes a mainstay in the following Street Fighter games. An alternate brainwashed version of him, Violent Ken (暴力的なケン), has also been featured in a few of his appearances. Ken's presence is in several sequels to the Street Fighter series in addition to its related media. He has also made crossover appearances in Namco × Capcom, Project X Zone, and Super Smash Bros.

Capcom designer Takashi Nishiyama created Ken when developing the first Street Fighter game. However, due to budget problems, Ken could only use Ryu's moves, which later resulted in their characterization as friendly rivals and fellow students of Gouken. Shoei Okano eventually redesigned the character in later games. Seeking to make the character more unique, Capcom redesigned Ken's red gi in Street Fighter V and Street Fighter 6, though the latter resulted in changing his entire character depicting his life as less stable.

Despite being recognized as a clone of Ryu, Ken develops a more social life rather than devoting his life to his training like Ryu. Their similarities inspired the term Shotokans in other fighting games besides Street Fighter. The evolution of his gameplay and design has been popular among gamers for becoming more unique. However, some critics were critical of his role in Street Fighter 6, which was significantly changed due to the sudden increase in depression resulting from losing his family.

== Creation ==
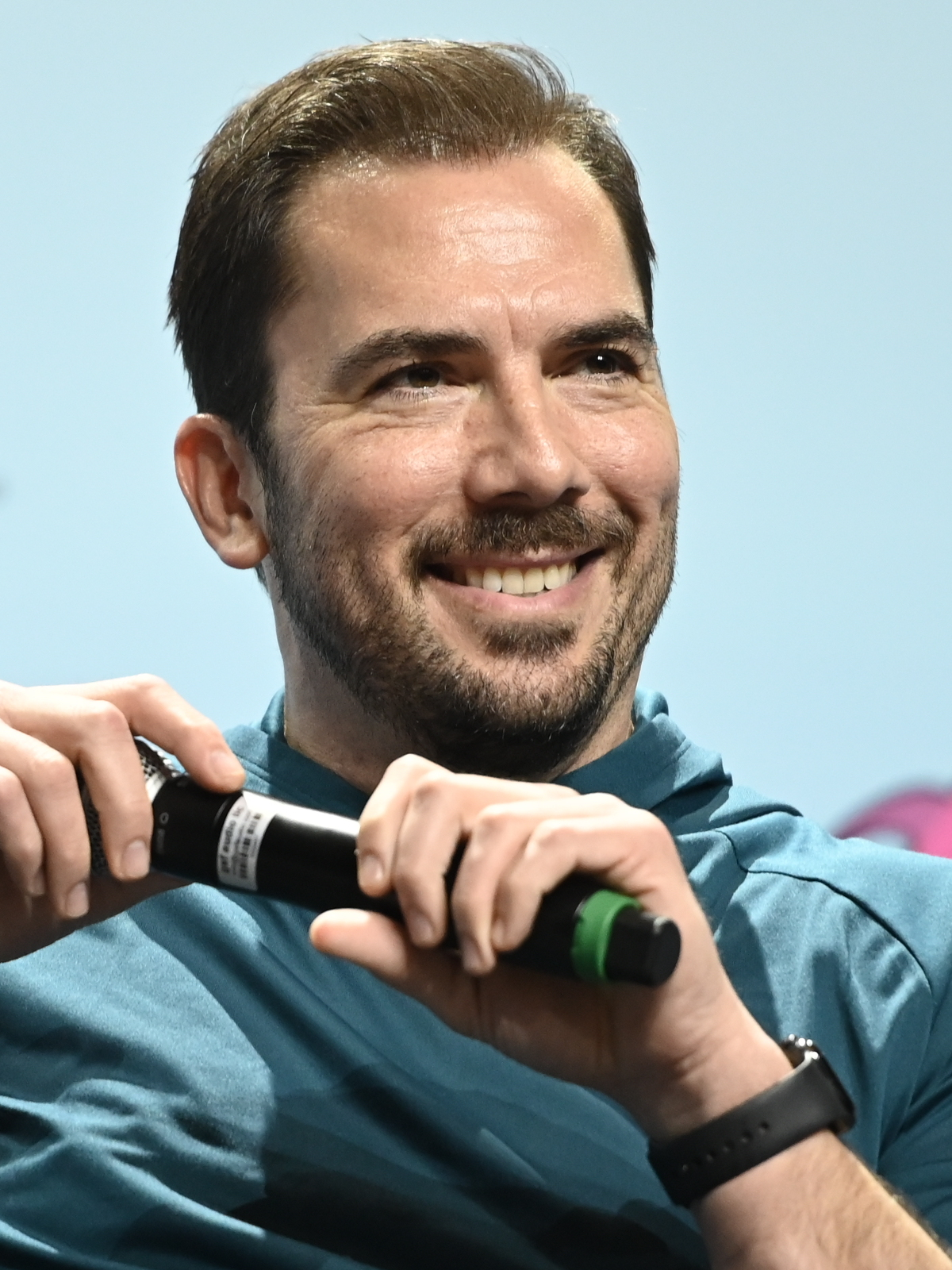
David Matranga voices Ken in Street Fighter 6.

Capcom designer Takashi Nishiyama created Ken's character as he became Street Fighter director when coming up ideas with a project. Inspired by Spartan X, Nishiyama took notes about the needs of Street Fighter. Planner Hiroshi Matsumoto was influenced by martial arts which led to the usage of multiple styles. Nishiyama thinks the most regrettable experience of the game was the fact that, they had all these ideas for coming up with different playable characters that they wanted to put into the game, but due to budget concerns, scheduling concerns, among others, eventually that got reduced to only Ken and Ryu. Nishiyama would have loved to have more playable characters, but Capcom were only able to put in just the two of them.

In Street Fighter II, Ken and Ryu were originally going to be Y.S.'s characters; however, he ended up taking over in the early stages. Okano remembers making the dot patterns for the Shoryuken and the Hadoken special moves first. After that, he moved away from game design and created a design room for the illustrations and manuals. Akiman recalls having drafts for most characters except Ken and Ryu. Y.S. eventually finished the characters. From there, the first move he made was the Hadoken. Ryu and Ken "are the so-called standard characters in the" game, and since they were coming from the first Street Fighter game, they could have the other characters be "weirdos". He gave them a stoic feel. Numerous spinoff products were made as well during the game's popularity: when Capcom licensed Hasbro to produce a line of action figures, Ken was given the surname "Masters" to avoid trademark conflict with Mattel's Ken dolls. The full name Ken Masters was used in the animated Street Fighter II movie and in the Street Fighter II V series before being canonized in the video games with Street Fighter Alpha 2.

The first decision when making the prequel Street Fighter Alpha was keeping Ken, Ryu and Chun-Li. Capcom did not want to end up with just Japanese and Asian characters. As much as we could, they wanted to think in terms of creating a good balance, with all sorts of different skin colors. The secret of Street Fighter Alpha is the Ryu and Ken vs. Bison team up mode, where if word did not get out, we figured we would just stay silent. However, the staff spoiled it. While they found such idea fun, it eventually became a troublesome mode. This eventually inspired more team up fights involving characters who wear opposing colors like Ryu and Ken. Yasuda disliked the handling of Ryu and Ken as old characters, resulting in the creation of Sakura Kasugano as a response to a younger, cooler fighter that contrast the others especially in outfits. In the prequel Street Fighter Alpha Capcom did not want to end up with just Japanese and Asian characters. As much as we could, they wanted to think in terms of creating a good balance, with all sorts of different skin colors. The secret of Street Fighter Alpha is the Ryu and Ken vs. Bison team up mode, where if word did not get out, we figured we would just stay silent. With Street Fighter IV, the producer said that while Ryu comes across as an ordinary man, Ken contrast him with a more well-defined face. Furthermore, they said he has "a cool, fun-loving guy." which made him easier to design.

In both SNK vs. Capcom: SVC Chaos and Street Fighter II, game designers created an alternate persona called "Violent Ken" with stronger moves than the regular Ken Masters. Despite similarities with Ryu's evil persona caused by not being able to control his dark powers, Violent Ken is the result of the villain M. Bison manipulating Ken with his Psycho Power. This exploits Ken's hidden side including fears or hatred, most notably his inferiority complex over Ryu. Further, Ken starts wielding purple flames alongside all of his attacks. Eventually, Ken recovers his original persona when seeing his best friend's red bandana which is a present the character gives him in Street Fighter Alpha 2. Though Ken did not undergo several changes in Street Fighter IV, he and Ryu Rufus were meant to be have an acrobatic bald slender black male wearing a gi named "King Cobra", meant to be a more, the character became Rufus. Reuben Langdon voiced Ken in Street Fighter IV, Super Smash Bros. Ultimate and Street Fighter V. David Matranga took over in Street Fighter 6, feeling responsibility for it as a result of the series' popularity. He also regarded Ken as iconic based on how he gets the chance to yell his attack's names which required lessons of screaming and grunting.

The character's inclusion in the SNK fighting game Fatal Fury: City of the Wolves over Ryu was done because producer Yasuyuki Oda said in the Capcom vs. SNK crossover games, Ken's character was often promoted alongside Terry Bogard, who originated in Fatal Fury. This was in contrast to Ryu, who was marketed alongside Kyo Kusanagi, who originated in The King of Fighters '94. This reasoning was also done with fellow character Chun-li who tends to be promoted alongside Mai Shiranui.

=== Designs ===
Originally deemed too similar to Ryu, Ken has been redesigned by Capcom with new outfits for Street Fighter V (left) and Street Fighter 6 to become more original.

In the original Street Fighter, Ken fought barefoot and wore yellow arm bands without gloves. Ken and Ryu were designed to be nearly identical and share the same moves despite their different races. Y.S. was in charge of Ken and Ryu in Street Fighter II. Ken has neck-length dyed-blonde hair, black eyebrows, and wears a red sleeveless keikogi with a black belt. By the time of Street Fighter V, Ken's appearance underwent a design change. Ken's gi top now hangs around his waist and he wears a black v-neck training shirt with several red linings in its place. He sports black sparring gloves and has his hair tied back in a topknot instead of hanging loose which it was grown into medium length after the events of Street Fighter III series and now wears black ankle wraps with red linings instead of barefoot. For this game, Capcom wanted to differentiate Ken and Ryu's moves since they have been seen as "clones". According to Street Fighter V Senior Manager Matt Dahlgren, "Ken's more of the hothead. He's the one that's gonna rush you down and be in your face, so his V-Skill is a run move that can be used to constantly pressure your opponent." In Undisputed Street Fighter: A 30th Anniversary Retrospective, it was noted that while Ken was already a popular character in previous games, his redesign in Street Fighter V helped to improve it thanks to its more original take. This also was helped by the fact that Ken's special moves have flames in contrast to Ryu's electric Denjin Hadoken. After 30 years in Street Fighter V, the moves and new designs help Ken look his own. For the crossover game with Tekken, Street Fighter X Tekken, Ken was given an alternate costume based on Tekken fighter Lars Alexandersson, while several fashionable American-like clothing was scrapped.

While still performing similar moves in Street Fighter 6, Ken and Ryu were designed to play different; Ken became more aggressive and dynamic whereas Ryu was more defensive and strategic. By this game, Capcom decided to alter Ken's design far more than in Street Fighter V dropping his red gi. Takayuki Nakayama and art director Kaname Fujioka addressed this change in the character claimed that with every installment Ken's life became more stable and wanted to create a reason. When comparing the two heroes in Street Fighter II, Fujioka says "Ken as a fiery and explosive character" when compared to the serious Ryu. In the Alpha series, he was a little more playful and lighthearted in a way. Capcom wanted to contrast Ken to the new lead Luke. As a result, Capcom decided to give Ken a more serious situation in the story compared to his previous appearances as he can no longer see his family. In writing this, Capcom closely worked with Udon Entertainment to write Ken's decay. Fujioka believes the team were successful at changing Ken's character.

=== Gameplay ===
Ken and Ryu shared the same moves despite their different races as a symbol of being rivals and fellow students. However, Ken was given a more competitive personality than Ryu. The special technique Hadouken (波動拳, hadōken) energy wave attack was based on the wave motion gun from the titular spacecraft in the sci-fi anime series Space Battleship Yamato, which Nishiyama watched during the seventies. Ken and Ryu's other two techniques from the first Street Fighter game, Shoryuken (昇龍拳, Shōryūken) and Tatsumaki Senpukyaku (竜巻旋風脚) were inspired by actual martial arts moves, which were exaggerated for the character. These three moves were reused in Street Fighter IV by master Gouken but stronger based on Kamei's desire to make the master more skilled in comparison. Ken and Ryu develop stronger versions of the Hadoken due to a desire of Akira Nishitani and Akira Yasuda in regards to the size of the move in Street Fighter II. Shoei Okano animated the new Hadoken. The Karate duo which coined the term Shotokan for sharing the same moves and similar designs. Shotokans were created in other franchises and more in Street Fighter follow ups. This includes the antagonistic Akuma, the young Sakura Kasugano and the parody character Dan Hibiki.

Producer Yoshiki Okamoto noted that Ken ended up being far more powerful than Ryu in Street Fighter II despite having the same special moves. During testing locations, Capcom noticed the North American player had more victories. Although the staff had to say in interviews that the duo were equals, there was a cheat that made Ken stronger. This was due to a mechanic called Core. The way special moves were performed in 1991 gave characters a fragment of time they were more vulnerable. Because Capcom realized the mistake cause by Core, they removed it from the video game except Ryu. This was caused by a difference in the formation of the Shoryuken that left Ryu altered whereas Ken kept strong enough to perform two special moves in a row. This resulted in Ken being the stronger of the Karate duo. Despite being an aggressive character, Ken is unnotable for aerial combat, making him weaker to Dhalsim, Sagat and Guile in this occasion. He becomes more offensive with the Alpha series. For Street Fighter III, Capcom, had planned to add more moves for Ken, but his special was already qualified as Shoryuken so strong, he kind of became a "one-trick pony character". Even if players had problems with him, he was still strong enough to defeat several other characters. Capcom noted Ken and Ryu have a more American style of Karate, so they created fellow fighter Makoto to have a more Japanese style. They tried to make her moveset and controls reflect that, too. Ken remained as one of the most requested characters in location tests of the games.

== Appearances ==
=== In video games ===
==== Street Fighter games ====
Ken made his first appearance in 1987 in the original Street Fighter. He is characterized as the best friend, and rival of the main character, Ryu, who trained under the same master, Gouken. The single-player tournament can only be played with Ken after the second player defeats the first player in a two-player match. Ken is one of the three characters from the original game to return in the game's sequel, Street Fighter II, in 1991. Here, Ken is invited to participate in the World Warrior tournament by Ryu, having already moved away from Japan to live in America. In Ken's ending, he ends up marrying his girlfriend Eliza. As revealed in the spin-off Street Fighter EX2, this makes him brothers-in-law with fellow fighter Guile, who married Eliza's older sister, Julia. The 2017 update Ultra Street Fighter II adds a stronger labeled "Violent Ken" in Japan as an alternate playable character.

Street Fighter Alpha features a younger Ken who is searching for Ryu, having recently won the first "World Warrior" tournament in the events of the original Street Fighter. In Ken's ending in the original Alpha, he defeats Ryu and heads back to America, where he meets Eliza, telling her his objective is to defeat a certain man. Alpha was followed by its own line of sequels: Alpha 2, which follows the same plot as in the original Alpha where Ken decides to fight Ryu after realizing something happened to his mind after defeating Sagat in the first game. Street Fighter Alpha 3 takes place after the events in the first two games has Ken becoming a brainwashed boss controlled by the villain M. Bison should the player use Ryu and then be saved. In Ken's story mode, the fighter starts suffering an inferiority complex over Ryu but after fighting his fan Sakura Kasugano he gets over it thanks to her spirit. Afterwards, Ken defeats Bison in his route.

Ken's following appearance is in Street Fighter III. The storyline reveals that he is still friendly with Ryu and has a student named Sean. In his ending from the first two installment, it is revealed that Ken has a son named Mel who is already a child. In the sequel Street Fighter III: 3rd Strike, Ken's ending involves him winning a fighting tournament and celebrating it with his family and Sean. In Street Fighter IV, Ken enters into the world tournament while waiting for the birth of Mel worried about being able to become a proper family man while worrying about his competition. In his ending, Ken reunites with his wife and his newborn child Mel happily. Ken also appears in Street Fighter V; Ken and Ryu's younger ages are also explored in the tutorial similar to the Alpha trilogy. His adult years as a family man are also given their own stage where the Masters family remember their previous years with Ryu and fights Birdie in the present. He later goes to a party from Sakura's friend Karin who challenges to another fight. In the end, Ken and Eliza makes it to the party properly where the former worries about Ryu's fight with his inner darkness. Ken also appears playable in the larger Street Fighter V story mode where he is recruited by Chun-Li's forces to take down Bison's group when Mel was two years old.

In Street Fighter 6, set years after the events of III, where Mel is now a teenager, Ken originally planned to form partnerships with JP and the young King of Nayshall to build the country's first coliseum martial arts tournament while hiring Luke as Mel's bodyguard. However, Ken learns that JP is a leader of a terrorist group known as Amnesia, having manipulated Ken into unknowingly funding his criminal activities instead of opening the tournament. Then, Deepfake footage of Ken frames him for taking part in the conspiracy. As his situation is dire, Ken goes into hiding to protect his family while hunting JP, ever since the latter briefly kidnapped Mel during the incident. In the game's World Tour mode, the player can find Ken working at a construction site while keeping a low profile. Though his name has been cleared at this point, he begins to question what he is fighting for.

==== Other games ====
In 1990, Capcom produced an action game for the Nintendo Entertainment System titled Street Fighter 2010: The Final Fight. The Japanese version of the game starred an original character named Kevin Straker, a cyborg policeman who fought against alien creatures in the future. When Capcom released 2010 in North America, the main character's identity was changed from Kevin to Ken, the game's story was also rewritten to imply that he was the same Ken from the original Street Fighter. Other than that, the game has little or no plot ties to the original Street Fighter and its part in the canonical Street Fighter series is disputed. Beased on the first animated movies, Ken appears playable in its game adaptation.

Outside the mainstream Street Fighter games, Ken appears in the Street Fighter EX games and in the mobile game Street Fighter: Puzzle Spirits. He also appears in crossover titles like X-Men vs. Street Fighter, Marvel Super Heroes vs. Street Fighter, Marvel vs. Capcom 2: New Age of Heroes, the Capcom vs. SNK series, and Street Fighter X Tekken. (Marvel vs. Capcom: Clash of Super Heroes has the distinction of being the first Street Fighter game in which Ken is not a playable character, although Ryu is able to access Ken's moveset when the player enters a certain command.) He also appears in the Street Fighter II: The Animated Movie and arcade versions of Street Fighter: The Movie. In SNK Playmore's fighting game SNK vs. Capcom: SVC Chaos he has an alter-ego named Violent Ken, who later made his full Street Fighter debut in Ultra Street Fighter II: The Final Challengers. Ken is featured in the tactical role-playing games Namco × Capcom, Project X Zone, and Project X Zone 2. Ken also makes a cameo as a Trophy in Super Smash Bros. for Nintendo 3DS and Wii U, as part of the Ryu DLC. He is playable in Super Smash Bros. Ultimate as an "echo fighter" or clone of Ryu. Ken is set to appear in Fatal Fury: City of the Wolves as part of the first season of downloadable content. For the game Tekken X Street Fighter producer Katsuhiro Harada commented that while Ryu and Ken might be able to perform his classic moves like the Hadouken reassuring his fans, most of his normal moves would be changed to play more like a Tekken character and fit the cast.

=== In other media ===
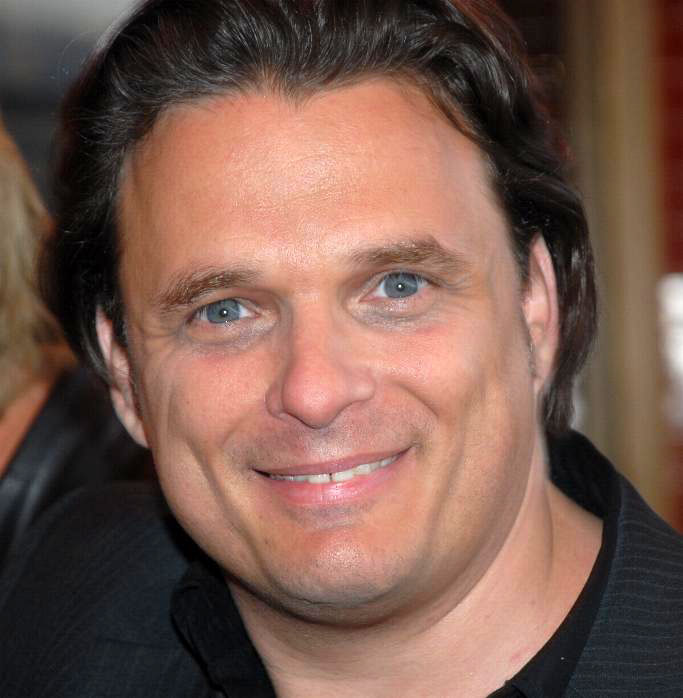
Damian Chapa portrayed Ken in a live-action film.

==== Live-action ====
Gary Daniels played a parody version of the character in Wong Jing's live-action adaptation of the manga City Hunter. Ekin Cheng's character of Kent is based on Ken Masters, being a villain in Wonng's parody film Future Cops. Both films were released in 1993.

Damian Chapa portrayed Ken in the 1994 Street Fighter movie, where he and Ryu (played by Byron Mann) are traveling con artists who steal money from wealthy crime bosses/lords and drug kingpins though various schemes such as selling modified toy guns.

British actor Christian Howard portrayed Ken in the live-action short film Street Fighter: Legacy, and reprised his role in the follow-up series Street Fighter: Assassin's Fist and Street Fighter: Resurrection. Taking place to a time similar to Street Fighter Alpha, the younger Ken is shown to be arrogant and impatient, and was brought to Japan at a young age by his father (a friend of Gouken's) to Gouken's dojo following the death of his mother. He finds a book showing the techniques of the Satsui no Hado and is warned by Gouken not to use them. During a bout with Ryu, Ryu is taken over by the Satsui No Hado, forcing Ken to nearly kill him with a flaming Shoryuken. As Gouken sends his two students off, he trusts Ken to look after Ryu.

Ken is portrayed by Noah Centineo in the 2026 reboot. Centineo's casting as Ken has been criticized as whitewashing.

==== Animation ====
In Street Fighter II: The Movie, he was voiced by Kenji Haga in the Japanese version and by Eddie Frierson in the English dub. Known as the world's strongest warrior after Ryu, Ken is kidnapped and brainwashed by M. Bison to defeat his best friend. In their eventual fight, Ken regains his senses and joins Ryu into defeating Bison together.

He was voiced by Scott McNeil in the Street Fighter animated series. In Street Fighter II V, he was voiced by Jimmy Theodore in the Animaze dub and Jason Douglas in the ADV Films dub. In the series, Ken and Ryu travel across the world to become stronger, learning to use the Hado energy while training with Dhalsim which attracts Bison in this portrayal. He was voiced by Kazuya Ichijo in Japanese and Steven Blum in the dub for the Street Fighter Alpha movie. The 1999 OVA Street Fighter Alpha: The Animation focuses on Ken and Ryu meeting Shun, a young boy who claims to be Ryu's brother. Shun's existence brings conflict with Professor Sadler and Rosanov whom Ken and Ryu fight; Sadler and Bison both seek out powerful fighters to absorb their abilities, particularly Ryu's Dark Hadou. Ryu searches for Shun after he is kidnapped by Rosanov, confronting Akuma in the process. The 2005 OVA Street Fighter Alpha: Generations features a similar storyline; however, Ken plays a minor role in comparison.

==== Comics ====
Ken has also appeared in printed adaptations that retell his role in the games.

== Reception ==
=== Promotion ===
Ken artwork was featured on an officially licensed NubyTech/UDON joypad for the PlayStation 2, which was announced on September 27, 2004; a Mad Catz joypad featuring Ken was also released for the PlayStation 3. Ken has also been popular thanks to Evo Moment 37. With 26 seconds remaining, Justin Wong had the option to run out the clock, but he was eager to end the match. Daigo Umehara's Ken parried Chun-Li's multihit Super Art II move, within six of sixty frames of the impact animation – about a tenth of a second. Umehara had to predict when his opponent would start his Super Art Move, essentially making the first parry before the move even started, and then perform the same split-second timing on all 14 of the remaining hits. Umehara did so, and went on to counter a final kick of Chun-Li in mid-air before launching a 12-hit combo, capped by Ken's Super Art III. The crossovers with SNK games though became popular as Terry Bogard from Fatal Fury was also created by Ken's creator. In Street Fighter 6, Terry was included as a guest since Nishiyama had created the first Street Fighter during his time at Capcom Terry and Ken have had past dialogue between them; They were very conscious of their relationship when they created them.

=== Critical response ===
Ryu and Ken's original moves brought a major impact in fighting games, earning the nickname of "shoto"; The fighters use three signature technques which have been replicated by other characters but with a different move with three techniques being the projectile Hadoken, the close uppercut Shoryuken and the spiraling kick Sepunkyaku. In future installments, Ryu and Ken were given new techniques based on real world similar to Andy Hug. GamePro said Ken and Ryu were the most notable palette swapped characters, with GamesRadar writer Tyler Wilde noted they have their own development. However, IGN's Jesse Schedeen stated that Ken could "easily suffer from Luigi Syndrome" for his resemblance with Ryu, but thanks to the sequels, Ken gained his own fighting style separated from Ryu's. Comic Book Resources specifically mentioned how Capcom made Ken more on his social life than Ryu that made his character more unpredictable to see what would happen to see him in every installment. His marriage is noted for changing his personality as the character decided to choose his wife over life competitions despite still being a playable character in every installment. In "“You Must Defeat Shen Long To Stand A Chance”: Street Fighter, Race, Play, and Player", Nicholas R. Ware from Bowling Green State University said Ken was Ryu's American counterpart due to their multiple similarities with Akuma instead being the darker one. However, both Ryu and Ken were noted by the writer to be nearly identical when it comes to gameplay in early installments of the Street Fighter franchise and only stand out due to their visual differences. The narrativge of Street Fighter IV would however explain this as the new character Gouken is revealed to be their mentor and he also uses variations of their three common special moves. Benjamin Wai-ming Ng from the University of Hong Kong further added that while characters like Ryu, Ken, and Chun-li may have been popular in Japan and other parts of the world, in China, they were overshadowed by the main characters from SNK's The King of Fighters series. In the book Japanese Culture Through Video Games, Ken is seen to be used to reinforce "national-cultural fantasy" as done with Ryu's characterization of a Japanese fighter with supernatural powers. After the first game, Ryu kept overshadowing Ken and newcomer Chun-Li as Ryu kept being used as the main figure of Street Fighter II. Moreover, the original duo eventually came across as "dull" in sequels when compared to the rest of the cast. In Street Fighter V, Ken was given a major redesign that stood out within game journalists for how different he was from his original look while also employing unique skills.

The Guardian recommended Ken alongside Ryu for beginners in Street Fighter IV with Ken being better at close-up fights as a result of his powerful uppercuts. In a humor article by GameSpy, the Super Street Fighter II Turbo version of Ken was mentioned to have become unbalanced to the point he was the strongest character from the cast. In Street Fighter III: Third Strike, Ken was also noted to be one of the three more powerful characters from the game alongside Chun-Li and Yun. Similarly, Dave Cook from Now Gamer called him and Tekken's Eddy Gordo one of the most hated characters from their franchises due to their overpowered moves. Jeremy Parish of Polygon said Ken went in Super Smash Bros. Ultimate "from garbage to glorious".

In, "Os reis da luta: representações do karate nos jogos digitais" Tiago Oviedo Frosi from Federal University of Rio Grande do Sul wrote that Gichin Funakoshi's "Shōtōkan" is the most practiced style of Karate in the world, this was the style chosen to characterize most of the Street Fighter characters including Ken. The Kyokugenryu Ryo uses in Art of Fighting instead comes across as a fantasy version of the "knockout" Kyokushinkaikan created by Mas Oyama who serves as an influence for both Ryu's and Takuma Sakazaki's characters, leading to the similarities between two characters from different franchices.

Before the release of Street Fighter 6, fans were confused about Ken's new design as discussed by GamesRadar. They noted that "he's been tossed out of the house by his wife and left in the gutter" leading to several speculations. The miserable design was also noted to contrast Ryu's better received new look. The resulted in gags where Ryu prioritized his free time into helping his best friend and that Ken was in so poor shape that he could barely perform his own techniques according to the media. With the reveal of Ken's narrative in the installment, Kotaku noted Ken's portrayal was hilarious as he has become "crypto-bro". The commentaries involving Ken going on a divorce and losing custody of his children led to internet memes involving pictures of the depressed fighter. Capcom's reveal that Ken's divorce was true resulted in Kotaku noting that fans were correct with the action of making so many memes. Polygon comically claimed that while Ken was not divorced in response to the fandom's takes, Capcom had to explain well what disaster forced Ken to split from his family and that his new designed made him across as miserable when compared to his previous incarnations. GamerFocus was pleased with Ken's inclusion in Fatal Fury: City of the Wolves due to how SNK chose to represent Capcom and become another spiritual sequel to the Capcom vs. SNK series, while PushSquare found him as a reasonable inclusion.

== Bibliography ==
- Studio Bent Stuff (Sep 2000). All About Capcom Head-to-Head Fighting Game 1987-2000. A.A. Game History Series (Vol. 1) (in Japanese). Dempa Publications, Inc. ISBN 4-88554-676-1.
- Monthly Arcadia Editorial Staff (Oct 2008). STREET FIGHTER IV MASTER GUIDE 拳の書. エンターブレインムック ARCADIA EXTRA VOL. 69 (in Japanese). Enterbrain. ISBN 978-4-7577-4513-1.
