= Green Street 3: Never Back Down =

- Directed by: James Nunn
- Written by: Ronnie Thompson
- Produced by: Simon Crowe
- Starring: Scott Adkins; Kacey Barnfield; Joey Ansah; Mark Wingett; Christian Howard
- Cinematography: Jonathan Iles
- Edited by: Tommy Boulding
- Music by: Paul Arnold; Andrew Barnabas
- Production companies: Lionsgate UK; Tea Shop Productions; SC Films International; Ingenious Investments
- Distributed by: Lionsgate Home Entertainment
- Release date: 21 October 2013 (United Kingdom)
- Running time: 93 minutes
- Country: United Kingdom
- Language: English

Green Street 3: Never Back Down (also known as Green Street 3 and Green Street Hooligans: Underground) is a 2013 British crime film directed by James Nunn and a sequel to the 2009 film Green Street 2: Stand Your Ground directed by Jesse V. Johnson.

== Plot ==
Danny Harvey was once the leader of the Green Street Elite, a group of hooligans supporting their beloved West Ham United. However, grown tired of the lifestyle, he leaves home and sets up shop as a mixed martial arts gym owner in Scotland. After being confronted by local gangsters for some protection money, Danny easily beats them and tells them if their boss ever sends them again, he will find him and handle it. Danny's new life is shattered when he learns his younger brother Joey has been killed in a hooligan brawl.

Returning home, Danny meets up with Victor, an old friend who has since become a policeman. Victor tells Danny not to get involved and that he will handle the matter of Joey's death. When Danny goes to the Abbey, the local pub the Green Street Elite hang out at, he finds himself infatuated with barkeep Molly and meets up with GSE members Gilly and Big John. Danny wants answers as to who killed Joey. They tell him that Joey had become something of a rebel hooligan and challenged the wrong team out of spite, and he was killed. Danny decides to rejoin the GSE much to the chagrin of Victor. However, Victor and Danny make a deal to co-operate with each other to find out who killed Joey, but they keep it on the down low.

Danny soon learns that the rules of hooliganism have changed. He learns the hard way when he arrives with the GSE at a game between West Ham and Tottenham. He breaks a bottle over a Tottenham hooligan's head and is arrested, only to be let go a few miles from the arena. When Gilly informs Danny of the new rules, a fight breaks out outside the Abbey between the GSE and Tottenham hooligans. Danny learns that there are now organized fights between hooligans, in teams of five. Danny decides to use his knowledge of mixed martial arts to train the members of the GSE for the organized fights. Meanwhile, as Victor continues his investigation of Joey's death, he is constantly finding himself being harassed by his superior.

Danny and the GSE, one day, see the Millwall team, led by the towering Mason. As Millwall easily destroy their opponents, Mason taunts Danny about Joey on numerous occasions. With a tournament between the teams happening, Danny continues to train the GSE and soon, the GSE begin to take out the competition. As they rise in the rankings, Mason begins to see the GSE as a potential threat. Meanwhile, when Molly catches Danny talking with Victor, she confronts him. Danny tells Molly that Victor is trying to help him find Joey's murderer. Molly, feeling betrayed, breaks up with Danny. When Danny leaves, Mason tells him to get in. Mason tells Danny that Gilly is the one who killed Joey because of his reckless behavior. When Danny beats up Gilly, it is revealed that Gilly knows who killed Joey. Gilly tells Danny that it was Mason who killed him.

When Victor is forced to meet with his boss, it is revealed that his boss is in fact Mason, who relieves Victor of his duties. The final in the tournament pits the GSE against Millwall. Hours before the fight, Danny sees a drunk Victor, who tells Danny of him losing his job. Danny tells Victor that he knows who killed Joey and will need his help in taking Millwall on. That night, in a caged arena in the middle of a football field, Victor is stunned to learn that his boss is the leader of Millwall and the one who killed Joey. Danny, Victor, and the GSE do their best to take out Millwall with the only ones left being Danny and Mason. Mason's overpowering Danny but Danny gets a second wind and eventually Danny does a flying drop kick sending Mason outside of the cage. The police arrive and arrest Mason while back at the Abbey, the GSE celebrate their victory as the number one hooligan team in the city.

== Cast ==
- Scott Adkins as Danny Harvey
- Kacey Barnfield as Molly
- Joey Ansah as Victor
- Jack Doolan as Gilly
- Josh Myers as John "Big John"
- Spencer Wilding as Mason
- Mark Wingett as Pete "Pistol Pete"
- Billy Cook as Joey Harvey
- Christian Howard as "Wedge"
- Mike Fury as Millwall Fighter
- Marc Edwards as Millwall Fighter
- Michael Walker as Millwall Fighter
- Allistair McNab as Millwall Fighter

== Production ==
Joey Ansah (who plays Victor), with assistance by Christian Howard (who co-stars as GSE member Wedge), trained the film's cast and fighters for the film's action sequences. The original title for the film when shooting began was Green Street Hooligans: Underground. However, upon its local release, the film was re-titled Green Street 3: Never Back Down. The U.S. release of the film kept the original title used when production began.
