= Kenji Haga =

Japanese television personality (born 1961)

- Born: Mikio Tōma; July 21, 1961 (age 65); Koza, USCAR (now Okinawa, Japan)
- Occupations: Television personality; actor; businessman
- Years active: 1981–2007
- Spouse: unnamed (2006-2016)

Mikio Tōma (當眞 美喜男, Tōma Mikio; born July 21, 1961), known professionally as Kenji Haga (羽賀 研二, Haga Kenji), is a Japanese television personality, actor and businessman. Haga was born in USCAR to an American father and a Japanese mother.

His relationship with Anna Umemiya during 1994-97 made headlines.

he married in 2006 but divorce in 2015 after having two daughters. On June 30, 2007, Haga was arrested along with four others including former world champion professional boxer Jiro Watanabe, actor Ginji Yoshikawa^{[jp]}, and two affiliates of the Yamaguchi-gumi syndicate; one Toshikazu Kawakita and the other unidentified. The group were arrested over allegedly blackmailing a real estate agent in Osaka into forgiving 400 million yen's worth of Haga's debt.

On February 10, 2026, Okinawa Prefectural Police arrested Haga on suspicion of sexual assault which occurred in March, 2025.

== Roles ==
=== Variety ===
- Kuniko Touch
- The Night of Hit Parade
- Zōjiroshi Quiz Hint zo Pint

=== Television drama ===
- Food Fight
- Handsome Man (Namihiko Kubō)
- Hasadai Shōgun Yoshimune (Tokugawa Tsugutomo)
- Hōjyō Tokimune (Rokuhara Tandai Hōjyō Tokishige)
- Kirawane Matsuko no Isshō (Detective Shiomi)
- Kodoku no Kake ~Itoshikihitoyo~ (Samuel Miyate)
- Kurama Tengu (xxxx) (Okita Sōji)
- Ryūkyū no Kaze: Dragon Spiri (Tomonaga Arakaki)
- Street Fighter II V (Ken Masters)
- The Kindaichi Case Files (1995)

=== Film ===
- Aladdin (Aladdin (speaking voice in 1993))
- Les Sous-doués (Julien)
- Seito Shokun (Shun Togishima)
- Sorekara (Kadono)
- Street Fighter II: The Animated Movie (Ken Masters)

=== Video ===
- The Return of Jafar (Aladdin (speaking voice in 1995))
- Sagi Shiippei series

=== Stage ===
- My Fair Lady
- The Sound of Music
