= Kofi Ansah =

Ghanaian fashion designer (1951–2014)

- Born: 6 July 1951; Ghana
- Died: 3 May 2014 (aged 62); Accra, Ghana
- Education: Chelsea School of Art
- Occupation: Fashion designer
- Spouse: Nicola Ansah
- Children: Joey Ansah, Ryan Ansah and Tanoa Sasraku

Kofi Ansah (6 July 1951 – 3 May 2014) was a Ghanaian fashion designer. He was considered a pioneer in promoting modern African styles and design on the international stage. He was married to Nicola Ansah and the father of actor Joey Ansah, Ryan Ansah and visual artist Tanoa Sasraku.

== Early life and education ==
Ansah was born in Ghana in 1951 into an artistic family and his interest in art and design was encouraged by his father, a photographer and classical musician.

Ansah studied at Chelsea School of Art, graduating in 1979 with a first-class honours degree in fashion design and distinction in design technology.

He initially made his name working on the UK fashion scene as he made headlines on his graduation when he made a beaded top for Princess Anne. In 1992 he returned to Ghana, where he set up and ran the successful design and creative concept company Artdress.

He was the founder and past president of the Federation of African Designers. Characteristic of his style was the use of quilting, embroidery and appliqué.

He died at Korle-Bu Teaching Hospital, aged 62, on 3 May 2014. His funeral was held in the forecourt of State House in Accra.

== Awards and recognitions ==
Ansah won the prestigious Ghana Quality Awards Diamond Division in October 2003, for clothing and textile with Artdress Ltd, and his company was the winner of the Millennium 2000 African Fashion Awards.

He also designed the anniversary fabric for the Ghana@50 Golden Jubilee Celebration. He designed the costumes for the opening and closing ceremonies of the 2008 African Cup of Nations staged in Ghana, and in 2009 was the chief designer at the Festival of African Fashion and Arts (FAFA).

He was posthumously honoured in November 2015 at the ETV Ghana Fashion Awards for his "immense contribution to the fashion industry and the prestige of the nation."
