= Raging Fighter =

1993 video game

- North American cover art
- Developer(s): Konami
- Publisher(s): Konami
- Director(s): Masashi Sakurai
- Producer(s): Hiroyuki Fukui
- Programmer(s): Masatsugu Nagata
- Artist(s): Masashi Sakurai; M. Sato
- Composer(s): Akihiro Juichiya
- Platform(s): Game Boy
- Release: JP: March 26, 1993; NA: June 1993; EU: 1993
- Genre(s): Fighting
- Mode(s): Single-player, multiplayer

Raging Fighter (Note: Known in Japan as Outburst (Japanese: アウトバースト)) is a 1993 fighting video game developed and published by Konami for the Nintendo Game Boy. It was first released in Japan on March 26, 1993, and later released in North America and Europe in June 1993.

== Gameplay ==
Redin is attempting a high kick against his opponent Vandal.

Raging Fighter plays similarly to other 2D versus fighting games from the time of its release. The player's character fights an opponent in best two-out-of-three matches in a single player tournament mode with the computer or against another human player. However, unlike most modern fighting games released at the time, instead of three to six buttons, there are two buttons: one for punching, the other for kicking. Depending on what direction the player presses when punching or kicking, the player can throw a different punch or kick with different properties that would be useful in different situations. For instance, there are three low kicks available if the player is crouching. Konami used this method to make the most of the Game Boy's two buttons.

There are four different game modes: Practice, Story, Tournament and Versus. There are also seven playable characters, each individually rated in strength, speed, defense, mobility, and endurance. An in-game meter can be filled out in the one-player tournament mode by not using long-range moves against the opponents. Depending on their skill throughout the tournament, the player can be rewarded with anything from a S-rank to an E-rank.

== Reception ==
Allgame gave the game a rating of 2 stars out of 5. German video game magazine Total! scored it a 3.75 out of 6.
