= Street Fighter: Resurrection =

British martial arts web series

- Genre: Action; Martial arts
- Based on: Street Fighter by Takashi Nishiyama; Hiroshi Matsumoto
- Developed by: Joey Ansah
- Written by: Joey Ansah
- Directed by: Joey Ansah
- Starring: Mike Moh; Christian Howard; Alain Moussi
- Composer: Patrick Gill
- Country of origin: United Kingdom
- Original language: English
- No. of episodes: 4

Production
- Executive producers: Jacqueline Quella; Joey Ansah; Jonathan Ford; Chad E. Gutstein; Yoshinori Ono; Daniel E. Tibbets; Mark Wooding
- Running time: 8-9 minutes (Miniseries)

Original release
- Network: Machinima.com go90
- Release: 15 March – 5 April 2016

Related
- Street Fighter: Assassin's Fist

Street Fighter: Resurrection is a British martial arts web series developed by Joey Ansah. The series is based on Capcom's Street Fighter video game series, its release coinciding with that of Street Fighter V to serve as a promotion. Resurrection is set ten years after Street Fighter: Assassin's Fist web series.

Episodes of the series were released weekly by Machinima via Verizon's go90 app from 15 March 2016 to 5 April 2016. The series was later uploaded to Machinima's YouTube channel on 19 December 2016.

== Cast ==
- Christian Howard as Ken Masters
- Mike Moh as Ryu
- Alain Moussi as Charlie Nash
- Natascha Hopkins as Laura Matsuda
- Katrina Durden as Decapre
- Amy Olivia Bell as Kolin
- Silvio Simac as M. Bison
- Alexis Rodney as Matt Furlong
- Cengiz Dervis as Agent Daniels
- Amed Hashimi as Agent Amari / Mr. Aziz

== Production ==
On December 6, 2015, a trailer for the mini series premiered during the Capcom Cup and Joey Ansah was also announced to be developing the series. The following day, martial arts actor Alain Moussi announced that he would be playing Charlie Nash, while Mike Moh and Christian Howard would reprise their roles from Assassin's Fist as Ryu and Ken. Production of the mini series wrapped up on December 15, 2015. Laura from Street Fighter V, Decapre from Street Fighter IV and Kolin from Street Fighter V also appear in the series portrayed by Natascha Hopkins, Katrina Durden and Amy Olivia Bell respectively.

== Music ==
The music was composed by Patrick Gill with contributions from Ryan Ansah and Daniel Braine.

== Episodes ==
No.	Title	Directed by	Written by	Original release date
1	"New Challenger"	Joey Ansah	Joey Ansah	15 March 2016 (go90); 19 December 2016 (YouTube)
Laura Matsuda is determined to prove herself on the world stage as a top tier fighter. She seeks the fighting challenge, and validation, of Street Fighter legend, Ken Masters. Challenge accepted! But is she in over her head as two mysterious strangers intervene?
2	"Fight & Flight"	Joey Ansah	Joey Ansah	22 March 2016
After a violent confrontation with the mysterious stranger, Laura has a tough decision to make. Ken and Ryu are called on to aid Interpol with an undercover arms deal in London. The appearance of a dangerous figure confirms worrying news.
3	"Mission Critical"	Joey Ansah	Joey Ansah	29 March 2016
Things spin out of control as Interpol's 'sting' unravels. In play is a potent new WMD. Laura and Nash intervene, but whose side are they on? All hell breaks loose as Nash goes on the warpath!
4	"Countdown"	Joey Ansah	Joey Ansah	5 April 2016
As Decapre escapes with the ‘Dark Hado Bomb’ only Laura stands in the way of the destruction of London. Can Charlie, Ryu and Ken get to her before it is too late?
