= Mike Moh =

American actor and martial artist

- Born: Michael Doughcoon Moh; August 19, 1983 (age 43); Atlanta, Georgia, U.S.
- Occupations: Actor; martial artist; stuntman
- Years active: 2006–present
- Spouse: Richelle Kondratowicz
- Children: 3

Michael Doughcoon Moh (born August 19, 1983) is an American actor and martial artist of Korean descent. A sixth degree black belt in American Taekwondo, Moh is perhaps best known for his roles as martial arts legend Bruce Lee in the 2019 film Once Upon a Time in Hollywood, and Ryu in the web series of Street Fighter: Assassin's Fist (2014) and Resurrection (2016) or in the FOX drama series Empire where he made a few appearances.

He also played Triton in the television series Inhumans.

Moh is also the founder of the LVLUP Martial Arts schools in Madison, Wisconsin.

== Personal life ==
Moh was born in Atlanta, Georgia to Korean parents. He grew up in Saint Paul, Minnesota, and attended the Carlson School of Management at the University of Minnesota, graduating with a degree in business marketing. He is married to Richelle Kondratowicz. They have two sons and a daughter.

== Filmography ==
=== Film ===
Year	Title	Role	Notes
2006	Robin-B-Hood	N/A	
2011	Where the Road Meets the Sun	Misaki's new love	
2014	School Dance	Tram	
2016	The Man from Death	Druglord Qing Heilong	
2019	Once Upon a Time in Hollywood	Bruce Lee	
2019	Killerman	Baracuta	
2021	Boogie	Melvin	
2022	Blade of the 47 Ronin	Reo	Streaming film
2023	Ghosted	Wagner	Streaming film

=== Television ===
Year	Title	Role	Notes
2009	Kamen Rider: Dragon Knight	Kamen Rider Axe / Danny Cho / Hunt	Recurring role, 17 episodes
2011	House M.D.	Waiter	
2011	Where the Road Meets the Sun	Stuntman	
2011	2 Broke Girls	Korean Hipster #1	
2012	The Johnnies	Mike	4 episodes
2012–2013	Supah Ninjas	Flint's Henchman / Ishina Ninja / Raymond / Running Robber	4 episodes
2014	Castle	Lee Tong	1 episode
2014	Street Fighter: Assassin's Fist	Ryu	Main role, all 12 episodes
2014	True Blood	Yakuza #1	1 episode; uncredited
2015–2017	Empire	Steve Cho	9 episodes
2016	Street Fighter: Resurrection	Ryu	Web miniseries
2017	Inhumans	Triton	3 episodes

=== Video games ===
- Shadow Warrior 3 (2022), as Lo Wang
