= Charlie Nash (Street Fighter) =

Street Fighter character

- Street Fighter character
- Promotional art of Charlie Nash in Street Fighter Alpha 3
- First appearance: As Charlie Blanka: Street Fighter (1994); As Charlie Nash: Street Fighter Alpha (1995)
- Portrayed by: Robert Mammone (1994); Chris Klein (2009); Alain Moussi (2016)

In-universe information
- Occupation: United States Air Force officer
- Nationality: American

Charlie Nash (Japanese: チャーリー・ナッシュ, romanized: Chārī Nasshu), known as Nash in Japan and as Charlie in early international releases, is a fictional character in Capcom's Street Fighter series of fighting games. He was initially established in Street Fighter II as the deceased military comrade whose killing by M. Bison motivates Guile to seek revenge. The film Street Fighter (1994) introduced Charlie as the original identity of Blanka, a concept continuing through to the 1995–1997 animated series but disregarded by all subsequent Street Fighter video games. Charlie Nash became a playable character in the prequel Street Fighter Alpha (1995), where he is depicted as a United States Air Force officer investigating Bison's criminal organization, Shadaloo.

Nash's original fighting style was derived from Guile's and included variations of the Sonic Boom and Somersault Kick. For Street Fighter V (2016), Capcom revived and substantially redesigned him, replacing his defensive charge-based style with more offensive movement and teleportation abilities. He has also appeared in Capcom crossover games and in film, animation and comic-book adaptations of Street Fighter. Critical discussion of Nash has focused on his evolution from an unseen element of Guile's backstory into a playable character, the numerous contradictory depictions of his death, and his reinvention in Street Fighter V.

== Conception and development ==
The character was called Nash in the Japanese version of the series and Charlie in overseas releases. According to Capcom staff interviewed by Matt Leone, the international name was suggested by Capcom's American branch because Nash was not considered a natural-sounding name for an American character. Licensed works, particularly Udon Entertainment's comics, later combined the two versions into the full name Charlie Nash. Capcom formally used that name for Street Fighter V, although the character is primarily referred to as Nash within the game.

Capcom first depicted Nash as a playable fighter in Street Fighter Alpha, a prequel set before Street Fighter II. He was designed as an Air Force officer investigating corruption within the United States military and its connections to Shadaloo. His moves were based on Guile's but were animated and executed differently; Nash performed his Sonic Boom with one arm and used a more extended version of Guile's upward Somersault Kick. His yellow vest, green cargo pants, glasses and large blond forelock became the basis of his appearances throughout the Alpha series and Capcom's crossover games.

Nash was absent from the main series until Street Fighter V. Executive producer Yoshinori Ono said Nash's reveal was deliberately used to indicate the broader direction of Street Fighter V. Rather than presenting the game as another expansion of Street Fighter IV, Nash's early reveal, which showcased his unfamiliar appearance and revised mechanics, is intended to signal that the sequel would reconsider several of the preceding game's assumptions. Ono attributed Nash's return to the series due to strong fan demand, although he had frequently been omitted because of the similarity between his techniques and Guile's.

Director Takayuki Nakayama said that Capcom had decided from the beginning of production that Nash and Guile would both appear in Street Fighter V. Because both had previously relied on the Sonic Boom, Somersault attacks and charge inputs, the developers believed that retaining overlapping battle concepts would make their inclusion redundant. Nash's prior death gave the team a narrative opportunity to recreate him around a new fighting style and communicate that he was no longer the same character mechanically. His redesigned body is visibly reconstructed with discoloured sections of skin, surgical staples and a jewel embedded in his forehead. Nash's charge-based commands from his previous playable iteration were largely replaced with directional inputs, forward-moving attacks, projectile absorption and teleportation. Nakayama explained that reducing charge moves allowed characters to attack more actively and gave the developers greater freedom to emphasize individual fighting styles.

== Appearances ==
=== Video games ===
Nash is first mentioned but not shown in Street Fighter II. In Guile's ending, Guile confronts M. Bison over the death of a military comrade called Charlie, establishing Nash as the principal motivation for Guile's vendetta against Shadaloo. Later games identify Nash as Guile's close friend and fellow United States Air Force officer.

Nash first appears as a playable character in Street Fighter Alpha, a prequel to Street Fighter II. He investigates Shadaloo and corruption within the United States military while pursuing Bison. After defeating Bison, Nash is attacked while attempting to call for military support. Street Fighter Alpha 2 gives him a different death: after defeating Bison, Nash is betrayed by corrupt military personnel, shot from a helicopter and sent falling from a cliff. Chris Plante of The Verge observed that the differing scenes were successive attempts to preserve the premise that Nash had died before the events of Street Fighter II.

Nash returns in Street Fighter Alpha 3. His arcade ending allows him to survive after destroying Bison's Psycho Drive, while later home versions introduce Guile and depict Nash remaining inside Shadaloo's base as it explodes so that Guile can escape. Jasper noted that the games repeatedly supplied Nash with incompatible deaths, creating a recurring continuity problem whenever Capcom revisited the period preceding Street Fighter II.

He subsequently appears in the crossover fighting games X-Men vs. Street Fighter and Marvel vs. Capcom 2: New Age of Heroes. An altered version named Shadow is a hidden character in Marvel Super Heroes vs. Street Fighter. Shadow uses Nash's general appearance and fighting style but is depicted as a Shadaloo-controlled fighter empowered by Psycho Power. He later appears as an assist character in Marvel vs. Capcom: Clash of Super Heroes, including in the endings of Chun-Li and Shadow Lady. Nash is also playable in the crossover shooter Cannon Spike and was planned for the cancelled fighting game Capcom Fighting All-Stars.

The storylines of Guile and Abel in Street Fighter IV allude to the continued uncertainty surrounding Nash's death. Guile continues searching for information about his former comrade, while Abel recognizes Guile's Sonic Boom technique and associates it with a man connected to Shadaloo.

Nash returns as a playable character in Street Fighter V. He is revived by the Secret Society under the direction of Helen, later revealed to be Kolin, using the body of the prototype artificial humanoid Eleven to reconstruct his damaged body. The procedure leaves him with a limited lifespan and a body visibly assembled from discoloured sections of skin held together by surgical staples. Initially concerned only with killing Bison, Nash attacks several of his former allies while seeking chess-piece devices capable of countering Shadaloo's Black Moon satellites.

During the cinematic story A Shadow Falls, Nash eventually cooperates with Karin Kanzuki's group after learning that Shadaloo intends to use the Black Moons to spread fear and increase Bison's Psycho Power. He confronts Bison after the other fighters disable the satellites, but is unable to defeat him. Nash expends the remaining energy sustaining his reconstructed body in an attempt to destroy Bison, weakening him before Ryu defeats him using the Power of Nothingness.

=== Other media ===
Adaptations have repeatedly reinterpreted Nash's appearance, identity and relationship with Guile. In the 1994 live-action film Street Fighter, Nash and Blanka are combined into Carlos "Charlie" Blanka, a soldier serving under Guile. Bison captures Charlie and orders Dhalsim to transform him into a genetically engineered super-soldier. Dhalsim secretly alters the procedure so that Charlie retains part of his humanity. After being released, the mutated Charlie initially attacks Guile but eventually recognizes him and fights against Bison's forces. The American animated series based on the film retained the Charlie–Blanka amalgamation, although one episode temporarily restores him to a human appearance influenced by Nash's design in the Alpha games.

Nash is referenced as Guile's murdered friend in Street Fighter II: The Animated Movie. The anime series Street Fighter II V instead depicts him as an operative who joins Guile in an attempt to rescue Ken from Shadaloo. Bison kills Nash during the operation, providing Guile with his motive to fight him. Because the series was produced while Street Fighter Alpha was in development, this version has brown hair and a beard and bears little resemblance to the finished game design.

In Street Fighter: The Legend of Chun-Li (2009), Chris Klein portrays Charlie Nash as an Interpol agent investigating Bison and Shadaloo. Jasper strongly criticized the film but described Klein's exaggerated performance as one of its most memorable features.

Nash later serves as the central threat in the live-action web miniseries Street Fighter: Resurrection, portrayed by Alain Moussi. Set shortly before Street Fighter V, the series follows Ryu, Ken and Laura as they investigate attacks committed by the recently revived Nash. Director Joey Ansah said he selected Nash because the character's resurrection and willingness to attack allies as well as enemies made him an ambiguous antihero. Ansah considered that moral uncertainty appropriate for the darker tone he wanted for the adaptation and said Nash's return had been one of the few elements of Street Fighter V available when the project entered development.

In 2026's Street Fighter, Guile mentioned Charlie and is wearing his dogtag.

Masaomi Kanzaki's manga adaptation of Street Fighter II gives Nash another death, depicting him as a soldier driven violently insane by a mind-control experiment and killed by Guile to prevent him from attacking civilians. In Udon Entertainment's Street Fighter comics, Charlie is established as Nash's given name and he is presented as Guile's friend and mentor. Bison captures him and transforms him into Shadow, but Nash eventually recovers his memories and sacrifices himself while fighting Bison. Udon later published the one-shot Street Fighter V: The Life and Death(s) of Charlie Nash, which presents its own account of Nash's reconstruction before Street Fighter V.

== Reception and analysis ==
Critical commentary has frequently focused on Nash's recurring deaths and the difficulty of reconciling his function in Guile's backstory with his continued appearances. Gavin Jasper of Den of Geek observed that while the character's original purpose was to motivate Guile, his death eventually occupied an important place in the series' developing narrative. Jasper described Nash as a character fundamentally defined by being dead, and that his resurrection and prominent use in the promotion of Street Fighter V particularly striking because most of the series' established characters had remained comparatively static. Plante of The Verge similarly described Nash's history as a "morbid loop" within the series' mythology. He noted that Capcom repeatedly attempted to preserve the premise that Nash died before Street Fighter II, but supplied substantially different deaths in the Alpha games. Plante argued that the resulting contradictions illustrated the difficulty of maintaining a continuing narrative across fighting-game sequels, prequels and revisions. Dawson described Nash as a "tortured soul" who had traditionally remained in Guile's shadow despite having his own following. He considered the standardized name, reconstructed appearance and abandonment of the Guile-derived fighting style to be interconnected parts of Nash's transformation for Street Fighter V. detikInet described the returned Nash as more severe and intimidating than his earlier incarnation, connecting the character's harsher appearance and new abilities like teleporting to evade a projectile before attacking his opponent from behind with the effort to reintroduce him after a long absence.

Nash's revised gameplay was generally discussed as an effort to separate him from Guile. Bryan Dawson of Prima Games said the redesign ended Nash's previous status as a Guile clone, observing that the two characters could now coexist because they played substantially differently. Dawson also connected the changes to Nash's altered physical condition and the mysterious force apparently sustaining him. GamesBeat similarly described Nash as the most radically altered returning fighter in the early Street Fighter V roster, observing that his non-charge commands, forward movement, projectile absorption and teleportation shifted him away from his previous reputation as a Guile derivative into a distinct offensive character. Dawson said the characters now played differently despite retaining related projectile attacks, and highlighted Nash's ability to absorb projectiles and teleport around an opponent to create ambiguous attacks.

Writing for Eurogamer, Wesley Yin-Poole praised Nash's reimagining, contrasting him with his earlier resemblance to Guile. The review described Nash as an aggressive rushdown fighter rather than a charge-based character, praised the variety of his attacks and highlighted his ability to reduce an opponent's EX Gauge as players developed strategies around the mechanic. Yin-Poole also praised smaller animation details that distinguished his personality, including dismissive reactions to ineffective attacks. Edward Dang of Hardcore Gamer considered Nash suitable for players who preferred varying their offence and maintaining pressure on an opponent. Dang said effective Nash players would need to understand which attacks could be linked together while remaining prepared to defend, and also noted his ability to drain an opponent's health and Critical Art meter. Capcom's developers identified differentiation from Guile as the principal reason for rebuilding Nash's battle concept, using his resurrection to connect the character's altered story, appearance and gameplay.

Nash also became prominent during the first year of competitive Street Fighter V. At the 2016 Evolution Championship Series, Lee "Infiltration" Seon-woo used Nash to win the first Street Fighter V world championship. Two other Nash players, Atsushi "Yukadon" Fujimura and Joe "L.I. Joe" Ciaramelli, placed third and joint fifth respectively, meaning that three of the tournament's top five competitors used the character. Nash became less common in professional play after balance changes introduced for the game's second season. Red Bull reported that many players believed the character had been excessively weakened and abandoned him, while Japanese professional Masato "Bonchan" Takahashi continued using him and acquired the nickname "The Last Nash". Bonchan said he understood why other competitors had changed characters, but suggested Nash's reduced use could itself become an advantage because opponents were less likely to practice against him.

The character has appeared in rankings and popularity surveys. In 2010, Paul Furfari of UGO Networks ranked Charlie 26th among 50 Street Fighter characters. Furfari described him as an important driver of the series' storyline and one of its longest continuing narrative threads, while noting his close mechanical relationship with Guile. In Capcom's worldwide character popularity poll conducted in 2017 and 2018, Nash placed 57th. Guinness World Records separately listed Nash as the third-most-used character in an early analysis of Street Fighter V player selections, behind Ryu and Karin. European fighting-game champion Ryan Hart placed Nash 13th in a list of his 20 favourite Street Fighter characters published by The Guardian. Hart preferred Nash to Guile because Nash's attacks could be linked into longer and more technically demanding combinations in the Alpha games.
