= Joey Ansah =

British actor and martial artist (born 1982)

- Born: 24 November 1982 (age 43); London, England
- Occupations: Actor; martial artist; stuntman; fight choreographer; producer; director
- Parent: Kofi Ansah (father)

Joey Ansah (born 24 November 1982) is an English actor, martial artist, stuntman and director best known for his roles in The Bourne Ultimatum (2007), Street Fighter: Assassin's Fist (2014) and The Old Guard (2020).

== Early life and education ==
Joey Ansah was born in the borough of Hackney, London, England, of mixed ethnicity, the second son of Ghanaian fashion designer Kofi Ansah and his Devon-born wife Nicola. Between the ages of 10 and 15, he lived in Ghana and studied Tae Kwon Do for four years. Upon returning to England, Ansah began to audition for stunt roles in films, drawing inspiration from Ray Park's performance as Darth Maul in 1999.

== Career ==
Ansah's first important role as an actor was in the UK indie film Love Struck (2005). Notable appearances on British TV followed in episodes of BBC productions Spooks (2005) and Timewatch (2006).

Ansah went on to play a minor role as one of the Shadow Warriors in Batman Begins (2005). However, his most noteworthy role to date came in 2007, when he appeared in The Bourne Ultimatum as Desh Bouksani, an assassin tracking down Jason Bourne. Ansah's performance was notable for an extended set-piece fight scene between himself and Matt Damon, regarded by one reviewer as one of the best ever filmed, in which Ansah performed all of his own stunts. In 2008 he was nominated for an MTV Film Award in the "Best Fight" category.

Ansah has also acted in British independent martial arts films, such as Left for Dead (2004) and Underground (2007).

He choreographed, co-wrote and directed the 2010 short film Street Fighter: Legacy. A self-proclaimed fan of the video game series, Ansah wanted the short to be the most accurate depiction of the series, different from the two theatrically released films. He and collaborator Christian Howard, with whom he worked on SFL, worked on the live-action Street Fighter series Street Fighter: Assassin's Fist, and they are developing a second season titled Street Fighter: World Warrior and Street Fighter: Resurrection.

== Filmography ==
=== Film ===
| Year | Title | Role | Notes |
|---|---|---|---|
| 2004 | Creep | Marcus | |
| 2005 | Left for Dead | Kickboxer 1 | |
| 2005 | Love Struck | Mango | |
| 2005 | Batman Begins | League of Shadows member | |
| 2007 | Voyage: Killing Brigitte Nielsen | Joey | TV film |
| 2007 | The Bourne Ultimatum | Desh Bouksani | |
| 2007 | Underground | Joey, The Model | |
| 2009 | Ghost Town | Bonesera | TV film |
| 2009 | Hit Girls | James | |
| 2010 | Street Fighter: Legacy | Akuma | Co-writer and co-director |
| 2010 | Knock Out | Fighter | |
| 2011 | Attack the Block | Policeman 1 | |
| 2012 | Snow White and the Huntsman | Aldan | |
| 2012 | I, Anna | Bull | |
| 2013 | UFO | Police officer / Black-ops soldier | |
| 2013 | Green Street 3: Never Back Down | Victor | |
| 2013 | The Numbers Station | Derne | |
| 2017 | How to Talk to Girls at Parties | PT Bob | |
| 2018 | Mission: Impossible – Fallout | Henchman | |
| 2019 | The Kid Who Would Be King | Police officer | |
| 2019 | Aladdin | Jafar's guard (uncredited) / stunt performer | |
| 2020 | The Old Guard | Keane | |
| 2024 | Hounds of War | Milktooth | |
| 2025 | The Running Man | Captain Holloway | |
| 2025 | The Islander | Milius | |

=== Series ===
| Year | Title | Role |
|---|---|---|
| 2004 | Starhyke | Fight coordinator and cameo |
| 2005 | Spooks (MI-5) | Abbud |
| 2006 | Gideon's Daughter | Diesel |
| 2006 | Timewatch | Emperor Geta |
| 2014 | Street Fighter: Assassin's Fist | Akuma, co-writer, co-director |
| 2016 | Street Fighter: Resurrection | Writer, director |
| 2020 | The Stranger | Stuart Hope |
| 2022 | Slow Horses | Agent Pierce |
| 2023 | Who Is Erin Carter? | Alec Fenwick |

== Awards and nominations ==
| Year | Award | Category | Nominated work | Result |
|---|---|---|---|---|
| 2008 | 17th MTV Movie Awards | Best Fight (shared with Matt Damon) | The Bourne Ultimatum | Nominated |
