= Street Fighter: Assassin's Fist =

British martial arts web series

- Genre: Action; Martial arts
- Based on: Street Fighter by Takashi Nishiyama; Hiroshi Matsumoto
- Developed by: Joey Ansah; Christian Howard
- Written by: Joey Ansah; Christian Howard
- Directed by: Joey Ansah
- Starring: Mike Moh; Christian Howard; Akira Koieyama; Shogen Itokazu; Gaku Space; Hyunri Lee; Togo Igawa; Mark Killeen; Hal Yamanouchi; Joey Ansah
- Composer: Patrick Gill
- Country of origin: United Kingdom
- Original languages: English; Japanese
- No. of episodes: 12 (web series); 6 (TV series); 1 (movie edition)

Production
- Producer: Jacqueline Quella
- Running time: 12 minutes (web series); 22 minutes (TV series); 105 minutes (movie edition: TV); 145 minutes (movie edition: DVD/Blu-Ray)

Original release
- Network: YouTube; Machinima.com
- Release: 23 May 2014

Related
- Street Fighter: Legacy

Street Fighter: Assassin's Fist is a British martial arts web series developed by Joey Ansah and Christian Howard. Based on Capcom's Street Fighter video game series, it is the third live-action adaptation of the game franchise. The story focuses on Ryu and Ken as they uncover the past of their master, Gouken, and learn the secrets of their dark art, Ansatsuken.

The web series was released on Machinima's YouTube channel on 23 May 2014. It was recompiled into a 6-episode television series and film, with IFC Films releasing the film on 7 January 2015.

A sequel series, Street Fighter: World Warrior, which would have seen Ryu and Ken come into conflict with M. Bison and Shadaloo, was in development, but was eventually scrapped in favour of Street Fighter: Resurrection, which served as a tie-in to Street Fighter V.

== Cast ==
- Akira Koieyama as Gouken
  - Shogen as Young Gouken
- Christian Howard as Ken Masters
- Mike Moh as Ryu
- Togo Igawa as Goutetsu / Goma
- Gaku Space as Gouki
  - Joey Ansah as Older Gouki / Akuma
- Hyunri as Sayaka, Gouki's love interest
- Mark Killeen as Mr. Masters
- Hal Yamanouchi as Senzo

Street Fighter IV producer Yoshinori Ono makes a cameo appearance as a fight promoter.

== Production ==
The short film Street Fighter: Legacy, a passion project for Joey Ansah and Christian Howard, was released on YouTube in 2010 as a proof-of-concept. During San Diego Comic-Con in 2012 Capcom announced it had granted rights to the creators to go ahead with the project.

The series started a Kickstarter crowdsource funding campaign in order to source funds for production. The campaign was cancelled on 17 April 2013 when private backers stepped forward with the money necessary, removing the need for the crowdsource funds.

On 14 July 2013, production began filming in Simeonovo, Sofia, Bulgaria. On 24 August 2013, filming on the series wrapped. The music was composed by Patrick Gill with contributions from Ryan Ansah and Daniel Braine.

On 20 August 2013, in an interview with Gamereactor, Ansah talked about Ryu and Ken's story and said "a good analogy with Ryu is that he's not actually ever competing with anyone else; he's competing with himself. Whereas Ken is driven fiercely by competition. A lot of Ken's conflict comes from his relationship with his father. Without giving too much away, we learn in this series how Ken came to be in Japan, in Gouken's dojo".

On 1 November 2013 Content has sold worldwide online rights for Street Fighter: Assassin's Fist to a major global online channel for a short first window. On 14 March 2014 Capcom and Machinima.com announced that the series would be airing on Machinima's main channel.

== Home media ==
Funimation acquired the home video distribution rights and released the web series on DVD and Blu-ray under their Giant Ape label. Madman Entertainment and Manga Entertainment released the series in Australia and the UK, respectively.

== Episodes ==
=== "Alpha" (2014) ===
Title	Directed by	Written by	Original release date
"Alpha"	Joey Ansah	Joey Ansah & Christian Howard	23 May 2014
Flash forward in this prologue to find best of friends and bitterest of rivals Ryu and Ken face off in a potentially lethal showdown. How did it come to this?

=== Season 1 (2014) ===
No.	Title	Directed by	Written by	Original release date
1	"Beginnings"	Joey Ansah	Joey Ansah & Christian Howard	23 May 2014
As Ryu and Ken near the end of their training they are impatient to master the power of "Hadō". Their master, Gōken, worries about sharing these powerful techniques. Gōken sets Ryu and Ken on a quest to find Gōtetsu's dōjō where he trained.
2	"Round 1: Fight"	Joey Ansah	Joey Ansah & Christian Howard	23 May 2014
At Gōtetsu's dōjō, Gōken, Ryu and Ken pay homage at Gōtetsu's grave. Ken and Ryu discover something secret in Gōken's past. Gōken recalls his own time spent training alongside his brother Gōki under their master Gōtetsu. Ryu and Ken fight in a sparring match.
3	"Satsui No Hado"	Joey Ansah	Joey Ansah & Christian Howard	23 May 2014
In the past, Gōtetsu instructs the young Gōken and Gōki. Goki is drawn to the power of "Satsui no Hadō". In the present, Ryu and Ken try to create their first Hadōken. Gōken is disturbed by Ken's approach and they argue. Ryu and Ken learn more about the history of Ansatsuken, their master Gōken and his dead brother Gōki.
4	"A Rough Night"	Joey Ansah	Joey Ansah & Christian Howard	23 May 2014
Ryu is disturbed and sees a foreboding stranger in his nightmares. Ryu and Ken sneak out for adventure at the nearby town's G.I. bar. Ken's father makes a surprise visit. Ryu is unsettled by the old dōjō.
5	"Banished"	Joey Ansah	Joey Ansah & Christian Howard	23 May 2014
Gōken and Gōki vie for Sayaka's attention. Gōki uses Satsui no Hadō in a sparring match against Gōken, almost killing his opponent. Gōtetsu gives Gōki an ultimatum after his abuse of Satsui no Hadō, and expels him from the dōjō. Gōki and Sayaka part.
6	"Demons Within"	Joey Ansah	Joey Ansah & Christian Howard	23 May 2014
Ryu and Ken continue to work on their Hadōken, but Ryu is troubled and refuses to fully manifest his after accidentally striking Ken with it. Something is learnt of Ryu's past. A mysterious stranger appears to Gōken.
7	"Path of the Shin Oni"	Joey Ansah	Joey Ansah & Christian Howard	23 May 2014
In the past, we see events from Gōki's perspective as he finds a new home. Gōken and Sayaka become estranged.
8	"The Ultimate Sacrifice"	Joey Ansah	Joey Ansah & Christian Howard	23 May 2014
Gōki's fatalistic pursuit of Dark Hadō takes him to new dangerous levels. Gōtetsu and Gōken seriously debate the risks vs the benefits of the Satsui no Hadō.
9	"The Calm Before the Storm"	Joey Ansah	Joey Ansah & Christian Howard	23 May 2014
Gōtetsu and Gōken consult the Ansatsuken scrolls and discuss Gōki's departure. They question the very real potential of Ansatsuken myths becoming reality. Gōtetsu confronts a dark presence.
10	"The Raging Demon"	Joey Ansah	Joey Ansah & Christian Howard	23 May 2014
More is learnt of the fate of Gōtetsu, Gōki and Sayaka. Returning to Gōken's dōjō, Ryu and Ken continue to train, improving their techniques, their Hadōken becoming more advanced.
11	"May the Best Man Win"	Joey Ansah	Joey Ansah & Christian Howard	23 May 2014
As Ryu and Ken's training approaches a climax, Gōken sets them in a "rite of passage" which will culminate in the greatest challenge of their lives.
12	"End Game"	Joey Ansah	Joey Ansah & Christian Howard	23 May 2014
With a near fatality, tensions are high as Gōken is forced to make the hardest decision of his life as an outside force draws closer. The dōjō will never be the same again.

== Reception ==
In contrast to the poor reception of previous live-action Street Fighter films, Assassin's Fist has been acclaimed as the best and most faithful adaptation of the franchise. On the review-aggregator site, Rotten Tomatoes, while there is no critics' ratings, Assassin's Fist currently has a 94% audience approval rating. IGN gave the series a positive review, stating that it was more authentic to the franchise than either of the larger budgeted Street Fighter feature films, as well as one of the best live-action video-game adaptations overall, rating it an 8.7/10.

Shehzaan Abdulla from Continue-Play gave it a score of 8/10 and said, "Balancing in-jokes and fan service with humble, down-to-earth storytelling isn’t easy. Go too far in one direction and you end up with a hokey, pandering mess; go too far in the other, and you have a feature that feels disconnected, and uninspired by the source material. Assassin’s Fist walks this line almost perfectly."
