= Akoya Sogi =

Japanese voice actress (born 1968)

- 曽木 亜古弥
- Born: Yasuyo Sogi; September 27, 1968 (age 56); Kyoto, Japan
- Occupation: Voice actress
- Agent: Ricomotion

Akoya Sogi (曽木 亜古弥, Sogi Akoya, born Yasuyo Sogi (曽木 康代, Sogi Yasuyo), September 27, 1968) is a Japanese voice actress currently associated with the Ricomotion voice actor agency. Sogi is noted for her role as Mai Shiranui in the Fatal Fury, Capcom vs. SNK and King of Fighters fighting game series (which she also revoiced in The King of Fighters: Another Day anime). Although mainly only recognized for her role as Mai, Sogi is a prolific actress in various other entertainment fields. She has appeared in Japanese TV dramas, live-action movies and stage plays, and has made appearances in a few television commercials.

== Filmography ==
=== Anime ===
- The King of Fighters: Another Day (2005) – Mai Shiranui

=== Video games ===
- Fatal Fury 2 (1992) – Mai Shiranui
- Fatal Fury Special (1993) – Mai Shiranui
- The King of Fighters '94 (1994) – Mai Shiranui
- Fatal Fury 3: Road to the Final Victory (1995) – Mai Shiranui
- The King of Fighters '95 (1995) – Mai Shiranui
- Real Bout Fatal Fury (1995) – Mai Shiranui
- The King of Fighters '96 (1996) – Mai Shiranui
- Real Bout Fatal Fury Special (1997) – Mai Shiranui
- The King of Fighters '97 (1997) – Mai Shiranui
- Real Bout Fatal Fury 2: The Newcomers (1998) – Mai Shiranui
- The King of Fighters '98 (1998) – Mai Shiranui
- The King of Fighters: Kyo (1998) – Mai Shiranui
- Fatal Fury: Wild Ambition (1999) – Mai Shiranui
- The King of Fighters '99 (1999) – Mai Shiranui
- The King of Fighters 2000 (2000) – Mai Shiranui
- Capcom vs. SNK: Millennium Fight 2000 (2000) – Mai Shiranui
- Capcom vs. SNK 2: Millionaire Fighting 2001 (2001) – Mai Shiranui
- The King of Fighters 2001 (2001) – Mai Shiranui
- The King of Fighters 2002 (2002) – Mai Shiranui
- SNK vs. Capcom: SVC Chaos (2003) – Mai Shiranui
- The King of Fighters 2003 (2003) – Mai Shiranui
- KOF: Maximum Impact (2004) – Mai Shiranui
- The King of Fighters NeoWave (2005) – Mai Shiranui
- NeoGeo Battle Coliseum (2005) – Mai Shiranui
- The King of Fighters XI (2005) – Mai Shiranui
- KOF: Maximum Impact 2 (2006) – Mai Shiranui
