= Anairis Quiñones =

American voice actress (born 1997)

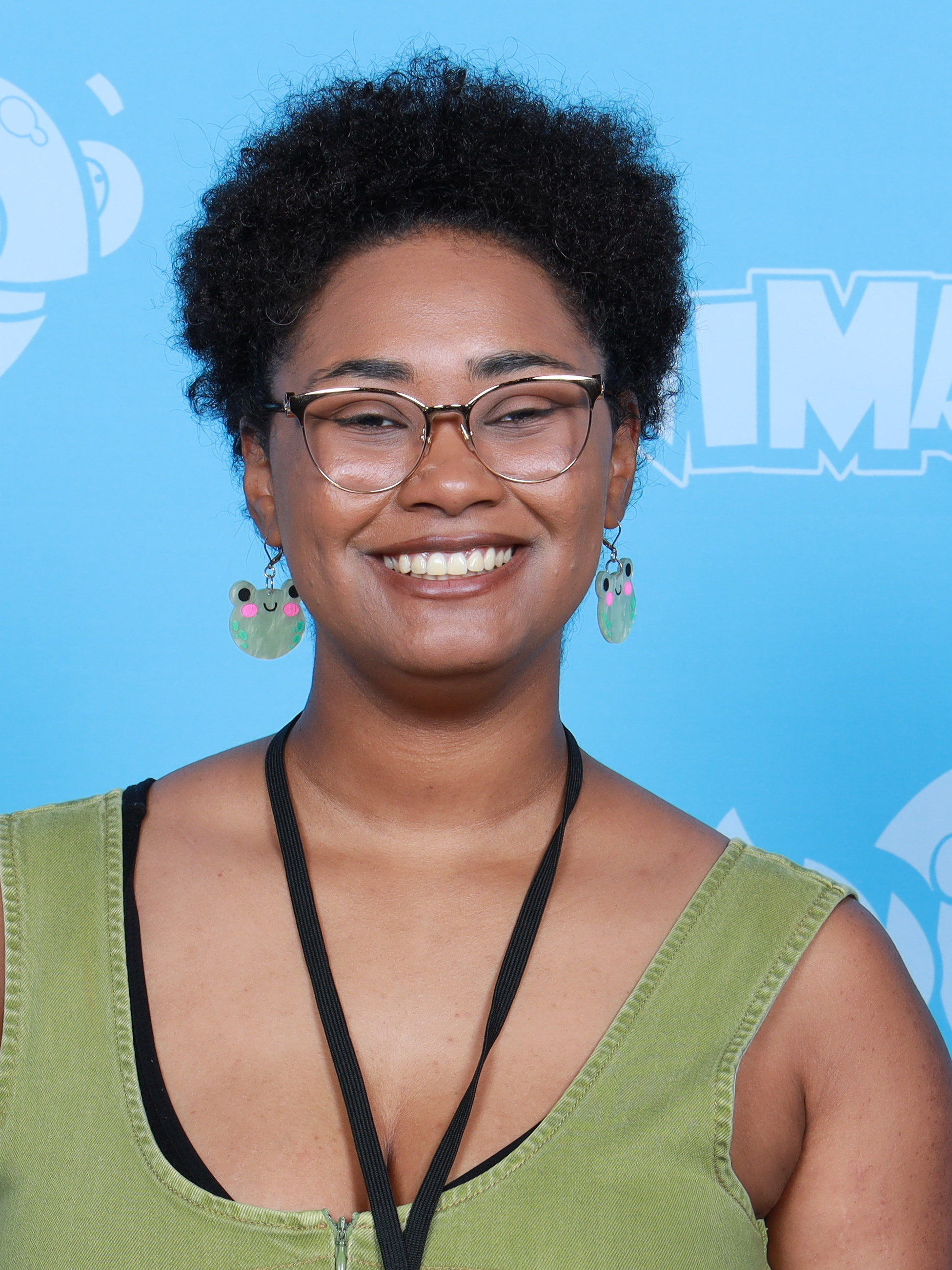
- Quiñones in 2024
- Born: September 16, 1997 (age 29); Florida, U.S.
- Occupation: Voice actress
- Years active: 2009–present
- Notable credits: My Hero Academia as Mirko; The Irregular at Magic High School as Miyuki Shiba; Re:Zero − Starting Life in Another World as Echidna; Wonder Egg Priority as Rika Kawai; Pokémon: Twilight Wings as Nessa; D4DJ First Mix as Rei Togetsu; Genshin Impact as Lynette; Honkai: Star Rail as Feixiao
- Website: www.anairisq.com

Anairis Quiñones (born September 16, 1997) is an American voice actress. After watching several anime dubs as a child, Quiñones was inspired to pursue a career in voice acting, which she began in 2009. Some of her noteworthy roles include Mirko in My Hero Academia, Miyuki Shiba in The Irregular at Magic High School, Echidna in Re:Zero − Starting Life in Another World, Rika Kawai in Wonder Egg Priority, Rei Togetsu in D4DJ First Mix, Nessa in Pokémon: Twilight Wings, and Kimberly in Street Fighter 6.

== Biography ==
Quiñones was born in Florida on September 16, 1997. Growing up, Quiñones was a fan of the Pokémon and Yu-Gi-Oh! series. However, what inspired her to pursue a career in voice acting was the English dub of Fullmetal Alchemist, specifically the performance by Laura Bailey as Lust. Quiñones started voice acting in 2009 and booked her first anime role in 2018 in Kemono Friends. In doing so, she moved from Florida to Texas before moving to California.

Quiñones identifies as non-binary. She uses she/her and they/them pronouns.

== Filmography ==
=== Anime ===
List of voice performances in anime
Year	Title	Role	Notes	Source
2019	Kemono Friends	Crested Porcupine		
2020	Pokémon: Twilight Wings	Nessa		
2020–21	Re:Zero − Starting Life in Another World	Echidna		
2020–24	The Irregular at Magic High School	Miyuki Shiba		
2020–25	My Hero Academia	Rumi "Mirko" Usagiyama		
2020–25	Our Last Crusade or the Rise of a New World	Elletear Lou Nebulis IX		
2021	Log Horizon	Nazuna		
2021	Black Rock Shooter	Arata		
2021	D4DJ First Mix	Rei Togetsu		
2021	Wonder Egg Priority	Rika Kawai		
2021	To Your Eternity	Sandel, Fushi (Mole), Tonari's Mother		
2021	How a Realist Hero Rebuilt the Kingdom	Liscia Elfrieden		
2021	Kageki Shojo!!	Kaoru's Female Classmates		
2021–22	I've Been Killing Slimes for 300 Years and Maxed Out My Level	Eno		
2021–Present	Attack on Titan	Yelena		
2021–Present	Horimiya	Yuki Yoshikawa		
2021–Present	Record of Ragnarok	Goll		
2022	Lycoris Recoil	Erika Janome		
2022	Odd Taxi	Yuki Mitsuya (real)		
2022	Sasaki and Miyano	Eimi Yokota		
2022	Gal & Dino	Yamada		
2022	Fate/Grand Carnival	Queen Medb, Announcer		
2022	Kakegurui Twin	Sakura Miharutaki		
2022	Engage Kiss	Sharon Holygrail		Official website
2022–24	Demon Slayer: Kimetsu no Yaiba	Hinatsuru		
2022–present	Bleach: Thousand-Year Blood War	Hiyori Sarugaki, Mera Hiuchigashima, Yoruichi Shihōin	Quiñones only voiced Yoruichi in episode 22.	
2023	Bastard!! Heavy Metal, Dark Fantasy	Shella E. Lee		
2023	Goblin Slayer	Noble Fencer		
2024	Undead Unluck	Chikara's Mother		
2024	Delicious in Dungeon	Female Students, Kiki		
2024	Boruto: Naruto Next Generations	Eida		
2024	Mission: Yozakura Family	Akari Asano, Momiji Akikaze, Me-chan		
2024	Dandadan	Muko		
2024	Beyblade X	Multi Nana-iro		
2025	Mobile Suit Gundam GQuuuuuuX	Nyaan		
2025	Bullet/Bullet	Silent Killer Lisa		
2026	Jujutsu Kaisen	Rika Orimoto		
2026	Digimon Beatbreak	Hotaruko Kanuma		
2026	Goodbye, Lara	Mari		

=== Films ===
List of voice performances in films
Year	Title	Role	Notes	Source
2020	Goblin Slayer: Goblin's Crown	Noble Fencer		
2021	Sword Art Online Progressive: Aria of a Starless Night	Mito		
2022	Jujutsu Kaisen 0	Rika Orimoto		
2023	Deemo: Memorial Keys	Alice		
2023	Sword Art Online Progressive: Scherzo of Deep Night	Kei-San		
2023	Dora and the Fantastical Creatures	Arcoiris, Luna	Short film	
2026	Cosmic Princess Kaguya!	Otako the Loyal Dog		

=== Video games ===
List of voice performances in video games
Year	Title	Role	Notes	Source
2017	Fire Emblem Heroes	Nifl, Karin		
2017	Regalia: Of Men and Monarchs	Esther		
2019	My Time at Portia	Ursula		
2019	Gibbous - A Cthulhu Adventure	Peace Busara, Piscilla		
2020	Dunk Lords	Hope		
2020	Heart of the Woods	Fairies		
2020	Monster Prom 2: Monster Camp	The Goddess, Wanda, Belle		
2020	Dauntless	Queen Linnea Silver		
2021	Cookie Run: Kingdom	Strawberry Cookie		
2021	Ys IX: Monstrum Nox	Saradhi, Silhouette		
2021	New Pokémon Snap	Rita		
2021	Guardian Tales	Eleanor		
2022	Arcade Spirits: The New Challengers	Valkyrie		
2022	AI: The Somnium Files – Nirvana Initiative	Tama		
2022	Goddess of Victory: Nikke	Centi, Sugar	Credited in-game	
2022	River City Girls 2	Kozuki, NOIZE	Credited in-game	
2023	Street Fighter 6	Kimberly		
2023	Anonymous;Code	Momo		
2023	Genshin Impact	Lynette		
2023	Rune Factory 3 Special	Shara		
2023	Detective Pikachu Returns	Jessica Miller		
2023	Astral Ascent	Aries		
2024	WWE 2K24	Carly Prime		
2024	Cookie Run: Witch's Castle	Strawberry Cookie		
2024	Demon Slayer: Kimetsu no Yaiba – Sweep the Board	Hinatsuru		
2024	Final Fantasy XIV	Nostalgia, Wayakkwe, Honey B. Lovely	Dawntrail expansion	
2024	The Legend of Heroes: Trails Through Daybreak	Viola, Citizens, Holo Core		
2024	Visions of Mana	Hinna		
2024	Honkai: Star Rail	Feixiao		
2024	Skullgirls Mobile	Roxie		
2024	A Quiet Place: The Road Ahead	Alex Taylor		
2024	Romancing SaGa 2: Revenge of the Seven	Emerald/Court Mage (F)		
2024	Card-en-Ciel	Dahlia, Canaria Drasil, Sakuya Zerosaki, Mayoi, Luna		
2024	Ys X: Nordics	Rosalind Rusveri		
2024	Teenage Mutant Ninja Turtles: Mutants Unleashed	April O'Neil		
2024	Farmagia	Salamandira		
2025	The Legend of Heroes: Trails Through Daybreak II	Citizens, HoloCore		
2025	Monster Hunter Wilds	Aida		
2025	Bleach: Rebirth of Souls	Hiyori Sarugaki		
2025	Demon Slayer: Kimetsu no Yaiba – The Hinokami Chronicles 2	Hinatsuru		
2025	Towa and the Guardians of the Sacred Tree	Mutsumi, Eimei, Tanya (young child), Kaji (young child)		
2025	Trails in the Sky 1st Chapter	Captain Amalthea		
2026	Yakuza Kiwami 3 & Dark Ties	Additional voices		
2026	Monster Hunter Stories 3: Twisted Reflection	Kora		
2026	Halloween: The Game	Tanya Harrison		

=== Animation ===
List of voice performances in animation
Year	Title	Role	Notes	Source
2019–present	RWBY	Harriet Bree, Councilwoman Camila		
2020–present	Rainbow High	Poppy Rowan/Skyler Bradshaw	Main role	
2022	The Owl House	Additional voices	Episode: "Thanks to Them"	
2023	Mech Cadets	Maya Sanchez		
2023–24	Princess Power	Karina	Recurring role	
2023	My Daemon	Nun		
2024–present	Dora	Map, The Fiesta Trio's Armadillo		
2025	Pretty Pretty Please I Don't Want to be a Magical Girl	Aika	Main role	
2025	Your Friendly Neighborhood Spider-Man	Carmilla Black, Maria Vasquez/Tarantula	Recurring role	
2026	The Loud House	Jackie	Episode: "Shred of Evidence"	

=== Other ===
List of voice performances in other media
Year	Title	Role	Notes	Source
2026	Sonic the Hedgehog Presents: The Chaotix Casefiles	Whisper the Wolf	Audio drama podcast	

== Awards ==
Year	Award	Category	Work/Recipient	Result	Ref
2021	Crunchyroll Anime Awards	Best VA Performance (EN)	Echidna (Re:Zero − Starting Life in Another World)	Nominated	
2022	Crunchyroll Anime Awards	Best VA Performance (EN)	Rika Kawai (Wonder Egg Priority)	Nominated	
