= Kim Jackson =

Kim Jackson may refer to:

- Kim Jackson (singer)
- Kim Jackson (politician)

== See also ==
- Kimberly Jackson, a character in the Street Fighter series
- Kym Jackson, Australian actress and author
