= Breast physics =

Bouncing breasts in video games

The exaggerated breast physics of Street Fighter V (seen on Chun-Li on the right), which were later changed in a patch

In video games, breast physics (also known as jiggle physics) are a feature that makes a female character's breasts bounce when she moves, sometimes in an exaggerated or unnatural manner.

== History ==
Mai Shiranui is a popular fighting game character who is a notable early demonstration of breast physics technology. An example of Mai's famous breast-bounce effect as seen in 2010's The King of Fighters XIII, in which her design and stance are based on her first appearance in the Fatal Fury series.

The first video game in which breast physics were a notable feature was the fighting game Fatal Fury 2 (1992), which featured the fighter Mai Shiranui, who had noticeably jiggly breasts. The fighting game Soul Edge (1996) was the first 3D video game to feature breast physics as the character Taki has similar physics. The Dead or Alive series (1996 debut) has become identified with the "outlandish" physics of both its fighting moves and its female characters' breasts; its developer Team Ninja created the term "breast physics".

Pronounced breast physics have since remained a staple feature of many fighting games, perhaps in part because these games contain fewer character models than other games and can therefore afford to animate their characters in more detail.

On occasion, this aspect of fighting games has caused particular attention, such as when the 2016 game Street Fighter V had the fighter Chun-Li's breasts move like large water balloons when she was chosen as the second player's character in the selection screen. Although this behavior was noticed by media even before the game's release, it remained present in the released version of the game. The game's publisher Capcom attributed it to a bug and later removed it by a patch.

In reaction to the prevalence of big, bouncy breasts in video games, games writer Jenn Frank initiated a "boob jam" in 2013. The purpose of the initiative was to create games that deal "with an aspect of female breasts other than the fact that they're sexy and fun to look at".

== Technology ==
Breast physics are an application of soft-body dynamics, the field of computer graphics that focuses on physical simulations of the motion and properties of deformable objects. In a game with 3D graphics, character models are composed of a skeleton of "bones" connected with joints and covered by a "skin" of textured polygons. These virtual bones do not necessarily correspond to the bones in real humans, but are required to make anything move. To make breasts or other body parts move, video game animators make the bones' joints move according to the physical rules of the game's engine.

To affect breast movement in most 3D games, the breast's bones are equipped with "springs" that make the breasts bounce when the rest of the skeleton moves. The setup and strength of these springs determines the strength of the breast bounce. Alternatively, the motion of the breasts may be governed by custom-written software, but this is more time-consuming and therefore rarer than using springs, which are a built-in feature in many game engines.

== Unnatural breast physics ==
Some video games feature breast movements that appear unnatural or exaggerated. This may result from limitations of the "springs" system, which is better suited to animating rigid bodies rather than soft objects like breasts. In some games, however, exaggerated breast physics are intentional. This may be caused by increasing the bounce effect in order to make it noticeable even when a character is standing still and talking, which may result in wildly exaggerated bounces when she actually moves.

Ultimately, however, according to game developer Tim Dawson, if a video game features unnatural breast movements, "it's because somebody wanted them to look that way".

== Breast physics in individual games ==
=== Games noted for exaggerated breast physics ===
Games noted by video game publications for their exaggerated breast physics include the following:

- Fatal Fury 2, fighting game (1992)
- The King of Fighters, fighting game series (1994 debut)
- Soulcalibur, fighting game series (1996 debut)
- Dead or Alive, fighting game series (1996 debut). The bouncing was reduced in Dead or Alive 6, which uses a "natural" body physics engine.
- Ready 2 Rumble Boxing, sports game (1999)
- Conker's Bad Fur Day, platformer (2001), in which breasts are used as springboards
- Lula 3D, adult adventure game (2005), which used motion capture and advertised "Bouncin' Boobs Technology" on its boxart.
- Resident Evil, survival horror game (2002/2015)
- Ninja Gaiden Sigma 2, action game (2009), where the breasts' wobble can be separately controlled by the player
- Mortal Kombat, fighting game (2011)
- Skullgirls, fighting game (2012)
- Lightning Returns: Final Fantasy XIII, role-playing game (2013)
- Metal Gear Solid V: The Phantom Pain, action game (2015)
- Marvel Rivals, hero shooter game (2024), particularly for Emma Frost. Various unofficial mods have been released that add exaggerated breast physics to other characters, like Black Widow, Psylocke, Dagger, Luna Snow, Magik, Storm, and Squirrel Girl.

=== Games otherwise noted for their breast physics ===
- Policenauts (PlayStation version in 1996): Hideo Kojima "will never forget arguing over the 'breast jiggle issue' with Shuhei Yoshida".
- Fortnite Battle Royale (2017) used breast physics in a character model (Calamity) released in September 2018, which attracted controversy. The developer Epic Games later removed it as an "embarrassing and unintended" mistake.
- Conan Exiles (2017) allows players to customize a female character's breast size or a male character's penis size. The size affects how much either piece of anatomy jiggles.

== See also ==
- Gender representation in video games
- Sexism and video games
