= Sogi =

Iio Sōgi (1421–1502) was a Japanese poet.

Sogi may also refer to:

== People with the surname ==
- Akoya Sogi (born 1968), Japanese voice actress
- Takamasa Sogi, a fictional character in Corpse Princess

== Places ==
- Sogi, American Samoa, a settlement on Tutuila Island
- Sogi, Samoa, a village in Samoa

== Other uses ==
- SOGI, acronym for sexual orientation and gender identity
- sogi, a term used in Taekwondo stances
- Gold Star Sogi, an association football club in the Samoa National League
