= Kimberly Jackson =

Black female Street Fighter character

- Street Fighter character
- Kimberly in Street Fighter 6
- First appearance: Street Fighter 6 (2023)
- Voiced by: EN: Anairis Quiñones; JA: Nao Tōyama

In-universe information
- Fighting style: Bushinryuu Ninjutsu
- Origin: United States
- Nationality: American

Kimberly Jackson (Japanese: キンバリー・ジャクソン, Hepburn: Kinbarī Jakuson) is a character in the Street Fighter series, first introduced in Street Fighter 6. She is designed with input from Black employees and consultants in order to make her an authentic representation of Black people and culture. She, along with Luke and Jamie, was designed to complement the "old guard" of Ryu, Ken, and Chun-Li.

== Concept and creation ==
Standing 161 centimetres (5 ft 3 1/2 in) tall, Kimberly Jackson was designed for Street Fighter 6 as the first female African American to be playable in the franchise. When designing her, the team wanted to ensure that there was good cohesion between a character's fighting style and origin. Capcom wanted another ninja character in Street Fighter, but found difficulty matching it with her American origins. To get around this, they had her become a protege of Guy, a Japanese ninja from the Final Fight series who resided in the United States. While designing her outfit, they wanted something that emphasized speed and movement due to her being athletic. They also designed her hair and outfit in such a way to ensure that she silhouettes well. Her character theme was composed by Yoshiya Terayama. She wears a scarf around her neck which uses traditional African patterns which she wears when she is doing graffiti or Bushinryu, the fighting style she learned from Guy.

Kimberly, alongside Luke and Jamie, was designed with the intention of complementing the "old guard" of Ryu, Ken, and Chun-Li, with her gameplay emphasizing speed. Each of the three were designed with the idea of them having their own skeletal structure and physique, with the game's director Kaname Fujioka describing her muscles as being thinner towards the ends of her limbs and her body shape and movements as balanced. They also designed this trio with diversity in mind, making her African American as part of that. Street Fighter 6 director Takayuki Nakayama noted that a lot of the staff were fans of Black culture, adding that they made a point of consulting with Black employees to ensure that she was authentic. They hired consultants to help with her design and mannerisms.

== Appearances ==
Kimberly Jackson is an African American woman introduced in the 2023 fighting game Street Fighter 6. A prodigy who was able to graduate from college early, Kimberly sought out Guy to train under him and become a ninja. In the game's storyline she is looking for her uncle Albert, who worked for wealthy martial artist Ken Masters but vanished under mysterious circumstances after the latter was framed for a criminal conspiracy. In English, she is voiced by Anairis Quiñones, while in Japanese she is voiced by Nao Tōyama.

In terms of gameplay, she is described as a "mix-up" character, able to chain high- and low-hitting attacks that require the opponent to guess how to block against them. Kimberly borrows elements from Guy's portrayal in the Street Fighter series, using slides and forward thrusts to quickly close distance. Instead of smoke bombs however, she utilizes spray paint to mask her position during a fight, acting as an explosive and allowing her to immediately reposition herself to a different spot in the arena. In addition she has several other explosives which can be used to distract an opponent. Her harder hitting "super" attacks called "Bushin Beats", "Bushin Ninjastar Cypher", and "Bushin Scramble" each deliver a series of blows in rapid succession on an opponent if they connect, with the last being intended for use against airborne opponents.

Outside of video games, a comic starring Kimberly, titled Street Fighter Masters: Kimberly by Udon Entertainment, was slated for released in December 2023.

== Promotion and reception ==
Kimberly was revealed alongside veteran Street Fighter character Juri for inclusion in Street Fighter 6. Brand manager Jackie Simmons later stated she was worried that Juri would overshadow her, but was relieved that Kimberly excited players just as much. A Good Smile figure in the Pop Up Parade product line of Kimberly was created, included in the deluxe edition of Street Fighter 6 along with one of Luke. In collaboration with Capcom for the 35th anniversary of the series, the company U-Treasure created candles based on Street Fighter 6 characters, Kimberly included.

Upon her initial reveal, media outlets celebrated her inclusion, described by Fanbyte writer Imran Khan as a "positive and undeniably cool portrayal of a subset of black culture," which he felt was a rarity in fighting games. Khan also felt that the decision to involve Black consultants influenced the positive reaction and depiction. She was identified as a standout character in the Street Fighter 6 cast by IGN writer Michael Saltzman. Despite initially planning to play characters like Chun-Li, Cammy, and Sakura, The Mary Sue writer Briana Lawrence stated that Kimberly won her over upon reveal. She praised her hair, as well as her spray can gimmick, expressing an interest in seeing how she develops. Kinda Funny producer and host Blessing Adeoye Jr. praised her "huge braids" as one of his favorite depictions of Black hair in video games.

Discussing Street Fighter 6″s hip-hop inspirations, Game Rant writer Smangaliso Simelane felt that she embodied this "new direction," feeling that her design and special moves makes these themes "come to life." Destructoid writer Chris Moyse felt similarly, calling her design "vivid and dazzling" and stating she represents Street Fighter 6 better than any other character at the time of her reveal. VG247 writer Alex Donaldson called her a "joy" and a great addition to Street Fighter 6. He discussed how she represents what's most exciting about the game, namely a character who learned from one of the series' veteran fighters. Rolling Stone writer Christopher Cruz felt that her character theme touched upon the series' roots with chiptune music and "hip-hop heavy beat drops," evoking the "retro 90s aesthetic that many players associate with the series." GamesRadar+ writer Andi Hamilton felt that she was the most fun character in the roster at the time, appreciating how she was able to get up close in fights and force players to guess her next move. He found her to be among the most interesting in the cast, attributing this to Capcom's recent "streak" of cool new characters.
