= Cy Girls =

Line of action figures

- Other names: Cool Girl
- Type: Action figures
- Invented by: Tomy
- Company: Tomy
- Country: Japan
- Availability: 2001–present
- Materials: Plastic
- Features: Female crimefighters

CY GIRLS (also known as CY Girls or Cy Girls, and as Cool Girl in Japan) is an action figure series by Takara Tomy and Blue Box Toys under the brand bbi collectible (an official bootleg), featuring an elite unit of female crimefighters, combining the elements of both a doll and an action figure.

A Cy Girls video game adaptation (known as Cool Girl in Japan) was developed and published by Konami for the PlayStation 2 in 2004.

== Action figures ==
The original variation of these action figures (ver. 1.5) features 16 points of articulation (joints) that allows the arms and legs to move out to the sides into a spread position, with movable shoulders, elbows, thighs, knees, ankles, wrists and a neck, featuring interchangeable hands, a detailed nude torso, and pivoting ankles. These figures are featured in Action Girls: 12" Female Action Figure Guide Book (ISBN 4-89425-368-2).

In Cy Girls' fictional futuristic universe, the Cardinal-Garrison paramilitary group is an elite all-woman team that comprises experts in various fields chosen from around the world. It is a secret global fighting organization established to combat criminal conspiracy and activity, rumoured to have come into existence during World War II. Their vehicles and other equipment witnessed at the scene of the incidents in which they went into action bore the Cardinal-Garrison 'CG' logo, and since the existence of Cardinal-Garrison was unknown, the group became known as the "Cy Girls".

The CG characters series includes the following characters:

- CG-01 Sky a.k.a. Ice (also in the versions CG-EX1 Special Branch a.k.a. Ice Black Unit, CG-1 PS2 Ice, PS2 SE Box Ice and Cardinal Garrison Ver.)
- CG-02 Jet a.k.a. Raven (also in the version CG-EX2 Law Enforcement (a.k.a. Raven Police coat))
- CG-03 Kat a.k.a. Ash (also in the versions CG-EX3 Martial Arts (a.k.a. Ash Wild Wamp) and Alternative Ash)
- CG-04 Blaze a.k.a. Flame
- CG-05 A.J.McLeod a.k.a. Lightning
- CG-06 Shadow a.k.a. Aska (sometimes referred to as "Asuka") (also in the versions CG-06 PS2 Aska and Aska Non Adopted Design Ver.)
- CG-07 Nikki a.k.a. Harley (also in the version Alternative Harley)
- CG-08 Ebony a.k.a. Coffy
- CG-09 Aurora a.k.a. Artemis
- CG-10 Destiny a.k.a. P.A.S.
- CG-11 Revenger a.k.a. Ray
- CG-12 Electra a.k.a. Ruby (also in the version Alternative Ruby)
- CG-0 Silver
- X-Borg X01 Colossus
- X-Borg X02 Spectre
- X-Borg X03 Fireblade
- XX-01 Bloody Rose a.k.a. Xixox (also in the version ComicCon Xixox)

In addition to the Cool/Cy Girls line, Takara and BBI released figures available under the Cool Girl brand name with the same trademark logo. This line includes the following licensed ("tribute") characters:

- Akiko Fuji and Annu Yuri from Ultraman
- Anna Ishikawa from SHI
- Asuka Langley, Misato Katsuragi and Ritsuko Akagi from Neon Genesis Evangelion
- Batman and Catwoman from Batman Returns / DC Comics
- Beka Valentine from Andromeda
- Casshern, Casshern Sin Project and Kamiko Aso "Luna" from C A S S H E R N
- Deunan Knute from Appleseed
- Doronjo from Yatterman
- Honey Kisaragi (CG-SP1 Cutei Honey, Ex and Alternative versions) from Cutie Honey
- Joanna Dark (Black Suit and Armor Suit versions) from Perfect Dark
- Jun (CG-SP2 G3 Jun Gatchaman Princess, Jun G3 Alternative and Dark Jun G3 versions) from Science Ninja Team Gatchaman
- Kai Tetsuro, Kouchi Todome, Midori Washio and Souchiro Toribe from Kerberos Panzer Cop
- Mai Shiranui from The King of Fighters
- Motoko Kusanagi (Ninja Suit Ver. and Op.ver.) from Ghost in the Shell: Stand Alone Complex

The second type of Cy Girls figures is known as the Perfect Body Female. These dolls molds were not based on the ones produced by Takara Tomy and instead they were manufactured and produced independently by Blue Box Toys, featuring 26 points of articulation based on the basic design of the Ultimate Soldier. This double-jointed feature on the knees and elbows enables them to be posed in the lotus position and any other conceivable position the human body is capable of. There are two interchangeable busts of medium and large sizes with nipples molded on them (the large bust was discontinued and replaced with a much smaller one that was almost flat chested), pivoting ankles and interchangeable hands, designed to hold any weapons or accessory. The products are packaged in a transparent box with a silver painted plastic strip covering the extra bust and the doll is dressed in a grey work-out sports bra with matching shorts.

== See also ==
- ZC Girls
