= Mai Shiranui =

Fictional character from Fatal Fury

- Fatal Fury and The King of Fighters character
- Mai Shiranui in The King of Fighters XIII
- First game: Fatal Fury 2 (1992)
- Designed by: Takuya "T.Y." Yamashita
- Voiced by: English: Sarah Sawatsky (Fatal Fury 2 anime); Lisa Ann Beley (Fatal Fury: The Motion Picture); Maddie Matsumoto (Honor of Kings); Rebecca Rose (Fatal Fury: City of the Wolves, Street Fighter 6); Japanese: Akoya Sogi (1992–2006); Ami Koshimizu (2010–onwards); Kotono Mitsuishi (Fatal Fury animes); Megumi Hayashibara (CD dramas); Reiko Chiba (music)
- Motion capture: Duan Yixuan (Destiny)
- Portrayed by: Various: Tomomi Miyauchi (Fatal Fury 2 commercials); Maggie Q; Pan Chun Chun (Mad Blade commercial)

In-universe information
- Fighting style: Shiranui-ryuu Ninjutsu
- Origin: Japan
- Nationality: Japanese

Mai Shiranui (Japanese: 不知火舞, Hepburn: Shiranui Mai; alternatively written しらぬい まい) is a character in the Fatal Fury and The King of Fighters series of fighting games by SNK. Introduced in 1992's Fatal Fury 2, the character was originally conceived as a male character named "Ninja Master", but when a request was put in to include a female character in the game they revised the concept entirely. For the game's sequel Fatal Fury 3 they considered replacing her with another female character, but due to heavy fan request she returned instead and has appeared in nearly every entry in both the Fatal Fury and King of Fighters series since.

Mai is a Japanese kunoichi and the inheritor of her family's ninjitsu fighting style. Deeply in love with the character Andy Bogard, she enters martial arts tournaments against him so he may see her as a warrior. In addition to the aforementioned series she has appeared in a multitude of other games including the SNK vs Capcom series and various collaboration events between SNK and other gaming companies. She has been voiced by various voice actresses including Akoya Sogi, Ami Koshimizu, Sarah Sawatsky, Lisa Ann Beley, Rebecca Rose, Kotono Mitsuishi, and Megumi Hayashibara. In live action media, she has been portrayed by Tomomi Miyauchi, Maggie Q, and Chinese actress Pan Chun Chun.

Mai has been well received, seen as a mascot for SNK as a whole, which has heavily promoted her in various video game crossovers and merchandise. Her portrayal which often emphasizes the swaying of her large breasts has been cited as one of the first examples of the concept of breast physics in gaming, and a significant element of her character's appeal. Other outlets have attributed some of her popularity to Fatal Fury: The Motion Picture's portrayal of her, while others have praised her personality and ownership of her sexuality. She has additionally been seen as a rival character to Street Fighter's Chun-Li, and symbolic of the rivalry between SNK and Street Fighter developer Capcom. She has also been cited as a frequent subject of cosplay, which her outfit in particular seeing frequent usage in China and Taiwan in promotions and media across both countries.

== Conception and creation ==
Comparison of her standing idle animation in Fatal Fury 2 (left) and The King of Fighters '94 (right). Mai has been cited as one of the first examples of breast physics in video games, and it has been regarded as a significant part of her character's positive reception as a whole.

Introduced in the 1992 SNK developed fighting game Fatal Fury 2, the character was originally conceived as a male ninja simply named Ninja Master. However, after the character's concept was about sixty percent realized, a request was put in to include a female character, and they scrapped their original idea, retaining the ninja identity while developing several character concepts. In terms of personality, they wanted her to be strong-willed woman who made most of her own equipment, and to have a taste in heavy metal music, particularly the band Pantera. At the same time, they wanted her seen as a confident fighter that knew when to back off, and while she gave a hard first impression she was meant to be ladylike and kind-hearted.

Standing 165 centimetres (5 ft 5 in) tall, Mai is a Japanese woman with measurements of 87-55-91 cm (34-22-36 in). Designed by Takuya "T.Y." Yamashita, he stated the hardest problem was figuring out how to "express a girl's body shape", and put extra emphasis on the impact of her bust and hips so her appearance would emphasize her proportions and sexiness. Her long brown hair is worn in a ponytail style, with bangs that frame her face and an ornate hairpin holding it in place. Her outfit consists of a red uwagi with extended loincloth, while a decorative sash tied to form a butterfly musubi dangles from behind her. While matching fingerless gloves and red tabi cover her hands and feet, the lower portion of the uwagi ends similarly to a leotard with the back pulled tightly between her buttocks. The outfit exposes a significant part of her body, particularly her hips, cleavage and the sides of her breasts. While the development team originally gave her a sterner appearance in Fatal Fury 2, they softened it in her subsequent appearances.

She was originally intended to be excluded from the game's sequel, Fatal Fury 3 and replaced with another female character, Alice Chrystler. However, due to heavy fan request, Mai returned instead. Several redesigns were considered for her appearance in the game, including a full armored appearance in heavy ninja gear, before changing her attire to incorporate a bustier. When asked if this was done to reduce the amount of exposure from her outfit, the development team responded there was "no reason in particular". Subsequent games however reverted to her previous design, which has remained mostly consistent since with minimal changes.

=== The King of Fighters and onward ===
As her design was refined for The King of Fighters, they aimed to emphasize her sex appeal, modelling her breasts after model Fumie Hosokawa, while her hips were based on those of media personality Ai Iijima. During work on The King of Fighters '94, the person working on Mai's sprites, C. A. C Yamaski, asked the development head if he could increase the number of sprites for her standing idle animation. The latter agreed due to having extra space on the game's ROM, but was surprised upon seeing the results: while in earlier games her breasts were given a slight amount of jiggle in her animations, the sprite artist had emphasized the movement of her breasts dramatically. While the animation was censored in Western releases of the game, this aspect endured into subsequent titles and the team felt this was a significant factor in her enduring popularity.

For her portrayal in The King of Fighters XIII, character artist Ritsu Yamaguchi wanted to recreate the atmosphere of her Fatal Fury series appearances. He noted that while The King of Fighters often placed emphasis on her breasts, hips and buttocks to depict her as a character that exudes sex appeal, he saw her character in Fatal Fury as portrayed "stoic" motions and as a serious fighter even though her clothing was still revealing. He felt her outfit alone would illustrate her sex appeal, so he focused on the stoic aspect to give her a "more sensual atmosphere", downplaying many of her more sexual animations by comparison.

Later games meanwhile added secondary outfit options. For her appearance in the King of Fighters: Maximum Impact series, her "Another" outfit shortens her hair into a bob cut with the ends flared out, with both her hair and outfit changed to black. Her gloves and boots are larger in this version, with a fur lining around them and parts of her uwagi, while a red scarf extends from her neck and juts out from behind her. In his blog during the game's development, game script writer Akihiko Ureshino joked that this version of her design "feels like her fabric area has decreased despite her increasing beauty", though he was worried some variations may be removed from the final game for being too overt. Meanwhile, in SNK Heroines: Tag Team Frenzy, she is most prominently given a cow print bikini for an outfit which features a matching fake tail, while her hair clip is changed to a set of horns with fake cow ears extending from it.

For her appearance in Fatal Fury: City of the Wolves, her outfit was changed to black leather pants, a matching unzipped jacket with loose sleeves that exposed her midriff and cleavage, and black leather gloves on her hands. The look was inspired by her love of heavy metal and to give her a more casual outfit, as Ureshino felt her previous outfit would be out of place as street attire and would more likely get her arrested. This outfit was also included for her guest character appearance in Street Fighter 6 as an alternative to her regular attire.

== Appearances ==
=== Fighting games ===
Mai Shiranui is a Japanese kunoichi first introduced in the 1992 video game Fatal Fury 2 by SNK. The inheritor of her family's ninjitsu style, she met Andy Bogard at a young age and fell in love with the boy, though Andy himself is dedicated to his own martial arts training. During the three man team King of Fighters series of tournaments, she initially attempts to partner with him, though he rebukes her offer, and she instead joins with other female fighters such as Yuri Sakazaki and King so Andy will recognize her as a fighter. Since her introduction she has appeared in almost every Fatal Fury title since with the exception of Garou: Mark of the Wolves. She has also been in almost every King of Fighters series game with the exception of King of Fighter XI, only appearing in the PlayStation 2 version, and XII, where she was excluded entirely. She additionally appears in spinoff game King of Fighters Maximum Impact 2 and its related title, King of Fighters Maximum Impact Regulation A.

In other SNK-related fighting games, Mai has appeared playable in every game in the SNK vs. Capcom series, She is also a playable character in SNK Gals' Fighters, NeoGeo Battle Coliseum, and SNK Heroines: Tag Team Frenzy. She has also appeared in mobile fighting game titles such as The King of Fighters, Fatal Fury Mobile, The King of Fighters-i, and The King of Fighters D: DyDO Smile STAND. Outside of SNK-related works, Mai appears as downloadable content for Koei Tecmo's Dead or Alive 5 Last Round, its sequel Dead or Alive 6, and in Capcom's Street Fighter 6.

In video games, the character was originally voiced by Akoya Sogi, with Ami Koshimizu taking over the role with the release of King of Fighters: Sky Stage in 2010. Koshimizu stated she initially had an image of Mai as a "mature older sister", but when they directed her to portray the character as a "cheerful older sister in the neighborhood" instead, she tried to balance the portrayal with a hint of sexiness. To this end, she spoke in a lower tone than normal, and used a lot of expression to create a sense of familiarity to give the impression someone could easily be friends with her. In 2025, Rebecca Rose serves as Mai's English voice actress for her appearances in Fatal Fury: City of the Wolves and Street Fighter 6.

In terms of gameplay, Mai is a very mobile and fast character, but also frequently physically weaker in the games. As a result, playing her effectively requires players to connect with more consistent attacks. However this has also led her to be considered one of the easier characters for beginners in titles, and to master using against other players in older titles. She furthermore has a variety of hand-to-hand combat maneuvers, such as her "Flying Squirrel Dance" diving attack and a rushing cartwheel kick followed by an elbow strike called "Deadly Ninja Bees". She can additionally produced flames with some of her attacks, and throw her large folding fans as projectiles.

=== In other games ===
Mai is featured as a playable character in the console shooter games KOF Sky Stage and Neo Geo Heroes: Ultimate Shooting, the quiz game Quiz King of Fighters, and the SNK vs. Capcom spin-off crossover card battle series SNK vs. Capcom: Card Fighters. In a 2017 MMORPG The King of Fighters: World by Ledo Interactive, Mai is featured in person as a non-player and tutorial character, but the players will be able to use her Shiranui style for their own characters. Mai also appears in the 1998 visual novel game The King of Fighters: Kyo, and later in several titles of SNK's Days of Memories dating sim series.

She's featured, usually as a playable character, in various non-fighting King of Fighters-related mobile games either developed or licensed by SNK, including KOF Gals Mahjong, KOF: Battle de Paradise, Mini King of Fighters, The Rhythm of Fighters, and The King of Fighters M, The King of Fighters '97 OL, The King of Fighters: Destiny, The King of Fighters '98: Ultimate Match Online action RPG The King of Fighters All Star, and augmented reality game The King of Fighters Orochi Go. Not-strictly Fatal Fury or King of Fighters mobile games that also feature Mai include SNK Dream Battle, SNK Beach Volley Gal's Attack, SNK Gal's Open: Cutey Shot, SNK Gals Island Dokidoki Puzzle Shock! and its sequel, Neo Geo Tennis Coliseum, You Are the Hero!, Dai Shingeki RPG! Sister Quest, Samurai Shodown Slash, Metal Slug Defense, Beast Busters featuring KOF, and King of Fighters AFK.

Mai has also been featured as a character in collaboration events with other games, including 300 Heroes, Ultimate Heroes, Dazzle Dance, Dungeon Fighter Online, Fantasy Fighter, Honor of Kings, Brave Frontier, Game of Dice, Samurai Kingdom, Clash of Kings, Crash Fever, Crusaders Quest, GangRoad JOKER, Grand Summoners, Everybody's Marble, Rival Arena VS, Saishu Senkan: With Lovely Girls, Tower of Saviors, Valkyrie Connect, Venus Eleven Vivid!, World Cross Saga, Yamato Chronicle, The Fellowship of The Dragon, Puzzle & Dragons, Dungeon Hunter Champions, Tokyo Prison, Ninja Must Die, Doomsday: Last Survivors, and Prison Only. She additionally appears in Bandai Namco's crossover tactical RPG Queen's Gate: Spiral Chaos, as well as a gamebook for the Queen's Blade ecchi series. Mai's image has also been licensed for pachislot machines; In 2003, SNK sued machine manufacturer Aruze for copyright infringement after her likeness was used without permission for their pachinko game Iregui.

=== In other media ===
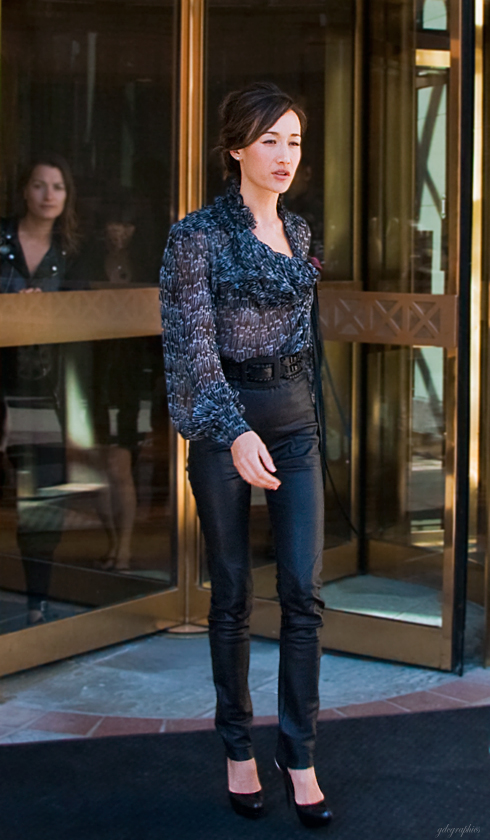
The King of Fighters actress Maggie Q in 2009

Mai has appeared in various other media related to the Fatal Fury and King of Fighters series. In film, she was one of the protagonists of the 2009 American live-action movie The King of Fighters. The movie is loosely based on the games, and portrays her as a CIA agent and girlfriend to fellow series character Iori Yagami. She works alongside the other heroes to try and stop the villain Rugal, who seeks to use an alternate reality to gain the power of the god Orochi. She was played by Maggie Q, who performed her own stunts, while in Japan she was dubbed by Ami Koshimizu.

In anime, Mai first appears in Fatal Fury 2: The New Battle where she is voiced by Sarah Sawatsky in English, and Kotono Mitsuishi in Japanese. Appearing in a small role, she is kidnapped by the villain Laurence Blood, with Andy rescuing her. In the follow up anime Fatal Fury: The Motion Picture, Mai helps the others on their quest to stop the antagonist Laocorn Gaudeamus and his henchmen, and is voiced by Lisa Ann Beley in English while Mitsuishi reprises her role in Japanese. She additionally appears in The King of Fighters: Another Day, a tie in to Maximum Impact where she is voiced by Akoya Sogi.

In other video media, she was portrayed by Tomomi Miyauchi in live-action commercials for Fatal Fury 2 produced by Takara. Mai also appears in the YouTube animated series The King of Fighters: Destiny as part of the "Queens Team" alongside King and Yuri. Produced in China, she is voiced by Ami Koshimizu in Japanese, and Selene Zhan in Chinese, who was also the dubbing director for the work. Motion capture for Mai's body and face meanwhile was provided by Duan Yixuan of the idol group BEJ48. For her crossover appearance in Korean mobile game Mad Blade, the developers produced a live-action short film featuring Mai. Played by actress Pan Chun Chun, the short plays on a joke about her originating from 2D fighting games, showing her initially unable to move from side to side against an opponent.

In audio media, Mai appears in Dengeki G's Magazine drama CD series for Fatal Fury, where she is voiced by Megumi Hayashibara. In 1994, Japanese idol Reiko Chiba performed a vocal track called "Dear Mai Boi" in character as Mai for her music single Non Stop! One Way Love, later cosplaying as the character to promote it. Akoya Sogi meanwhile performed as Mai as part of the King of Fighter '97 Radio Drama Clash Edition broadcast in Japan in 1997. Later, she appeared alongside the rest of SNK's voice cast as part of their "NEO・GEO DJ Station Live" audio performances in Shinjuku, Tokyo, singing "Dear Mai Boi" herself in 1998. Recordings of the events were later released on laserdisc and CD as two-disc sets.

== Promotion and merchandise ==
Mai has been used extensively by SNK to promote their games and company as a whole, using her image on a variety of products such as clothing and condoms. She was featured in live-action commercials for Fatal Fury Special and Fatal Fury 2 in 1993. Multiple "booth babe" models dressed as the character have been fixtures at Tokyo Game Show and other venues, noted in particular for their popularity at such events. Various Asian celebrities have also been hired to promote the character, such as Korean idol Kyungri of the band Nine Muses, Chinese actress Li Bingbing, and Japanese adult actress Kirara Asuka. Meanwhile, a 2005 fan-voted "Ultimate Mai Shiranui Cosplay Tournament" promotional event in Taiwan exhibited nearly a hundred women who dressed up as Mai.

She has also been the focus of other SNK promotions, such as artist Falcoon signing limited edition posters of Mai at E3 2005. Mai was featured heavily in promotional materials for The King of Fighters XIII, and an exclusive t-shirt depicting her was given to all registered participants in the King of Fighters championship at EVO 2012. The King of Fighters XIV Premium Edition included a soundtrack with an illustrated case featuring the character, and the game's pre-order bonuses included a Mai PlayStation 4 theme. Mai was also announced to join the roster of the mobile action RPG SNK All-Star if the number of pre-registered users exceeds half million. A variety of merchandise was also produced to promote her appearance in SNK Heroines, including a t-shirt, standees and stickers bundled with special editions of the game. Mai's outfit and appearance have also been made available as promotional cosmetic skins for players in a variety of games, including titles such as GungHo Games, The King of Soldier II, Dragon Throne: Battle of Red Cliffs, Black Desert Online, Wizardry Online, Mabinogi Heroes, HIT, Knives Out-Tokyo Royale, Phantasy Star Online 2, Lost Saga, Mobile Legends: Bang Bang, and Fall Guys.

A variety of figures have also been produced by a wide range of manufacturers such as A-Label, Aizu Project, Alphamax, Daiki, Hobby Japan, Max Factory, Volks, Goldenhead, SNK themselves, and a "mecha" figure by YCY. In 2009, an exclusive Volks figure was sold in an auction for the Make-A-Wish Foundation. Several major figure product lines have also featured the character, such as the Cy Girls series, Pinky:St, and by Good Smile as part of their Nendoroid and Pop Up Parade figure lines. Meanwhile, several diorama figures have also been released including a 1/6th scale figure by Gantaku, a 1/4th scale figure by Kinetiquettes, and another by PJ Studio. A large bust sculpture of Mai was also produced by Queen Studios, featuring glass eyes. In other merchandise, Exar produced a joystick controller modeled after the Neo Geo's for PlayStation consoles, decorated with Mai-related imagery. In both 2019 and 2020, an entirely Mai-themed Neo-Geo shop opened in Tokyo's Akihabara district for a limited time to celebrate the character's in-universe birthday. In November 2024, Japanese fitness company Tanita as part of their collaboration with SNK studied the bodies of several King of Fighters characters to promote their new body composition monitor, among which included Mai.

== Critical reception ==
Media reception and later games have depicted the characters Chun-Li (left) and Mai as rivals. This image by Akiman, created for SNK vs. Capcom: SVC Chaos, has also been the frequent subject of cosplay.

Mai has been well received since her introduction. The staff of UGO.com described her as a mascot not only for The King of Fighters but SNK as a whole, and felt the character's role as an "unapologetic sex symbol" was a driving force for sales of the King of Fighters franchise. The Mary Sue's Princess Weekees meanwhile cited her as one of the most iconic women in fighting games, noting that while SNK's games themselves were often overlooked in the mainstream, people, including herself, knew about Mai thanks to her sex appeal. Joystiq's Richard Mitchell meanwhile emphasized the character's presence in SNK's work over their competitor Capcom's stating "there's one thing Street Fighter will never have, and that's Mai". Her omission from The King of Fighters XII drew particular backlash, with players boycotting the game and coining the phrase "no Mai, no buy". James Stephanie Sterling in an article for Destructoid in particular criticized her absence from the game, comparing it to Capcom "releasing Street Fighter without Ryu".

Other outlets meanwhile compared Mai to Street Fighter character Chun-Li, as both have been cited as the first two prominent female characters of fighting games. Frederick Badlissi of Diehard GameFan jokingly called it the "question of 'anatomic supremacy' between Mai Shiranui’s breasts (the 'North') and Chun-Li’s thighs (the 'South')". Games Tribune Magazine writer Javier Bello felt the comparison was in part due to the visual appeal of both characters introducing "a sexy and pleasing touch to the eye" in contrast to a cast of "squads of fighters with plenty of testosterone and muscles", with Mai's emphasis on exposure pushing her popularity further in his opinion. French magazine Hardcore Gamers devoted a two-page spread to the characters to compare them, with the article emphasizing while Chun-Li was often the more interesting character, Mai was more consistently alluring, though no less influential on other characters in the fighting game industry.

In regards to her appearance in Fatal Fury: The Motion Picture, Jean-Karlo Lemus and Heidi Kemps of Anime News Network noted the emphasis on fanservice, particularly with how she was introduced "boobs first" in the production. She compared it to her portrayal in the Fatal Fury 2 video game, and observed while her appearance in the game was attractive, she was not "as over-the-top as she eventually became" in her later King of Fighters '94 appearance. Kemps felt the anime's portrayal of Mai affected public perception and led to her later more sexualized appearance and Lemus agreed, feeling elements anime character designer Masami Ōbari had inserted into the film focusing on sexuality supported this theory. The observation was shared by the staff of Game On! USA, who praised Obari's anatomical detail in the film and stated he "made Mai Shinarui the crazy underdressed heroine she is today". Seiichiro Hayakawa of Magmix praised how Obari showed her as a "sensual" character, moreso than he expected, while also displaying her with considerable strength. He further stated that alongside the fanservice, her portrayal left a considerable impression on him of her as a "representative fighting game character".

Gavin Jasper stated while focus was often placed on her breasts, he felt her "optimistic spirit helps balance her into a fun character who is always a blast to play as". He further praised how she owned her sexuality, integrating her sex appeal as an intentional part of her character's battle strategy. Jasper also added that while she is often portrayed as chasing after Andy, he liked that she was not content with simply being a side character and someone that deserved to be his partner over other characters, her role in The King of Fighters' Women's Team "ultimately her way of showing him up and teaching him a lesson". Meanwhile, the staff of Chinese website 163.com noted that while the King of Fighters series later introduced sexier characters, they were often ignored in part thanks to Mai's "exaggerated style" and personality, the latter of which they felt was vital for a character's enduring appeal.

However, some have complained about her design, feeling it represents a trend of oversexualization of female characters in fighting games. A thesis for the Federal University of Bahia cited Mai as an example of how female fighting game characters hypersexualize the breasts and hips, drawing comparisons to portrayal of the mythological Venus. It additionally cited her as an example of how such games tend to portray Asian women as inherently sexual through their use of traditional clothing and how much of her body it exposes.

=== Cultural impact ===
The animation of Mai's breasts in Fatal Fury 2 has been cited as one of the earliest examples of breast physics in video games, a conception that later games have steadily tried to refine, though Mai has remained the most prominent example in 2D animation of the concept. Brett Elston of GamesRadar+ emphasized that while female fighting game characters were prominent in the 1990s, with each new game often trying to out-sexualize the others, gaming periodicals were "abuzz with commentary on what Mai's bobbing bosom meant for the industry", with Elston comparing it to "witnessing (half-naked) women entering the workplace for the first time". The staff of Inside Games praised it as "80% of Mai Shiranui's charm" and an enduring aspect of her character, citing how it fit as a distractionary element of her role as a ninja that was refined to be more realistic as the series progressed.

Mai's outfit has been observed as particularly popular among models in China and Taiwan, with models wearing the attire appearing at non-gaming events such as book signings or car shows. The outfit has also appeared in film, such as 2018's Smiling Proudly in the Gambling World: The Gamble World of Fun (Chinese: 笑傲赌界) where it is worn by one of the movie's antagonists. Kotaku's Brian Ashcraft attributed its popularity to the outfit's simplicity rather than any correlation to the King of Fighters, with the attire acting as a "uniform of sorts" as an "easy go-to choice" for cosplay. In contrast, Singaporean pop-culture site Lollipop felt the outfit demanded "a special kind of physique", and felt this to why it was popular with models.

In 2019, when discussing Terry Bogard's appearance in Super Smash Bros. Ultimate, producer Masahiro Sakurai explained while Mai was widely popular, she would not be able to appear in the game in any context as the game was made for "good boys and girls of many different ages". The statement rapidly became a meme on social media platforms, with Team Ninja taking the opportunity to advertise her inclusion in Dead or Alive 5 and to welcome players to "the world of adults". The development team later clarified it was out of concern that her presence would increase the game's age rating. The decision still led some to question the exclusion in light of characters originating in adult-oriented games, such as Bayonetta, appearing in the title, with Inside Games joking perhaps Mai was "too big" for the game and suggesting it only added to her appeal.

=== Fandom reactions ===
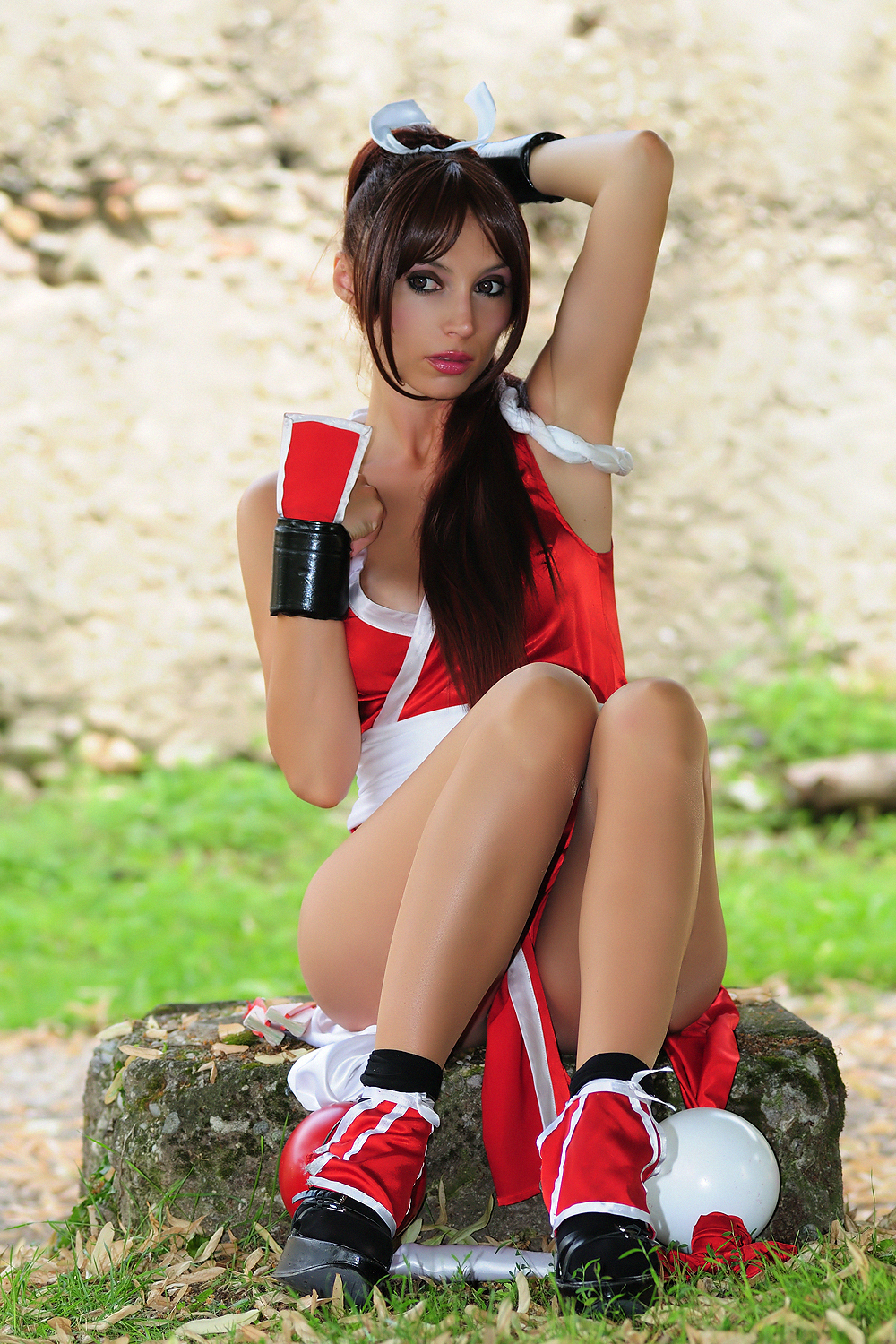
Giorgia Vecchini cosplaying as Mai

Mai has been cited as especially popular among the young people in Hong Kong during the late 1990s, impacting local youth and Mong Kok culture in the country. Mai has also been cited as one of the most popular subjects of cosplay worldwide, appearing on televised material such China's Cybernet television broadcast where the host cosplayed as the character several times, and also on Taiwanese television show Video Game Fighter, where both hosts cosplayed as her. In an interview with Dead or Alive developer Team Ninja, they stated their character Momiji's red clothing and ability to shoot fire was a direct homage to Mai. Mai has also been the frequent subject of explicit third party works, including hentai doujinshi, erotic cosplay, and pornographic films.

Gamest in their Gals Island series of magazines shared the same significant praise for Mai's physical attributes, but also appreciated her strength, shown able to not only hold her own against seemingly superhuman opponents but also defeat them soundly. They also pointed out that while many female fighting game characters were often shown to be seeking a boyfriend, Mai by comparison was shown to be in a relationship. They felt this played a part in her appeal, as players often saw her as "too good" for Andy, and many fans often considered scenarios of sweeping her away from him. In this regard, the staff felt players developed their own mental image of who Mai was unique to them and that image only developed further over time, despite her character being nothing more than pixels on the screen.

Russian magazine Strana Igr observed that often Mai and Andy were stated to be in a relationship in the games, but often that extended only to holding hands or him regarding her in a sisterly manner, which led to interpretations that she was "single for now" amongst fans. The staff emphasized that Mai's popularity amongst them was primarily due to her figure, particularly her large breasts. They added that while the developers provided official measurements, fan art and similar often enlarged her bust "with little regard for believability". They acknowledged though this was not necessarily an occurrence unique to Mai amongst Japanese fan interpretations, particularly with characters that held an anime aesthetic. At the same time Mai had become rather iconic for such reinterpretations, citing the influence of her role as one of the first examples of breast physics in gaming.

== See also ==
- Ninja in popular culture
