= ZC Girls =

Japanese action figure line

ZC Girls is a series of Japanese action figures manufactured by ZC World. The product was inspired by the phenomenal success of the Cy Girls. The products were first released in 2009 to have a wide variety of modern occupations of the Lady's Mission.

== EVE Body design ==
The original and current body design is called EVE. This design features 25 points of articulation, including removable arms as well as two rubber bodices to choose from. The bodices cover a T-shaped socket that hold the arms and head in place. The first bodice extends from the neck to the top of the ribcage to allow the abdominal joint to be more movable. The second bodice is a full-torso piece that covers the abdominal joint for a more realistic look, but with limited mobility. The dolls in this category included the following: Julia, a futuristic soldier dressed in a black torso body suit with body armor; Katy, an assassin in a black vinyl corset with matching gloves; Black Angel, a blonde spy in a black catsuit with a reptile scale pattern; White Archer, a long-haired redhead in a white jacket and shorts with matching high heel boots; Rose, a crimson redhead in a white corset, mini jacket, stockings and high heel boots; Cat, a black-haired white lady in a leather catsuit with a matching mask; Kelly, a short haired redhead in a white lace-up tank top, with leather shorts, gloves, high heel boots, and a matching cap; Janice, a blonde in a black Playboy Bunny suit with a witch's cloak, mask and hat; Lucci, a long haired brunette in a pink nurses uniform; Janny, an office manager in a black women's business suit and slacks; Ice, an auburn redhead in a blue vinyl corset, with matching high heel boots and black stockings; Wolf, an Auburn assassin in black leather shorts, gloves and high heel boots with a heavy assault rifle; Ada, a black-haired mistress in a black corset and stockings; and Nikita, a redhead Russian spy in a black women's business suit with a suitcase containing a small arsenal of weapons.

== Eye Rotation Technique (ERT) ==
The second variation was known as the Eye Rotation Technique also known as ERT. This variation had the same EVE body but with a new head, with eye sockets inside, so that it could be opened to change the eyeballs to a different iris color. The dolls in this category included the following: Carol, a bank robber, dressed in a brown sleeveless leather jumpsuit, red leather coat and white clown mask; Risa, a redhead ninja in a blue vinyl vest and glittering body suit; Rosanna, a blonde Biker in a black leather jacket and slacks; Kathy, a black-haired nerd in a black dress, stockings, black leather jacket and pink horn-rimmed glasses; Rebecca, a redhead cowgirl in bluejeans, chaps, a red leather coat, western boots and hat; Muriel, an auburn sniper in a beige uniform with a bullet-proof vest and knee pads; and Queenie, a burlesque dancer with red highlighted black hair in a black and red corset with black lace-up boots and a mini crown.
