= Cy Girls (video game) =

2004 video game

- North American cover art
- Developer: Konami Computer Entertainment Japan
- Publisher: Konami
- Platform: PlayStation 2
- Release: JP: February 19, 2004; NA: March 23, 2004; EU: May 7, 2004
- Genres: Action-adventure; Third-person shooter
- Mode: Single-player

Cy Girls, known as COOL GIRL in Japan, is a 2004 action-adventure video game developed and published by Konami for the PlayStation 2. The game is based on the Cy Girls action figure franchise by Takara Tomy. It focuses on agents Ice and Aska as they embark on secret missions.

The game received mixed reviews, with praise for its stylish presentation but criticism for its gameplay and puzzles.

== Plot ==
Cy Girls tells a spy-fi story where in 2058, "Damnation Monday" was the name of a disaster where power failure occurred worldwide. This caused the collapse of various countries and companies. The game's story takes place in 2084, 26 years after "Damnation Monday".

The game has two CG agents as the main characters. CG-1 Ice, the genius hacker and firearms expert on the mission to destroy an information file in the highly secure corporate building of a company known as Net Justice in Buenos Aires (where she is navigated by her partner Sancho), and CG-6 Aska, a master female ninja with astonishing athletic ability attempting to avenge the death of her father in a secret village in Japan (where she is navigated by her brother Kogetsu).

While only Ice and Aska are made available as player characters, other CG members also appear in the game to provide support.

== Gameplay ==
In-game screenshots of Cy Girls. Screenshots shows the two CG agents Ice and Aska. Ice (left) fights enemies with firearms while Aska (right) uses a ninjato.

Cy Girls is an action-adventure game that combines puzzle-solving with two distinctly different combat styles: ninja-oriented melee combat and stealth for Aska, and firearms combat for Ice. Essentially, the game was two different games depending on the character choice, as the game was released as a 2-disc package, containing Aska's data on one disc and Ice's data on the other. After completing the main story on a disc, additional characters from the story were unlocked, as well as an 'Extra Mode', where players could choose any combination of weapons, any unlocked character, or any outfit.

Ice and Aska fight with different weapons and techniques. Ice fights with firearms, using cover mechanics that include taking cover behind walls/objects and shoot at enemies. Ice can use gunfight moves such as somersaults and cartwheels when using auto-targeting. For Aska, she fights with a ninjato and other ninja weaponry. Aska has a guard meter which depletes every time she's able to block a physical attack. In addition, Aska's able to run on walls.

In addition, all unlocked characters had the ability to 'dive' into the world of cyberspace. Known as Cyber Dimension or Cy-D, standard moves were disabled, forcing all characters to resort to using punches and kicks to defeat enemies within the domain while new moves and skills are only founds in cyberspace data points. In addition, players would have a maximum of 10 minutes within Cy-D before reaching game over (explained in-game as being the amount of time the character could remain within Cy-D without suffering a complete mental breakdown.)

== Development ==
On May 9, 2002, Konami announced that Cy Girls would be released for the PlayStation 2. It was announced at the 2002 Tokyo Toy Show (TTS) that the game would see a 2003 release worldwide. According to Horikami, who was the Konami representative during the TTS event, he hoped that the game would pave the way for the company to consider comic and film adaptations of Cy Girls.

Konami said that the game would be shown on May 22, 2002, at the annual E3 convention. During the convention, Konami confirmed plans to release the game in North America.

From July 26 to 27, 2003, Cy Girls demos were shown to the public during the World Hobby Expo in Tokyo. The game was also previewed at the 2003 E3 and TGS convention.

On October 21, 2004, a "The Best" version of COOL GIRL was released in Japan.

The CG movies animated for the game's cutscenes were made by Digital Frontier, a CG company known for creating the CG hair reproduction in the theatre version of "Bono Bono" and Taiyo Matsumoto's "Ping Pong". Sound effects were done by Shizuo Kurahashi.

The game uses two camera modes, consisting of "Novice" and "Expert" mode. "Novice" allows the camera to follow along the character when she moves while "Expert" has the player using the controls to move the camera around. Konami had originally intended to leave "Expert" as the default camera mode before including "Novice". An enemy lock feature is also present, which can be toggled on or off.

Cy Girls is made up of two discs. Disc 1 is for Ice's scenario while Disc 2 is for Aska's scenario. The game uses the same engine used for Metal Gear Solid 2.

=== Marketing ===
To promote the game, a limited edition Cy Girls figure of Ice was released in Japan in a bundled set with the game. A limited edition Cy Girls figure of Aska based on an outfit that was not implemented in the game, with 100 figures released via lottery to anyone in Japan who sent a survey postcard included in the game.

Konami released the COOL GIRL Konami Official Perfect Guide on March 31, 2004.

== Reception ==
Reception

Aggregate score
| Aggregator | Score |
|---|---|
| Metacritic | 53/100 |

Review scores
| Publication | Score |
|---|---|
| Computer Games Magazine | A− |
| Electronic Gaming Monthly | 5.67/10 (Note: In Electronic Gaming Monthly's review of the game, one critic gave it 7/10, and the rest gave it each a score of 5/10.) |
| Eurogamer | 2/10 |
| Famitsu | 26/40 |
| Game Informer | 4/10 |
| GameSpot | 5.1/10 |
| GameZone | 4.8/10 |
| IGN | 5.8/10 |
| Official U.S. PlayStation Magazine | 2.5/5 stars |
| X-Play | 2/5 stars |
| Entertainment Weekly | B |
| Playboy | 50% |

The game received "mixed" reviews according to the review aggregation website Metacritic. In Japan, Famitsu gave it a score of 26 out of 40. Tokyo Drifter of GamePro said, "You would have to be an insanely devoted fan of the action-figure line from which the characters originate and a fan of repetitive level exploration to gain any type of enjoyment from Cy Girls. It all seems like such a waste as there are ideas present that could have made a good game great, but in a bad game like this, they only manage to bump the score by a point." (Note: GamePro gave the game 3.5/5 for graphics, two 3/5 scores for sound and control, and 2/5 for fun factor.)

Ice and Aska were featured in Play's girls of gaming special in 2003. In 2009, GamesRadar+ counted Cy Girls among the games "with untapped franchise potential," commenting that the game "failed in many ways, with half-formed ideas and shoddy level design that had the player incessantly backtracking through levels." It also included the game on its list of the top shower scenes in games in 2012.
