= Luke (Street Fighter) =

Street Fighter character

Luke Sullivan
- Street Fighter character
- Luke Sullivan in Street Fighter 6
- First game: Street Fighter V (2021)
- Created by: Takayuki Nakayama
- Voiced by: EN: Aleks Le; JA: Tomoaki Maeno

In-universe information
- Fighting style: Military Mixed martial arts
- Origin: United States
- Nationality: American

Luke Sullivan (Japanese: ルーク・サリバン, Hepburn: Rūku Sariban) is a character from Capcom's Street Fighter fighting game series, first introduced in the 2016 video game Street Fighter V as the final downloadable content from 2021. The story reveals that Luke is an orphan who joined the military following the death of his father Robert in a terrorist attack. Following multiple years of training, Luke quits as he faces his trauma, becoming an older and more easygoing fighter in the sequel Street Fighter 6 as a teacher. He is voiced by Aleks Le in English and Tomoaki Maeno in Japanese.

Luke was created by Capcom as the final Street Fighter V DLC, being conceptualized as a new type of hero from the franchise, taking after former lead Ryu. Despite the developers' intentions, Luke's character was mostly received with negative response in Street Fighter V for not feeling as appealing as other fighters. His return in Street Fighter 6 also received mixed responses from game journalists and fans as a result of his energetic personality not fitting for an adult.

== Concept and creation ==
Luke was originally created to be the protagonist of Street Fighter 6 by director Takayuki Nakayama and combat director Ryuichi Shigeno. His original design was similar to the finished Street Fighter 6 but with Street Fighter V still ongoing, the team considered adding him to that game while changing the design to be more youthful. Luke was first revealed by Capcom in August 2021 as downloadable content for Street Fighter V instead. While the original design involves a sleeveless blue jacket and blue pants, he also wears a yellow hood that covers his chest and head. A topless design and an alternative white basketball jersey were also created. The final DLC from Street Fighter V for November of the same year, Luke was said by members of Capcom that his character would be influential in future installments of the series. Despite being voiced by Tomoaki Maeno in the original Japanese version of the game, his English voice actor Aleks Le did the recording first. Maeno enjoyed the character's fighting style and expressed join for joining the Street Fighter community with it. While Luke shares his name with Rook, a character from the cancelled Capcom Fighting All-Stars, Capcom confirmed that the two are not the same character. Luke's visual appearance was inspired by the cartoon character Popeye the Sailor, especially with how his arms were designed.

When Luke was revealed as the sole character used for the cover of Street Fighter 6 in December 2022, his English voice actor Aleks Le addressed comically negative fan response to this and lamented that his fans are poorly treating the work Capcom has employed in developing their new game. While recording the game, Le did ad-libbing and changed one of his original lines, which was approved by voice director Jonathan Klein. When it comes to gameplay, Luke remains a mid-range fighter without multiple changes to his core and design as Capcom had already planned his development in Street Fighter 6. When it came to the alternative outfit, Capcom gave Luke his original Street Fighter V outfit, which emphasizes his more youthful and aggressive personality from such installment. The designer enjoyed his facial expressions that emphasized his immature side.

Director Takayuki Nakayama aimed to make Luke a new relatable protagonist that contrasts the iconic Ryu by making him more colorful and changing his design with an emphasis on orange and blue. Luke, Kimberly, and Jamie were designed with the intention of complementing the "old guard" of Ryu, Ken Masters, and Chun-Li. Luke was specifically designed to be "the star". Jamie was also created to become Luke's rival as their designs have a major contrast. Nakayama wanted to differentiate between the new generation of characters, Jamie and Luke, whom they announced this time, and the older generation of legends. They wanted to convey the masterful feeling of the older generation, that they have reached the level of mastery. Luke was redesigned to appeal to newcomers, his original design was kept intact.

== Appearances ==
Introduced in Street Fighter V, Luke's story mode reveals that, as a child, his father Robert was killed while helping him and others escape during a terrorist bombing. Traumatized by his father's death, Luke joins the military, where he is trained for years by colonel Guile. However, after years of working for the special forces, Luke has doubts about whether the military is his life's true calling. Guile encourages Luke to leave the military and become a professional fighter.

Street Fighter 6 features an older Luke as the overreaching mascot protagonist of the game, now showing a passion for fighting. During his arcade mode, Luke gets into a fight with fellow fighter Jamie over a childish argument. In the World Tour mode of the game, Luke is introduced as the first teacher that the player's avatar and Bosch Waraya are mentored by in Metro City. Luke continuously teaches the player how to fight as well as how to travel to other areas. Figurines of Luke were also produced. A prequel comic, Days of the Eclipse, has Luke meeting Ken Masters as he helps in taking care of his son Mel during a criminal plot. Yoshio Mokomokomaru Masao also authored a manga titled Street Fighter: Luke Rising with heavy emphasis on Luke's life between Street Fighter V and Days of the Eclipse. Outside Street Fighter, Luke also appeared in the mobile phone game The King of Fighters All Star with his Street Fighter V design.

== Reception ==
Regarding Luke's debut in Street Fighter V, Eurogamer expressed mixed responses to Luke's original design and importance in the Street Fighter series, believing his design is common and similar to other blond fighters like Ken Masters, Cody, and Guile, among others. PCGamer believed this similarities were intentional as if Luke could turn out to be Guile's son especially when his reveal trailer has the character remembering his father. Destructoid found Luke too overpowered in his original form from the game to the point that he was taken advantage of in tournaments involving the game, where he easily defeated other characters. Once the game was patched by Capcom, leading the writer to believe that from then on, Street Fighter V might be more balanced.

Anime News Network noted that despite Capcom's insistence on several websites that Luke will become a potential figure in Street Fighter 6, he saw Luke as a possible failure in the same manner as Alex from Street Fighter III: New Generation, who was meant to replace Ryu but failed to appeal to gamers. The writer added that gamers might instead prefer to play as returning characters like Ryu, Chun-Li, among others. Nevertheless, the website wondered if Luke was connected to a cancelled Capcom game whose protagonist named Rook shared multiple similarities in terms of appearance. In "Street Fighter 6: Who is Luke?", GameRant had similar feelings about the idea of Luke replacing Ryu like Alex was meant to do in Street Fighter III but believe Ryu's most important quest was filled during the story mode of Street Fighter V, making the decision to put Luke more fitting than Alex's attempt and suggested Luke's personality is not different from Ryu as a result of both characters having the desire of becoming stronger in the video games.

Similar to the negative response Luke had in Street Fighter V, Hobby Consolas said that Luke's inclusion in the Street Fighter 6 cover led to fanarts about him as gamers did not find the new protagonist appealing when compared to Ryu among other returning player characters Time Extension also noted the fans panned the decision to make this cover due to the handling of Luke as if he was "channelling his Popeye energy" among other criticisms. In marketing Street Fighter 6, GamesRadar found Luke's interactions with Ryu ridiculous as the former mocks the latter's voicelines. While GameInformer was welcoming to the new cast, writer Marcus Stewart found Kimberly as a more potential favorite character over Luke, believing the former is more original and innovative than Luke. In a presentation of the game, Capcom brand manager Matthew Edwards saw Luke's performance from Japan Expo 2022 and noted that one of the gamers managed to imitate Luke's dance with GamesRadar linking to Gen Z due to his energetic style despite being in his late 20s. The dance has been called "from the TikTok generation" as well as "cringey" by Screen Rant. Nevertheless, the website believed that every character was more fleshed out in their victory poses, giving Luke also the first chance to show his personality. Destructoid heavily disliked Luke's victory dance to the point of labeling it as one of the worst elements that came with the new Street Fighter game. Mixed responses to Luke's taunts were also present in Japanese regions according to Defaminigamer.

Although Red Bull linked Luke to the type of Shoto type of characters as he performs similar types of attacks as Ryu, Ken and Sagat, he believed his Street Fighter 6 persona was more effective than the returning characters, pointing out the execution of his fireball projectile, becoming one of the most dominant fighters from 2022. GameRant also felt that Luke was derived from the Shoto archetype in gaming, having a projectile move Sand Blast similar to Ryu's Hadoken and thus would appeal to veterans skilled with playing these types of characters. Besides commentary over his gameplay, GameRant commented on his growth, believing Luke was a more appealing fighter, especially now that he is the first master to the player in the World Tour system from Street Fighter 6.
