= Street Fighter 6 =

2023 video game

- Cover art featuring Luke
- Developer: Capcom
- Publisher: Capcom (Note: Street Fighter 6 Type Arcade was published by Taito.)
- Director: Takayuki Nakayama
- Producers: Kazuhiro Tsuchiya; Shuhei Matsumoto; Kansuke Sakurai
- Designer: Mitsugu Ashida
- Programmer: Keiji Sakamoto
- Artist: Kaname Fujioka
- Composers: Yoshiya Terayama; Shigeyuki Kameda; Yasumasa Kitagawa; Tom Fox; Marshall Smith; Haruki Yamada
- Series: Street Fighter
- Engine: RE Engine
- Platforms: PlayStation 4; PlayStation 5; Windows; Xbox Series X/S; Arcade; Nintendo Switch 2
- Release: PS4, PS5, Win, XSXS; WW: June 2, 2023; Type Arcade; Arcade; JP: December 14, 2023; Nintendo Switch 2; WW: June 5, 2025
- Genre: Fighting
- Modes: Single-player, multiplayer
- Arcade system: Taito Type X4 (NESiCAxLive2)

Street Fighter 6 (Note: ストリートファイター6 (Japanese: Sutorīto Faitā Shikkusu; Also written as "Street Fighter VI")) is a 2023 fighting game developed and published by Capcom. It is the seventh main entry in the Street Fighter franchise, following Street Fighter V (2016), and was released worldwide on June 2, 2023, for PlayStation 4, PlayStation 5, Windows and Xbox Series X/S, while an arcade version, named Street Fighter 6 Type Arcade, was published by Taito for Japanese arcade cabinets in December. An updated version with post-launch content, Street Fighter 6 Years 1-2 Fighters Edition, was released on June 5, 2025, alongside a Nintendo Switch 2 version as a launch title and corresponding Amiibo for the game.

Developed on the RE Engine, Street Fighter 6 supports cross-platform play and rollback netcode. It offers three overarching game modes and three control options. The game features a real-time commentary system, providing a tournament-style feel and the option to cheer on the player. The game continues the "2.5D" style introduced in Street Fighter IV.

Street Fighter 6 received critical acclaim and has sold over 7 million units worldwide as of June 2026.

== Gameplay ==
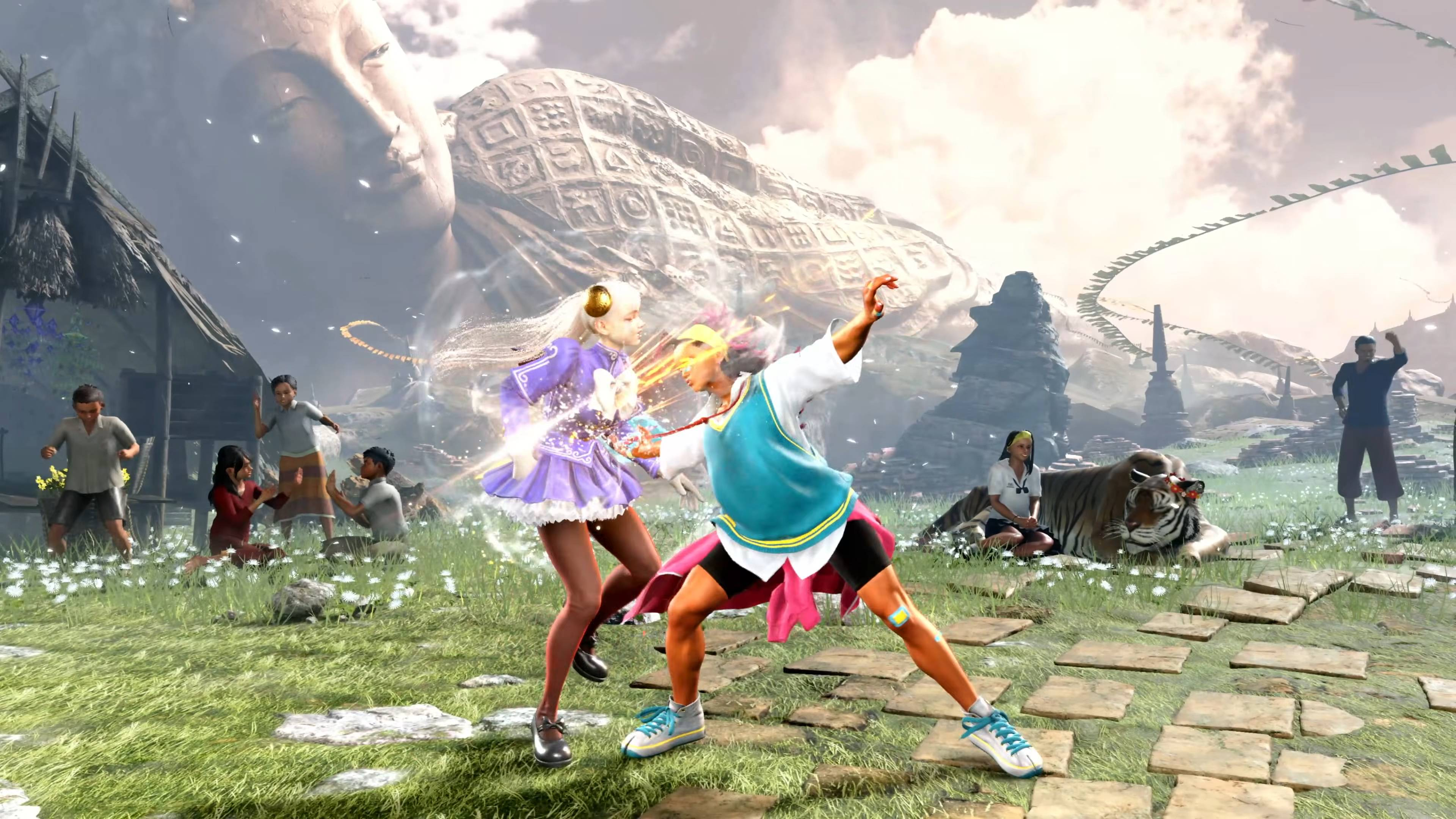
Gameplay screenshot of Ingrid versus Yasmine

Street Fighter 6 features similar 2D fighting gameplay to the previous games in the series, in which two fighters use a variety of attacks and special abilities to knock out their opponent. The main new gameplay addition of Street Fighter 6 is the Drive Gauge, a system designed to encourage player creativity. The gauge can be used for five different techniques, requiring players to choose which to prioritize. Most of the Drive Gauge's mechanics are based on previously existing mechanics from previous Street Fighter games, such as parries, focus attacks, and EX moves. Fully expending a character's Drive gauge makes them enter "Burnout" state, where the gauge slowly refills but cannot be used. While in this Burnout state, the character's blocking degrades, and they become susceptible to "chip damage" (taking a small amount of damage when blocking attacks (Note: Unlike past games, where every blocked attack dealt a small amount of damage, Street Fighter 6 has no block damage unless a character is in the Burnout state.)) and can become stunned when hit by Drive Impact close to a corner.

The game features three control types: the "classic" control scheme, which is a six-button layout that functions similarly to previous games in the series; the "modern" control scheme, which is a simplified four-button layout that assigns special moves to a single button combined with a directional input; and the offline-only "dynamic" control scheme, in which the player need only press a single button for the game's AI to select an appropriate attack for that button press.

The use of multiple super combos returns from the Street Fighter Alpha sub-series, also counting the Ultra Combo W variant from Ultra Street Fighter IV. However, each characters' super combo arts are based on three respective level gauges. For example, Ryu's Shinku Hadoken, Shin Hashogeki and Shin Shoryuken can only be used at Level 1, 2 and 3 respectively. When a player is low on health, their Level 3 super move becomes a Critical Art, which is more powerful in addition to having an expanded cinematic scene. Certain movesets can only be cancelled to super moves based on how many levels the player has filled, such as EX/Overdrive special moves, which can only be cancelled to higher levels above Level 1, while regular special moves without sacrificing the Drive gauge can only be cancelled to Level 3. However, some characters' secondary Level 3 Super Art is exclusive to Critical state, such as Akuma's Shun Goku Satsu. An "extreme" battle type is also available for play, allowing players to compete in matches that feature special rules and gimmicks.

Street Fighter 6 features three overarching game modes: Fighting Ground, World Tour, and Battle Hub. Fighting Ground contains local and online versus battles as well as training and arcade modes. World Tour is a single-player story mode featuring a customizable player avatar exploring 3D environments, such as Final Fight's Metro City and the small, fictional Central Asian nation of Nayshall, with action-adventure gameplay. Players can obtain cosmetic items, gain experience points, and customize their avatar's moves by training with the game's other characters. New content was added to World Tour mode with each new character update through the end of the third season, after which it was announced that the mode would not receive further updates. Battle Hub acts as an online lobby mode, using the customizable player avatars from the World Tour mode. In the Battle Hub, players can compete in ranked or casual matches, battle as their created avatars using the skills learned in World Tour mode, participate in special events, or play emulated Capcom arcade titles, using the same emulation technology used in the Capcom Arcade Stadium series, among other features. The game includes a new feature called "Game Face", in which a character can make different kinds of facial expressions while loading screens. An update in May 2026 added new avatar battle modes, allowing players to earn new avatar cosmetics and moves outside of World Tour mode. Players can earn cosmetic rewards from regular online fighting passes, including stickers, emotes, and avatar items.

A real-time commentary system is a new feature in Street Fighter 6, where English and/or Japanese commentators watch the action in real-time, giving it a more tournament-style feel, or allow the option to cheer the player on. Ten different commentators are featured, four play-by-play commentators and six color commentators; players can choose whether to enable color commentary. Ryutaro "Aru" Noda, Jeremy "Vicious" Lopez, Steve "TastySteve" Scott, and Kosuke Hiraiwa are the four play-by-play commentators, while Demon Kakka, Thea "Zelina Vega" Trinidad, James "jchensor" Chen, Hikaru Takahashi, Amaki Pururu and Tatsuya Haitani are the six color commentators.

== Plot ==
World Tour is set several years after the events of Street Fighter III and follows an original player-created avatar character, framed as a martial artist seeking to become stronger. The player begins training under Luke in Metro City, where they meet and bond with a fellow student, Bosch Waraya. While the player begins training for an upcoming fighting tournament under several different masters, they learn that Bosch is on the run from the Mad Gear gang for stealing money from them. The player catches up with Bosch, only for him to be abducted by Juri after giving a memory drive to the player. Working with Chun-Li's student Li-Fen, the player learns from the drive that Bosch stole the money for a resistance group fighting against Amnesia, a terrorist organization influencing Nayshall's government. While following clues sent to them by a member of the resistance, the player has repeated encounters with an unknown fighter who wears a cardboard box and wields Psycho Power. Upon learning from the resistance of the Suval'hal martial arts tournament in Nayshall, the player qualifies to participate as Metro City's representative.

During the tournament, the player again encounters the box-wearing fighter and knocks the box from his head, revealing him to be Bosch. Bosch explains that Amnesia was formed by former Shadaloo agents and has been using the tournament to launder money for terrorist activities; Bosch willingly allowed himself to be experimented on after his kidnapping, hoping Psycho Power would make him strong enough to assassinate Amnesia's leader, JP. Losing control of his mind and body, Bosch escapes, and resistance leader Kalima decides to eliminate both Bosch and JP using a bomb implanted in the championship belt. The player objects and attempts to disarm the bomb during the night, but is caught by JP, who orders them to leave. The next day, the player makes it to the tournament finals, where they fight against Bosch. Regardless of the outcome, JP, aware of the sabotage, activates the bomb trigger and has Bosch's sister Yua present the belt to the victor instead. To save her, Bosch snatches the belt moments before it explodes, killing him. The player defeats JP in retribution, mourning the loss of Bosch.

Some time later, the player encounters other Neo Shadaloo factions, including those who experimented on Bosch. An amnesiac figure resembling M. Bison finds this group and begins to unite them under his leadership. The player also encounters the extradimensional being Ingrid, who agrees to help them go back in time and avert Bosch's fate. As a result, the player alters the past to prevent Bosch's kidnapping and ensure his survival and victory in the Suval'hal tournament, at the cost of his shared history with the player.

== Characters ==
Artwork featuring base roster of the game

The game was launched with a base roster of 18 characters, six of whom were new to the Street Fighter series. Several additional characters were later released as paid downloadable content via the game's season passes.

Two guest characters from SNK's Fatal Fury series, Terry Bogard and Mai Shiranui, were also added to the game in the second season pass, while the fourth season pass features Tifa Lockhart from Square Enix's Final Fantasy VII Remake series. This makes Street Fighter 6 the first mainline Street Fighter game to feature third-party guest characters.

Characters who are playable for the first time in a Street Fighter title are highlighted in bold. Guest characters are marked in italics.

Base roster

- Blanka
- Cammy
- Chun-Li
- Dee Jay
- Dhalsim
- E. Honda
- Guile
- **Jamie**
- **JP**
- Juri
- Ken
- **Kimberly**
- **Lily**
- Luke
- **Manon**
- **Marisa**
- Ryu
- Zangief

Season 1

- Rashid
- **A.K.I.**
- Ed
- Akuma

Season 2

- M. Bison
- **Terry**
- **Mai**
- Elena

Season 3

- Sagat
- C. Viper
- Alex
- Ingrid

Season 4

- **Yasmine**
- **Arjun**
- **Tifa**
- **Bosch**

Several newcomers were introduced to the series:

- **A.K.I.**, an apprentice of F.A.N.G.'s who specializes in poison and snake kung fu. She was formerly known as Phantom. Prior to making her debut in the first season pass, she was first introduced as a cameo character in the Street Fighter V side reader chapter "Toxicity".
- **Arjun Gummadi**, an Indian ex-police detective on the run after being accused of murdering a colleague, Karna, during their secret investigations on a criminal conspiracy. He uses his extraordinary lung capacity, combined with yogic breathing, to unleash explosive power through his bare-knuckle yoga techniques, in additions to Bollywood elements, due to his past dream of becoming an actor. Introduced in the game's fourth season pass.
- **Bosch Waraya**, a Nayshall native and rookie fighter attempting to protect his home from JP's influence. He was first introduced in the game's World Tour mode as the player character's rival, later becoming playable as part of the game's fourth season pass.
- **Jamie Siu**, a Hong Kong Chinese drunken kung fu break dancer who is a rival of Luke since childhood, and idolizes the Lee brothers, Yun and Yang.
- **JP**, a Bartitsu fighter and the game's main antagonist. He is secretly a leader of a terrorist organization known as Amnesia, and was a former member of M. Bison's Shadaloo criminal organization. JP can utilize Psycho Power similar to Bison, and is the mastermind behind many of the game's events.
- **Kimberly Jackson**, an African American ninja and pupil of Guy investigating the death of her uncle. She is a self-proclaimed "Ninja Star" who fights with Bushin style Ninjutsu and has a love of 1980s music and graffiti.
- **Lily Hawk**, the youngest member of T. Hawk's Thunderfoot tribe who wields a pair of ball-headed war clubs known as "pogamoggans".
- **Manon Legrand**, an idealistic French ballerina, judoka champion, and celebrity who enters fighting tournaments to pursue true beauty through self-improvement.
- **Marisa Rosetti**, a giant muscular Italian jewelry designer and an MMA-pankratiast of Greek descent, whose medium-length red hair resembles a gladiator helmet. A bisexual woman, she seeks to marry a partner of equal strength.
- **Yasmine Delos Santos Bautista**, a Filipina high school student searching for her long-lost brother. She specializes in eskrima and silat, and wields a crescent-shaped karambit knife. Introduced in the game's fourth season pass.

== Development and release ==
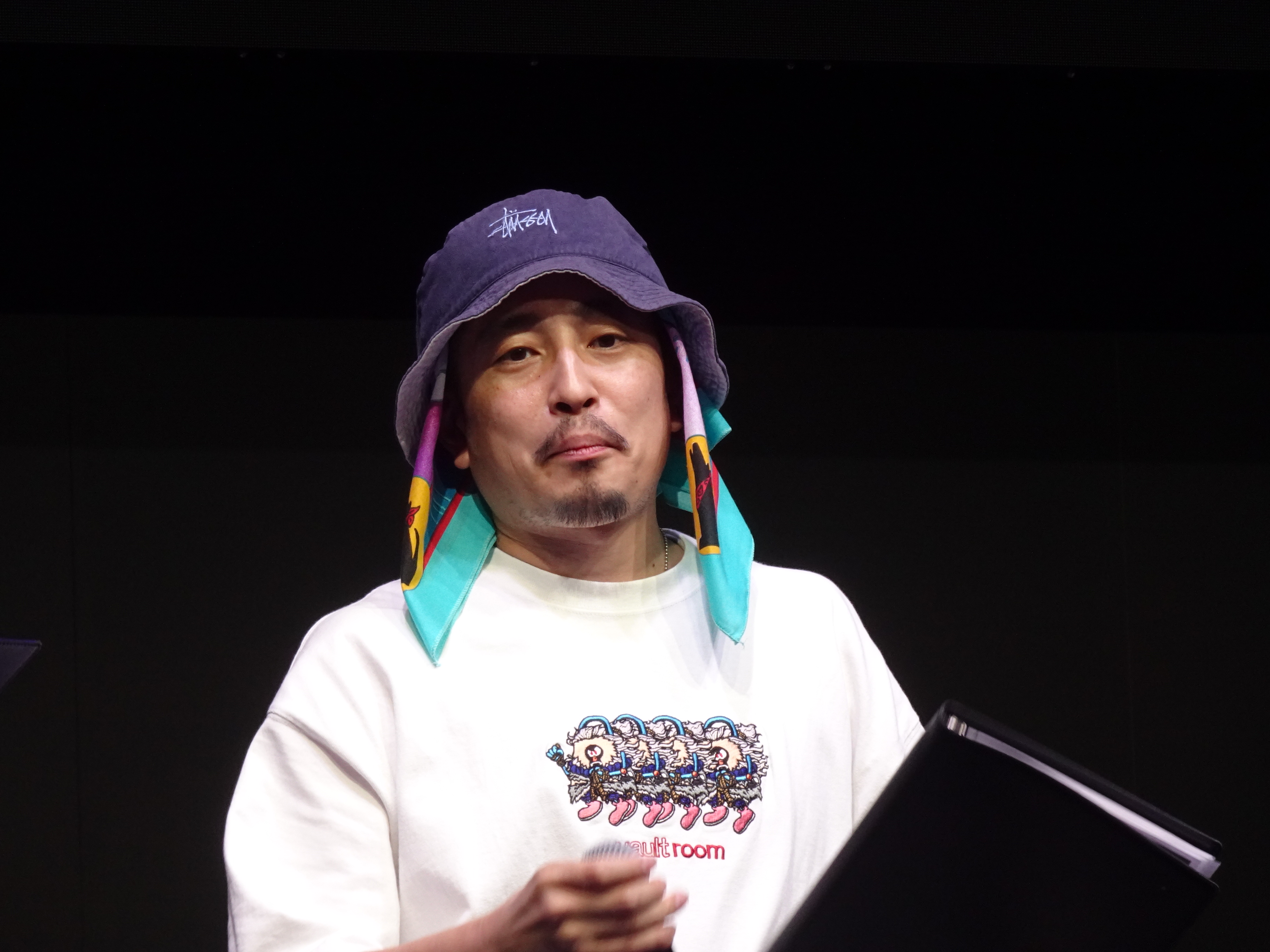
Producer Shuhei Matsumoto at Tokyo Game Show 2024 on September 29, 2024

Capcom posted a "Capcom Countdown" timer on February 14, 2022, with an announcement pending once the clock finished its seven-day countdown. On February 21, 2022, Street Fighter 6 was announced, teasing the return of Ryu and Luke, the latter of whom debuted in Street Fighter V's final downloadable content "season."

Street Fighter 6 marks the first game since Street Fighter III without the involvement of former producer Yoshinori Ono, who left Capcom in 2020, as well as the first entry to appear on an Xbox console since IV as a result of Street Fighter V's PS4 exclusivity. It is the first Street Fighter game since Street Fighter III to be fully developed by Capcom. Street Fighter IV, Street Fighter X Tekken and Street Fighter V were co-developed with Dimps.

On June 2, 2022, a gameplay trailer was shown at PlayStation's June State of Play. The trailer announced the World Tour, Battle Hub and Fighting Grounds modes, showed the return of Chun-Li, and introduced two new characters named Jamie and Kimberly. The game was released on June 2, 2023, on PlayStation 4, PlayStation 5, Windows, and Xbox Series X/S with an in-game commentary feature, a series first. It was developed on the RE Engine, and supports cross-platform play and rollback netcode. The official announcement of the release date took place at The Game Awards 2022.

The first closed beta took place from October 7, 2022, to October 11, 2022, with eight playable characters, and crossplay between Xbox, Steam and PlayStation. The second closed beta occurred between December 16 and December 19. Applications to access the beta version were chosen by lottery. A demo featuring a portion of the game's World Tour mode and Luke and Ryu as the only two playable characters in Fighting Ground was released for PlayStation 4 and PlayStation 5 on April 20, 2023, with a release for other platforms on April 26.

An arcade version was announced on December 9, 2022. Published by Taito for NESiCAxLive-compatible cabinets, it was released in Japan under the title Street Fighter 6 Type Arcade on December 14, 2023, and it only focuses on the "Fighting Ground" mode. The first game's battle pass was delayed following days of network problems. On November 21, 2023, it was announced that all 18 launch characters will each get a third outfit. The third outfits were released on December 1, 2023.

On April 2, 2025, it was announced that Street Fighter 6 would be one of the launch games for Nintendo Switch 2 on June 5, 2025. Additionally, a Game-Key Card version of the game titled Street Fighter 6 Years 1-2 Fighters Edition was released containing the license to download the base game, as well as a download code for the DLC characters from Season 1 and 2 Passes. In additions to the exclusive three Amiibo, based on Luke, Jamie and Kimberly, this version of the game is also compatible with the Ryu, Ken and Terry Amiibo figures from the Super Smash Bros. series line, along with a series of Street Fighter Amiibo cards.

=== Collaborations ===
In August 2023, at EVO 2023, a limited-time collaboration with Nickelodeon's Teenage Mutant Ninja Turtles was announced for release later that month, adding character costumes and other cosmetics to game. A collaboration with the manga and anime series Spy × Family was announced in July 2023 to promote the launch of the film Spy × Family Code: White. A special animation by Wit Studio of Chun-Li battling Yor Forger was released in December 2023. Cosmetics based on the series were available for purchase for a limited time during January 2024. Avatar cosmetics were made available for a collaboration with manga series Baki the Grappler in August 2024.

As part of the game's second season of downloadable content, protagonists Terry Bogard and Mai Shiranui from SNK's Fatal Fury series were added as playable characters. In exchange, it was confirmed at the 2024 Tokyo Game Show that Ken and Chun-Li would appear in the upcoming Fatal Fury: City of the Wolves as part of its first season of downloadable content in 2025. Capcom also released several collaborations with their own series Monster Hunter, Ace Attorney, and Rival Schools in early 2025. A collaboration with South Korean girl group Aespa was released on July 4, featuring a themed Battle Hub, as well as Juri's Outfit 4 and an announcer pack featuring Naevis among other cosmetics. To celebrate the 30th anniversary of Spike Chunsoft's Banshee's Last Cry visual novel, a special event was held in October 2025 that added avatar outfit pieces and a substory recreating the game's events in World Tour.

As part of the game's Year 4 downloadable content, Capcom announced at Summer Game Fest in June 2026 that Tifa Lockhart from Square Enix's Final Fantasy franchise would be added to the roster as a guest character in early 2027, both commemorating the 30th anniversary of Final Fantasy VII, as well to promote the launch of Final Fantasy VII Revelation around that period. Speaking to IGN, game director Takayuki Nakayama explained that Capcom had begun discussing Tifa's inclusion around three years prior through a mutual friend who was affiliated with Square Enix, and that reference materials were being provided by the Square Enix Creative Studio I team throughout development, with Final Fantasy VII character designer and Remake series creative director Tetsuya Nomura having final approval over the character's depiction in Street Fighter 6.

=== Manga and comic prequels ===
Street Fighter 6 has two prequel comic prints:

- Days of Eclipse, a prequel comic book series by Udon Entertainment, was announced on November 9, 2022. It explains how the game heavily focuses on Ken, Chun-Li, Kimberly and Luke's stories. The comic was released on May 5, 2023, digitally, and was released in bookstores on May 6, 2023.
- Luke Rising, a prequel manga series was announced and released at Weekly CoroCoro Comic in June 2025. It takes place prior to Days of Eclipse, which stars Luke as its titular protagonist, with Lily and Blanka-chan are his primary companions during his journey. It also features one of the playable characters' arcade stories, which themselves also took place prior to Days of Eclipse, such as Ed.

=== Music ===
The main theme song for the game is titled "Not on the Sidelines", produced by GRP and rappers Rocco 808 and Randy Marx. The official video clip of the song also features artists Sumi Oshima and Benny Diar, and is directed and edited by Ross Harris. According to lead composer Yoshiya Terayama, the soundtrack was influenced by hip-hop culture and intended to represent "a new generation for the series." Rather than arranging motifs, the character theme songs are based on new compositions, with the concept being the characters if they appeared on the streets. New music tracks from various guest artists, including Yoko Shimomura and JAM Project, have been added to the game via updates.

== Reception ==
Reception

Aggregate scores
Aggregator	Score
Metacritic	(PC) 92/100 (PS5) 92/100 (XSXS) 90/100 (NS2) 87/100
OpenCritic	98% recommend

Review scores
Publication	Score
Destructoid	9.5/10
Digital Trends	4.5/5
Eurogamer	4/5
Famitsu	10/10/10/10 (Note: Each of the four reviewers in Famitsu scored the game on a ten point scale)
Game Informer	9.5/10
GameRevolution	8/10
GameSpot	9/10
GamesRadar+	5/5
IGN	9/10
PC Gamer (US)	89/100
PCGamesN	9/10
Push Square	9/10
Shacknews	9/10
The Guardian	5/5
Video Games Chronicle	5/5
VG247	5/5

Street Fighter 6 received "universal acclaim" from critics, according to review aggregator website Metacritic. OpenCritic determined that 98% of critics recommended the game.

The Guardian praised Street Fighter 6's netcode, writing: "the online component actually works, and works well, right out of the gate". PCMag liked the character creator, feeling it had a vast number of options: "there are a ridiculous number of body, eye, hair, nose, and voice options for creating a goofy, imaginative, or realistic martial artist". Game Informer wrote that the Drive System was a great addition, that it sets "up a compelling risk/reward dynamic that tinges on every interaction".

PCGamesN criticized the World Tour mode's storytelling as a disappointment, but noted that Capcom learned from its past mistakes and made the most "feature-packed fighting game yet", and that the expansive scope of [Street Fighter 6] will satisfy players with its abundant content without waiting for an Ultimate Edition to be released. Ars Technica enjoyed the accessibility options included: "Blind and sight-impaired Street Fighter players will find a wealth of new options to help them play, like sounds that indicate distance to an opponent or if an attack hit high, mid, or low. It's a really thoughtful touch, and I'm not aware of any other game doing something similar".

=== Sales ===
Street Fighter 6 sold over 1 million units within five days after launch. By June 2025, sales had surpassed 5 million units. As of June 2026, the game has sold 7 million units.

In Japan, the PlayStation 5 version of Street Fighter 6 was the third highest selling physical game during its first week of release, with 21,192 retail units being sold across the country. The PlayStation 4 version was the fourth highest selling physical game in Japan throughout the same week, selling 12,078 retail units. It was the 17th best-selling video game in the US in 2023.

=== Awards ===
List of awards for Street Fighter 6
Year	Award	Category	Result	Ref.
2023	Golden Joystick Awards	Ultimate Game of the Year	Nominated	
2023	Golden Joystick Awards	Best Multiplayer Game	Nominated	
2023	Golden Joystick Awards	Best Visual Design	Nominated	
2023	Golden Joystick Awards	PlayStation Game of the Year	Nominated	
2023	The Game Awards 2023	Best Fighting Game	Won	
2023	The Game Awards 2023	Best Multiplayer Game	Nominated	
2023	The Game Awards 2023	Innovation in Accessibility	Nominated	
2024	27th Annual D.I.C.E. Awards	Fighting Game of the Year	Won	
2024	27th Annual D.I.C.E. Awards	Online Game of the Year	Nominated	
2024	Japan Game Awards 2024	Award for Excellence	Won	
2024	Japan Game Awards 2024	Special Award	Won	
