= Fatal Fury =

- Genre: Fighting
- Developers: SNK: Takara; Gaibrain; Aspect; Magical Company; System Prisma; Sun L; Monolith Corp.; Mutech; Funcom; JVC; JHV; Mine Loader Software; SIMS; Kinesoft; Yumekobo; Japan Vistec; Dotemu; Code Mystics; M2; KOF Studio
- Publishers: SNK: Takara; Sega; Magical Company; Hudson Soft; JVC; GameBank; CyberFront; Sony Computer Entertainment Europe; Agetec; SNK Playmore; D4 Enterprise; HAMSTER
- Creator: Takashi Nishiyama
- Platform: List: Arcade Dreamcast FM Towns Game Boy Windows Neo Geo Neo Geo CD Neo Geo Pocket Color Nintendo Switch Nintendo Switch 2 PC Engine PlayStation PlayStation 2 PlayStation 4 PlayStation 5 PlayStation Vita Sega CD Game Gear Genesis/Mega Drive Saturn SNES X68000 Xbox Live Arcade Xbox One Xbox Series X/S
- First release: Fatal Fury: King of Fighters; November 25, 1991
- Latest release: Fatal Fury: City of the Wolves; April 24, 2025

Fatal Fury, known as Garō Densetsu (餓狼伝説, Legend of the Hungry Wolf) in Japan, is a fighting game series developed by SNK, first released on SNK's Neo Geo system. Similar to other games from the genre, the franchise involves rounds where the player is given access to both combos and special techniques needed to defeat enemies. The franchise was started by Fatal Fury: King of Fighters (1991), and has come to include several spin-offs and anime adaptations.

Though only three characters were playable in the first installment, the cast was expanded with each new game. The story focuses on the antagonism between the children of the late Jeff Bogard, Terry and Andy, and the South Town crime lord Geese Howard as well as several fighters allied with both factions to see which side will win in a series of fighting competitions. This original story arc ends with the fourth instalment, Real Bout Fatal Fury (1995), with Geese's son Rock Howard taking over as protagonist in Garou: Mark of the Wolves (1999) to find the mystery behind his legacy. After Mark of the Wolves, the failure of the Neo Geo's successor and SNK's bankruptcy contributed to the end of the Fatal Fury franchise, until its 26-years hiatus was ended with Fatal Fury: City of the Wolves (2025), released on most modern system, which ends Rock's arc while giving the player new forms of exploring each character's role in the story for the first time.

Fatal Fury: King of Fighters was designed by Takashi Nishiyama, the creator of the original Street Fighter (1987) at Capcom. After leaving Capcom for SNK, Nishiyama wanted to create a fighting game with a storyline and characters that were easier to empathize with, something he wasn't able to achieve with Street Fighter. Fatal Fury inspired multiple sequels published by SNK following its success. There have also been several original video animations (OVA) and manga adaptation based on the story. Its IP and Art of Fighting share the same continuity by placing a younger Geese in the second installment, Art of Fighting 2 whereas Art of Fighting lead Ryo Sakazaki would return in the remake Fatal Fury: Wild Ambition. Both Fatal Fury and Art of Fighting became the basis for the later The King of Fighters games by SNK where Terry, Ryo and other SNK protagonists fight alongside other crossover characters created by SNK in new tournaments. Critical response to Fatal Fury was positive, drawing positive comparison to Street Fighter II based on special moves and visuals.

== Gameplay ==
Gameplay screenshot showcasing a match with Terry Bogard performing his signature "Power Wave" move against Richard Myer

The original Fatal Fury is known for the two-plane system in which characters fight from two different planes. By stepping between the planes, attacks can be dodged with ease. Later games have dropped the two-plane system, replacing it with a complex system of dodging, including simple half second dodges into the background and a three plane system. Characters have moves that can attack across the two planes, attack both planes at once, or otherwise attack dodge characters. The plane system was fully abandoned from later releases beginning with Garou: Mark of the Wolves.

Later Fatal Fury games have experimented with various mechanical changes. "Ring-outs" allow a character to lose the round if the character is thrown into the edges of the fighting backdrop; single-plane backdrops, where dodging is eliminated altogether, causing moves that send opponents to the opposite plane to do collateral damage. The "Deadly Rave" is a super combo used by several characters, where after execution, a player had to press a preset series of buttons with exact timing for the entire combo to execute. The "Just Defend" is a type of protected block in which players regained lost life, did not wear down the player's guard crush meter and removed all block stuns making combo interruptions smoother.

== Plot ==
=== Setting ===
Fatal Fury and its sister series, Art of Fighting, are set in the same fictional universe; while Art of Fighting takes place in the late 1970s, the story of Fatal Fury begins over a decade later in the early 1990s. The two series are set primarily in the same fictional city of "South Town", loosely based on the real-life city of Miami. The Wolves sub-series takes place in the neighboring city of "Second Southtown".

Many characters from both Fatal Fury and Art of Fighting appear in The King of Fighters series, which is set in its own universe that ignores the continuity established in the Fatal Fury and Art of Fighting games so that the characters from both series could battle without having to age any of them.

=== Characters ===
As with most fighting games, the Fatal Fury series has an extensive cast of characters that increases with each installment. The series' primary protagonists include martial artists Terry Bogard, Andy Bogard and Joe Higashi, all introduced in the original game, and female ninja Mai Shiranui, introduced in Fatal Fury 2; these four characters have appeared in every series entry since their debut, with the exception of Garou: Mark of the Wolves. The series' most prominent antagonist is Geese Howard, a crime lord in South Town responsible for the death of the Bogard brothers' father, who is often accompanied by his right-hand man Billy Kane. Other members of Geese's family have appeared as major antagonists throughout the series, including half brother Wolfgang Krauser; distant relatives the Jin brothers; and brother-in-law Kain R. Heinlein.

Garou: Mark of the Wolves acts as a soft reboot of the series, taking place ten years after the previous games and featuring an almost entirely new cast of fighters, with the story primarily focusing on Rock Howard, son of Geese Howard and protégé of Terry Bogard. Terry, now completely redesigned, is the only returning character in Mark of the Wolves; however, other legacy Fatal Fury characters return in its sequel, City of the Wolves.

Certain characters are shared with the Art of Fighting series to more closely establish continuity between the two; for example, Art of Fighting 2 features Geese Howard and depicts his initial rise to power in South Town, while multiple Art of Fighting characters appear in City of the Wolves. Some characters have also made appearances outside the Fatal Fury series, particularly in The King of Fighters.

=== Story ===
In 1981, ten years prior to the events of Fatal Fury: King of Fighters, Terry and his brother Andy are adopted by Jeff Bogard, only for Jeff to be killed in front of them by his former rival Geese Howard. Determined, the brothers spend the next decade training to become stronger, meeting new allies Joe Higashi and Mai Shiranui, before returning to South Town to participate in the "King of Fighters" fighting tournament being held by Geese. After winning the tournament, Terry and Geese have a showdown at the top of Geese Tower, and Geese is sent falling from the building, believed to be dead. One year later in Fatal Fury 2, Geese's half brother Wolfgang Krauser hosts a new global King of Fighters tournament in a bid to draw out Geese's killers and prove himself stronger. At the end of the tournament, Terry defeats Krauser, who is believed to have taken his own life in shame.

In Fatal Fury 3, set three years later, Terry and his friends learn that Geese survived his fall using a magic scroll, and now seeks to recover the three legendary Sacred Scrolls of Jin, said to imbue their user with great power. With the scrolls spotted in South Town, Terry and the others race to recover the scrolls before Geese while also contending with Jin Chonshu and Jin Chonrei, two Chinese orphans possessed by the spirits of their ancestors that seek to use the scrolls to resurrect themselves. Geese recovers the scrolls, but chooses to destroy them so they cannot be used against him. In Real Bout: Fatal Fury, to assert his power, Geese holds another "King of Fighters" tournament, which culminates in a final battle between him and Terry. Geese is once again knocked from his tower, and though Terry tries to save him, Geese refuses and willingly falls to his death. Seeking to end the cycle of violence, Terry decides to raise Geese's now orphaned young son, Rock Howard.

The story continues in Garou: Mark of the Wolves, taking place ten years later. Terry and the now grown up Rock are invited to participate in the new "King of Fighters: Maximum Mayhem" tournament. The two later learn that it was organized by Rock's maternal uncle, Kain R. Heinlein, who seeks to use Geese's legacy to make Second Southtown an independent city-state. When Kain reveals that Rock's mother Marie is still alive, Rock leaves Terry to go with Kain in order to learn the truth and save his mother. One year later in Fatal Fury: City of the Wolves, Kain's investigations determine Marie has been held captive by Mr. Big, who demands Geese's legacy in exchange for her freedom. Billy Kane reveals to Rock that Geese's legacy includes the Sacred Scrolls, which Billy had preserved and given Geese fakes of to destroy. Before Billy can give Rock the legacy, all of it is stolen by an unknown figure. Days later, a new King of Fighters tournament is announced by Krauser's son, Franz Stroheim, with the stolen legacy offered as the prize. Rock, Kain, Billy, Terry, and several others enter the tournament to retrieve the legacy and rescue Marie. While Marie is successfully rescued, an accident causes Rock to become possessed by the Sacred Scrolls' curse due to being a distant descendant of the Jin family. Terry and the others free Rock from his possession and destroy the scrolls. Six months later, Krauser returns, having faked his death, and begins a plan to take revenge on Terry and seize control of South Town.

Several other Fatal Fury games have been released, though these games' stories are not a part of the main series canon. These include Fatal Fury: Wild Ambition, which retells the story of the original game with characters from later entries, and Real Bout Fatal Fury Special: Dominated Mind, in which new protagonist Alfred stops the evil White from filling the power vacuum in South Town after Geese's death.

== Development ==
Series producers Takashi Nishiyama (Fatal Fury~Real Bout Fatal Fury 2) and Hiroshi Matsumoto (Fatal Fury 3~Mark of the Wolves), were the planners of the original Street Fighter (where they were credited as Piston Takashi and Finish Hiroshi). Matsumoto is also the creator of the Art of Fighting series. Developed at the same time as Capcom's own Street Fighter sequel, Nishiyama referred to Fatal Fury as "my Street Fighter II." Veteran developer Yasuyuki Oda believes the detailed facial expressions and 2D backgrounds were the secret behind Fatal Fury's fame. Oda also believes the fact that the cast does not look like actual fighters left a major impact.

Nishiyama originally created Terry for Street Fighter as a Caucasian man wearing a leather jacket; they decided to make the main playable character a dougi-clad karateka name Ryu instead. They still wanted to use this concept in a game; after their move to SNK, they implemented him as a playable character in Fatal Fury. Terry's original appearance was made with the intention that he did not look like a martial artist, contrasting the looks of his brother Andy. In the making of the series, Terry and his brother Andy were characterized as the heroic leads, contrasting with the comical Joe Higashi. Although Geese was not modeled after any famous person or fictional character, SNK based him on Italian mafia. Geese became famous for his special moves which allows him to interrupt the player's attacks and counterattack in a grab. Sub-boss Billy Kane obtained similar fame with both Geese and him having The Godfather-like influences that were expanded on later games. SNK was surprised by Geese's popularity in the Fatal Fury series, topping Terry Bogard in terms of fan response in regard to what players wanted as playable character. Oda reflected that both Art of Fighting and the other IP, Fatal Fury, seemed to appeal to fans of male-oriented series like Fist of the North Star and Dragon Ball. The inclusion of several macho fighters led to the dilemma of including more female characters, with Mai Shiranui standing out as SNK's first female fighter. With Mai's high popularity in Fatal Fury, SNK decided to include Yuri Sakazaki in Art of Fighting 2 as a playable character, which received a similar response.

In the planning stage of Fatal Fury Special, bringing Ryo Sakazaki to the installment was elaborated by planner planner Oda; He believes Ryo fits the cast due to how the franchise borrowed Desperation Moves from Art of Fighting and how it revolutionized the idea of the crossover concept that would conceptualize The King of Fighters. However, as Ryo was announced at the Tokyo Game Show, Oda found such an unpredicted reveal awkward; Fatal Fury Special had several issues at launch in every single console and unlocking Ryo as a hidden boss was too challenging. Real Bout Fatal Fury was originally created with the goal of putting an end to the series' story with Geese Howard's death in the ending, but Geese's high popularity resulted in Real Bout Special having him again. SNK redesigned the controls and battles, and improved the sense of exhilaration and ease of use by adding two health bars and flashy effects. To achieve this, they made the decision to bring most of the processing that was highly praised in Fatal Fury 3 to the foreground in Real Bout. In retrospect, Yasuyuki Oda believes Real Bout was a masterpiece.

Garou: Mark of the Wolves' development team was formed during the NeoGeo era of SNK. Several artists worked on it, as SNK was developing two new installments based on the Fatal Fury series: the 3D fighting game remake of the first game, Fatal Fury: Wild Ambition and Garou: Mark of the Wolves. Hiroaki Hashimoto was a minor artist, as he moved to become the main artist of Wild Ambition and the new game Buriki One, while Tonko remained as the main illustrator for the sequences and character illustrations. Meanwhile, Shinkiro did not return to work on either of these installments because he was busy illustrating The King of Fighters. Multiple changes to Garou: Mark of the Wolves were made to show a bigger difference from previous games, due to most characters being new. The King of Fighters is commonly associated with Kyo Kusanagi and Iori Yagami from the series with the same name, rather than Fatal Fury characters. As a result, the new tournament was dubbed "Maximum Mayhem King of Fighters" to give a new tension to associate the new characters by giving the city of Southtown more emphasis to the narrative. Rock's character and entire personality served as the main basis for the game. This led to the creation of supporting characters like B. Jenet or Terry Bogard's redesign. Since Rock was the protagonist, the cast gave full attention to him. Nobyuki Kuroki tried giving him his own style of cool which he hoped would attract gamers. The character of Rock Howard was created by Nobuyuki Kuroki in 1998. Both he and Yasuyuki Oda wondered what type of hero would succeed Terry Bogard in Fatal Fury's latest game, Garou: Mark of the Wolves. While they were not confident with Rock, they still decided to make him as the new protagonist. The story was written with a cliffhanger from the get go, thus leaving open the possibility for a potential sequel. New moves were created for both Rock and B. Jenet before development was put on hold. Ideas for a sequel were revealed in June 2016; SNK revealed artwork and sprites of the cast of the cancelled Neo Geo version. SNK director Nobuyuki Kuroki stated in February 2020 that he was personally interested in 'reviving' the Fatal Fury series.

== Games ==
Titles in the Fatal Fury series
English title	Original platform	Release date	Ports
Fatal Fury: King of Fighters	Neo Geo	1991-11-25	Neo Geo (MVS, AES) Neo Geo CD, Genesis, X68000, SNES, PlayStation 2, PSN, PlayStation 4, Nintendo Switch, Xbox One
Fatal Fury 2	Neo Geo	1992-12-10	Neo Geo (MVS, AES) Neo Geo CD, PC Engine, Genesis, SNES, Game Boy, X68000, PlayStation 2, Nintendo Switch, Xbox One
Fatal Fury Special	Neo Geo	1993-09-16	Neo Geo (MVS, AES), FM Towns, Game Gear, Neo Geo, Neo Geo CD, Sega CD, SNES, TurboGrafx-CD, PlayStation 2, X68000, Xbox Live Arcade, iOS, Nintendo Switch, Windows, Xbox One
Fatal Fury 3: Road to the Final Victory	Neo Geo	1995-03-27	Neo Geo (MVS, AES), Neo Geo CD, Saturn, Windows, PlayStation 2, Nintendo Switch, Xbox One
Real Bout Fatal Fury	Neo Geo	1995-12-21	Neo Geo (MVS, AES), Neo-Geo CD, Saturn, PlayStation, PlayStation 2, PSN, PlayStation 4, Nintendo Switch, Xbox One
Real Bout Fatal Fury Special	Neo Geo	1997-01-28	Neo Geo (MVS, AES), Neo-Geo CD, Saturn, Game Boy, PlayStation 2, PSN, PlayStation 4, Nintendo Switch, Xbox One
Real Bout Fatal Fury 2: The Newcomers	Neo Geo	1998-03-20	Neo Geo (MVS, AES), Neo-Geo CD, PlayStation 2, PlayStation 4, Nintendo Switch, Windows, Xbox One
Real Bout Special: Dominated Mind	PlayStation	1998-06-25	PlayStation, PSN
Fatal Fury: Wild Ambition	Hyper Neo Geo 64	1999-01-28	Hyper Neo Geo 64, PlayStation, PSN
Fatal Fury: First Contact	Neo Geo Pocket Color	1999-04-30	Neo Geo Pocket Color, Nintendo Switch
Garou: Mark of the Wolves	Neo Geo	1999-11-26	Neo Geo (MVS, AES), Dreamcast, PlayStation 2, Xbox Live Arcade, iOS, PlayStation 4, PlayStation Vita, Nintendo Switch, Windows, Xbox One
Fatal Fury: City of the Wolves	PlayStation 4 PlayStation 5 Windows; Xbox Series X/S	2025-04-24	PlayStation 4, PlayStation 5, Windows, Xbox Series X/S, Nintendo Switch 2

=== Main games ===
Original series

- Fatal Fury — The first game of the Fatal Fury series allowed players to select one of three characters, Terry Bogard, Andy Bogard, and Joe Higashi, as they fight against eight computer-controlled opponents, ending with Billy Kane and Geese Howard. When a second player joins in, they have the option of either playing cooperatively with the other player against the CPU or competitively against each other. The game was ported to SNES and Sega Genesis by Takara.
- Fatal Fury 2 — The immediate sequel revamped the controls from the original game, adding punch and kick buttons of different strength levels and allowing the player to change between fighting lanes at will. Terry, Andy, and Joe return, along with five new playable characters (including Mai Shiranui and Kim Kaphwan). This time, the player faces off against the other seven characters (as well as a clone of their own character) before fighting against four computer-only bosses, culminating with the new antagonist Wolfgang Krauser. The game was ported once again to the SNES and Genesis by Takara. A PC Engine Super CD-ROM² was also released by Hudson Soft in Japan, which utilized the Arcade Card.
- Fatal Fury 3: Road to the Final Victory — Fatal Fury 3 revamps the previous lane changing system and introduces a new type of combo techniques known as "Combination Arts". Terry, Andy, Joe, Mai, and Geese return from Fatal Fury Special, along with five new playable characters (including Blue Mary), along with three boss characters (Ryuji Yamazaki, Jin Chonshu, and Jin Chonrei), for a total of thirteen playable characters. It was ported by SNK to the Sega Saturn. A Windows 95 version was also released by Cyberfront.

Real Bout sub-series

- Real Bout Fatal Fury — Real Bout Fatal Fury simplifies the controls and introduces a "Power Gauge" allowing the player to perform super-powered special moves. The Fatal Fury 3 character roster returned (with the boss characters now being regular characters), along with Duck King, Kim Kaphwan, and Billy Kane from Fatal Fury Special. Geese Howard reclaimed his status from the first game as the final boss. This game was also released for the PlayStation (in Japan and Europe) and the Sega Saturn (in Japan only).
- Real Bout Fatal Fury 2: The Newcomers — The final game in the Real Bout sub-series, Real Bout Fatal Fury 2 retains twenty of the characters from Real Bout Special and introduces two new characters; Li Xiangfei and Rick Strowd. The game also featured a new secret challenger named Alfred.

Wolves sub-series

- Garou: Mark of the Wolves — The last 2D era Fatal Fury game released for the Neo Geo. Set a decade after Real Bout Special, Terry Bogard returns along with a new cast of characters, including new protagonist Rock Howard, Geese's son and Terry's protégé, for a total of fourteen playable characters. The lane-change system was discarded in favor of techniques such as "Just Defend". It was ported to the Dreamcast (released under the title Fatal Fury: Mark of the Wolves) and PlayStation 2 (in Japan only).
- Fatal Fury: City of the Wolves — A 2.5D Fatal Fury game. In addition to returning Mark of the Wolves characters, City of the Wolves marks the return of other characters from previous Fatal Fury games, and features real-life celebrities and fighters from Capcom's Street Fighter as special guests.

=== Side games ===
Special sub-series

- Fatal Fury Special — An updated and refined version of Fatal Fury 2, including faster game speed. The roster of twelve characters from Fatal Fury 2 returned, with the four CPU boss characters now playable, along with three returning characters from the original Fatal Fury (Duck King, Tung Fu Rue, and Geese Howard). Ryo Sakazaki from Art of Fighting appears as a secret final boss. The game was once again ported to the SNES by Takara, with a Sega CD version by JVC, and a PC Engine version by Hudson Soft (once again utilizing the Arcade Card).
- Real Bout Fatal Fury Special — Like Fatal Fury Special, Real Bout Fatal Fury Special retained many of the characters from the classic Fatal Fury games; Cheng Sinzan, Laurence Blood, Tung Fu Rue, and Wolfgang Krauser return from Fatal Fury Special. All sixteen of the characters from Real Bout Fatal Fury return, with Geese Howard now being a secret final boss and hidden playable character. "Extra" versions of Andy Bogard, Tung Fu Rue, Blue Mary, and Billy Kane also appear as secret characters. It was also released for the Sega Saturn in Japan only. Iori Yagami from The King of Fighters series is also a playable character in the Game Boy version.
  - Real Bout Garou Densetsu Special: Dominated Mind — A 1998 PlayStation game based on Real Bout Special, it features a new story mode starring Alfred (from Real Bout 2) as the main protagonist, and includes a new main antagonist named White, based upon Alex from the movie A Clockwork Orange. Dominated Mind discards the multi-lane system from the previous Fatal Fury games and introduces new moves such as hidden unlockable super moves and super cancel moves (known in the game as "Final Impacts").

Miscellaneous Entries

- Fatal Fury: First Contact — A portable fighting game loosely based on Real Bout 2. It featured the exclusive character Lao, playable only in the two-player versus mode, along with twelve of the characters from Real Bout 2.
- Fatal Fury: Wild Ambition — A 3D fighting game that retells the story of Fatal Fury, but with many of the original characters replaced with characters from the later sequels such as Mai, Kim, and Yamazaki, as well as introducing two new characters (Tsugumi Sendo and Toji Sakata). The PlayStation port of Wild Ambition featured an older Ryo Sakazaki as the new Mr. Karate (from Buriki One) and Duck King as secret characters.

=== Compilations ===
- Fatal Fury Battle Archives Volume 1 — Contains original versions of Fatal Fury, Fatal Fury 2, Fatal Fury Special and Fatal Fury 3. It has a language option for each game between Japanese and English. It was released in Japan in July 2006, and the United States in August 2007.
- Fatal Fury Battle Archives Volume 2 — Contains Real Bout Fatal Fury, Real Bout Fatal Fury Special and Real Bout Fatal Fury 2: The Newcomers. The language option offers Japanese, English, Spanish and Portuguese. It was released in Japan in February 2007, and the United States in April 2008.

== In other media ==
The Fatal Fury series inspired a trilogy of animated productions produced by NAS with SNK, featuring character designs by Masami Ōbari. The first is a television special that aired in 1992 on Fuji TV titled Fatal Fury: Legend of the Hungry Wolf (Battle Fighters Garou Densetsu), which adapts the plot of the first game. It was followed in 1993 by another television special Fatal Fury 2: The New Battle (Battle Fighters Garou Densetsu 2) based on the second game, which also aired on Fuji TV. A theatrically released film followed in 1994, titled Fatal Fury: The Motion Picture (Garou Densetsu: The Motion Picture), which features an original plot and new characters. The first two TV specials were released on a single laserdisc and later on DVD.

VIZ Communications picked up the license for the trilogy and produced English dubbed versions of each of them, releasing them straight to VHS, and later on DVD. They were later released subtitled, with the first two Fatal Fury specials released in one video titled Fatal Fury One-Two Punch. The subbed version of Fatal Fury 2 features a scene involving a rematch between Joe Higashi and Big Bear (Raiden) that was cut from the dubbed version. The English DVD release of the TV specials, Fatal Fury: Double Impact, features this scene. If chosen to be viewed with the English dub, it would temporarily go onto Japanese with English subtitles during this scene.

Many soundtracks, manga comics, other books, video tapes, and drama CDs have been released in Japan for the series as a whole and for each of its individual entries. A brief OVA set after the events of Mark of the Wolves, titled Memories of Stray Wolves, was packaged with the 15th anniversary soundtrack collection. The events of the first game were also loosely adapted in the web series The King of Fighters: Destiny.

Characters from Fatal Fury have gone on to make guest appearances in various fighting games such as Dead or Alive 5: Last Round, Tekken 7, Fighting EX Layer, Super Smash Bros. Ultimate, and Street Fighter 6, as well as games from other genres such as Fall Guys.

== Reception ==
Paul Rand of Computer and Video Games called Fatal Fury one of the best Neo Geo games available in 1992 and compared it favorably with Street Fighter II, stating Fatal Fury was a "brilliant feast of fighting" with "huge and excellently drawn" character sprites, great animation, and unique special attacks "giving the game more variety." It went on to be Japan's fourth highest-grossing arcade game of 1992, below Street Fighter II (two versions) and Captain Commando. Fatal Fury 2 was generally very well-received by Western game critics upon its release. GamePro review of the Neo Geo version praised the "action-packed" gameplay, "Street Fighter-tough" challenge, "great" character graphics and animation, "slick scrolling" backgrounds, and "fantastic" sound, concluding it to be an "awesome sequel" that "ranks up there with the Numero Uno fighting game." Reviewing the SNES version of the game, EGM called it "one of the better fighting games ported to the SNES" and awarded it Game of the Month. During the mid 1990s, The King of Fighters was SNK's most popular IP as their other famous works like Art of Fighting 3 and Fatal Fury 3 were poorly received by the gamers. Though Fatal Fury saw a revival through Real Bout Fatal Fury and Garou: Mark of the Wolves, these two games were released during the time SNK went bankrupt leaving the company to mainly focus on KOF.

GameSpot reviewer Frank Provo comments that Geese's introduction in Fatal Fury is one of the biggest accomplishments from the game as he notes how Geese continues appearing in other games. Avi Krebs from Gamingexcellence.com noted that Geese was the hardest character of the series to defeat and jokingly commented that even though he fights "while wearing a wristwatch, he pulls out all the tricks possible". IGN writer Ryan Clements agreed with Avi Krebs saying that Geese is "almost physically impossible to beat". He also mentioned that due to how difficult Geese is, almost twelve different IGN people had to help Clements to win, being only able to defeat him "resorting to the cheapest, most absurd tactics possible". Eric Bratcher from GamesRadar commented that Geese is "the big hook" from the series along with Terry Bogard, labelling Geese as "nearly un-killable". The Gamer commented that while Geese dies in Real Bout Fatal Fury, his returns in The King of Fighters with XV retaining scrolls with potential for immortality have potential to revive him like other villains in gaming who die several times like Dracula from Castlevania. Red Bull regarded Geese as one of the "cheapest" fighting game characters for the challenges he gives the players enough to annoy them. The animation of Mai's breasts in Fatal Fury 2 has been cited as one of the earliest examples of breast physics in video games, a conception that later games have steadily tried to refine, though Mai has remained the most prominent example in 2D animation of the concept. Brett Elston of GamesRadar+ emphasized that while female fighting game characters were prominent in the 1990s, with each new game often trying to out-sexualize the others, gaming periodicals were "abuzz with commentary on what Mai's bobbing bosom meant for the industry", with Elston comparing it to "witnessing (half-naked) women entering the workplace for the first time".

Ryo Sakazaki has also been popular for his crossover appeal in Fatal Fury and The King of Fighters. Rolling Stone said Ryo's popularity in Fatal Fury Special was so famous that it inspired the concept of The King of Fighters whereas the Capcom VS. SNK was also popular for making the Art of Fighting duo be able to face their own parody, Dan Hibiki. Den of Geek regarded his debut in Fatal Fury Special as the "first real fighting game crossover".

In GameSpot's article "The History of SNK", Garou and The King of Fighters '99: Evolution were described as one of the best fighting games on the Dreamcast.
