= Fatal Fury 2 =

1992 video game

- North American arcade flyer
- Developer: SNK (Note: X68000 version developed by System Prisma; Genesis/Mega Drive version developed by Gaibrain and Aspect; Game Boy version developed by Sun L.)
- Publisher: SNK: Super NES, Genesis/Mega Drive, Game Boy Takara X68000 Magical Company CD-ROM² Hudson Soft
- Series: Fatal Fury
- Platforms: Arcade, Neo Geo AES, Super NES, X68000, PC Engine CD-ROM², Genesis/Mega Drive, Game Boy, Neo Geo CD
- Release: November 1992: Arcade; NA: November 1992; JP: December 10, 1992 Neo Geo AES; WW: March 5, 1993 Super NES; JP: November 26, 1993; NA: April 1994; EU: 1994 X68000; JP: December 23, 1993 CD-ROM²; JP: March 12, 1994 Genesis/Mega Drive; NA: May 1994; JP: June 24, 1994; AU: 1994 Game Boy; JP: July 29, 1994 Neo Geo CD; JP: September 9, 1994; NA: October 1996
- Genre: Fighting
- Modes: Single-player, multiplayer
- Arcade system: Neo Geo MVS

Fatal Fury 2 (Note: Known in Japan as Garō Densetsu 2: Aratanaru Tatakai (Japanese: 餓狼伝説２ ～新たなる闘い～, Hepburn: Garō Densetsu 2: Aratanaru Tatakai; lit. "Hungry Wolf Legend 2: The New Battle")) is a 1992 fighting game developed and published by SNK for the Neo Geo arcade and home platforms. It is the second installment in the Fatal Fury franchise and the sequel to Fatal Fury: King of Fighters (1991). It was later ported to several home systems, including the Super Nintendo Entertainment System and Sega Genesis by Takara. Its updated version, Fatal Fury Special, was released in 1993.

The game introduced Kim Kaphwan, the first Taekwondo and the first Korean character in fighting games, and Mai Shiranui, one of SNK's mascots, their primary sex symbol, and one of the most well-known female video game characters. Both of them went on to become mainstays in both Fatal Fury games as well as The King of Fighters series.

== Gameplay ==
Gameplay screenshot showcasing a match between Mai Shiranui and Big Bear in Australia

Fatal Fury 2 was the second game in SNK's 100-Mega Shock series, offering improved graphics and gameplay over the original Fatal Fury: King of Fighters. The play controls were modified, this time making full use of the Neo-Geo's four button configuration, by including four attack buttons (Light Punch, Light Kick, Strong Punch, and Strong Kick). The player can also dash back from the opponent to retreat by quickly tapping the lever backwards twice.

The two-plane battle system from the first Fatal Fury has been retained. This time, the player can move freely to the adjacent plane by pressing the Light Punch and Light Kick buttons simultaneously for the "Plane Move". The player can also perform a "Power Attack" that will knock the opponent to the other plane. When the opponent is on the other plane, the player can press either a punch button to jump towards the opponent with a "Low Plane Move Attack" or either a kick button for a "High Plane Move Attack". Certain stages have hazards in the background plane, such as electrified wires or a stampede of bulls, and thus the player cannot change planes but can knock the opponent to the other plane to cause extra damage.

Other specialized techniques have been added as well. After the player guards an opponent's attack, they can follow it up with a special counterattack technique known as an "Evasion Attack". The player can also taunt the opponent by pressing the Strong Punch button from a distance. Fatal Fury 2 also introduces the "Desperation Move" (or "Fury"), a powerful type of Special Move which causes massive damage that can only be used when the player's life gauge is at 25% and flashing red.

The single-player mode has the player facing against all eight characters (including a clone of the player's character), followed by four non-playable boss characters. After every fourth match, the player will participate in a bonus round for more points.

== Plot ==
One year after the events of Fatal Fury: King of Fighters and the death of Geese Howard, a mysterious nobleman becomes the sponsor of a new "King of Fighters" tournament. This time, the tournament takes place around the world with both veterans and newcomers competing and battling against each other. As the single-player mode progresses, the mysterious nobleman begins defeating the participants from the first Fatal Fury game, searching for the man responsible for defeating Geese.

== Fighters ==
The character roster consists of eight selectable warriors: Terry, Andy and Joe from the original Fatal Fury, plus five newcomers. After defeating all eight playable characters in the single player tournament (including a clone of the player's character), the player faces four non-playable bosses.

Playable fighters:

- Terry Bogard - an American street fighting champion from South Town.
- Andy Bogard - Terry's younger brother and fellow ninjutsu practitioner alongside Mai Shiranui.
- Joe Higashi - a Japanese Muay Thai champion, and a friendly rival of the Bogard brothers.
- Big Bear - an Australian face wrestler, formerly a heel wrestler known as Raiden from the previous King of Fighters tournament.
- Jubei Yamada - an elderly Japanese judo sensei once known as "Yamada the Demon" during his handsome youth.
- Cheng Sinzan - a greedy and overweight Shifu of tai chi from Hong Kong who is seeking to create and open his own training hall.
- Kim Kaphwan - a taekwondo master from South Korea who fights in the name of justice.
- Mai Shiranui - a beautiful kunoichi who is the daughter of the Shiranui ninja clan's leader and is the self-proclaimed "fiancée" of Andy.

Bosses:

- Billy Kane - a bojutsu master from the United Kingdom who is seeking revenge on both the Bogard brothers and Joe for the death of Geese.
- Axel Hawk - a retired heavyweight boxing champion seeking to make his comeback.
- Laurence Blood - a former matador who uses a fighting style based on his bullfighting methods.
- Wolfgang Krauser - a German nobleman seeking to defeat the man who was responsible for Geese's downfall.

== Release ==
=== Home versions ===
In addition to the Neo Geo AES and Neo Geo CD home versions, a port of Fatal Fury 2 was released for the X68000 in Japan in 1993, followed by versions for the Sega Genesis/Mega Drive, PC Engine CD-ROM², Super Nintendo Entertainment System and Game Boy in early 1994. The SNES and Genesis versions were published by Takara, while the X68000 version, released only in Japan, was published by Mahou Kabushikigaisha (Magical Company). All three versions allow the player to control the four boss characters via their own respective codes. The CD-ROM² version was released by Hudson Soft in Japan only, and was one of the first games to require the Arcade Card add-on. To coincide with the Japanese release of the SNES version, Hori Electric released a special controller called the Fatal Fury 2 Commander, which has the power and super power moves of all the game's playable characters programmed in so that they can be triggered with a single button.

The original Neo Geo version of the game was later included in 2006's Fatal Fury: Battle Archive Volume 1 for the PlayStation 2 (with a choice between the original AES and CD soundtrack). It was also made available on the Wii's Virtual Console service in 2008. The SNES version was re-released on the Nintendo Classics service in 2025. Hamster Corporation re-released the game as part of their ACA Neo Geo series for the PlayStation 4, Xbox One, Nintendo Switch, Windows, Android and iOS.

=== Related media ===
Several licensed tie-ins were released for the game in Japan, including:

- Garou Densetsu 2 (餓狼伝説2) (PCCB-00111), a soundtrack CD from Pony Canyon;
- Garou Densetsu 2 (餓狼伝説2) (Gamest Extra No.91), a magazine-book from Shinseisha;
- Garou Densetsu 2 (餓狼伝説2 (Gamest Video Vol.2)) (ISBN 4-88199-091-8), a VHS guide from Shinseisha;
- Garou Densetsu 2 (1) Mondo Kei (餓狼伝説2 (1) MONDO.恵) (ISBN 4-88199-135-3) and Garou Densetsu 2 (2) Mondo Kei (餓狼伝説2 (2) MONDO.恵) (ISBN 4-88199-148-5), two-part official manga adaptation by Mondo Kei from Shinseisha;
- Garou Densetsu 2 4-Koma Ketteiban (餓狼伝説2 4コマ決定版) (Games Comics 4) (ISBN 4-88199-099-3), a 4-koma manga compilation by various authors from Shinseisha;
- Garou Densetsu 2 Fan Book (餓狼伝説2 ファンブック) (ISBN 4-7966-0768-4), a tribute book from Hippon Super;
- Garou Densetsu 2 Hisshō Kōryaku Hō (餓狼伝説2 必勝攻略法) (ISBN 4-575-28231-6), a guide book from Futabasha;
- Garou Densetsu 2 Hisshō Kōryaku Hon (餓狼伝説2 必勝攻略本) (Haoh Game Special 1) (ISBN 4-06-329201-0), a SNES guide book from Kodansha;
- Garou Densetsu 2 Oku Waza Densho Hen (餓狼伝説2 奥技伝承編) (PCVP-11177), a VHS tape from Pony Canyon.

=== Nettou Garou Densetsu 2 ===
The Game Boy version is titled Nettou Garou Densetsu 2 (熱闘餓狼伝説２; "Dead Heat Fighters Legend of the Hungry Wolf 2") and was released exclusively in Japan in 1994. This port features "super deformed" style graphics and, like the SNES, Mega Drive/Genesis, and X68000 ports, allows the player to use the four boss characters. However, due to the Game Boy's limited hardware, all voices have been removed, but in their place the characters have speech bubbles when performing a special attack or Desperation Move. This port also features support for the Super Game Boy peripheral for the SNES. In the Game Boy version, the text in the intro, post match dialogue, and character endings are in Japanese, while the character names, game credits, and menus are in English.

=== Fatal Fury Special ===
Fatal Fury Special (餓狼伝説SPECIAL, Garou Densetsu Special) was developed and published by SNK and originally released for the Neo Geo arcade and home platforms in 1993. It is an updated version of Fatal Fury 2, introducing several changes to the gameplay system while expanding the available character roster.

== Reception ==
Contemporary reviews

Aggregate score
Aggregator	Score
GameRankings	76% (Neo Geo)

Review scores
Publication	Score
Consoles +	92% (Mega Drive)
Computer and Video Games	80% (Mega Drive)
Electronic Gaming Monthly	7.75/10 (Neo Geo); 9/10, 8/10, 8/10, 8/10 (SNES); 7.6/10 (Genesis)
Famitsu	29/40 (PC Engine); 27/40 (Mega Drive)
GameFan	369/400 (Neo Geo)
Nintendo Power	3.5/5 (SNES)
Sinclair User	91% (Neo Geo)
Sega Power	83% (Mega Drive)

=== Commercial performance ===
In Japan, Game Machine listed Fatal Fury 2 as the most successful table arcade unit of January 1993. It went on to be Japan's second highest-grossing arcade game of 1993, just below Street Fighter II: Hyper Fighting. In North America, RePlay reported Fatal Fury 2 to be the fourth most popular arcade game of February 1993, and Play Meter listed it as the thirteenth most popular arcade game of March 1993.

The Super Famicom (Super NES) version topped the Japanese Famitsu sales chart in December 1993.

=== Contemporary reviews ===
Fatal Fury 2 was generally very well-received by Western game critics upon its release. GamePro review of the Neo Geo version praised the "action-packed" gameplay, "Street Fighter-tough" challenge, "great" character graphics and animation, "slick scrolling" backgrounds, and "fantastic" sound, concluding it to be an "awesome sequel" that "ranks up there with the Numero Uno fighting game."

GamePro also praised the Genesis version for its six-button controller support and character graphics. They regarded the music as dull but assessed that the game "faithfully mimics the Neo Geo version and knocks Fatal Fury Genesis out of the ring." Reviewing the Genesis version, Electronic Gaming Monthly (EGM) criticized the sound effects but gave the overall assessment that "all the fighters, all the stages, and extra options not in the arcade (like a speed setting) make this another fine conversion of a Neo Geo title."

Reviewing the SNES version of the game, EGM called it "one of the better fighting games ported to the SNES" and awarded it Game of the Month. GamePro gave the SNES version a more mixed review, comparing it favorably with its predecessor, but stating that the graphics are inferior to the Neo Geo version, the audio is terrible, the controls are unreliable, and the gameplay is unbalanced. The magazine recommended that Fatal Fury fans instead hold out for the upcoming SNES port of Fatal Fury Special, which they felt to be far superior judging by the pre-release version they had seen.

=== Retrospective reviews ===
Retrospective reviews

Review scores
Publication	Score
AllGame	4/5 (Neo Geo)
Maximum	2/5 (Neo Geo)

In a retrospective review, Maximum assessed that while still not as strong as Street Fighter II, Fatal Fury 2 was a dramatic improvement over the first game: "The number of characters selectable had been extended to eight, and all of them received a full complement of moves and fought with a much greater fluidity than in Fatal Fury." They also noted better background graphics and greater interaction with the scenery.

=== Accolades ===
In 2011, Complex ranked Fatal Fury 2 as the 35th best fighting game of all time, largely for introducing Mai Shiranui. In 1994, Mega magazine ranked the Genesis/Mega Drive version number 46 on their list of the "Top 50 Mega Drive Games of All Time". In 1995, Total! ranked the SNES version 82nd on their list of the "Top 100 SNES Games". IGN listed the SNES version 63rd in its list of the "Top 100 SNES Games of All Time".
