= 1996 in animation =

1996 in animation is an overview of notable events, including notable awards, list of films released, television show debuts and endings, and notable deaths.

== Events ==
=== January ===
- January 7: The Simpsons episode "Team Homer" is first broadcast.
- January 14: The Simpsons episode "Two Bad Neighbors" is first broadcast where Homer Simpson and George H. W. Bush collide, as well as the debut of Disco Stu.
- January 19: The first episode of Detective Conan, aka Case Closed, is broadcast.
- January 28: The Powerpuff Girls short "Crime 101" premieres as part of the What a Cartoon! series on Cartoon Network, which marks the debut of The Amoeba Boys. This was the last Powerpuff Girls short to premiere on What a Cartoon! as it would spin-off into a full series 2 years later.

=== February ===
- February 4: The Simpsons episode "Scenes from the Class Struggle in Springfield" is first broadcast, guest starring Tom Kite and having the debut of Brandine Spuckler.
- February 11: The Simpsons episode "Bart the Fink" is first broadcast, guest starring Bob Newhart.
- February 18:
  - The Courage the Cowardly Dog pilot short "The Chicken from Outer Space" premieres as part of the What a Cartoon! series on Cartoon Network; Courage, Muriel Bagge, Eustace Bagge all make their debuts, a series will follow three years later.
  - The Simpsons episode "Lisa the Iconoclast" is first broadcast, guest starring Donald Sutherland.
- February 25: The Simpsons episode "Homer the Smithers" is first broadcast.

=== March ===
- March 9: The final season of Sailor Moon, Sailor Moon Sailor Stars, airs on TV Asahi.
- March 17: The Simpsons episode "The Day the Violence Died" is first broadcast, guest starring Kirk Douglas, Suzanne Somers and Jack Sheldon.
- March 24: The Simpsons episode "A Fish Called Selma" is first broadcast, guest starring Jeff Goldblum.
- March 25: 68th Academy Awards:
  - Nick Park's Wallace and Gromit short film A Close Shave wins the Academy Award for Best Animated Short.
  - Colors of the Wind from Pocahontas by Stephen Schwartz and Alan Menken wins the Academy Award for Best Original Song, while the soundtrack from that same film wins the Academy Award for Best Original Score.
  - Chuck Jones receives an Academy Honorary Award for his entire career.
- March 29: All Dogs Go to Heaven 2, the sequel to Don Bluth’s All Dogs Go to Heaven, premieres. This sequel is set in a different timeline for tragic reasons.
- March 31: The Simpsons episode "Bart on the Road" is first broadcast.

=== April ===
- April 2: The first episode of Dennis and Gnasher is broadcast.
- April 12: Henry Selick releases James and the Giant Peach, based on Roald Dahl's 1961 eponymous novel.
- April 14: The Simpsons episode "22 Short Films About Springfield" premieres on Fox, featuring the famous Steamed Hams scene with Principal Skinner & Superintendent Chalmers.
- April 28:
  - The Simpsons' 150th episode "Raging Abe Simpson and His Grumbling Grandson in 'The Curse of the Flying Hellfish'" premieres on Fox.
  - The first episode of Dexter's Laboratory airs. It became a popular series during the decade.

=== May ===
- May 5: The Simpsons episode "Much Apu About Nothing" premieres on Fox.
- May 18: The Dexter's Laboratory episode "Dial M for Monkey: Barbequor" airs. It was removed shortly after the broadcast allegedly due to the presence of a gay stereotype. It was later revealed that Cartoon Network got sued by Marvel Comics for copyright infringement owing to the use of the Silver Surfer parody.
- May 19: The Simpsons concludes its seventh season on Fox with the following episodes:
  - "Homerpalooza", which guest stars The Smashing Pumpkins, Cypress Hill, Sonic Youth and Peter Frampton.
  - "Summer of 4 Ft. 2" which guest stars Christina Ricci.
    - It is the first time that two new episodes are broadcast on the same day.

=== June ===
- June 21: The Walt Disney Company releases The Hunchback of Notre Dame, directed by Gary Trousdale and Kirk Wise. The film gained much notoriety by parents and Christian groups for its dark tone in a family oriented film during the release. The reviews were positive in spite of its infamy and becomes a cult following afterwards.

=== July ===
- July: The Japanese animation studio Brain's Base is founded.
- July 8: The fourth and final season of Rocko's Modern Life premiered on Nickelodeon.
- July 10: The pilot of Hey Arnold premiered in theatres before Harriet the Spy.
- July 19: The final episode of Tales from the Crypt, "The Third Pig" on HBO, is the series' only animated episode. It is animated by Nelvana and Wang Film Productions.

=== August ===
- August 13:
  - Aladdin and the King of Thieves is released.
  - The first episode of Stickin' Around airs.
- August 23: Chuck Jones' theatrical Looney Tunes short Superior Duck premieres in theaters alongside Carpool. Produced by Warner Bros. Animation & Chuck Jones Enterprises. The cartoon stars the following characters: Daffy Duck, Porky Pig, Marvin the Martian, Foghorn Leghorn, Tweety, Wile E. Coyote & the Road Runner, the Tasmanian Devil and Superman.

=== September ===
- September 3: The first episode of Quack Pack airs.
- September 6: The first episode of Superman: The Animated Series airs.
- September 8: The first episode of Blue's Clues airs.
- September 10: The first episode of Billy the Cat airs.
- September 28: In The Dana Carvey Show a recurring animated segment is introduced, The Ambiguously Gay Duo, which will eventually become a part of Saturday Night Live.

=== October ===
- October 7:
  - The first episodes of Arthur airs. It became one of the longest animated children's programs of all time and became generally acclaimed.
  - The first episodes of Hey Arnold! airs.
- October 19: The final Ren & Stimpy Show episodes "Sammy and Me/The Last Temptation" premiere on MTV after being banned from Nickelodeon the previous year.
- October 22: Discovery Kids launches, the network which is a spin-off of Discovery Channel that primarily offered adventure, nature, and science-themed programs aimed towards a children's audience.
- October 27: Season 8 of The Simpsons begins on Fox with the premiere of the latest Treehouse of Horror installment "Treehouse of Horror VII".

=== November ===
- November 2: The final episode of Teenage Mutant Ninja Turtles is broadcast.
- November 3: The Simpsons episode "You Only Move Twice" is first broadcast, guest starring Albert Brooks.
- November 10: The Simpsons episode "The Homer They Fall" is first broadcast, guest starring Michael Buffer and Paul Winfield.
- November 15: Space Jam, a crossover between basketball icon Michael Jordan and the Looney Tunes characters, is released in theaters, the film is also notable for marking the debut of Lola Bunny.
- November 17: The Simpsons episode "Burns, Baby Burns" is first broadcast, guest starring Rodney Dangerfield.
- November 24:
  - Rocko's Modern Life airs its final episodes on Nickelodeon.
  - The Simpsons episode "Bart After Dark" is first broadcast.

=== December ===
- December 1: The Simpsons episode "A Milhouse Divided" is first broadcast, where Milhouse's parents divorce.
- December 4: After a year-long hiatus, Rugrats returns to Nickelodeon for its fourth season with the premiere of the holiday special "A Rugrats Chanukah".
- December 5: Frank Film is added to the National Film Registry.
- December 10: The first episode of Once Upon a Time... The Explorers airs.
- December 15: The Simpsons episode "Lisa's Date with Density" is first broadcast.
- December 20: The animated feature film Beavis and Butt-head Do America is released. It becomes a cult film.
- December 29: The Simpsons episode "Hurricane Neddy" is first broadcast, guest starring Jon Lovitz.

== Films released ==
- January 5 - City Hunter: The Secret Service (Japan)
- January 20 - Space Armageddon (South Korea)
- February 28 - The Secret of the Hunchback (United States)
- March 2:
  - Doraemon: Nobita and the Galaxy Super-express (Japan)
  - Dragon Ball: The Path to Power (Japan)
- March 19 - Gulliver's Travels (United States)
- March 23 - Pipi: Unforgettable Fireflies (Japan)
- March 29 - All Dogs Go to Heaven 2 (United States)
- April 1 - Cassiopéia (Brazil)
- April 2 - VeggieTales: Dave and the Giant Pickle (United States)
- April 12 - James and the Giant Peach (United States and United Kingdom)
- April 16 - The Hunchback of Notre Dame (United States)
- April 19 - Crayon Shin-chan: Adventure in Henderland (Japan)
- April 20:
  - Dragon Quest Saga: Emblem of Roto (Japan)
  - Lupin III: Dead or Alive (Japan)
  - Tenchi the Movie: Tenchi Muyo in Love (Japan)
- April 30 - The Hunchback of Notre Dame (United States and Japan)
- May 1 - Sanctuary (Japan)
- June 1 - Miki Mol and the Terrible Cloak (Poland)
- June 21 - The Hunchback of Notre Dame (United States)
- June 23 - The Princess Castle (United States)
- June 27 - Werner: Eat My Dust!!! (Germany)
- June 29 - The Nintama Rantarō Movie (Japan)
- July 6 - Jigoku Sensei Nūbē (Japan)
- July 13 - Soreike! Anpanman Soratobu Ehon to Garasu no Kutsu (Japan)
- July 19 - Yawara! Special – I've Always Been About You... (Japan)
- July 24 - Little Dinosaur Dooly (South Korea)
- July 26:
  - Alì Babà (Italy)
  - Odyssey Into the Mind's Eye (United States)
- August 2 - Lupin III: The Secret of Twilight Gemini (Japan)
- August 3:
  - Slayers Return (Japan)
  - X (Japan)
- August 13 - Aladdin and the King of Thieves (United States)
- August 21 - Advancer Tina (Japan)
- August 20 - Maya's Life (Japan)
- August 29 - Pepolino and the Treasure of the Mermaid (Germany, Hungary and Canada)
- August 30 - The Ballad of the Viking King, Holger the Dane (Denmark)
- September 6 - Shinran Shōnin to Ōsha-jō no Higeki (Japan)
- September 17 - Tom Thumb Meets Thumbelina (United States)
- September 25 - Ultraman: Super Fighter Legend – Comet Warrior God Tsuifon Appears (Japan)
- October 1:
  - The Nome Prince and the Magic Belt (United States)
  - Toto, Lost in New York (United States)
  - Virtual Oz (United States)
- October 22 - VeggieTales: The Toy That Saved Christmas (United States)
- November - The Triumph of Time (Greece)
- November 15 - Space Jam (United States)
- November 30 - Black Jack: The Movie (Japan)
- December 5 - How the Toys Saved Christmas (Italy)
- December 7 - The Story of Santa Claus (United States)
- December 10 - The Land Before Time IV: Journey Through the Mists (United States)
- December 14:
  - The File of Young Kindaichi (Japan)
  - Spring and Chaos (Japan)
- December 15 - Christmas in Cartoontown (United States)
- December 20:
  - Beavis and Butt-Head Do America (United States)
  - Hugo: The Movie Star (Denmark, Sweden, Norway and Finland)
- December 24:
  - The Adventures of Toad (United Kingdom)
  - Santa Claus and the Magic Drum (Finland and Hungary)
- Specific date unknown:
  - The 3 Little Pigs: The Movie (Canada)
  - Against the Eagle and the Lion (Cuba and Spain)
  - Beauty and the Beast (Australia)
  - Christmas in Oz (United States)
  - Cinderella (Australia)
  - The Five Suns: A Sacred History of Mexico (United States)
  - Hansel and Gretel (Australia)
  - The Hunchback of Notre Dame (Australia)
  - Kings and Cabbage (Russia)
  - The Snow Queen's Revenge (United Kingdom)
  - Who Stole Santa? (United States)

== Television series debuts ==
Date	Title	Channel	Year
February 3	C Bear and Jamal	Fox Kids	1996–1997
February 24	The Spooktacular New Adventures of Casper	Fox Kids	1996–1998
April 2	Dennis and Gnasher	BBC one	1996–1998
April 16	Amazing Animals	Disney Channel	1996–1999
April 28	Dexter's Laboratory	Cartoon Network	1996–1999, 2001–2003
June 2	Big Bag	Cartoon Network	1996–1998
August 13	Stickin' Around	YTV	1996–1998
August 26	The Real Adventures of Jonny Quest	Cartoon Network	1996–1997
September 2	Adventures from the Book of Virtues	PBS Kids	1996–2000
September 3	Quack Pack	ABC, Syndication	1996
September 6	Dragon Flyz	Syndication	1996–1997
September 6	Mighty Ducks: The Animated Series	ABC, Syndication	1996–1997
September 6	Superman: The Animated Series	Kids' WB	1996–2000
September 7	Road Rovers	Kids' WB	1996–1997
September 7	Captain Simian & the Space Monkeys	Syndication	1996–1997
September 7	Brand Spankin' New! Doug	ABC	1996–1999
September 8	Blue's Clues	Nickelodeon	1996–2006
September 8	Bureau of Alien Detectors	UPN	1996
September 8	The Incredible Hulk (1996)	UPN	1996–1997
September 8	Jumanji	UPN, Syndication	1996–1999
September 9	Pocket Dragon Adventures	Syndication	1996–1997
September 9	Blazing Dragons	Teletoon	1996–1998
September 13	Dragon Ball Z	Syndication, Cartoon Network	1996–2003
September 14	Project G.e.e.K.e.R.	CBS	1996
September 14	Richie Rich (1996)	Syndication	1996
September 16	Beast Wars: Transformers	Fox Kids	1996–1999
September 21	The Mouse and the Monster	UPN	1996–1997
September 21	All Dogs Go to Heaven: The Series	Syndication, Fox Family Channel	1996–1998
September 21	Cave Kids	Syndication	1996
September 21	Mortal Kombat: Defenders of the Realm	USA Network	1996
September 21	Wing Commander Academy	USA Network	1996
September 23	Bruno the Kid	Syndication	1996–1997
October 5	Jungle Cubs	ABC	1996–1998
October 7	Arthur	PBS Kids	1996–2022
October 7	Hey Arnold!	Nickelodeon	1996–2004
October 11	KaBlam!	Nickelodeon	1996–2000
October 19	Waynehead	Kids' WB	1996–1997
November 1	The Tex Avery Show	Cartoon Network	1996–2002
November 3	Inspector Gadget's Field Trip	The History Channel	1996–1998

== Television series endings ==
Date	Title	Channel	Year	Notes
January 5	Highlander: The Animated Series	USA Network, Syndication	1994–1996	Cancelled
January 16	Mega Man (1994)	Syndication	1994–1996	Cancelled
February 3	Dumb and Dumber	ABC	1995–1996	Cancelled
February 8	Klutter!	Fox Kids	1995–1996	Cancelled
February 24	Biker Mice from Mars	Syndication	1993–1996	Cancelled
February 24	Iron Man	Syndication	1994–1996	Cancelled
February 24	Fantastic Four (1994)	Syndication	1994–1996	Cancelled
February 24	Mutant League	Syndication	1994–1996	Cancelled
March 1	The Head	MTV	1994–1996	Cancelled
March 30	Action Man (1995)	Syndication	1995–1996	Cancelled
March 30	Creepy Crawlers	Syndication	1994–1996	Cancelled
May 11	Captain Planet and the Planeteers	TBS	1990–1996	Ended
August 10	The Adventures of Hyperman	CBS	1995–1996	Cancelled
August 17	Santo Bugito	CBS	1995–1996	Cancelled
September 15	Itsy Bitsy Spider	USA Network	1994–1996	Cancelled
November 2	Teenage Mutant Ninja Turtles (1987)	Syndication, CBS	1987–1996	Ended
November 2	The Twisted Tales of Felix the Cat	CBS	1995–1996	Cancelled
November 9	The Oz Kids	ABC	1996	Cancelled
November 9	Cave Kids	Syndication	1996	Cancelled
November 24	The Tick (1994)	Fox Kids	1994–1996	Cancelled
November 24	Adventures of Sonic the Hedgehog	Syndication	1993–1996	Cancelled
November 28	Quack Pack	Syndication	1996	Cancelled
December 1	Bureau of Alien Detectors	UPN	1996	Cancelled
December 7	Project G.e.e.K.e.R.	CBS	1996	Cancelled
December 7	Richie Rich (1996)	Syndication	1996	Cancelled
December 12	Princess Gwenevere and the Jewel Riders	Syndication	1995–1996	Cancelled
December 13	Earthworm Jim	Kids' WB	1995–1996	Cancelled
December 14	Mortal Kombat: Defenders of the Realm	USA Network	1996	Cancelled
December 21	The Savage Dragon	USA Network	1995–1996	Cancelled
December 21	Wing Commander Academy	USA Network	1996	Cancelled
Specific date unknown	Tenko and the Guardians of the Magic	Syndication	1995–1996	Cancelled

== Television season premieres ==
Date	Title	Season	Channel
July 8	Rocko's Modern Life	4	Nickelodeon
September 7	Animaniacs	4	Kids' WB (The WB)
September 7	Doug	5	ABC
September 7	Freakazoid!	2	Kids' WB (The WB)
September 7	Pinky and the Brain	2	Kids' WB (The WB)
September 15	Aaahh!!! Real Monsters	3	Nickelodeon
October 27	The Simpsons	8	Fox
December 4	Rugrats	4	Nickelodeon

== Television season finales ==
Date	Title	Season	Channel
February 17	Freakazoid!	1	Kids' WB (The WB)
February 24	Animaniacs	3	Kids' WB (The WB)
March 7	Beavis and Butt-Head	6	MTV
March 10	Aaahh!!! Real Monsters	2	Nickelodeon
April 21	Rocko's Modern Life	3	Nickelodeon
May 12	Pinky and the Brain	1	Kids' WB (The WB)
May 19	The Simpsons	7	Fox
November 16	Animaniacs	4	Kids' WB (The WB)

== Births ==
=== January ===
- January 3: Florence Pugh, English actress (voice of Goldilocks in Puss in Boots: The Last Wish, Sarah Crumbhorn in Human Resources, Kiriko in The Boy and the Heron, Yelena Boleva in Marvel Zombies).
- January 15: Dove Cameron, American actress and singer (voice of Mal in the Descendants franchise, Gwen Stacy/Spider-Woman in Ultimate Spider-Man and Marvel Rising: Initiation, Ella in The Angry Birds Movie 2, Ellen Wright in Big Nate).
- January 24: Cathy Ang, American actress (voice of Fei Fei in Over the Moon, Golden Glider in the Harley Quinn episode "The 83rd Annual Villy Awards").
- January 26: Tati Gabrielle, American actress (voice of Willow Park in The Owl House, Addie McCallister in The Emoji Movie, Kai Li Cain in Batman: The Doom That Came to Gotham).

=== February ===
- February 9: Jimmy Bennett, American actor (voice of Hathi Jr. in The Jungle Book 2, Rerun Van Pelt in I Want a Dog for Christmas, Charlie Brown and He's a Bully, Charlie Brown, Roo in the Winnie the Pooh franchise, Billy the Lonely Boy in The Polar Express, young Pi in Shark Bait).
- February 22: Michael Johnston, American actor (voice of the title character in Zak Storm, Shoichi in Demon Slayer: Kimetsu no Yaiba, Wasabi Kawamura in Ride Your Wave).
- February 28: Bobb'e J. Thompson, American actor, dancer, rapper and comedian (voice of Shortie #1 in Shark Tale, Cal Deveraux in Cloudy with a Chance of Meatballs, Lamilton Taeshawn in The Boondocks episode "Smokin' With Cigarettes").

=== March ===
- March 31: Liza Koshy, American internet personality and actress (voice of Zipp Storm in My Little Pony: A New Generation, Jinx in The Ghost and Molly McGee, Veronica Hill in Hamster & Gretel, Jade in Big City Greens, herself in the Scooby-Doo and Guess Who? episode "The Internet On Haunted House Hill!", Margot in Ruby Gillman, Teenage Kraken).

=== April ===
- April 3: Sarah Jeffery, Canadian actress, singer, and dancer (voice of Audrey in the Descendants franchise and Chibiverse, Prinzessin, Kiki and Old Woman in the Robot Chicken episode "Boogie Bardstown in: No Need, I Have Coupons", Zoey in Lego Dreamzzz).
- April 14: Abigail Breslin, American actress (voice of Jeana in Quantum Quest: A Cassini Space Odyssey, Priscilla in Rango, Zoe in Zambezia).
- April 16: Anya Taylor-Joy, American actress (voice of Marla Brenner in Playmobil: The Movie, Princess Peach in The Super Mario Bros. Movie).
- April 25: Allisyn Snyder, American actress, writer, artist, and director (voice of Stormy in Jake and the Never Land Pirates).

=== May ===
- May 6: Dominic Scott Kay, American entrepreneur and former actor (voice of Richard in The Little Engine that Could, Wilbur in Charlotte's Web, young Samson in The Wild).
- May 9: Mary Mouser, American actress (voice of Marmalade and Ambrosia in Chowder, Lill in Holly Hobbie and Friends: Christmas Wishes, Eloise in Eloise: The Animated Series, Zoé in Dragon Hunters, young Delgo in Delgo).
- May 14: James Rallison, American internet personality, cartoonist, animator and author (TheOdd1sOut, co-created and voiced himself in Oddballs).
- May 17: Ryan Ochoa, American actor (voice of Tattered Caroler, Beggar Boy, Young Cratchit Boy, Tiny Tim, Ignorance Boy and Young Boy with Sleigh in A Christmas Carol, Rick in Astro Boy, Hatchling in Mars Needs Moms, young Roy Harper in the Batman: The Brave and the Bold episode "Sidekicks Assemble!").

=== June ===
- June 1: Tom Holland, English actor (voice of Walter Beckett in Spies in Disguise, Ian Lightfoot in Onward).
- June 18: Jade Lianna-Peters, Chinese-American actress (voice of Kai-Lan in Ni Hao, Kai-Lan).

=== July ===
- July 11: Alessia Cara, Canadian singer and songwriter (voice of Jane Willoughby in The Willoughbys, Selene in Blade Runner: Black Lotus).
- July 16: Nicky Jones, American former child actor (voice of Flower in Bambi II, the title character in Chowder).
- July 22: Skyler Gisondo, American actor.

=== August ===
- August 1: Cymphonique Miller, American singer and actress (voice of Holly in Phineas and Ferb, Krystal Nova in Winx Club).

=== September ===
- September 1: Zendaya, American actress and singer (voice of Meechee in Smallfoot, Lola Bunny in Space Jam: A New Legacy, Felicia in Shrek 5).
- September 10: Kamil McFadden, American actor (voice of Patriot in Marvel Rising: Secret Warriors and Marvel Rising: Initiation).
- September 12: Colin Ford, American actor (voice of Mikey in Can You Teach My Alligator Manners?, first voice of Jake in Jake and the Never Land Pirates).
- September 17: Ella Purnell, English actress (voice of Gwyn in Star Trek: Prodigy, Jinx in Arcane, Jane in the Invincible, episode "I Thought You Were Stronger").

=== October ===
- October 5: Mary Gibbs, American voice actress (voice of young Kiara in The Lion King II: Simba's Pride, Boo in the Monsters, Inc. franchise, young Riley in Inside Out).
- October 19: Chance Perdomo, American actor (voice of Snork in Moominvalley), (d. 2024).
- October 25: Georgia Lock, English actress and presenter (voice of the title character in Sadie Sparks).

=== November ===
- November 22: Madison Davenport, American actress and singer (voice of Quillo in Over the Hedge, Sophiana in Christmas Is Here Again, Who Girl #2 in Horton Hears a Who!, Stacey in the Special Agent Oso episode "To Grandma with Love", Abel in the Legion of Super Heroes episode "Unnatural Alliances").

=== December ===
- December 6: Stefanie Scott, American actress and singer (voice of Moppet Girl in Wreck-It Ralph, Emma in the Special Agent Oso episode "Live and Let Ride").
- December 8: Teala Dunn, American actress and internet personality (voice of Tuck in Wonder Pets!, Bumblebee in DC Super Hero Girls, Panda-Mania and Random Citizen in the Spider-Man episode "Bring on the Bad Guys: Part One").
- December 9: Leah Lewis, American actress (voice of Max in It's Pony, Cassandra Cain / Batgirl in Batwheels, Ember Lumen in Elemental, Räv in The Tiger's Apprentice).
- December 11
  - Jack Griffo, American actor (voice of Blake Bradley in The Loud House, Robin in Batman and Superman: Battle of the Super Sons).
  - Hailee Steinfeld, American actress and singer (voice of Anna Saski in When Marnie Was There, Gwen Stacy/Spider-Gwen in Spider-Man: Into the Spider-Verse and Spider-Man: Across the Spider-Verse, Vi in Arcane, Billie in Hexed).

== Deaths ==
=== February ===
- February 2:
  - Shamus Culhane, American animator and film producer (J.R. Bray, Fleischer Studios, Ub Iwerks, Walt Disney Company, Warner Bros. Cartoons, Walter Lantz) and film director (The Barber of Seville), dies at age 87.
  - Gene Kelly, American actor, singer, dancer, film director, producer and choreographer (danced with Jerry Mouse in Anchors Aweigh, choreography consultant for Cats Don't Dance), dies at age 83.
- February 3: Audrey Meadows, American actress (voice of Bea Simmons in The Simpsons episode "Old Money"), dies at age 73.
- February 13: Scott Beach, American actor (voice roles in Peanuts productions, original voice of Garfield), dies at age 65.

=== March ===
- March 6:
  - Simon Cadell, English actor (voice of Blackberry in Watership Down), dies at age 45.
  - Paula Winslowe, American actress (voice of Bambi's mother in Bambi), dies at age 85.
- March 11: Vince Edwards, American actor and director (voice of Jake Rockwell in Centurions), dies at age 67.
- March 15: Homer Groening, Canadian-American filmmaker and father of Matt Groening (namesake for Homer Simpson, produced and directed "A Study in Wet" which was used as the logo for The Curiosity Company), dies at age 76.

=== April ===
- April 14: Mary Oosterdijk, Dutch animator and comics artist (worked for Marten Toonder's animation studio), dies at age 82.
- April 17: Constantin Mustatea, American animator (Hanna-Barbera, Filmation, The Simpsons, Widget the World Watcher, Warner Bros. Animation), dies at age 68.
- April 25: Saul Bass, American graphic designer (swirling star logo for Hanna-Barbera), and filmmaker (Why Man Creates), dies at age 75.

=== May ===
- May 8: Ed Love, American animator (Walt Disney Company, MGM (worked in Tex Avery's unit), Walter Lantz, Hanna-Barbera), dies at age 85.
- May 9: Carl Fallberg, American writer and cartoonist (Walt Disney Animation Studios, Hanna-Barbera, Warner Bros Cartoons), dies at age 80.
- May 10: Ethel Smith, American organist (played organ during the "Blame It on the Samba" segment in Melody Time), dies at age 93.
- May 15: Virgil Walter Ross, American animator (Charles B. Mintz, Ub Iwerks, Walter Lantz, Warner Bros. Cartoons, Filmation, Hanna Barbera), dies at age 88.
- May 24: John Abbott, English actor (voice of Akela in The Jungle Book), dies at age 90.

=== June ===
- June 5: Vito Scotti, American actor (voice of Peppo in The Aristocats), dies at age 78.
- June 11: Gin, Spanish comics artist, animator and illustrator (Macian Studios), dies at age 65.

=== July ===
- July 13: Tom Coppola, American layout artist (Hanna-Barbera, Filmation, The Simpsons, Tiny Toon Adventures, Taz-Mania), dies at age 50.
- July 15: Dana Hill, American voice actress (voice of Scrappy in Mighty Mouse: The New Adventures, Buddy in Adventures of the Gummi Bears, Tank Muddlefoot in Darkwing Duck, Max in Goof Troop, Jerry in Tom and Jerry: The Movie, Charles Duckman in Duckman), dies from a stroke at age 32.
- July 23: Jim Pabian, American animator, screenwriter, and director (Leon Schlesinger Productions, Harman & Ising, Metro-Goldwyn-Mayer cartoon studio), dies at age 87.
- July 29: Sean Roberge, Canadian actor (voice of Chester McTech in Beverly Hills Teens, Tuxedo Sam in Hello Kitty's Furry Tale Theater, additional voices in Babar), dies in a car accident at age 23.

=== August ===
- August 18: Al Bertino, American animator (Charles Mintz, Walt Disney Company, UPA, Grantray-Lawrence Animation, Walter Lantz), dies at age 84.

=== September ===
- September 4: Victor Aaron, American actor (original voice of John Redcorn in King of the Hill), dies in a car accident at age 39.
- September 6: Gordon A. Sheehan, American animator and cartoonist (Fleischer Studios), dies at age 86.
- September 23: Hiroshi Fujimoto, Japanese manga artist (Doraemon, Ninja Hattori-kun, Perman, Obake no Q-Tarō), dies at age 62.

=== October ===
- October 8: Morey Amsterdam, American actor, comedian, writer and producer (voice of narrator in Gay Purr-ee, Brady and James in Mister Magoo's Christmas Carol, One Million (O.M) in Rudolph's Shiny New Year), dies at age 87.

=== November ===
- November 23: George Nicholas, American animator (Walter Lantz, Walt Disney Company, Hanna-Barbera), dies at age 85.
- November 30: Tiny Tim, American singer, ukulele player and musical archivist (performed the song "Livin' in the Sunlight, Lovin' in the Moonlight" which was used in the SpongeBob SquarePants episode "Help Wanted"), dies from cardiac arrest at age 64.

=== December ===
- December 8: Stig Lasseby, Swedish animator, director, animation producer (Agaton Sax, Peter-No-Tail) and voice actor (Tänkande August in the Agaton Sax films and TV series), dies at age 71.

=== Specific date unknown ===
- Jim Davis, American animator and cartoonist (Walt Disney Company, Fleischer Studios, Warner Bros. Cartoons, DePatie-Freleng, worked on Fritz the Cat), dies at age 80 or 81.
- Rick Hoover, American animator (Walt Disney Company, Hanna-Barbera, Filmation) and comics artist, dies at age 55 or 56.
- Cor Icke, Dutch animator (directed Loeki de Leeuw), dies at age 82 or 83.

== See also ==
- 1996 in anime
