= Steve Cuden =

American writer

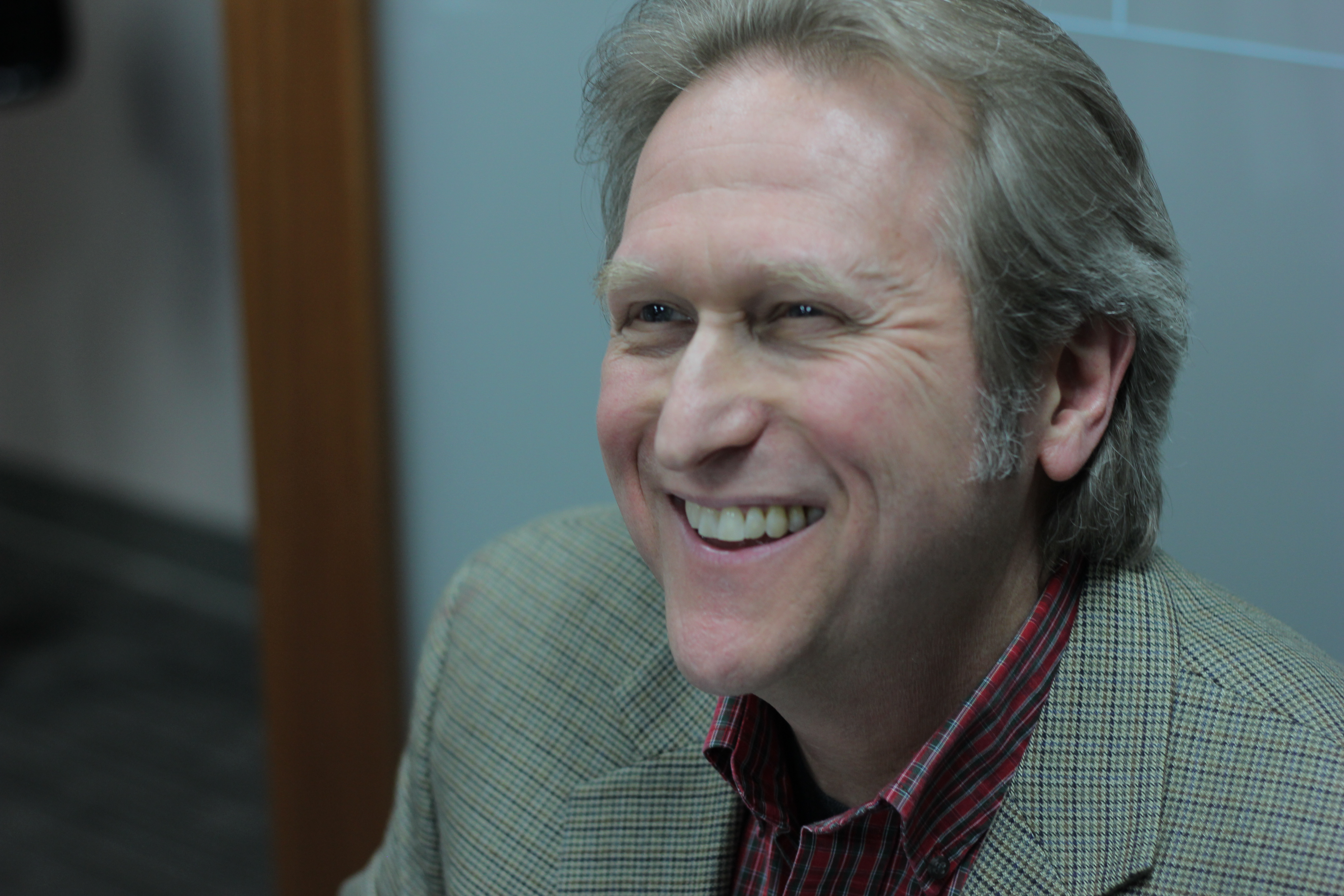
- Born: Steven D. Cuden; September 25, 1955 (age 70); Pittsburgh, Pennsylvania
- Education: Taylor Allderdice High School, Pittsburgh, PA, 1973; USC, 1978, B.A. Theater; UCLA, Professional Program in Screenwriting, Certificate, 2007-2008; UCLA, 2010, M.F.A., Screenwriting
- Occupations: Screenwriter, Director, Producer, Librettist/Lyricist, Playwright, Author, Theater Lighting Designer, Artist, Teacher
- Years active: 1978-present

Steve Cuden (born September 25, 1955) is an American screenwriter, director, lyricist, playwright, author, theater lighting designer, artist, and teacher. He is best known for his work on the Broadway musical, Jekyll & Hyde, as well as his writing for numerous television series.

== Biography ==
Steve Cuden was born in Pittsburgh, Pennsylvania. The eldest son of Dr. Charles L. Cuden and Helen M. Cuden, he graduated from Taylor Allderdice High School in 1973. Cuden attended the University of Wisconsin-Madison from 1973–1976 and the University of Southern California from 1976–1978, from where he graduated with a B.A. in Theater. Upon graduation from USC, he became the USC School of Theater's Master Electrician. Cuden was married to Lisa Ann Kranz from 1993–1996, but the marriage ended in divorce. Cuden received an MFA in Screenwriting from UCLA's School of Theater, Film, and Television in 2010. He began teaching Screenwriting at Point Park University in Pittsburgh, Pennsylvania, in 2011.

== Career ==
It was while Cuden was working as the Master Electrician at USC's School of Theatre on a musical called Christopher, written by composer Frank Wildhorn, that the two met, struck up a friendship, and began to collaborate on writing musicals. Their first effort was a song cycle based on the life of Julius Caesar called The High and Mighty Caesar. They also collaborated on a musical based on the lives of Nicholas and Alexandra called The Last Tsar. In 1980, Cuden and Wildhorn wrote the first of two versions that they would create of a musical based on Robert Louis Stevenson's classic story, The Strange Case of Dr. Jekyll and Mr. Hyde. The second version that they wrote, which Cuden then titled, Jekyll & Hyde, was completed in 1986. The musical was nearly produced on Broadway in 1988, with Terrence Mann set to star, but the production never came to fruition due to the financial backers withdrawing funding prior to rehearsals. Leslie Bricusse replaced Cuden in 1988 as the musical's librettist. Cuden still retains both co-conceptual and co-lyrics credits on the show. Jekyll & Hyde ran on Broadway at the Plymouth Theatre from April 1997 through January 2001 for a total of 1543 performances. Its first revival on Broadway opened in April 2013, and closed after thirty performances.

Cuden and Wildhorn also co-conceived a musical based on the story of Rudolf, the last Crown Prince of the Austro-Hungarian Empire, and his death at his hunting lodge, Mayerling. Originally called Vienna, the musical was not completed prior to Cuden and Wildhorn parting ways. Wildhorn later revived the idea, first with Nan Knighton, and later with Jack Murphy. They retitled it, Rudolf: Affaire Mayerling, and later Rudolf: The Last Kiss. The musical has been produced in Hungary, Austria, Japan, and Korea. Cuden still retains co-conceptual credits and co-lyrics credits.

Cuden is well known for writing episodes of television animation for popular shows as: The Batman, X-Men, Iron Man, Loonatics Unleashed, Xiaolin Showdown, Goof Troop, The Mask, Bonkers, Quack Pack, Gargoyles, Beetlejuice, The Pink Panther, Savage Dragon, RoboCop, Stargate Infinity, Exosquad, Skeleton Warriors, and Mummies Alive.

Cuden is also known for directing Lucky, an independently produced, multiple award-winning horror-comedy feature that was released by MTI Home Video in 2004.

In the 1980s, Cuden won numerous awards for designing lighting of stage productions in Los Angeles, including 3 Plays of Love and Hate, for director John Cassavetes, Playing for Time, for director Mimi Leder, Piece de Resistance, for director Abraham Polonsky, and Dinner and Drinks, for director Monte Markham. Cuden was Supervisor of Ride and Show Lighting at Universal Studios Florida from 1989-1990.

In 2013, Cuden published a book titled, Beating Broadway: How to Create Stories for Musicals That Get Standing Ovations.

In 2015, as a companion book to Beating Broadway, Cuden published, Beating Hollywood: Tips for Creating Unforgettable Screenplays.

In 2017, Cuden launched a new podcast, StoryBeat with Steve Cuden, which he produces and hosts. Shows focus on in-depth interviews with artists from all disciplines regarding their creative process.

== Works ==
=== Podcasts ===
- StoryBeat with Steve Cuden

=== Books ===
- Beating Hollywood: Tips for Creating Unforgettable Screenplays, 2015, Cudwerks Productions
- Beating Broadway: How to Create Stories for Musicals That Get Standing Ovations, 2013, Cudwerks Productions

=== Musicals ===
- Jekyll & Hyde, The Musical, Co-Conceived for the Stage, and Co-Lyrics
  - Tours: U.S., 1995–1996, 1999–2000, 2001–2002, 2012–2013
  - Broadway: The Plymouth Theatre, 1997–2001, The Marquis Theatre, 2013
  - Translated into more than twenty languages and produced in multiple venues around the world
- Rudolf: Affaire Mayerling, Co-Conceived for the Stage, and Co-Lyrics
  - Productions in Hungary, Vienna, Japan, and Korea

=== Feature films ===
- Lucky, Muddfilms/MTI Home Video, released 2004, director/co-producer

=== Television – Staff Writer – Animation ===
- Bonkers (1993–1994): Synd/Disney TV Animation
- Goof Troop (1992): Synd/Disney TV Animation
- Quack Pack (1996): Synd/Disney TV Animation

=== Television – Writer – Animation ===
- Little Shop (1991): Fox/Saban Entertainment
- Beetlejuice (1991): Fox/Nelvana
- Goof Troop (1992): ABC/Walt Disney Television Animation
- Bonkers (1993–1994): Syndicated/Walt Disney Television Animation
- Exosquad (1994): Syndicated/Universal Cartoon Studios
- Skeleton Warriors (1994): CBS/Graz Entertainment
- Creepy Crawlers (1994–1995): Syndicated/Saban Entertainment
- X-Men (1995): Fox/Graz Entertainment
- Iron Man (1995): Syndicated/Rainbow Animation Korea
- The Pink Panther (1995): Syndicated/Wang Film Productions
- G.I. Joe Extreme (1995): USA/Gunther-Wahl Animation
- The Savage Dragon (1995–1996): USA/Universal Cartoon Studios
- Street Fighter (1996): USA/USA Studios
- Quack Pack (1996): Syndicated/Walt Disney Television Animation
- Wing Commander Academy (1996): USA/Universal Cartoon Studios
- Gargoyles (1996): ABC/Walt Disney Television Animation
- The Mask: Animated Series (1996–1997): Syndicated/Sunbow Entertainment
- Extreme Ghostbusters (1997): Syndicated/Columbia-TriStar
- Mummies Alive! (1997): Syndicated/DIC Entertainment
- Pocket Dragon Adventures (1998), Syndicated/BKN Entertainment
- RoboCop: Alpha Commando (1998–1999): Syndicated/MGM Animation
- Sonic Underground (1999): Syndicated/DIC Productions
- Shadow Raiders (1999): Syndicated/Mainframe Entertainment
- Roughnecks: The Starship Troopers Chronicles (1999-2000): Syndicated/Columbia-TriStar
- Godzilla: The Series (2000): Fox/Columbia-TriStar
- NASCAR Racers (2000–2001): Fox/Saerom Animation
- Stargate Infinity (2002–2003): Fox/DIC Entertainment
- Xiaolin Showdown (2004–2006): WB/Warner Bros. Animation
- Biker Mice from Mars (2006–2007): Syndicated/Brentwood TV Funnies
- Loonatics Unleashed (2006–2007): WB/Warner Bros. Animation
- The Batman (2007), WB/Warner Bros. Animation
- World of Quest (2008): WB/Cookie Jar Entertainment
- Xiaolin Chronicles (2014): Disney XD/Genao Productions

=== Teaching ===
- Point Park University, Assistant Professor, Screenwriting, 2011–2020

== Awards ==
=== Feature films ===
Lucky (Director/Co-Producer)

- Winner – Best Director – Nodance Film Festival, 2002
- Winner – Best Feature – New York City Horror Film Festival, 2002
- Winner – Best Feature – MicroCineFest, Baltimore, 2002
- Winner – Best Feature – Shriekfest Film Festival, Los Angeles, 2003
- Winner – Fan Favorite – Shriekfest Film Festival, Los Angeles, 2003
- Winner – Best Feature – Weekend of Fear, Nuremberg, Germany, 2003

=== Lighting design ===
Dramalogue Drama Critics Awards

- In Trousers, 1984
- Strider, 1983
- Love Streams, 1981

L.A. Weekly LAWEE Awards

- In Trousers, 1984
- Livin' Dolls, 1984
- 3 Plays of Love and Hate: Knives, Love Streams, The Third Day Comes, 1981

L.A. Drama Critics Circle Awards

- In Trousers – Nomination, 1984

== Memberships ==
- Writers Guild of America, West
- Writers Guild of Canada
- Dramatists Guild
- Animation Guild
- ASCAP

== Boards of directors ==
- Pittsburgh Irish and Classical Theatre (PICT), 2012–2017
- The Denis Theatre Foundation, 2011–2017
- Academy for New Musical Theatre, Los Angeles, 2008-2011
- Front Porch Theatricals, Pittsburgh, PA, 2019–present
