= Rick Crom =

American actor

- Born: March 15, 1957 (age 69)
- Occupations: Actor; singer; composer; lyricist; comedian

Rick Crom (born March 15, 1957) is an American actor, singer, comedian, lyricist, and composer. He has appeared in numerous television shows and specials, Broadway and off-Broadway musicals, as well as written several off-Broadway revues, and has been nominated 3 times for the Drama Desk Award for Outstanding Lyrics.

== Performer ==
In 1993, Crom made his Broadway acting debut in The Goodbye Girl. He was an understudy in Footloose and appeared in Urinetown: The Musical as Tiny Tom/Dr. Billeaux. His off-Broadway acting credits include the 1994 revival of Merrily We Roll Along and the Encores! productions of Fiorello! and Li'l Abner.

== Stand-up Comedy ==
As a comedian, Crom has appeared with the Chicago City Limits, and performed stand-up across the country, most frequently at New York City's Comedy Cellar. On television, he has been seen on Chappelle's Show, Caroline's Comedy Hour, and Tough Crowd with Colin Quinn. He also appeared on the FX sitcom Louie, starring fellow comic Louis CK, in which he schools CK on the use of a gay slur.

Crom teaches a course in stand-up comedy at the Comedy Cellar in New York.

In 2017, the documentary Oh, Rick was released, chronicling his career. It was directed by Dustin Sussman and Aaron Rosenbloom.

== Writer ==
In 2004, Crom wrote the book, music, and lyrics for Newsical, and received his first Drama Desk nomination for Outstanding Lyrics, with NEWSical picking up a nomination for Outstanding Revue. An original cast recording was released on April 5, 2005. Though NEWSical closed in 2005 after 215 performances, a new edition (renamed NEWSICAL the Musical: We Distort, You Decide, and featuring an original book and music) began previews at the 47th Street Theater on November 24, 2009, and opened December 9 of that year. Once again, Crom was nominated for the Drama Desk Award for Outstanding Lyrics, and the show was nominated for the Outstanding Musical Revue award. The 2009–2010 production closed March 21, 2010. The latest edition of NEWSical the Musical: Full Spin Ahead began previews December 13 of that year and opened on January 9, 2011, at The Kirk at Theatre Row.

Crom created the Star Trek spoof Space Trek with bookwriter Marc Lipitz, and authored the topical musical revues Oh Fine RSVP!, The Subject Was Neurosis, Absolutely Rude, and Our Life and Times, which won him a MAC Award and a Backstage Bistro Award for Outstanding Musical Revue.

Crom contributed a majority of the topical material featured at the Crystal Palace Theater in Aspen, Colorado, from the late 1980s to 2008 (when the venue closed). A recording of his songs for the Crystal Palace, Who Writes This Stuff? The Songs of Rick Crom, was released in 2008. He currently performs the same function for Laffing Matterz, a dinner theater in Fort Lauderdale, Florida.

In 2009, Crom composed the score and co-wrote lyrics with Fred M. Caruso for the film The Big Gay Musical. He composed the score and wrote the lyrics for Bonnie & Clyde: A Folktale, with a book by his Urinetown co-star Hunter Foster. It was presented at the 2009 New York Musical Theatre Festival, where it won awards for Best Music and Most Promising Musical. Bonnie & Clyde: A Folktale was workshopped in residency at the Academy for New Musical Theatre, through the ASCAP Foundation Irving Caesar Fund Fellowship, a Producer-Writer Initiative granted through NAMT, the National Alliance for Musical Theatre.
