= Street Fighter (TV series) =

Animated television series (1995–1997)

- The franchise logo, which in this series was added with "The Animated Series" underneath.
- Genre: Action-adventure; Science fantasy
- Created by: Capcom
- Based on: Street Fighter II by Capcom
- Developed by: Julia Lewald (season 1); Eric Lewald (season 1); Michael Edens (season 1); Roger Slifer (season 2)
- Voices of: Michael Donovan; Donna Yamamoto; Scott McNeil; Richard Newman; Tong Lung; John Payne; Paul Dobson; Kathleen Barr; Lisa Ann Beley
- Narrated by: John Payne; Dennis Falt
- Composer: Andrew Dimitroff
- Countries of origin: United States; Japan; Canada
- Original language: English
- No. of seasons: 2
- No. of episodes: 26

Production
- Executive producers: Jun Aida; Daniel S. Keltzky; Jim Graziano; Stephanie Graziano
- Producers: Michael Hack; Billy CC Yang; Kenzo Tsujimoto; Masao Maruyama; Tatsuhiko Urahata; Yasuaki Iwase
- Running time: 22 minutes
- Production companies: Capcom; Graz Entertainment (season 1); InVision Entertainment (season 2); Madhouse Studios; USA Studios

Original release
- Network: USA Network
- Release: October 21, 1995 – May 14, 1997

Street Fighter is an American-Japanese animated television series based on the Street Fighter video game franchise by Capcom. The series aired as part of the USA Network's Cartoon Express and Action Extreme Team lineups. The show is closely based on the Street Fighter II series, but also borrows plot elements and characters from the live-action Street Fighter film and the first two Street Fighter Alpha games. It also features elements from other Capcom games, such as Saturday Night Slam Masters and Final Fight. Capcom producer Yoshiki Okamoto served as a consultant on the show.

It aired 26 episodes across two 13-episode seasons, which aired from 1995 to 1997. The show has received overwhelmingly negative reviews from critics and fans, with many listing it as the worst addition to the franchise.

== Plot ==
"Colonel William Guile, one of the greatest martial artists in the world, travels the global tournament circuit, using it to conceal his top secret mission as leader of an elite group of international crime fighters, known only by their code name: Street Fighter! The heroic man-beast, Blanka! Hard-kicking fighting machine, Chun-Li! and the team of the most amazing warriors ever seen have joined forces with Guile to combat the criminal empire of Shadaloo and its superhuman leader, Bison. They have their own code of honor: discipline, justice, commitment. And together, they will triumph against the forces of evil. Street Fighter!"

— opening narration.

Colonel William F. Guile is the leader of the "Street Fighters", an international undercover peacekeeping force composed of martial artists from around the world. They often face off against the ruthless General Bison and his Shadaloo criminal empire. They follow a code of honor involving the keywords "discipline", "justice" and "commitment".

== Characters ==
From left to right: Chun-Li, Ken, Guile, Blanka, Ryu, and Cammy White

Colonel William F. Guile

Voiced by: Michael Donovan
The main protagonist of the series and the leader of the "Street Fighters", a peacekeeping force composed of several main characters from the games. He retains his rank and full name from the movie, where he is known as Colonel William F. Guile. Unlike in the games, Guile is single and has no children. He has an on-and-off relationship with an ex-girlfriend named Lucinda, who is a character created for the series, and also has a mutual attraction with Cammy.

General M. Bison

Voiced by: Richard Newman
Like in the games, M. Bison is the ruthless and megalomaniacal ruler of Shadaloo. He serves as the main antagonist of the series.

Chun-Li Zang

Voiced by: Donna Yamamoto
The lead female character of the series. Like in the games, she seeks to avenge her father, who was killed by M. Bison. Like in the movie, she works as a news reporter. In the series, her surname is "Zang".

Carlos "Charlie" Blanka

Voiced by: Scott McNeil
Like in the film, Blanka is Guile's combat buddy Charlie, who was turned into a mutant by Dr. Dhalsim. He temporarily reverts to his original human form in "Eye of the Beholder", where he wears an outfit similar to the one Charlie wears in the Street Fighter Alpha games, but with a green vest; he also still wears shackles.

Ken Masters

Voiced by: Scott McNeil
Like in the games, Ken has a rivalry with Ryu. However, he is depicted as a traveling con-man who prefers to find ways to get rich rather than helping Guile and his team. He becomes a more prominent character during the second season and is the only character to defeat Akuma in "The World's Greatest Warrior".

Ryu Hoshi

Voiced by: Tong Lung
Ken's traveling partner and rival, who retains his rivalry with Sagat from the games. He is depicted as the more mature and responsible one of the duo. Like Ken, he becomes more prominent during the second season. In the series, his surname is "Hoshi", and he has a cousin named Sachi who appears in "The Hand That Feeds You", though he has no relatives in the games.

Cammy White

Voiced by: Lisa Ann Beley
Cammy is depicted as a member of Delta Red who harbors a mutual attraction with Guile. In "Chunnel Vision", she leaves Delta Red to become a member of Guile's team. However, she is brainwashed by M. Bison in "Cammy and the Bachelor", and throughout the rest of the series is one of his agents until her brainwashing wears off in the final episode, "Cammy Tell Me True".

Edmond Honda

Voiced by: Paul Dobson
E. Honda is depicted as a computer whiz who loves hacking into government files.

Dee Jay

Voiced by: Paul Dobson
Unlike in the film, Dee Jay is one of the heroes, and serves as the team's helicopter pilot.

Thunder Hawk

Voiced by: Paul Dobson
T. Hawk is a powerful flying Native American warrior.

Fei Long

Voiced by: Paul Dobson
Fei Long is a martial arts movie actor who is allied with the Street Fighters.

Dhalsim

Voiced by: Garry Chalk
Dhalsim is depicted as a former scientist who retreated to the Himalayan mountains and shunned technology after M. Bison forced him to experiment on Blanka, causing him to become a mutant.

Zangief

Voiced by: Michael Donovan
Zangief is depicted as one of M. Bison's recurring lackeys in the series, despite not working for him in the games. He had a similar role in the live-action film as well as in Street Fighter II V.

Viktor Sagat

Voiced by: Robert O. Smith (Season 1), John Payne (Season 2)
The second-in-command of Shadaloo who later turns against M. Bison during the final episode, "Cammy Tell Me True" after the latter announces his plan to unleash a nuclear holocaust upon the world.

Vega

Voiced by: Paul Dobson
He appears in "Eye of the Beholder" and "Face of Fury" as Blanka's rival.

Balrog

Voiced by: Paul Dobson
He appears in "The Medium is the Message", where he is a computer specialist working for M. Bison.

Akuma

Voiced by: Dale Wilson (Season 1); David Kaye (Season 2)
The evil brother of Ryu and Ken's master, Gouken. He forces M. Bison and Guile to fight against him in "Strange Bedfellows", and later fights against Ryu and Ken in "The World's Greatest Warrior".

Rose

Voiced by: Teryl Rothery
Like the other Alpha characters, she has a non-speaking cameo in "The Medium is the Message". She plays a major role in "The Flame and The Rose", as a mystical psychic who enlists the help of Ken and Blanka.

Sakura Kasugano

Voiced by: Saffron Henderson
She appears in "Second to None" as a young Japanese girl who got into martial arts after witnessing Ryu's fight against Sagat.

Birdie

Voiced by: Paul Dobson
A henchman of M. Bison who is beaten in a fight against Chun-Li in "The Medium is the Message". He reappears in "Cammy and the Bachelor", where he works alongside Sodom.

Adon

He appears briefly in "The Medium is the Message".

Guy

Voiced by: Jim Byrnes
Guy makes a non-speaking cameo as Blanka's opponent in "The Medium is the Message". He plays a major role in "Final Fight", where Ryu and Ken assist him and Cody in rescuing Jessica from the Mad Gear Gang.

Cody

Voiced by: Michael Dobson
Cody appears in the episode "Final Fight", though he, Jessica, and other Final Fight characters had previously made cameo appearances in the tournament audience in "The Medium is the Message". As the episode in which he has a starring role is based on the events that took place before Street Fighter Alpha 3, Cody is shown to be in a healthy relationship with Jessica, and wears his civilian outfit from Final Fight.

Jessica Haggar

Voiced by: Willow Johnson
Cody's girlfriend and Haggar's daughter. In the episode "Final Fight", the Mad Gear Gang's soldier-unit kidnap her and Belger holds her for ransom.

Mike Haggar

Voiced by: Don Brown
The mayor of Metro City, who appears in the episode "Final Fight".

Belger

Voiced by: Don Brown
The main antagonist of the episode "Final Fight". He is the leader of the Mad Gear Gang.

Rolento F. Schugurg

Voiced by: Scott McNeil
Belger's right-hand man and second-in-command of the Mad Gear Gang who appears in "Final Fight". He is depicted as being Italian-American, but is German-American in the games.

Thrasher

Voiced by: Michael Dobson
A member of the Mad Gear Gang who assists Rolento in kidnapping Jessica at the start of "Final Fight". He was originally known as "Damnd" in the games.

Sodom

Voiced by: Blu Mankuma in "Cammy and the Bachelor" and John Payne in "Final Fight"

One of M. Bison's lackeys and a member of the Mad Gear Gang; he appears in "The Medium is the Message", "Cammy and the Bachelor", and "Final Fight". Unlike the games, he fights without samurai weapons.

Colonel Sawada

Voiced by: Michael Dobson
He appears in "Keeping the Peace" and "The Hammer Strikes" as Guile's replacement in the A.N.

Lucinda Davila

Voiced by: Kathleen Barr
An expert medical scientist and Guile's ex-girlfriend.

Escher

Voiced by: John Payne
The head employer and liaison officer of the Street Fighters, who usually contacts Guile and his team to give them their missions.

Gouken

Voiced by: Michael Donovan
The master of Ryu and Ken. Akuma steals his chi in "The World's Greatest Warrior", but he regains it after Ken's victory over Akuma.

Burke

Voiced by: Garry Chalk
The leader and field commander of Delta Red, who has a notable scar over his left eye. He was originally known as Keith Wolfman in the games.

Rory

Voiced by: Scott McNeil
A robust member of Delta Red, who has a cybernetic right eye and cybernetic arms. He was originally known as Matthew McCoy in the games.

Celia

Voiced by: Janyse Jaud
A member of Delta Red, who has a strong rivalry with Cammy. She was originally known as Lita Luwanda in the games.

== Episodes ==
=== Season 1 (1995–96) ===
No.	Title	Written by	Original release date	Prod. code
1	"The Adventure Begins"	Michael Edens, Julia Lewald, Eric Lewald	October 21, 1995	101
While working undercover for the Street Fighter operation, Guile gets contacted by Escher. Bison has just stolen a biological virus from Guile's old flame, Lucinda (or "Cindy"), that can kill an infected person within 24 hours of instant contact. Guile assembles a team consisting of Chun-Li, Ryu, Ken and Blanka and heads into the jungle to put an end to Bison's scheme. Unfortunately, both Ryu and Blanka come into contact with the virus and the group faces a race against time in order to get the antidote needed to save their friends.
2	"The Strongest Woman in the World"	Richard Stanley	October 28, 1995	102
Bison takes control of a nuclear power plant in China, which is coincidentally situated near Chun-Li's own birthplace which Bison had destroyed years prior. Guile assembles Blanka and Chun-Li for the mission to stop Bison. However, Chun-Li is only focused on getting her revenge against Bison and doesn't care if the power plant gets destroyed. Eventually, Guile's scolding gets through to her and she lets Bison escape so that innocent people won't get harmed.
3	"Getting to Guile"	Mark Onspaugh	November 4, 1995	103
Dee Jay relays to Escher and Chun-Li that he and Guile were ambushed by Bison and Zangief and that Guile was captured. Bison hooks Guile into a mind-probing device to find his Achilles heel so that he can brainwash and reprogram Guile into destroying the rest of the Street Fighters. Chun-Li rallies Blanka, Dee Jay, Ryu and Ken to help rescue Guile and infiltrate Bison's stronghold. After battling many of Bison's mutant soldiers, the team saves Guile and reminds him of the Street Fighter code: Discipline, justice, and commitment.
4	"No Way Out"	Bruce Reid Schaefer	November 11, 1995	104
Sagat uses his vast army to wage war on a U.S. embassy in Shadaloo, and a young boy named Kip is trapped in the building while it's being evacuated. Blanka, Chun-Li and Guile head the rescue operation, but Guile gets trapped inside the building along with Kip. Both Guile and Kip try to escape Sagat's patrolling forces and gain access to some secret computer files, which are very important.
5	"Demon Island"	Francis Moss, Ted Pedersen	November 18, 1995	105
Bison steals a top secret military plane that can turn invisible at the push of a button, so it's up to Guile, Dee Jay, Cammy and Blanka to get it back. They arrive on a mysterious island where Bison currently has set up shop and unfortunately, Zangief is patrolling the area in a hovercraft. Dee Jay blames Zangief for ruining his fighting career, and they begin to fight while Guile fends off Bison. The Street Fighters eventually steal the plane back just as the island explodes.
6	"Desert Thunder"	Jeremy Cushner	December 2, 1995	106
Escher receives word that a new military laser has been stolen by the female cyborg, Satin Hammer, and her cohort, T. Hawk. While T. Hawk was originally supposed to be undercover in order to monitor Satin Hammer's activities, Escher fears that T. Hawk has gone rogue. He tasks Guile and Blanka with getting to the bottom of the situation. They eventually confront T. Hawk, who still maintains that he's on their side, even though it's clear he's sympathetic towards Satin Hammer's cause. Eventually however, T. Hawk throws himself into Satin Hammer's computer system and destroys it in an instant, though Satin Hammer manages to escape capture from him and the others.
7	"Dark Heart"	Matt Edens	December 9, 1995	107
The Millennial Comet is on its scheduled 1000-year voyage in the skies over Earth, but Bison uses his magnetic chi powers to redirect the comet towards the planet and threatens to rip apart North America through the comet's impact unless he gets a huge sum of money. Guile, Blanka, Ryu and Ken go to the Himalayas to stop Bison, but the group gets separated by an avalanche. Blanka meets with Dhalsim while in the mountains and blames him for his monstrous appearance. With Dhalsim's help, Guile and Blanka manage to stop Bison's plan while saving Ryu and Ken in the process.
8	"The Medium is the Message"	Matthew Malach	December 16, 1995	108
A Street Fighter tournament is being held in India and Escher sends Guile and the rest of the Street Fighters to compete in order to flush out any Shadaloo agents who might be participating. Bison is attending as well, and has a double threat of a plan; use his new mutant combatants to destroy the Street Fighters, and have Balrog create a fake video of the Street Fighters defiling a sacred Hindu temple. Both of Bison's plans fail when Guile saves a captured scientist and performs a Flash Kick on a time bomb.
9	"Eye of the Beholder"	Doug Booth	December 30, 1995	109
Word comes in that a scientist in Hawaii is concocting a serum that could help Blanka revert to his human form. Vega also hears of this serum and wants to use it to make himself eternally young. Vega captures the scientist and holds him for ransom. Blanka is forced to give Vega the cure in exchange for the doctor's life, but Vega drops the vial of serum in the ensuing chaos, losing his chance at immortality.
10	"The Hand That Feeds You"	Steve Cuden	January 6, 1996	110
Ryu's cousin, Sachi, goes missing in Hong Kong while the Street Fighters are investigating a local drug operation. Action star Fei Long says he'll show Guile the secrets of the city if Guile teaches him how to use Chi energy attacks. Eventually, Ryu and Ken get captured by the drug runners and it's up to Guile and Fei Long to save them.
11	"Keeping the Peace"	Matt Edens	January 20, 1996	111
A small city near Shadaloo is in chaos as rare diamonds have been found to be rich in the region. Sagat and many other warlords are lurking about as each faction wants a piece of the pie. Guile is asked by Escher to check out the situation on behalf of the Street Fighters. Meanwhile, Sawada has taken over Guile's former position in the Allied Nations (AN) and is currently in charge of the military presence. Hostilities run high as Guile manages to defuse several bombs in the area with the help of his Sonic Boom attack.
12	"Chunnel Vision"	Len Wein	January 27, 1996	112
Bison finally gets captured by Cammy's former British teammates, Delta Red. While the world thinks that Bison's capture is the first step towards Shadaloo's destruction, Bison's supporters randomly start blowing up locations in England and threaten that it will continue until Bison is released, along with a 2 billion pound payoff. Zangief places bombs in a specific tunnel that connects a train track between England and France, so it's up to Guile, Dee Jay, E. Honda and Cammy to prevent the tunnel's destruction.
13	"Strange Bedfellows"	Bruce Reid Schaefer	February 3, 1996	113
A mysterious warrior starts destroying both Bison's strongholds as well as those under Street Fighter jurisdiction. Both sides blame the other and it eventually comes down to Bison and Guile meeting on a volcanic island for a final showdown. However, clumsy clues were given to both warriors that lead them to the location of the battle by none other than Akuma himself. Akuma wants both Bison and Guile to fight each other to the death, where Akuma will then destroy the winner and steal their chi. Bison and Guile are forced to work together and eventually attack Akuma. Despite Bison and Guile's reluctant teamwork, Akuma is able to escape via teleportation and both Bison and Guile decide to postpone their own battle and head their separate ways, much to the shock and disbelief of their own teammates.

=== Season 2 (1996–97) ===
No.	Title	Written by	Original release date	Prod. code
14	"The Hammer Strikes"	Jeremy Cushner, Will Meugniot (story)	September 21, 1996	201
Needing the help of the Street Fighters, Dhalsim summons them to his remote mountain temple by causing Blanka considerable mental pain. It seems that Satin Hammer has returned and wants to steal an atomic bomb that Dhalsim currently has in his possession. Guile brings Blanka, T. Hawk and Sawada along with him for the mission, even though personal feelings still exist between T. Hawk and Satin Hammer. Eventually, the Street Fighters stop Satin Hammer's plot when Dhalsim deactivates the atomic bomb's countdown timer.
15	"Cammy and the Bachelor"	Len Wein, Will Meugniot (story)	September 28, 1996	202
A crime wave has taken over London, and Bison is thought to be the one responsible for it, so Guile, Cammy, Chun-Li and E. Honda join forces with Delta Red to take down Bison, Birdie and Sodom. During the fight, Bison seemingly takes over Cammy's mind, and she immediately switches allegiances. With a backup plan in full readiness, Bison and Cammy manage to escape.
16	"New Kind of Evil"	Bruce Reid Schaefer, Will Meugniot (story)	October 5, 1996	203
Chun-Li is attacked by mysterious mutant assailants, and her TV crew is kidnapped. She calls for Guile and Blanka's help to track them down, which leads to a search in the sewers. They soon find out that a former scientist of Bison's criminal organization named Quinn is still continuing his mutant research and has mutated 3 thugs named Gunloc, Jumbo Flapjack and The Great Oni into half-man, half-eel/alligator/bat warriors. In the ensuing battle, Blanka receives a mega-dose of mutagen ooze, which makes him even more feral and dangerous.
17	"The World's Greatest Warrior"	Steve Englehart, Will Meugniot (story)	October 12, 1996	204
While visiting their master, Gouken, Ryu and Ken are challenged by the evil Akuma, who claims to have stolen Gouken's chi and will do the same thing to them. Akuma gives Ryu and Ken time to train so they might stand a chance against him. During the course of their sparring sessions however, Ken injures Ryu's left arm, which leaves Ryu in a bad state. Akuma uses this advantage to easily defeat Ryu and steal his chi, only to get defeated himself by Ken's Flaming Dragon Punch (Shoryuken), freeing Gouken and Ryu's chi. Despite his apparent defeat, Akuma vows that he'll return and attempt to steal more chi.
18	"So, You Want to be in Pictures"	Marv Wolfman, Will Meugniot (story)	November 5, 1996	205
Ryu and Ken are asked to help Fei Long with his latest movie project. Investors in the film however pull their funding out of the movie, which leaves Fei Long with no way to raise awareness about the evil crime boss, Wo Fat. Ken is forced to ask his father to re-invest in the film, so it can continue. Ken gets creative license for the script, and writes himself in as the star instead of Fei Long. Both men have a climactic showdown which results in the entire movie studio burning down.
19	"Face of Fury"	Steve Perry, Will Meugniot (story)	November 15, 1996	206
Guile and Blanka take a trip to the Middle East to cool hostilities between the Arabs and the Israelis, but Blanka's temper gets the better of him, and he attacks men on both sides. Vega, watching this drama unfold on a prison TV set, swears revenge against Blanka for scarring his face. Vega easily escapes, and flies to Hawaii for a final battle while taking Mei Lei, Blanka's love interest, hostage. Blanka almost manages to kill Vega, but with the combined efforts of Mei Lei, Guile and Chun-Li, they are able to prevent Vega's death at the hands of Blanka.
20	"Cammy Must Die!"	Len Wein, Will Meugniot (story)	November 23, 1996	207
Bison tasks Cammy and his cybernetic creation La Lupa to steal a priceless Kali statue for him. The statue has meditative powers that Bison hopes will help him heal his wounds from his previous battle with Guile. The Street Fighters team up with Delta Red to help get to the bottom of Cammy's switched allegiances and during the battle, Cammy gets hit on the head and apparently freed from Bison's mental control. Cammy then takes the Street Fighters and Delta Red to Bison's hideout, where she betrays them once more. Bison and Cammy are then able to escape.
21	"The Flame and the Rose"	Steve Englehart, Will Meugniot (story)	December 9, 1996	208
The mystical psychic known as Rose senses that many powers in the world are fluctuating wildly out of control. She blames Ken and Blanka for this sudden energy spike and believes that they are the catalysts to the end of the world. Rose kidnaps them both and forces them to fight against one another, only to realize that they are not evil at all. With their help, she tracks down Bison, who is the true manifestation of evil she had sensed. She then attacks Bison in the mental world just as Ken and Blanka destroy the Kali statue, which destroys Bison's entire castle. Mysteriously, everyone is uninjured, and Bison evades capture once more.
22	"The Warrior King"	Kat Likkel, Will Meugniot (story)	January 4, 1997	209
The powerful Warrior King (guest voice Michael Dorn) has defended his country from the evil Mages for years, but when his Orb of Power is flung into a vortex, he follows it as well. The orb lands in a nation close to Shadaloo, and Bison claims it as his own. The orb has the power to control all weather, and Bison threatens the world with its power. The Street Fighter team is assembled, and Chun-Li is the first to confront Bison. The Warrior King magically appears, and fights Bison's minions with Chun-Li's help. The two quickly fall in love until another vortex appears, and the Warrior King is forced to leave Chun-Li forever. Note: This episode is the first part of a crossover storyline that spanned the other shows in the USA Action Extreme Team lineup. The crossover continued in episodes of Savage Dragon ("Endgame"), Mortal Kombat: Defenders of the Realm ("Resurrection"), and Wing Commander Academy ("Recreation").
23	"The Beast Within"	George Bloom	February 18, 1997	210
Blanka searches the jungle for a mysterious healing plant that could revert him back to his normal form. Guile and Lucinda go to track him down, and hear the same story of the plant from the jungle natives. Blanka then encounters a wild jungle boy who swears revenge against the natives for killing his family. The boy is actually an alien who had crash-landed on Earth along with his family. Blanka befriends the boy, and along with Guile and Lucinda, they defeat the evil natives and the boy returns to his home planet.
24	"Second to None"	Kat Likkel, Will Meugniot (story)	April 11, 1997	211
Ryu is a legend in Shadaloo and Sakura is his most adamant admirer, but when Sagat patrols the streets regularly making sure to burn down any buildings with posters of Ryu in them, Sakura leaps into action. She heads to New York to go see her idol, who has just been visiting Ken in the hospital after he swallowed some poisonous water bugs during a mission in Africa. Ryu meets Sakura, and she convinces him to let her come to Shadaloo along with Guile to help him defeat Sagat once more. Sagat welcomes the challenge, and he and Ryu have another epic confrontation.
25	"Final Fight"	Larry Parr, Will Meugniot (story)	April 27, 1997	212
The new Mayor of Metro City, Mike Haggar, finds himself in a tough situation when his daughter Jessica is kidnapped by a ruthless street gang known as Mad Gear, so it's up to Ryu and Ken to save her, along with Jessica's boyfriend Cody and fellow friend Guy. Escher, Guile and Haggar devise a plan to put Ken and Ryu undercover to infiltrate the gang and discover the whereabouts of Jessica, but Cody takes exception to this as he constantly screams at everyone in protest, nearly jeopardizing the entire plan. The four fighters encounter the Mad Gear gang's leader, Belger, within the group's headquarters and an intense fight soon happens. Ryu and Ken, along with Cody and Guy, are able to fight against Belger and his minions and in the end, the quartet defeats Belger and saves Jessica from the imminent danger while Haggar himself enters into the situation at the very end by breaking a door down. The plot of this episode is based on the arcade game of the same name.
26	"Cammy Tell Me True"	Will Meugniot	May 14, 1997	213
Bison captures Delta Red in a brief battle and the British government are adamant about getting them back, as they know critical government secrets. Bison compiles doomsday codes, which are the launch protocols for every known nuclear bomb on Earth, and plans to not take over the world, but to destroy it. Guile and Chun-Li are given a package from Sagat, containing the secret of Cammy's past, as Sagat does not want the world to be destroyed by Bison. They infiltrate Bison's base and everyone, including a reformed Cammy, Sagat and Delta Red team up to stop Bison and destroy his computer console with one second left on the doomsday timer. Bison is seemingly killed when he is consumed by the computer. Afterwards, Cammy rejects Guile's offer to return to the team, opting to go down her own path.

== Home video release ==
ADV Films released the complete series on Region 1 DVD. The first set, Street Fighter: Code of Honor, was released on April 13, 2003, and contains all the Season 1 episodes, while the second set, Street Fighter: Soul Powers, was released on May 13, 2003, and contains all the Season 2 episodes. Both of the DVD sets are now out of print. The "Final Fight" episode was included as unlockable content in the 2010 video game Final Fight: Double Impact. A Street Fighter 25th Anniversary Collector's Set of games, which includes a Blu-ray Disc of the entire TV series, was released in North America on September 18, 2012. Discotek Media re-released the series in 2015 and released a Blu-ray in 2025. In 2019, all of the Season 1 and Season 2 episodes were available on the Japanese VideoMarket website in Japan.

== Reception ==
Despite lasting two seasons, Street Fighter has received a predominantly negative reception. 411Mania included the series in a 2010 feature titled "The 8 Worst Street Fighter Franchise Failures" on the grounds that "the animation was sub-Captain Planet, the story was contrived, and the dialogue was wretched". Nick Chester of Destructoid called the show "an abomination" and "spectacularly awful". 1UP.com labeled the series "really crappy" and added, "[w]hile SF fans love to quote the Street Fighter movie ... they are usually less enthusiastic about the Saturday morning cartoon". The site also included the series in their list of the "Top 5 Not-So-Classic Video Game Cartoons" on the basis of the plot: "Do you remember when Guile recruited every character in the game into a secret anti-terrorist paramilitary group? I don't either". While Street Fighter was omitted from GamesRadar's 2010 list of "truly horrendous" video game cartoons, it was still mentioned as "a terrible abomination that would have made our list if Darkstalkers hadn't knocked it off".
