= 1996 in anime =

The events of 1996 in anime.

== Accolades ==
- Animation Film Award: Black Jack
- Ōfuji Noburō Award: Rusuban

== Releases ==
Name	Japanese name	Type	Demographic	Regions	Studio
Advancer Tina	アドバンサー ティナ	OVA	Adult		Dandelion Animation Studio
Adventures of Kotetsu	小鉄の大冒険	OVA	Seinen		Daia
Akiko	亜紀子	OVA	Adult		Triple X
Apocalypse Zero	覚悟のススメ	OVA	Shōnen		Ashi Productions
Bakusō Kyōdai Let's & Go!!	爆走兄弟レッツ&ゴー!!	TV	Shōnen		Xebec
Birdy the Mighty	鉄腕バーディー	OVA	Shōnen		Madhouse
Black Jack: The Movie	ブラック・ジャック	Movie	Shōnen		Tezuka Productions
Boys Over Flowers	花より男子(だんご)	TV	Shōjo		Toei Animation
Cinderella Monogatari	シンデレラ物語	TV	Family		Tatsunoko Production
City Hunter: The Secret Service	シティーハンタースペシャル ザ・シークレット・サービス	TV special	Shōnen		Sunrise
Crayon Shin-chan: Adventure in Henderland	クレヨンしんちゃん ヘンダーランドの大冒険	Movie	Shōnen		Shin-Ei Animation
Detective Conan	名探偵コナン	TV	Shōnen		Tokyo Movie Shinsha
Dimensional Adventure Numa Monjar	時空冒険ヌウマモンジャ～	OVA	Shōnen		Production I.G
Doraemon: Nobita and the Galaxy Super-express	ドラえもん のび太と銀河超特急	Movie	Shōnen		Shin-Ei Animation
Dragon Ball: The Path to Power	ドラゴンボール 最強への道	Movie	Shōnen		Toei Animation
Dragon Ball GT	ドラゴンボール GT	TV	Shōnen		Toei Animation
Dragon Quest Saga: Emblem of Roto	ドラゴンクエスト列伝 ロトの紋章	Movie	Shōnen		Nippon Animation
The File of Young Kindaichi	金田一少年の事件簿	Movie	Shōnen		Toei Animation
Famous Dog Lassie	名犬ラッシー	TV			Nippon Animation
Gundam X	機動新世紀ガンダムX	TV	Shōnen		Sunrise
Hell Teacher Nube	地獄先生ぬ〜べ〜	TV	Shōnen		Toei Animation
Hell Teacher Nube	地獄先生ぬ〜べ〜	Movie	Shōnen		Toei Animation
Kaiketsu Zorro	快傑ゾロ	TV	Family		Ashi Productions
Kenji's Trunk	賢治のトランク	Movie	Family		Triangle Staff
Kodomo no Omocha	こどものおもちゃ	TV	Shōjo		Gallop
Lupin III: Dead or Alive	ルパン三世 DEAD OR ALIVE	Movie	Seinen		Tokyo Movie Shinsha
Lupin III: The Secret of Twilight Gemini	ルパン三世『トワイライト☆ジェミニの秘密』	TV special	Seinen		Tokyo Movie Shinsha
Magic User's Club	魔法使いTai!	OVA	Shōjo		Triangle Staff
Martian Successor Nadesico	機動戦艦ナデシコ	TV	Shōnen		Xebec
Maya's Life	マヤの一生	Movie	Family		Mushi Production
Mutant Turtles: Superman Legend	ミュータントタートルズ 超人伝説編	TV	Shōnen		Tsuburaya Productions
My Dear Marie	ぼくのマリー	OVA	Seinen		Pierrot
Ninja Cadets	Ninja者	OVA	Male		AIC, Youmex
The Nintama Rantarō Movie	映画 忍たま乱太郎	Movie	Children		Ajia-do Animation Works
Pipi: Unforgettable Fireflies	PiPi とべないホタル	Movie	Children		Mushi Production
Remi, Nobody's Girl	家なき子レミ	TV			Nippon Animation
Rurouni Kenshin	るろうに剣心 -明治剣客浪漫譚-	TV	Shōnen		Gallop
Saber Marionette J	セイバーマリオネットJ	TV	Shōnen		Studio Junio
Sailor Moon Sailor Stars	美少女戦士セーラームーンセーラースターズ	TV	Shōjo		Toei Animation
Sanctuary	サンクチュアリ	OVA	Seinen		PASTEL
Shamanic Princess	シャーマニックプリンセス	OVA	Shōjo		Triangle Staff
Shinran Shōnin to Ōsha-jō no Higeki	親鸞聖人と王舎城の悲劇	OVA	Shōnen		AIC
Slayers Return	スレイヤーズ RETURN	Movie	Shōnen		J.C.Staff
Sonic the Hedgehog	ソニック★ザ★ヘッジホッグ	OVA	Shōnen		Pierrot
Soreike! Anpanman Soratobu Ehon to Garasu no Kutsu	それいけ! アンパンマン 空とぶ絵本とガラスの靴	Movie	Children		Tokyo Movie Shinsha
Spring and Chaos	イーハトーブ幻想 Kenjiの春	Movie			Group TAC
Starship Girl Yamamoto Yohko	それゆけ!宇宙戦艦ヤマモト・ヨーコ	OVA	Shōnen		J.C.Staff
Those Who Hunt Elves	エルフを狩るモノたち	TV	Shōnen		Group TAC
Variable Geo	ヴァリアブル・ジオ	OVA	General		Chaos Project
Violinist of Hamelin	ハーメルンのバイオリン弾き	Movie	Shōnen		Nippon Animation
Violinist of Hamelin	ハーメルンのバイオリン弾き	TV	Shōnen		Studio Deen
The Vision of Escaflowne	天空のエスカフローネ	TV	Shōnen		Sunrise
VS Knight Lamune & 40 Fire	VS騎士ラムネ&40炎, Basaasu Naito Ramune & 40 Fuaia	TV	Shōnen		Ashi Productions
X	エックス	Movie	Shōjo		Madhouse
Yawara! Special – I've Always Been About You...	YAWARA! Special ずっと君のことが...。	TV special	Seinen		Madhouse
You're Under Arrest	逮捕しちゃうぞ	TV	Seinen		Studio Deen

== Deaths ==
- Hiroshi Fujimoto, manga artist, co-creator of Doraemon

== See also ==
- 1996 in animation
