= USA Action Extreme Team =

Children's television programming block

- Network: USA Network
- Launched: 1995; 31 years ago
- Closed: 1998; 28 years ago
- Country of origin: United States of America
- Owner: Viacom; Universal Studios

USA Action Extreme Team was a children's television programming block on USA Network from 1995 to 1998. The block aired on Sunday mornings, but it later expanded to weekday mornings beginning in 1996 and took over the USA Cartoon Express block's timeslots as a result. The block ended on September 11, 1998, when the network permanently removed children's programming.

== Shows ==
=== Original programs ===
- Savage Dragon (1995–1998)
- Street Fighter (1995–1998)
- Mortal Kombat: Defenders of the Realm (1996–1998)
- Wing Commander Academy (1996–1998)

=== Acquired programs ===
- Action Man (1997)
- Adventures of Sonic the Hedgehog (1995–1997)
- Exosquad (1995–1996)
- Highlander: The Animated Series (1995–1996)
- Sonic the Hedgehog (SatAM) (1995–1997)
- The Superman/Batman Adventures (1995–1996)
- WildC.A.T.s (1995–1996)
- The Adventures of Super Mario Bros. 3 (1996–1997)
- Double Dragon (1996–1998)
- Mighty Max (1996–1998)
- Super Mario World (1996–1997)
- Street Sharks (1996–1997)
- The Super Mario Bros. Super Show! (1996–1997)
- Ultraforce (1996–1998)
- Sailor Moon (1997–1998)
- Gargoyles (1997–98)
