= Georgia Stitt =

American composer and lyricist

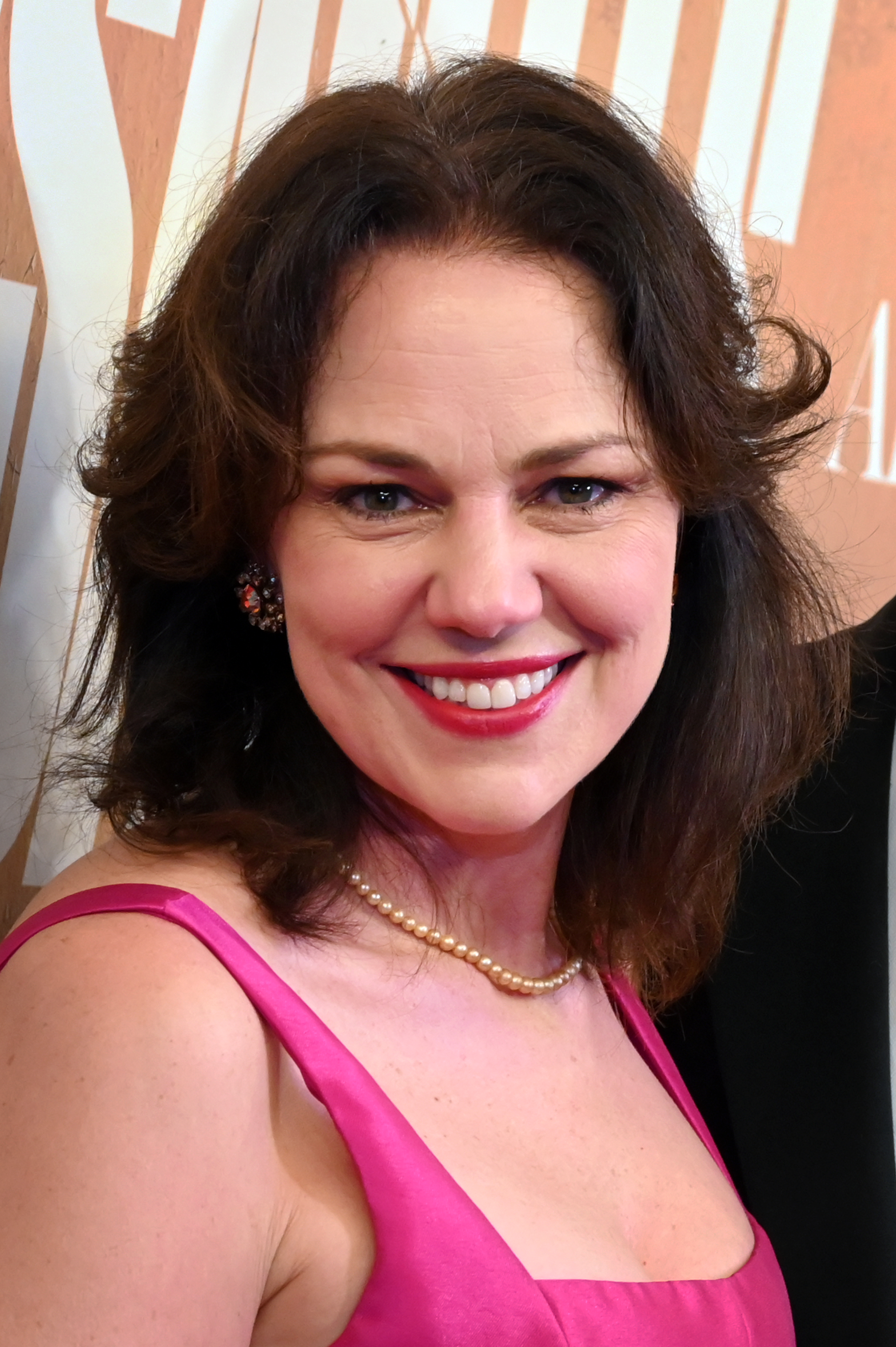
- Stitt in 2025
- Born: June 17, 1972 (age 54); Atlanta, Georgia, U.S.
- Education: Vanderbilt University (BMus); New York University (MFA)
- Spouse: Jason Robert Brown (m. 2003)
- Children: 2

Georgia Stitt (born June 17, 1972) is an American composer and lyricist, arranger, conductor, and musical director.

== Early life and education ==
Stitt was born in Atlanta, but spent most of her childhood in Covington, Tennessee. She earned a B.Mus degree in Music Theory and Composition from Vanderbilt University and a M.F.A. in Musical Theater Writing from New York University.

== Career ==
Stitt began her career in New York City as a pianist, conductor and musical director on Little Shop of Horrors, Avenue Q, Sweet Smell of Success, The Music Man, Titanic, Annie, and the national tour of Parade.

Stitt composed music for The Water, which won the 2008 ANMT “Search for New Voices in American Musical Theatre”. She has also composed for the musicals Snow Child, Samantha Spade - Ace Detective, The Big Boom, Big Red Sun, Sing Me A Happy Song, Mosaic, and Hello! My Baby.

Stitt's recorded music includes A Quiet Revolution, My Lifelong Love, This Ordinary Thursday: The Songs of Georgia Stitt, Alphabet City Cycle, De Profundis, Joyful Noise, A Better Resurrection and The Promise of Light. She regularly performs with Broadway performer Susan Egan, and the two of them maintain a blog called "Glamour And Goop."

Stitt was the vocal coach for season three of America's Got Talent, the on-camera vocal coach for the NBC reality TV show Grease: You're the One That I Want! and the production music coordinator for the Disney–ABC TV production of Once Upon a Mattress starring Tracey Ullman and Carol Burnett. She contributed two songs to the 2008 MTV movie The American Mall.

Stitt founded Maestra Music, a community of female, non-binary, and gender non-conforming musicians in the theatre industry.

== Personal life ==
Since 2003, Stitt has been married to fellow theatre composer Jason Robert Brown. They have two daughters.
