= Newsical =

Newsical The Musical
- The Musical
- Music: Rick Crom
- Lyrics: Rick Crom
- Book: Rick Crom
- Productions: 2004 Off-Broadway 2009 Off-Broadway 2011 Off-Broadway

Newsical (styled "NEWSical") is a musical with music, lyrics, and book written by Rick Crom. In ever-changing songs and sketches, it lampoons current events, hot topics, celebrities, politicians, and other well-known entities. New songs are added on a continual basis to keep up with the headlines.

The musical began with a cabaret production in 2002 before moving Off-off-Broadway in 2004. In 2009 producer Tom D'Angora opened a new edition at Theater Row. It won the Off-Broadway Alliance Award for Best Musical and over the years received several Drama Desk nominations. In 2022 the show played at The Majestic Repertory Theatre in Las Vegas before transferring to the V Theater located in the Miracle Mile Shops at Planet Hollywood.

== Productions ==
=== Original production ===
"What in the World: The NEWSICAL Revue" began as "What in the World?!" at the now defunct Rose's Turn Piano Bar and Cabaret in Greenwich Village in New York City in November 2002 starring Eadie Scott, John Flynn, Deb Spielman and Chris Regan. It was conceived and directed by Collette Black with musical direction and arrangements by John McMahon. This production won the 2003 Nightlife Award for Best Musical Revue.

Producer Fred M. Caruso saw the show and decided to move it to an Off-off Broadway production with the same director and musical director. Newsical began previews at the John Houseman Studio on Theatre Row in New York City on January 9, 2004. The cast was Eadie Scott, John Flynn, Kelly Howe and Chris Regan. It opened officially on January 22, 2004, and ran for eight weeks at the John Houseman.

The show soon began a new run at New York City's Upstairs at Studio 54, with previews starting on September 10, 2004, and an official opening on October 7, 2004. Directed and choreographed by Donna Drake and produced by Fred M. Caruso, some of the musical's targets included Martha Stewart and AOL. The original cast included Kim Cea, Todd Alan Johnson, Stephanie Kurtzuba, Jeff Skowron, Aléna Watters, and Matt Allen. Replacement cast members included Trisha Rapier, Jamison Stern, Jim Newman, and Edward Staudenmayer. The musical closed on April 17, 2005, after 215 performances and then began a U.S. national tour and extended engagement at the Denver Civic Center in 2005.

It was nominated for two Drama Desk Awards: Best Revue and Best Lyrics.

=== 2009 and 2011 productions ===
The 2009 production, entitled Newsical the Musical: We Distort, You Decide, featured a new cast, a new director, and completely new material. The cast included Christine Pedi, Christina Bianco, and Rory O’Malley. The production was directed by Mark Waldrop and began previews on November 24, 2009, in New York City at the 47th Street Theatre, officially opened on December 9, 2009, and closed March 21, 2010. The production was nominated for two 2010 Drama Desk Awards, for Outstanding Revue and Outstanding Lyrics.

The 2011 production, entitled Newsical The Musical: Full Spin Ahead!, began previews on December 13, 2010, and officially opened January 9, 2011, at Theatre Row's Kirk Theatre. In May 2019 it was announced the production would end its run in June after over 3000 performances. The cast included Christina Bianco, Christine Pedi, Michael West, Tommy Walker, and John West. This production was also directed by Waldrop and produced by Tom D'Angora and Elyse Pasquale. The piece received mixed reviews: Theatremania called it a "smart and spiffy new edition" of the show, with "comic lyrics in the same rarified league as those by Gerard Alessandrini of Forbidden Broadway fame. ... What makes the show so particularly delightful is the fresh way Crom has of attacking obvious subjects." NYTheatre.com, however, wrote: "It’s The Daily Show without the genius of Jon Stewart; Forbidden Broadway without the bite of Gerard Alessandrini ... no depth, just on-the-surface parodies and impressions of everything newsworthy from the past 12 months. Some of them are genuinely funny". The production employed a series of "guest stars", including Andrea McArdle in November 2012. The production was nominated for two 2011 Drama Desk Awards: Outstanding Revue and Outstanding Lyrics.

=== 2022 Las Vegas Productions ===
The 2022 NEWSical played a 4 week sold out run at The Majestic Repertory Theater located in the Las Vegas Arts District. It featured Kristen Alderson, as well as longtime cast membersTaylor Crousore, Carly Sakolove, and Michael West. After the success of that run, the show moved to The V Theater at Planet Hollywood to begin an open-ended residency.

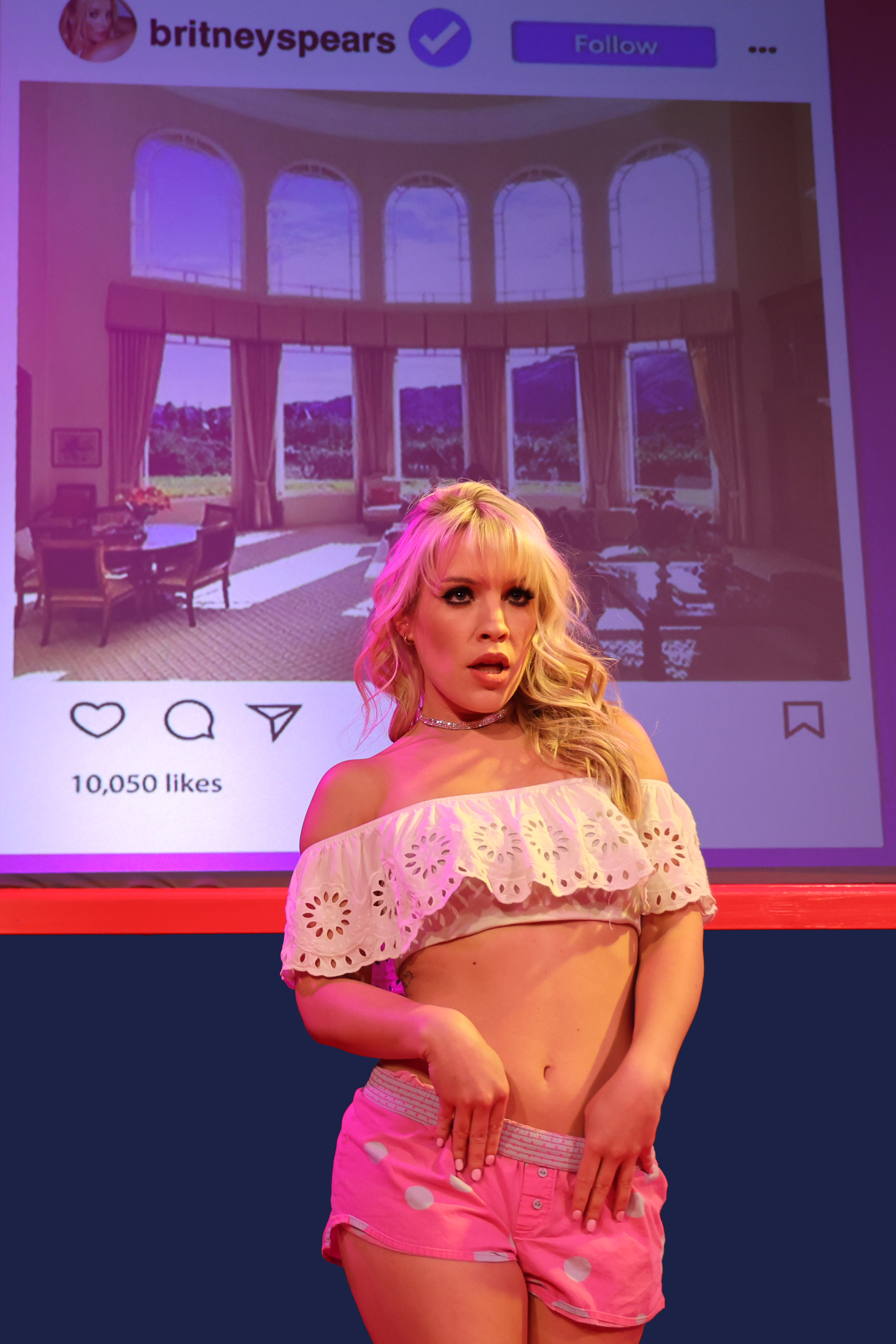
