= Hunter Foster =

American actor

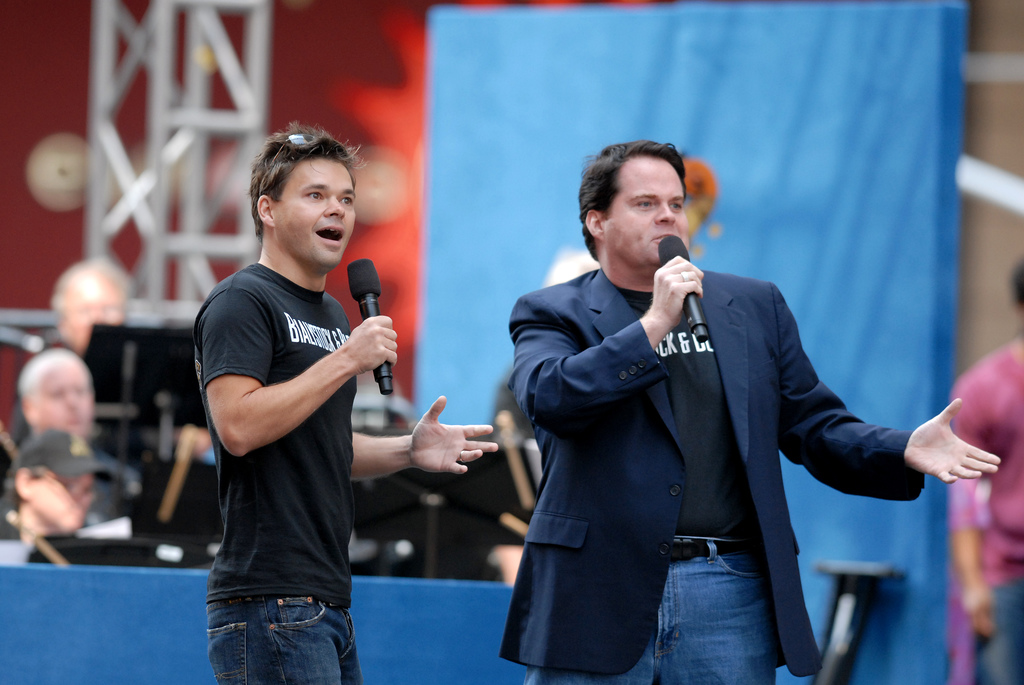
- Hunter Foster (left) in 2006, with John Treacy Egan of The Producers
- Born: June 25, 1969 (age 57); Lumberton, North Carolina, U.S.
- Education: University of Michigan
- Occupations: Musical theatre actor, singer, librettist, playwright, director
- Years active: 1992–present
- Spouse: Jennifer Cody (m. 1998)
- Relatives: Sutton Foster (sister)

Hunter Foster (born June 25, 1969) is an American musical theatre actor, singer, librettist, playwright and director.

== Career ==
After touring in several shows and playing on Broadway, in 2001 he was cast in his breakthrough role of Bobby Strong in Urinetown, for which he received a Lucille Lortel Award and a nomination for an Outer Critics Circle Award. In 2003, Foster starred as Seymour in the Broadway revival of Little Shop of Horrors, for which he received his first Tony Award nomination.

Foster appeared as Leo Bloom in The Producers on Broadway, Ensign Pulver in Mister Roberts at the Kennedy Center, and Ben in Modern Orthodox off-Broadway. He also starred as Molina in Kiss of the Spider Woman at the Signature Theatre in Arlington, Virginia.

Foster's writing includes the libretto for an off-Broadway 2002 musical based on the motion picture Summer of '42 and writing an adaptation of the film Bonnie and Clyde with Urinetown co-star Rick Crom. "Bonnie & Clyde: A Folktale" was workshopped in residency at the Academy for New Musical Theatre, through the ASCAP Foundation Irving Caesar Fund Fellowship, a Producer-Writer Initiative granted through the National Alliance for Musical Theatre. Foster was one of the writers for Rosie O'Donnell's 2008 NBC series Rosie Live, which was cancelled after the first episode.

Foster played the role of music producer Sam Phillips in the musical Million Dollar Quartet on Broadway at the Nederlander Theatre, which opened on April 11, 2010. Foster then portrayed Richard Hoover in the musical Little Miss Sunshine at the La Jolla Playhouse until March 27, 2011. He appeared on the ABC Family show Bunheads as Scotty Sims, the brother of main character Michelle, who is portrayed by his real-life sister Sutton Foster. He originated the role of Bud in the musical The Bridges of Madison County in 2014.

He has directed plays and musicals at the Bucks County Playhouse as well as at regional theaters. He directed Company in 2015 and Buddy: The Buddy Holly Story in June 2016 at Bucks County Playhouse. In April 2027, Hunter is directing The 25th Annual Putnam County Spelling Bee at Coastal Carolina University.

== Personal life ==
Foster is the older brother of actress Sutton Foster. He is married to actress and occasional co-star Jennifer Cody; they have lived in Teaneck, New Jersey.

== Stage credits ==
Year	Title	Role	Notes	Ref.
1992	Cats	Rum Tum Tugger	US National Tour	
1994	Grease	Roger; Danny u/s; Kenickie u/s; Teen Angel u/s	Broadway	
1997	King David	Ensemble; Jonathan u/s; Absalom u/s	Broadway	
1997	Children of Eden	Abel/Ham	Regional	
1998	Les Misérables	Joly; Marius u/s	Broadway	
1998	Footloose	Chuck Cranston	Broadway	
1999	Martin Guerre	Victor	Broadway	
2001	Urinetown	Bobby Strong (original)	Off-Broadway	
2001	Urinetown	Bobby Strong (original)	Broadway	
2002	Earth Girls Are Easy	Mac	Off-Broadway	
2003	Little Shop of Horrors	Seymour	Broadway	
2004–2006	The Producers	Leo Bloom	Broadway & US Tour	
2005	Mister Roberts	Ensign Pulver	Regional	
2005	Modern Orthodox	Ben	Off-Broadway	
2007	The Producers	Leo Bloom	Broadway	
2007	Frankenstein – A New Musical	Victor Frankenstein	Off-Broadway	
2008	Kiss of the Spider Woman	Luis Alberto Molina	Regional	
2008	Dust	Zeke	Off-Broadway	
2009	Happiness	Stanley	Off-Broadway	
2009	Into the Woods	The Baker	Regional	
2010	Million Dollar Quartet	Sam Phillips	Broadway	
2010	Ordinary Days	Jason (original)	Off-Broadway	
2011	Burning	Performer	Off-Broadway	
2012	Hands on a Hardbody	Benny Perkins (original)	Regional	
2012	Hands on a Hardbody	Benny Perkins (original)	Broadway	
2014	The Bridges of Madison County	Bud (original)	Broadway	
2015	Spamalot	King Arthur	Regional	
2016	The Music Man	Harold Hill	Regional	

== Awards and nominations ==
Year	Award ceremony	Category	Show	Result
2002	Lucille Lortel Awards	Outstanding Lead Actor	Urinetown	Nominated
2002	Outer Critics Circle Awards	Outstanding Actor in a Musical	Urinetown	Nominated
2004	Outer Critics Circle Awards	Outstanding Actor in a Musical	Little Shop of Horrors	Nominated
2004	Tony Awards	Best Actor in a Musical	Little Shop of Horrors	Nominated
2004	Drama Desk Awards	Outstanding Actor in a Musical	Little Shop of Horrors	Nominated
2009	Drama Desk Awards	Outstanding Featured Actor in a Musical	Happiness	Nominated
