= Tom D'Angora =

American theatrical producer (born 1979)

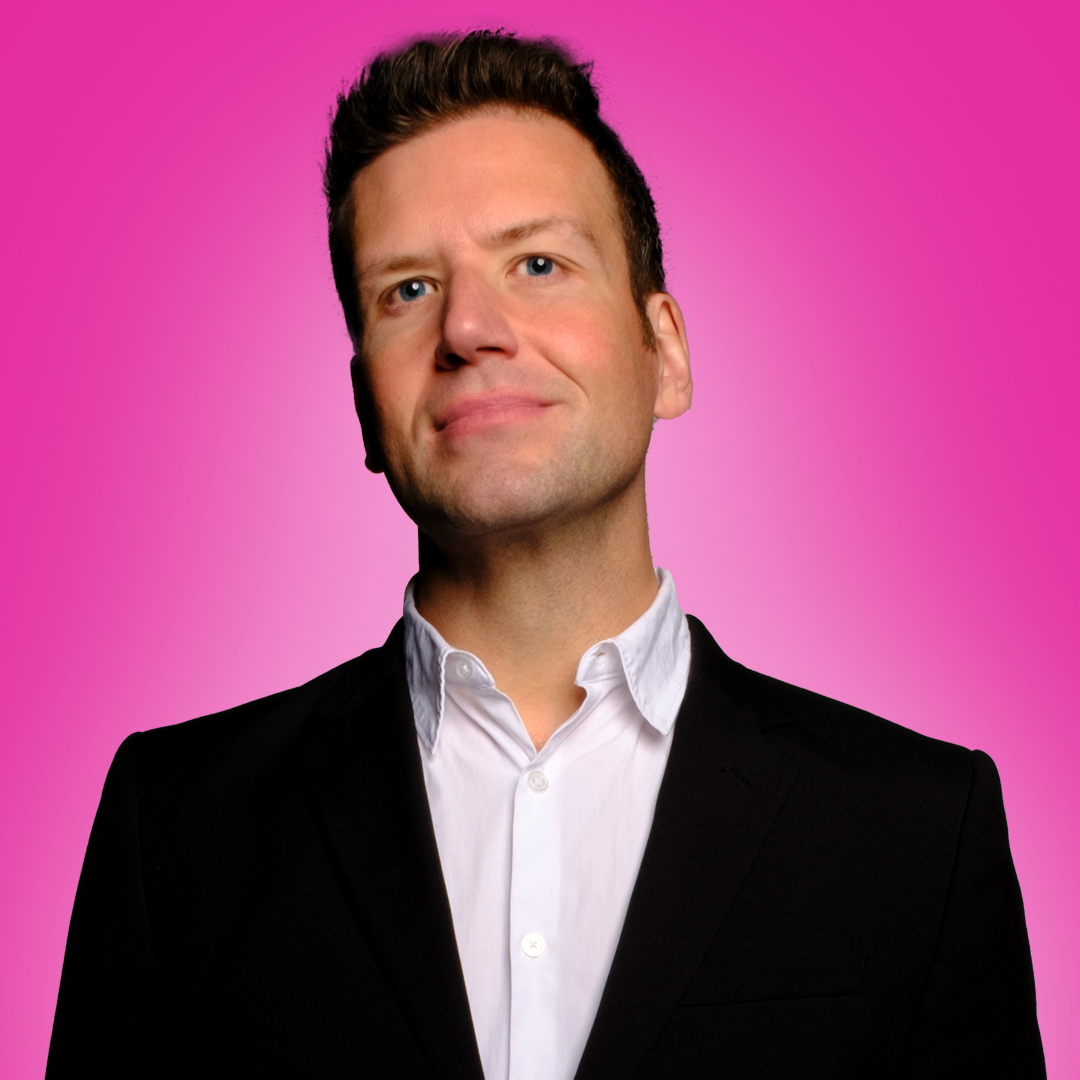
- Born: January 13, 1979 (age 47); Boston, MA
- Occupation: Producer
- Spouse: Michael D'Angora (m. 2012)
- Website: https://TomDangora.com

Tom D'Angora (born January 13, 1979) is an American theater producer. He has received 3 Tony nominations, 2 Emmy nomination, 7 Drama Desk nominations, and has won 3Off-Broadway Alliance Award. His Broadway credits include co-producer of the 2021 revival of Caroline, or Change, Harmony, How to Dance in Ohio, Suffs, the 2024 revival of Cabaret.

His Off-Broadway credits include lead producer of Walking With Bubbles, Newsical The Musical, Naked Boys Singing, The Marvelous Wonderettes, A Musical About Star Wars, Back In Pictures and the Backstage Bistro Award-winning Divas I've Done and A Broadway Diva Christmas.

Between December 2020 and July 2021, D'Angora produced several virtual fundraiser concerts to save local theaters. They included The West Bank Cafe/Laurie Beechman Theatre, the Birdland, The LAByrinth Theatre, and The York Theatre and campaigns for The Theatre World Awards and The Stonewall Inn Safe Spaces.

== Early career ==
D'Angora starred in the 2001 Provincetown production of Naked Boys Singing and in 2007 took over producing responsibilities. He produced and directed the 2009, 2010, 2011, and 2012 performances. In addition to 'Naked Boys Singing,' he produced shows like 'Golden Girls,' 'Debbie Does Dallas: The Musical,' and 'ICONS: Drag Extravaganza,' which transferred to an Off-Broadway run in 2011.

D'Angora's first experience with producing was with his one-man show titled Divas I've Done. The show won D'Angora the Backstage Bistro Award for Best Musical Comedy. In 2005, D'Angora and his now-husband, Michael Duling, brought Maya Days, Kathy Brier, Marla Schaffel, and Christine Pedi together for the seasonal musical revue A Broadway Diva Christmas.

== Career ==
In 2010 D'Angora began producing responsibilities for NEWSical: the Musical, the ever-evolving Off-Broadway musical that spoofs newsmakers, celebrities, politicians, and pop culture trends. The show was nominated for Drama Desk Awards for the 2010 edition, titled "We Distort You Decide." The 2011 edition, "Full Spin Ahead!", was nominated for the Drama Desk Award for Best Musical Revue and won the Off-Broadway Alliance Award for Best New Musical. In 2012, D'Angora opened his third consecutive edition of NEWSical titled "End of the World Edition," which was nominated for a Drama Desk Award for Best Musical Revue.

In 2012 D'Angora announced that NEWSical would have a rotating cast of celebrity guest stars appearing. Celebrity guest stars included Perez Hilton, Andrea McArdle, Cheri Oteri, Carson Kressley, Jackee Harry, Kandi Burruss and La Toya Jackson. By the end of its run in 2019 at Theatre Rows Kirk Theater, it was the longest-running show in the theater complex and the 5th longest running off-Broadway musical. During the COVID-19 pandemic, NEWSical was the only union approved NYC based production to perform when it did a socially distanced, one-night-only, engagement at The Lied Center For Performing Arts in Lincoln, NE. The show was later live streamed as a benefit for The Actors Fund of America.

In 2012, D'Angora took over producing and general management responsibilities for Naked Boys Singing! after having produced several versions of the show in Provincetown. In 2021 he opened a production of the show in Las Vegas. Originally set to star Aaron Carter, the production and the star parted ways due to a breach of contract involving the star not wanting to be vaccinated against COVID-19. The production opened a few weeks after originally planned without Carter.

D'Angora served as lead producer of the 2016 revival of The Marvelous Wonderettes. The production's run surpassed the original production, and after 567 performances, closed on January 6, 2019.

On May the Fourth, 2019, D'Angora opened the musical comedy A Musical About Star Wars. The show-within-a-show follows two "Star Wars nerds" as they attempt to put on a Star Wars tribute musical only to have their co-star interrupt their performance with a political protest. The show transferred from its original home at Theatre Row to a larger venue, St. Luke's Theater, shortly after opening. The show's cast album was later released on Broadway Records.

Addy & Uno was D'Angora's first foray into children's entertainment. It was the first Off-Broadway family musical to address disability. The show centered around a group of friends with various disabilities (Autism, ADHD, Low-Vision, Cerebral Palsy) as they encouraged their friend Uno to overcome his nerves and compete in the school's math competition. The show was nominated for the Off-Broadway Alliance Award.

D'Angora made his Broadway debut as a co-producer on the Roundabout Theatre Company's revival of Caroline, Or Change.

== Television and streaming ==
D'Angora created and produced the drama, Mélange, which starred Morgan Fairchild. The show was inspired by his love of ABC daytime soap operas One Life to Live, All My Children, and the prime time camp-class Dynasty. The pilot episode premiered on Logo TV's digital platforms on May 20, 2020.

On December 25, 2020 D'Angora served as producer for an all-star "Christmas Day Telethon" to Save The West Bank Cafe and Laurie Beechman Theatre. The event was attached to a GoFundMe which brought in over $300,000 for the venue which was in debt from the pandemic which shut down Broadway.

A few weeks later, he with Michael D'Angora and Tim Guinee produced another fundraiser and streaming event to save the historic jazz club Birdland. The concert featured President Bill Clinton, Clive Davis, Wynton Marsalis, Veronica Swift, Sting, Whoopi Goldberg, George Coleman, Ravi Coltrane, Norm Lewis, Lillias White.

D'Angora has appeared in reality television shows Real Housewives of Atlanta (Bravo), Life with La Toya (OWN), and Edens World (Logo). NEWSical and D'Angora were the subject of a full episode of Life with La Toya in 2014. D'Angora has also worked in film serving as a co producer on The Big Gay Musical and Executive producer on Mangus.

== Awards and honors ==
NEWSical The Musical won the first annual Off-Broadway Alliance Award for Best Musical in 2011. It was nominated for The Drama Desk Awards in 2011 for Best Revue and Best Lyrics

December 12, 2021 was declared "Tom and Michael D'Angora Appreciation Day" by the NY State Senate to commemorate the day they began their charitable fundraising for theatrical venues affected by the pandemic and for their work advocating for LGBTQ+ Equality.
