= Mortal Kombat: Defenders of the Realm =

American animated series

- Official DVD cover
- Created by: Midway Games
- Based on: Mortal Kombat by Ed Boon; John Tobias
- Developed by: Lawrence Kasanoff; Joshua Wexler; Sean Catherine Derek
- Voices of: Clancy Brown; Brian Tochi; Olivia d'Abo; Cree Summer; Luke Perry; Dorian Harewood; Ron Perlman
- Composer: Jonathan Sloate
- Country of origin: United States
- Original language: English
- No. of seasons: 1
- No. of episodes: 13

Production
- Executive producers: Allison Savitch; Phil Roman; Lawrence Kasanoff; Anne Damato
- Producers: Michel Goguen; Susan Levin; Joshua Wexler
- Running time: 20 minutes
- Production companies: Film Roman; Threshold Entertainment; USA Studios

Original release
- Network: USA Network
- Release: September 21 – December 14, 1996

Mortal Kombat: Defenders of the Realm is an American animated series based on the popular Mortal Kombat video game series. Produced by Threshold Entertainment and Film Roman for USA Studios, it aired on the USA Network's Action Extreme Team animation block for one season of thirteen episodes from September 21 to December 14, 1996, back-to-back with the Street Fighter animated series. The show serves as a combination of an alternative sequel to the events of the 1995 feature film and is based on Ultimate Mortal Kombat 3.

== Plot ==
The show focuses on a group of warriors assembled by Raiden (spelled Rayden in the series) to defend Earthrealm from invaders who entered through portals from various other dimensions. The assembled warriors included Liu Kang, Kurtis Stryker, Sonya Blade, Jax, Kitana, and Sub-Zero, with Nightwolf functioning mostly as tech support but still entering the fray on various occasions. The warriors operated out of a hidden base from where Nightwolf and Rayden monitored portal openings; the warriors would fly dragon-shaped jets to deal with disturbances. Shao Kahn was something of an archvillain throughout the series despite appearing in only four of the series' thirteen episodes, being responsible for allowing other realms to invade Earthrealm.

The characters and their backgrounds were mostly continuous with the movie and Threshold's representation of the series canon, though many original characters exclusive to the program were introduced and some elements of Mortal Kombat 3 were included. The episode plots themselves shared little relation with that of any of the games, though the character designs are based on their MK3 and Ultimate Mortal Kombat 3 sprites (except for Kitana, whose design looks like a blend of her MKII and her UMK3 looks). Kung Lao, Johnny Cage, Mileena, Sindel, Goro and Kintaro were not shown or referenced in the show at all, while characters based on Reptile, Baraka, and Jade were featured.

The finale involved Kitana leading a rebellion from Outworld against Kahn. The most notable aspect of the show was that it provided the debut of Quan Chi, who would go on to become a major antagonist in the game series.

== Voice cast ==
- Clancy Brown as Raiden
- Olivia d'Abo as Sonya Blade
- Dorian Harewood as Jax
- Luke Perry as Sub-Zero
- Cree Summer as Kitana
- Ron Perlman as Kurtis Stryker
- Tod Thawley as Nightwolf
- Brian Tochi as Liu Kang

== Episodes ==
No.	Title	Written by	Original release date
1	"Kombat Begins Again"	Sean Catherine Derek	September 21, 1996
The Defenders of the Realm face a pack of invading cybernetic units (seemingly Shao Kahn's basic footsoldiers) led by Sektor and Cyrax. The situation takes a turn for the worse until Sub-Zero intervenes and assists the warriors in forcing the invaders back to Outworld. Sub-Zero tries to warn the warriors of the incoming threat from Scorpion, although Sonya Blade is hesitant to believe him due to the fact he betrayed his clan. Following Rayden's instructions, the warriors reluctantly return to base with Sub-Zero in company. Shortly afterwards, a group of Nomad warriors locate and invade the base, further raising Sonya's belief that Sub-Zero has betrayed them. After staving off the Nomad invaders outside, Sub-Zero and Nightwolf fight off the ones inside, with Sub-Zero defeating their leader, Karbrac. Sonya is finally convinced that the runaway Lin Kuei is on their side. Before apologies can be made, an alarm sounds, indicating Scorpion's approach. Despite the games' graphic nature, DotR was aimed at a younger audience and thus contained toned-down violence. During a recreated flashback of Liu Kang's fight scene with Sub-Zero from the movie, Sub-Zero is merely frozen by the water thrown by Liu Kang, whereas in the film he was impaled by a water-turned-to-ice stake. Although Baraka makes no appearance in the series, the Nomad leader in this episode is named Karbrac; this was likely intended as a phonetic anagram of Baraka's name. His race was also referred to as the Nomads throughout the series, as they were not renamed as Tarkatan until well after the show's run.
2	"Sting of the Scorpion"	Sean Catherine Derek	September 28, 1996
Continuing from the last episode, the team soon discover that a rift has opened up in an ancient burial ground in the Tibetan mountains. Drawing on the powers of darkness, Scorpion, an undead warrior who was denied entrance to the realm of honored dead and banished to the realm of lost souls, has amassed a force of undead warriors and seeks to continue increasing his force with undead warriors from all the realms. The warriors follow Scorpion to Outworld and find themselves in danger of alerting Shao Kahn to their presence. Eventually, the Earth warriors find themselves in a tomb built for Outworld's most evil of warriors. It is also the resting place of the sorcerer Shang Tsung. Sub-Zero charges after Scorpion, who reveals his intention to resurrect Shang Tsung. Sub-Zero's anger gets the better of him, though, and he is quickly subdued. Sub-Zero entrusts Liu Kang with the task of defeat Scorpion because he believes that he could've defeated his brother without the help Kitana gave him. Liu Kang defeats Scorpion in Mortal Kombat with help from Sub-Zero. Sub-Zero almost throws Scorpion from the top of Shang Tsung's tomb until Liu reminds him that, without honor, he would be no better than his brother. Along with his undead soldiers, Scorpion is sent back to the realm of lost souls. Just when the earth warriors think that their work is done, Nightwolf contacts Liu Kang to inform him that another rift has been found. "Sting of the Scorpion" featured music by Psykosonik and Sister Machine Gun in addition to the regular score composed by Jonathan Sloate.
3	"Acid Tongue"	Sean Catherine Derek	October 5, 1996
A new dangerous enemy, the Raptors, creatures of a strange reptilian race led by Komodai (more than once referred to as simply "Reptile"), appears before the Earth warriors. Jax's cybernetic implants are damaged by Komodai's acid, causing the loss of important microchips, without which his arms cannot function properly. As a result, Jax loses his self-confidence, and Sonya returns to the place of battle to look for them, but is soon abducted by Komodai. Because there are also other battles to be fought, the Earth Warriors combat Sheeva's Shokan warriors, while Jax searches for Sonya. In his desire to help Sonya, Jax relies on brains instead of brawn to defeat Komodai on his own. Though Jax has learned not to rely on his strength-enhancing arms for his self-confidence, he returns to using them anyway as a tactical advantage. This episode marked the first time at any point in the MK canon that Jax removed his metal implants, since having had them originally installed as part of the MK3 storyline. Komodai is Reptile's original name in the show. Guest Voices: Dawnn Lewis (Sheeva), Josh Blyden (Komodai)
4	"Skin Deep"	Steve Granat and Cydne Clark	October 12, 1996
A strange energy emission in New Guinea leads the Earth Warriors to Rain, Kitana's ex-fiancé who was thought to be long dead, sparking jealousy in Liu Kang. Rain, unmasked throughout the entire episode, informs them that Shao Kahn is seeking a powerful scimitar hidden in a sacred temple. The Earth Warriors ready for battle before it's too late, only to discover later that Rain is a traitor and has abducted Kitana. Liu Kang confronts Rain in his castle, but after freeing Kitana, Kitana decides to battle Rain herself to defend her honor. As the battle comes to a close, the castle starts to fall apart, and Rain flees while Liu Kang and Kitana return to safety with Rayden's help before the castle collapses entirely. Liu's final battle against Shang Tsung from the first movie is shown in flashback at the beginning of the episode, but when Shang Tsung is knocked into the pit, the array of metal stakes seen in the film is absent and he instead falls to his death onto flat ground. He is also shown wearing his MK3 outfit. Guest Voices: Rino Romano (Rain), Neil Ross (Shang Tsung / Motaro), Frank Welker (Hydrant the five-headed creature)
5	"Old Friends Never Die"	Mark Hoffmeier	October 19, 1996
Sub-Zero goes out to meet with his friend Smoke, who unexpectedly returns after being gone for many years. Sub-Zero and Smoke were best friends before Oniro, the Grandmaster of the Lin Kuei clan, gave the order for automation of the ninjas. Sub-Zero managed to escape this fate, but Smoke was captured and transformed. Now Sub-Zero wants to know if his old friend has retained a human soul, or if he became only a machine for murder. Smoke's orders are to annihilate Sub-Zero and he nearly succeeds, until he suddenly realizes that he has retained his soul, and fights alongside his friend Sub-Zero once again. They team up to drive Oniro away, and though Smoke will not befriend Sub-Zero again since the latter is an enemy of the Lin Kuei, he honors their past oath to never fight each other in combat, and then disappears. Smoke, Cyrax, and Sektor were all seen unmasked and in their human forms during a flashback scene at the Lin Kuei's training compound. Sektor was depicted as a black man and the others as Caucasian, but his description was passed on to Cyrax for Mortal Kombat Gold. Despite the addition of the original character Oniro, this episode's storyline was derived from MK3. Guest Voices: Jeremy Ratchford (Smoke), Jack Angel (Oniro / Computer)
6	"Familiar Red"	Story by : Joshua Wexler and Sean Catherine Derek; Teleplay by : Sean Catherine Derek	October 26, 1996
When Kano begins creating unnatural portals to intentionally torment the Earth Warriors, they realize that the Black Dragon gang is back again. Nightwolf gets very worried after leading his fellow warriors to temporary rips around the world that close before they arrive, but takes umbrage with the warriors deeming all of these incidents as incorrect readings of his computers. Encouraged by Rayden to not be so overreliant on technology, he uses his magic force to find out where the Black Dragons are; it turns out their shelter is hidden under an Egyptian pyramid. When the Earth Warriors arrive, they encounter and defeat its guardians. Then the struggle with Kano begins, who had already lost an earlier fight with Sonya in the first Mortal Kombat tournament and loses this fight as well. Kano tells them that the pyramid is rigged with explosives, but the Earth Warriors escape the pyramid just in time to escape the explosion. This episode featured the debut of the newly revised Kano. His nationality was changed from American to Australian as a tribute to actor Trevor Goddard's performance in the first MK movie, and his fight with Sonya therein was briefly seen in flashback midway through the episode. However, in a continuity violation, he is beforehand seen bald and in his MK3 outfit during a scene in which Sonya's Special Forces partner, Wexler (named after Threshold writer/producer Josh Wexler), was killed prior to the tournament. Guest Voices: Michael Des Barres (Kano / Captain), John Vernon (Shao Kahn)
7	"Fall from Grace"	Mark Hoffmeier	November 2, 1996
In a battle against Shokan warriors, Sonya acts with overconfidence. As a result, Stryker is seriously wounded. He decides to suspend Sonya because he feels she can't work as a team with the others. After being ordered to take Stryker back to the compound, with Nightwolf out to help fending off Sheeva's troops, they are attacked by a detachment of Shokan warriors. Learning a lesson on teamwork while battling the Shokan warriors, she regains Stryker's confidence and is reinstated. Guest Voices: Dawnn Lewis (Sheeva), John Garry (Zenkaro)
8	"The Secret of Quan-Chi"	Steve Granat and Cydne Clark	November 9, 1996
Quan Chi (hyphenated in the episode title) comes upon the gem of Tetsurri, a magic crystal with which he is able to awaken all the evil in a human soul. Using it, the sorcerer, in disguise as a refugee fleeing Outworld, influences the Earth Warriors and causes them to turn against each other. The Earth is now out of any defense, and would be conquered by Quan Chi, if not for Nightwolf, who escaped the crystal's influence. It is Nightwolf who destroys the evil crystal and ruins Quan Chi's black magic. This episode marked Quan Chi's first appearance in any sort of Mortal Kombat media. He later appeared in the video games with Mortal Kombat Mythologies: Sub-Zero and Mortal Kombat 4. There are also enemies in this episode that resemble Water God from Mortal Kombat Mythologies: Sub-Zero. Also there is a fiery skull head that could be The Fire God. Guest Voice: Nick Chinlund (Quan Chi)
9	"Resurrection"	Story by : Joshua Wexler and Sean Catherine Derek; Teleplay by : Sean Catherine Derek	November 16, 1996
Shao Kahn resurrects Shang Tsung and entrusts him with a sphere that controls the elements of nature (fire, wind, water and earth). Shang Tsung is the most suitable person to possess the sphere, because the more malicious the master is, the stronger the magic sphere becomes. The old enemy of good organizes different natural disasters and weakens Rayden. The Earth Warriors are trapped, so nobody can help the God of Thunder. Thus, he is the one who has to decide the fate of the world. But good, even though it grew weak, is stronger than the evil even when strengthened with the forces of magic. Having defeated Shang Tsung, Rayden gets rid of the sphere by sending it into space. Note: This episode is the third part of a crossover storyline that spanned the other shows in the USA Action Extreme Team lineup. The crossover began in episodes of Street Fighter ("The Warrior King") and Savage Dragon ("Endgame"), and concluded in Wing Commander Academy ("Recreation"). Guest Voices: Neil Ross (Shang Tsung), John Vernon (Shao Kahn), Peter Renaday (Shadow Priest)
10	"Swords of Ilkan"	Story by : Cynthia Harrison and Brooks Wachtel; Teleplay by : Sean Catherine Derek	November 23, 1996
This episode begins with a battle between Kitana and Amazon leader Zara in the realm of Ilkan, following the death of Kitana's mentor, Ramath. A guard arrives in time and arrests Zara. Although the battle was interrupted, Kitana knows that it will continue some day. Many years ago the enemy of the princess returned. In the past, Zara managed to find one of the two swords of Ilkan. When these swords are connected, it is possible to open portals to other worlds. Jax, Sonya and Kitana suddenly disappear through a portal that the other Earth Warriors cannot pass through. To get to the second sword, Zara takes Jax as a hostage. Kitana and Sonya go to Ilkan to save their friend. They defeat a gigantic guardian inside a temple and take the sword, but Kitana is extremely hesitant to surrender the sword to Zara. The unfinished battle continues, and this time the princess wins and Jax is rescued. The swords are now lost after Kitana throws them into a portal. "Swords of Ilkan" is the only episode in the series with only original guest characters. There is an energy creature that resembles The Earth God from Mortal Kombat Mythologies: Sub-Zero only in different coloring. In fact, since Quan Chi first appeared in the show, then maybe it could be The Earth God. Guest Voices: Nancy Linari (Zara), Brock Peters (Ramath), Frank Welker (Earth God)
11	"Amends"	Story by : Joshua Wexler and Sean Catherine Derek; Teleplay by : Steve Granat and Cydne Clark	November 30, 1996
Sonya and Sub-Zero go out to find out the plan of the Black Dragons, but they are attacked in an abandoned theater. Sonya is wounded, but rescued by a former member of the Black Dragon - Kabal. Years ago, he was one of the best warriors in his clan, but Shao Kahn, fearing Kabal's possible conversion to the side of good, therefore ordered his warriors to destroy him. By a miracle, Kabal survived in his fight with the hired killers, but his face was viciously scarred, and he was forced thereafter to rely on a respirator while concealing his face behind a mask. Kano and his servants open a portal to lead the army of evil to other worlds. With the help of Kabal, the Earth warriors manage to crush these forces unleashed by Kano and destroy the portal. The Earthrealmers offer Kabal the chance to join them, but he chooses to continue his crusade against evil alone. Sonya is notably moved by Kabal's story and is upset when he leaves. One rerun of "Amends" aired during the fifth annual UNICEF International Children's Day of Broadcasting. The story of Kabal almost exactly follows his MK3 story, where he's portrayed as a protagonist minus the subplot of Kano's betrayal. Guest Voices: Kevin Michael Richardson (Kabal / Black Dragon Thug), Michael Des Barres (Kano)
12	"Abandoned"	Story by : Joshua Wexler, Sean Catherine Derek, and Reed Robbins; Teleplay by : Sean Catherine Derek	December 7, 1996
Jax is tired of the endless battles and elects to quit the team, retiring to his deceased grandfather's isolated cabin. There, he makes the acquaintance of a girl named Ruby, who is secretly working as one of Shao Kahn's agents. She tries to find out the location of the Earth warriors' base. Jax then finds himself captured by Ermac's forces and is imprisoned in a cave under Shao Kahn's castle, where he was put for torture. His comrades set out to rescue him, but are outnumbered by Kahn's troops and are surrounded. It seems that their destruction is inevitable, but at this moment Ruby decides to help the Earth warriors by leading them through a hidden exit. Jax realizes that a peaceful life is impossible while Earth is exposed to danger from another realm, and returns to the squad. While Ruby did not exist in the games, aspects of her character (most notably her red ninja outfit) bear similarity to and makes her resemble Skarlet, a glitch character who would later become a full-fledged fighter in the 2011 reboot of Mortal Kombat. She is also a traitor to her home realm of Edenia, much like Tanya, who would be introduced in Mortal Kombat 4. Guest Voices: John Vernon (Shao Kahn)
13	"Overthrown"	Story by : Joshua Wexler, Sean Catherine Derek, Steve Granat and Cydne Clark; Teleplay by : Sean Catherine Derek	December 14, 1996
In the series finale, the Defenders of the Realm prepare for the final battle with Shao Kahn's forces on the anniversary of the unfortunate death of Jerrod, the king of Edenia and Kitana's father. They anxiously await the confrontation, but Liu Kang shows more apprehension because a victory would mean that Kitana would have to leave the team to rule Edenia. Kitana brokers an agreement with Sheeva's Shokan warriors, but she doesn't know that she is in fact Shang Tsung, who transformed to look like Sheeva. Kitana and the rebellion forces break into Shao Kahn's castle and demand that Shao Kahn hands over his rule to the princess. Suddenly Shang Tsung appears with the warriors of the real Sheeva. The sorcerer is also after the throne of Outworld. But Tsung forgets one thing; Sheeva and the Shokan also have enemies in Outworld. Rayden finds out Shang Tsung's plan and disrupts the fight. The god of thunder brings with him the worst enemy of Sheeva; Motaro, along with the entire Centaur and Tarkatan armies. The defenders escape through a portal as the Shokan and Centaurs do battle. The insurrection may have failed, but the realm of Earth has not fallen and Mortal Kombat continues. It is unknown what happens next as the series ends. This is the only episode that featured different animation that was of a higher quality. Guest Voices: John Rhys-Davies (Asgarth), John Vernon (Shao Kahn), Dawnn Lewis (Sheeva)

== Home media ==
Three volumes of 12 episodes (excluding "Sting of the Scorpion") were released in the UK on VHS and DVD formats, while in Australia, the complete series was released across six volumes. The complete series was also released on a two-DVD set in Russia, containing both Russian and English dubbing. Brazil has also received a three-disc DVD set, with a new Brazilian Portuguese dub and original English audio. In Spain, they received four volume DVDs with the same Castilian Spanish dub aired on TV in the 90s. In the United States, only a select number of episodes were individually available on VHS, while there was never a DVD release.

== Reception ==
=== Critical response ===
Defenders of the Realm received a negative response from viewers and critics, and was canceled after only one season. In 2011, 1UP.com featured the series in the article "The Top Ten Times Mortal Kombat Went Wrong", calling it "a terrible, one-liner-packed train wreck of a kids' show". The site also included the show among their list of the top five "Not-So-Classic Video Game Cartoons" while quoting the introduction's opening line: "'Much has changed since the last Mortal Kombat tournament!' Yeah, like nobody being allowed to kill each other anymore". GameFront called it an "abomination". GamesRadar included the series among their picks for the worst video game-based animated TV shows: "Not content with skimping on violence, the show's creators felt that they also needed to ... teach the youth of America life lessons with comically cheesy public service announcements". Dorkly rated it sixth in their list of the top eight worst animated video game TV adaptations, citing the lack of violence as a contributor to its demise.

== See also ==
- Darkstalkers (TV series)
- Street Fighter (TV series)
