= The Savage Dragon (TV series) =

- Genre: Superhero
- Based on: Savage Dragon by Erik Larsen
- Developed by: Dean Stefan (seasons 1–2); Bob Forward (season 2)
- Directed by: Craig Wilson; Chris Bartleman (season 2)
- Voices of: Jim Cummings; Danny Mann; Jennifer Hale; Dorian Harewood; René Auberjonois; Frank Welker; Kath Soucie; Rob Paulsen; Jeff Glen Bennett; Tony Jay
- Composers: Sean Murray; Shawn K. Clement (season 2)
- Countries of origin: United States; Canada
- Original language: English
- No. of seasons: 2
- No. of episodes: 26

Production
- Executive producers: Sheldon S. Wiseman; Scott De Las Casas; Erik Larsen (season 1); Brian Ray (season 2)
- Producers: Weldon Poapst; Chris Bartleman (season 2); Blair Peters (season 2)
- Running time: 22 minutes
- Production companies: Lacewood Productions (season 1); Studio B Productions (season 2); Universal Cartoon Studios; P3 Entertainment; USA Studios

Original release
- Network: USA Network
- Release: October 21, 1995 – December 18, 1996

The Savage Dragon is a half-hour animated television series aired as part of the Cartoon Express on the USA Network. Co-produced by Universal Cartoon Studios, P3 Entertainment, Lacewood Productions for season 1 and Studio B Productions for season 2, it ran for 26 episodes from 1995 to 1996 and featured numerous supporting characters from the comic book series, including She-Dragon, Horde, Barbaric, Mako and Overlord.

The Dragon was voiced by Jim Cummings. Additional voices were provided by Mark Hamill, Michael Dorn, Jennifer Hale, René Auberjonois, Frank Welker, Paul Eiding, Rob Paulsen and Tony Jay.

The series was formerly available to stream on Peacock.

== Cast ==
=== Main cast ===
- René Auberjonois as Horde
- Jeff Glen Bennett as Barbaric / Mako The Shark / Sergeant Howard Niseman
- Jim Cummings as Savage Dragon / Doubleheader
- Jennifer Hale as She-Dragon
- Dorian Harewood as Lieutenant Frank Darling / R. Richard Richards
- Tony Jay as Overlord
- Danny Mann as Fiend / Open Face
- Rob Paulsen as John Backwood / Octopus
- Kath Soucie as Alex Wilde
- Frank Welker as Arachnid / Basher

=== Additional voices ===
- Gregg Berger
- Ruth Buzzi
- Darleen Carr
- Dave Coulier as Gilroy
- Michael Dorn as The Warrior King
- Paul Eiding
- Jeannie Elias
- Richard Gilbert Hill
- Allan Lurie
- Mark Hamill
- Robert Picardo
- Peter Renaday
- Neil Ross
- Cree Summer
- Marcelo Tubert
- Paul Williams

== Episodes ==
=== Season 1 (1995–1996) ===
No.	Title	Written by	Original release date	Prod. code
1	"R.S.V.P."	Steve Roberts; Duane Capizzi	October 21, 1995	101
Overlord and Arachnis abduct Alex and Frank to kidnap Dragon.
2	"Possession"	Henry Gilroy	October 26, 1995	102
Lab workers mysteriously develop criminal behavior, and Barbaric is the latest victim. Dragon soon discovers it is the work of a leech-covered creature named Horde.
3	"Undercover"	Steve Roberts	November 2, 1995	103
Alex goes undercover as a freak to infiltrate the Vicious Circle.
4	"Dragonsmasher"	Ernie Jon	November 9, 1995	104
Dragon discovers a plot between Overlord and an unscrupulous congressional candidate, and must battle a cyborg called "the Dragonsmasher".
5	"Locomotion"	Steve Cuden	November 15, 1995	105
Overlord's henchmen take over a train Alex is on, so they can destroy an unfinished tunnel.
6	"She-Dragon"	Henry Gilroy	December 20, 1995	106
Wannabe crime fighter She-Dragon screws up Dragon's work, but they must team up when Alex is kidnapped.
7	"Hurt"	Richard Stanley	December 13, 1995	107
Superfreak Bludgeon wants revenge on Dragon for arresting his partner. Meanwhile, Alex falls for a paramedic prejudiced against freaks, putting a wedge in her and Dragon's relationship.
8	"Web"	Steve Roberts	November 22, 1995	108
Dragon is sent to a southern town to bring prisoners back to Chicago, but must team up with the town's sheriff to stop a rash of disappearances.
9	"Hit-Man"	Steve Cuden	December 7, 1995	109
Overlord clones Dragon to gain access to a freak mayoral candidate and assassinate him.
10	"Red-Handed"	Richard Stanley	January 3, 1996	110
Dragon finally sends Overlord to prison, but is shocked when Barbaric breaks him free.
11	"Loathing"	Richard Stanley	January 10, 1996	111
Dragon tries to stop the Fiend, who feeds off hate and uses humans as hosts.
12	"Rampage"	Shari Goodhartz	December 28, 1995	112
A trio of freak bikers demand She-Dragon is handed over to them after she damages one of their bikes.
13	"Armageddon"	Henry Gilroy	January 17, 1996	113
Alex, Dragon, and She-Dragon must stop a resurrected Horde from destroying the ozone layer.

=== Season 2 (1996) ===
No.	Title	Written by	Original release date	Prod. code
14	"Bull"	Wendy Reardon	September 18, 1996	201
Mysterious robberies are being committed in high rises, and Deagon must stop them. Meanwhile, Alex falls for freak actor Raging Bull, whose series mimics Dragon's life.
15	"She-Fiend"	Bob Forward	September 25, 1996	202
The Fiend takes over She-Dragon's body.
16	"Homecoming"	Bruce Shelly; Reed Shelly	October 2, 1996	203
After discovering a picture of Dragon as a child, Alex and Dragon try to follow the lead.
17	"Loose Cannons"	Reed Shelly	October 9, 1996	204
Three freak bikers try to kill Dragon to join the Vicious Circle. Meanwhile, She-Dragon becomes a police officer after saving the mayor.
18	"Star"	Jess Winfield	October 16, 1996	205
Dragon tries to discover the identity of the mysterious Spider-Man-esque vigilante Star, who he suspects to be an egotistical rock star. Meanwhile, Alex's anti-freak Gun is stolen by Skullface.
19	"Barbarism"	Bob Forward	October 23, 1996	206
Barbaric's home is destroyed when Dragon battles the freak group Body Function, so Barbaric stays with Dragon.
20	"Ceasefire"	Henry Gilroy	October 30, 1996	207
Former members of the Vicious Circle have formed a peaceful group, and are meeting with foreign diplomats to discuss the good freaks can do, but this could be a plot made by Overlord.
21	"Endgame"	Richard Stanley	November 13, 1996	208
The Fiend uses a glowing orb to become even more powerful. With the help of an inter-dimensional traveler named the Warrior King, Alex and Dragon try to stop Fiend. Note: This episode is the second part of a crossover storyline that spanned the other shows in the USA Action Extreme Team lineup. The crossover began in an episode of Street Fighter ("The Warrior King"), and continued in Mortal Kombat: Defenders of the Realm ("Resurrection") and Wing Commander Academy ("Recreation").
22	"Negate"	Steve Cuden	November 20, 1996	209
A Freak named Negate, who has the ability to remove the powers of other Freaks, surfaces, and is targeted by Overlord, who wants him to join the Vicious Circle.
23	"Ball of Fire"	Richard Stanley	November 27, 1996	210
When a rash of bombings strikes the city, Dragon and Alex try to stop the bombers before they hit their next target: the annual police ball.
24	"Femme Fatale"	Henry Gilroy	December 4, 1996	211
Barbaric falls for a Freak woman who may be connected to the Vicious Circle.
25	"Bride"	Steve Cuden	December 11, 1996	212
Wedding bells ring for Arachnid when Openface and Octopus engineer a bride for the gluttonous monster. But she may be an even worse menace than her groom.
26	"Dragonlord"	Reed Shelly	December 18, 1996	213
Series finale. In a bizarre twist, Overlord claims that Dragon was the Overlord before him. The heroes must discover if he was telling the truth or if there is more than his claim.

== Toyline ==
To coincide with the animated series, Playmates Toys produced a toyline of five action figures featuring the Dragon, She-Dragon, and Barbaric.
