= Wing Commander Academy =

- Genre: Science fiction
- Based on: Wing Commander by Chris Roberts
- Developed by: Michael Edens; Mark Edens
- Directed by: Larry Latham
- Voices of: Mark Hamill; Tom Wilson; Malcolm McDowell; Dana Delany
- Composer: Alexander van Bubenheim
- Country of origin: United States
- Original language: English
- No. of seasons: 1
- No. of episodes: 13

Production
- Producer: Larry Latham
- Running time: 22 minutes
- Production companies: Universal Cartoon Studios; USA Studios

Original release
- Network: USA Network
- Release: September 21 – December 21, 1996

Wing Commander Academy is a 1996 American animated television series produced by Universal Cartoon Studios, along with a team led by Larry Latham. The show was based on the Wing Commander franchise and loosely served as a prequel to Wing Commander. The show's aired from September 21 to December 21, 1996, on the USA Network's "USA Action Extreme Team" block.

== Cast ==
=== Main cast ===
- Mark Hamill as Christopher 'Maverick' Blair
- Thomas F. Wilson as Todd 'Maniac' Marshall
- Malcolm McDowell as Commodore Geoffrey Tolwyn
- Dana Delany as Gwen 'Archer' Bowman

=== Additional voices ===
- Lauri Hendler as Maya McEaddens, Lindsay 'Payback' Price
- Kevin Schon as Prince Thrakhath nar Kiranka, Hector 'Grunt' Paz
- Pat Fraley as Dr. Guthrig Andropolos, Gharal nar Hhallas
- Ron Perlman as Daimon Karnes, Krulan nar Ragitagha
- Jeff Bennett as Bokh nar Ragitika
- Dorian Harewood as Jazzman
- Jessica Walter as Admiral Rhea Bergstrom
- Joan Van Ark as Dr. Bronwyn Sing
- Jim Cummings as Emil 'Easy' Zoharian
- Tom Kane as Kilrathi Pilot
- Earl Boen as Kilrathi Commander
- Jennifer Hale as Princess Zukara nar Kiranka
- Andrew Prine as Vidkun
- Michael Dorn as the Warrior King

== Spacecraft featured in the series ==
The series featured many spacecraft introduced in the Wing Commander video games. The Scimitar and Broadsword were the primary fighters and bombers flown by the main characters, with the Dralthi and Grikath fulfilling those roles for the Kilrathi. As in Wing Commander I, the TCS Tiger's Claw was a Bengal class strike carrier. Individual episodes also featured cameo appearances from ships introduced in later games such as Wing Commander III's Arrow, Hellcat and Longbow and Wing Commander IV's Avenger. None of these ships are mentioned by name. A number of new capital ships were introduced by the series including the Achilles class destroyer and the Agan Ra Sivar class dreadnaught.

== Episode list ==
No.	Title	Written by	Original release date
1	"Red and Blue"	Mark Edens and Michael Edens	September 21, 1996
Blair and Maniac are assigned to the Tiger's Claw for training.
2	"The Last One Left"	Mark Edens (story); Michael Edens (teleplay)	September 28, 1996
Maverick and Maniac are captured by Daimon Karnes, a missing legendary space fighter pilot who became disillusioned with the war and turned to piracy.
3	"The Most Delicate Instrument"	Mark Edens (story); Shari Goodhartz (teleplay)	October 5, 1996
Mentally unbalanced from stellar phenomena, four cadets begin to exhibit erratic behavior.
4	"Word of Honor"	Mark Edens (story); Richard Mueller (teleplay)	October 12, 1996
Blair and Grunt crashland on an alien world, but they're not alone...
5	"Lords of the Sky"	Mark Edens (story); Matthew Edens (teleplay)	October 19, 1996
Blair and Maniac land on an alien world where the local savages worship the dastardly "Lords of the Sky".
6	"Chain of Command"	Mark Edens (story); Brooks Wachtel (teleplay)	November 2, 1996
Tolwyn meets an old "friend", who just happens to outrank him now.
7	"Expendable"	Mark Edens (story); Ted Pedersen and Francis Moss (teleplay)	November 9, 1996
Blair and Payback scout an unstable jump node.
8	"Recreation"	Mark Edens (story); Matthew Edens (teleplay)	November 16, 1996
The crew of the Claw discovers a mysterious being in suspended animation aboard a derelict space capsule. Note: This episode is the final part of a crossover storyline that spanned the other shows in the USA Action Extreme Team lineup. The crossover began with episodes of Street Fighter ("The Warrior King"), Savage Dragon ("Endgame"), and Mortal Kombat: Defenders of the Realm ("Resurrection").
9	"Walking Wounded"	Mark Edens (story); Ralph Sanchez (teleplay)	November 23, 1996
Maniac scores guard duty on a crippled medical ship.
10	"On Both Your Houses"	Mark Edens (story); Shari Goodhartz (teleplay)	November 30, 1996
Blair, Maniac, and Archer pursue Kilrathi fighters to a lush tropical planet where things are not as they seem.
11	"Invisible Enemy"	Mark Edens (story); Richard Mueller (teleplay)	December 7, 1996
The Kilrathi have a new and terrible weapon: the Stealth Fighter.
12	"Price of Victory"	Mark Edens (story); Steve Cuden (teleplay)	December 14, 1996
Blair crashes on an ice world, where he meets an unusual Kilrathi who just happens to have an agenda...
13	"Glory of Sivar"	Mark Edens (story); Mark Edens and Michael Edens (teleplay)	December 21, 1996
Blair and Grunt land on the planet Dolos, and find themselves surrounded by fur.

== Home media ==
In March 2012, Visual Entertainment released Wing Commander Academy - The Complete Series on DVD in Region 1 for the first time. The series became available on the Peacock streaming service in July 2020.
