= Academy for New Musical Theatre =

The Academy for New Musical Theatre (ANMT) is a non-profit 501 c(3) organization dedicated to the creation and development of new musical theatre. The organization is composed of writers, composers, producers and actors who work together to create new musicals. The workshop is located in 5628 Vineland Avenue, North Hollywood, Los Angeles, California.

== History ==
ANMT was originally named The Lehman Engel Musical Theatre Workshop, and was founded by and under the direction of Lehman Engel. The Los Angeles-based workshop was an extension of the New York City-based BMI Lehman Engel Musical Theatre Workshop. In the late 1970s, the West Coast tradition of the workshop was carried on by John Sparks, Marty Hansen, and Lenning Davis. After Lehman Engel's death in 1982, John Sparks took over the role of founding artistic director. The writer's workshop remained under the name: The Lehman Engel Musical Theatre Workshop until 2002, when it became The Academy for New Musical Theatre.

Moderators include: John Sparks (Founding Artistic Director), Scott Guy (Executive Director), and Elise Dewsberry (Artistic Director, Resident Dramaturg).

Notable participants have included: Marc Hollman (Urinetown), Jeff Marx (Avenue Q), Hunter Foster (Clyde 'n Bonnie), Georgia Stitt (The Water), and Placido Domingo Jr. (Vlad).

Notable salon guests have included: Richard Sherman, Stephen Sondheim, Winnie Holzman, Jason Robert Brown, Charles Strouse, Marty Panzer, and Arthur Kopit.

== Participation in the Workshop ==
The Writer's Workshop begins with the Core Curriculum in which writers complete foundation classes, craft specific labs, and are placed on writing teams to collaborate on various assignments. At the culmination, participants write and present a 15-minute musical. After Core Curriculum, writers might be asked to enter the Full Length Curriculum, in which participants create and develop a full length musical. After Full Length, some participants are invited to become members of the General Workshop in which writers receive developmental feedback on their projects on an ongoing basis.

== Grants ==
The Academy for New Musical Theatre has received grants from the BMI Foundation, the Los Angeles County Arts Commission, the National Endowment for the Arts, Walt Disney Imagineering, and the Los Angeles Department of Cultural Affairs.

== Production history ==
"40 is the New 15" at the Noho Arts Center (2010)
"A Ring in Brooklyn" at the Noho Arts Center (2013)

== See also ==
BMI Lehman Engel Musical Theatre Workshop
