= Isshin Chiba =

Japanese voice actor

- 千葉一伸
- Born: Kazunobu Chiba; June 26, 1968 (age 58); Kesennuma, Miyagi, Japan
- Occupation: Voice actor
- Years active: 1990–present
- Agent: Arts Vision
- Notable credits: Tekken as Jin Kazama; Vampire/Darkstalkers as Jedah Dohma; Detective Conan as Kazunobu Chiba.hack//Sign as Silver Knight

Isshin Chiba (千葉 一伸, Chiba Isshin; born June 26, 1968) is a Japanese voice actor. He is best known for voicing Jin Kazama in the Tekken series.

== Biography ==
Isshin Chiba was born in Kesennuma, Miyagi, Japan. He graduated from Miyagi Prefecture Kesennuma High School. After graduating from high school, he had the idea to become a stage actor. However, because he had no experience in such extracurricular activities in particular, he attended Katsuma Voice Actor's Academy in Tokyo. He started his career as a voice actor at age 22 in 1990. In 1997, he landed the role for which he is best known, the role of Jin Kazama from the Tekken fighting game series. Starting from Tekken 3, he voiced Jin in all other Tekken games, including crossovers Namco × Capcom, Street Fighter X Tekken, Project X Zone, Project X Zone 2, The King of Fighters All Star and adaptations Tekken: Blood Vengeance, Tekken: Bloodline and the Japanese dub of the live-action Tekken film. This makes Isshin Chiba the fifth single actor playing a videogame character the longest, behind Ed Boon, who voices Scorpion from Mortal Kombat, Takenobu Mitsuyoshi who voices Kage Maru from Virtua Fighter, Shin-ichiro Miki who voices Akira Yuki from Virtua Fighter, and Joseph D. Kucan, who voices Kane from Command & Conquer.

== Filmography ==
=== Television animation ===
- Karasu Tengu Kabuto (1990) – Chiryû
- Casshan: Robot Hunter (1993) – Operator
- Science Ninja Team Gatchaman (1994) – Galactor Soldier, Submarine Operator
- Mobile Suit Gundam Wing (1995) – Soldier A, General Septum
- Sailor Moon Super S (1995) – Kitakata
- Magical Girl Pretty Sammy (1995–1997) – Chibiroku
- Detective Conan (1996) – Kazunobu Chiba
- Mysterious Theft Saint Tail (1996) – Joseph, make student, male student A & C, Police Officer, Police Officer A & B, Reporter, student A & worker B
- Great Teacher Onizuka (1999) – Ryuji Danma, Hiroshi Kochatani
- Infinite Ryvius (1999) – Stein Heiger
- s-CRY-ed (2001) – Emergy Maxfell
- Kirby of the Stars (2001–2003) – Monsieur Goan, Yamikage
- The Prince of Tennis (2001–2005) – Michael Lee
- Daigunder (2002) – Eagle Arrow, Trihorn
- Mobile Suit Gundam SEED (2002) – Arnold Neumann, Ledonir Kisaka
- .hack//SIGN (2002) – Silver Knight
- Chobits (2002) – Zima
- Transformers Micron Legend (2002) – Sandstorm, Silverbolt
- Naruto (2003) – Shiken-kan
- F-Zero Falcon Densetsu (2003) – Clash, John Tanaka, Clank Hughes
- Transformers Superlink (2004) – Sandstorm/Snowstorm, Superion
- Rockman EXE Stream (2004) – Barrel
- Samurai Champloo (2004–2005) – Ichiemon
- Law of Ueki (2005) – Grano
- Ginban Kaleidoscope (2005) – Kazuya Nitta
- Rockman EXE Beast (2005) – Barrel
- One Piece (2005–2011) – Mikazuki, Hammond, Gladius
- D.Gray-Man (2006) – 65
- Futari wa Pretty Cure Splash Star (2006) – Karehaan
- Shooting Star Rockman Tribe (2007) – Empty
- The Story of Saiunkoku (2007–2008) – Anju Ryo
- Junjou Romantica (2008) – Keiichi Sumi
- Phantom ~Requiem for the Phantom~ (2009) – Scythe Master, Giuseppe
- Bleach (2009) – Koga Kuchiki
- Beyblade: Metal Fury (2011) – Johannes
- Accel World (2012) – Araya
- Kindaichi Case Files R (2014) – Byron Lee
- Naruto Special: Battle at Hidden Falls. I am the Hero! (2015) – Shibuki
- Saint Seiya: Soul of Gold (2015) – Eikþyrnir Surt
- Gintama (2015) – Ikeda Yaemon 18th
- Attack on Titan (2018) – Roger
- Scarlet Nexus (2021) – Fubuki Spring
- Boruto: Naruto Next Generations (2022) – Batora Kuromori
- Dead Mount Death Play (2023) – Ikeuchi (ep. 14)
- Yaiba: Samurai Legend (2025) – Kagetora

=== Film ===
- Big Wars (1993) – Operator
- Detective Conan: Captured In Her Eyes (2000) – Detective Chiba
- Doraemon: Nobita and the Winged Braves (2001) – Crow Guard
- Detective Conan: Countdown to Heaven (2001) – Detective Chiba
- Rockman EXE Hikari to Yami no Program (2005) – Barrel
- Detective Conan: The Private Eyes' Requiem (2006) – Officer Chiba
- Tekken: Blood Vengeance (2011) – Jin Kazama
- Lupin the 3rd vs. Detective Conan: The Movie (2013) – Detective Chiba
- Thunderbolt Fantasy: The Sword Of Life And Death (2017) – Tie Di Xian
- The Legend of the Galactic Heroes: Die Neue These Seiran (2019) – Arthur von Streit
- Mobile Suit Gundam SEED Freedom (2024) – Arnold Neumann

=== ONA ===
- 7 Seeds (2019) – Norikazu Kagami
- Tekken: Bloodline (2022) – Jin Kazama

=== OVA ===
- Please Save My Earth (1993) – Takashi Matsudaira
- Fencer of Minerva (1994) – Harif
- Detective Conan: Conan and Heiji and the Vanished Boy (2003) – Yousuke Moriguchi

=== Video games ===
- Magical Drop II (1996) – Magician
- Street Fighter III: New Generation (1997) – Sean Matsuda
- Tekken 3 (1997) – Jin Kazama
- Vampire Savior: The Lord of Vampire (1997) – Jedah Dohma
- Street Fighter III 2nd Impact: Giant Attack (1997) – Sean Matsuda
- Rival Schools: United by Fate (1997) – Kyosuke Kagami
- Devil Summoner: Soul Hackers (1997) – Judah Singh
- Legend of Legaia (1998) – Gi Delilas
- JoJo's Bizarre Adventure (1998) – DIO
- Tekken Tag Tournament (1999) – Jin Kazama
- Breath of Fire IV (2000) – Fou-Lu, Cray
- Project Justice (2000) – Kyosuke Kagami
- Grandia II (2001) – Melfice
- Tekken 4 (2001) – Jin Kazama
- Capcom vs. SNK 2: Millionaire Fighting 2001 (2001) – Kyosuke Kagami
- Tekken Advance (2001) – Jin Kazama
- .hack//Mutation (2002) – Silver Knight
- Tales of Destiny 2 (2002) – Magnadeus
- .hack//Outbreak (2002) – Silver Knight
- Star Ocean: Till the End of Time (2003) – Albel Nox
- Nightshade (2003) – Agent
- Capcom Fighting Jam (2004) – Jedah Dohma
- Tekken 5 (2004) – Jin Kazama
- Romancing SaGa: Minstrel Song (2005) – Gray
- Namco × Capcom (2005) – Jin Kazama, Minamoto no Yoshitsune
- Fist of the North Star (2005) – Lei
- Tekken 5: Dark Resurrection (2005) - Jin Kazama
- Mermaid Prism (2006)
- Tekken 6 (2007) – Jin Kazama
- Cross Edge (2008) – Jedah Dohma
- .hack//Link (2010) – Silver Knight
- Tekken Tag Tournament 2 (2011) – Jin Kazama
- Tekken 3D: Prime Edition (2012) – Jin Kazama
- Street Fighter X Tekken (2012) – Jin Kazama
- Project X Zone (2012) – Jin Kazama, Jedah Dohma
- Tekken Revolution (2013) – Jin Kazama
- The Evil Within (2014) – Joseph Oda
- Dragon Ball Xenoverse (2015) – Time Patroller - Male 6
- Tekken 7 (2015) – Jin Kazama
- Project X Zone 2 (2015) – Jin Kazama
- Dragon Ball Xenoverse 2 (2016) – Time Patroller - Male 6
- The King of Fighters All Star (2019) – Jin Kazama
- Scarlet Nexus (2021) – Fubuki Spring
- Tekken 8 (2024) - Jin Kazama

=== Drama CD ===
- Jigoku Meguri 1: Jyou – Hideo Kirishima/Fugitive (1988)
- Saint Seiya – Sagittarius Aiolos (1997)
- Deep Fear – Mookie Carver (1998)
- Analyst no Yuutsu series 1: Benchmark ni Koi wo Shite – Yasunari Nogi (2002)
- Hisoyaka na Jounetsu Series side story 2: Iro Koi – Kouichi Takeshima (2003)
- Mossore (2003)
- Synapse no Hitsugi – Kaidou (2007)
- Ai nante Kueru ka yo (2008)
- Koi Himeyamo – Ootake (2010)
- Chikatetsu no Inu – Shinoda (2011)
- S.O.S -secret ocean story- (Ep 3) – Lawrence (2016)

=== Tokusatsu ===
- Ultraman Neos (2000) – Ultraseven 21 (eps. 2, 4, 6, 10 - 12)
- Kamen Rider Decade (2009) – Garulu (ep. 4 - 5)
- Tensou Sentai Goseiger (2010) – Matroid Zuteru-S of the Mach (ep. 35)
- Kamen Rider × Kamen Rider Fourze & OOO: Movie War Mega Max (2011) – Kamen Rider X
- Kaitou Sentai Lupinranger VS Keisatsu Sentai Patranger (2018) – Zarudan Hou (ep. 20)

=== Dubbing ===
Original year	Dub year	Title	Role	Original actor	Notes
1961	2014	West Side Story	Riff	Russ Tamblyn	
2003–2006		Teen Titans	Doctor Light	Rodger Bumpass	
2005	2008	Zathura: A Space Adventure	Adult Walter / The Astronaut	Dax Shepard	
2006		My First Wedding	Andre	Paul Hopkins	
2008–2011		Batman: The Brave and the Bold	Etrigan the Demon	Dee Bradley Baker	
2009		Tekken	Jin Kazama	Jon Foo	
2010		Reign of Assassins	Lei Bin	Shawn Yue	
2013–present		Teen Titans Go!	Trigon	Kevin Michael Richardson	
