= Hsien-Ko =

Video game and anime character

- Darkstalkers character
- Hsien-Ko in Darkstalkers Resurrection
- First game: Night Warriors: Darkstalkers' Revenge (1995)
- Created by: Haruo Murata & Noritaka Funamizu
- Designed by: Hitoshi Nishio
- Voiced by: English: Nicole Oliver (Japanese animated series); Lisa Ann Beley (animated series); Japanese: Michiko Neya (Night Warriors: Darkstalkers' Revenge, Darkstalkers 3, Super Gem Fighter Mini Mix, Namco × Capcom); Saori Hayami (UMvC3, Project X Zone); Yūko Miyamura (Japanese animated series); Kae Araki (Super Puzzle Fighter II X)

In-universe information
- Species: Jiangshi
- Origin: China
- Nationality: Chinese

Hsien-Ko, known in Japan as Lei-Lei (Japanese: レイレイ, Hepburn: Rei-Rei), is a fictional character from the Darkstalkers fighting game franchise. She was introduced in Night Warriors: Darkstalkers' Revenge in 1995. Her character is based on vampires of Chinese folklore known as jiāngshī, into which she was transformed when she was magically merged with her twin sister Mei-Ling, known in Japan as Lin-Lin (リンリン, Rin-Rin). Together, they fight to free the cursed spirit of their dead mother and to destroy the monsters preying on the people of China.

Hsien-Ko has since become one of the franchise's more popular characters, garnering positive fan and critical reception. She has also appeared on official Darkstalkers merchandise and as a playable character in several games outside the series.

== Conception and design ==
Hsien-Ko (Lei-Lei) was chiefly created by Night Warriors: Darkstalkers' Revenge planners Haruo Murata and Noritaka Funamizu and graphically designed by Hitoshi Nishio, an artist responsible for the look of the new characters in the game. It was the first time Nishio has worked on a female character. In the beginning, Funamizu envisioned two human sisters who would have fought together, in a way similar to Morrigan Aensland's "Astral Vision" special move that makes Morrigan's double appear on other side of the screen and mirror her every move. That idea was abandoned due to the problems related to programming character control problems. Murata decided a lone Hsien-Ko would be too weak as a human being, and so he came up with the jiangshi idea "but Lei-Lei can't control her powers alone, so she fights with her sister transformed into an ofuda". Nishio said: "After drawing Lei-Lei’s graphics I watched a real Chinese jiangshi movie, and I got a little worried about how Lei-Lei would be able to move around with that ofuda covering her eyes. (laughs) That was why I made Lin-Lin the ofuda".

Hsien-Ko's arsenal for her comedic "Anki Hou" special attack (throwing various projectiles including swords, daggers, axes, sledgehammers, kunai, shuriken, boomerangs, fuse bombs, chains, weights, bonsai trees, bronze statues, and Chun Li's bracelets) was created as team members would propose to add more items. According to another planner/designer, Junichi Ohno, Hsien-Ko was too strong at first and had to be balanced. Composer Takayuki Iwaim experimented with Hsien-Ko stage's background music in a way that he thought would match her character image while trying to "remove some of the 'dark' image the first game had".

== Appearances ==
According to her Night Warriors: Darkstalkers' Revenge backstory, Hsien-Ko and her twin sister, Mei-Ling, were born in 1730s China (Qing dynasty). During a time when undead spirits arose and attacked a rural village, their mother was killed in her attempt to save the village, the twins, fought to release her soul from the dark by using a forbidden spell called "Igyo Tenshin no Jutsu". This, in turn, converted them into a jiāngshī ("hopping corpse"), a type of Chinese zombie. Mei-Ling is actually the fú ("ward-paper"), a parchment-like talisman that is attached to the front of Hsien-Ko's hat. While the conversion infused Hsien-Ko with magical powers, they are formidable enough that Mei-Ling's presence as the ward-paper is required to keep them in check. The twins' transformation results in them fighting as a Darkhunter as a combined single unit of mind and body. In Hsien-Ko's Darkstalkers' Revenge ending, the girls free their mother's soul, albeit at the cost of their own lives, but their mother, as a reward, enables them to be reborn as infants in a new life. In Hsien-Ko's Darkstalkers 3 storyline, which makes no mention of the twins' mother, they discover that they are connected psychically after experiencing the same dream on the night of their sixteenth birthday, but the very next night they both suffer a nightmare and fall into a coma, which in turn sees their collective consciousness transported into Majigen. After awakening in this foreign territory, they find they have gained new powers simply from unleashing the power of an unspecified forbidden spell and team up to fight their way out of the realm.

Hsien-Ko has made several other appearances in crossover titles. She appears as a playable character in Namco × Capcom, and is paired with Fong Ling from Resident Evil: Dead Aim as a single unit, while in Project X Zone she is paired up with Frank West from Dead Rising. Hsien-Ko is also playable in Super Gem Fighter Mini Mix, SNK vs. Capcom: Card Fighters Clash, SNK vs. Capcom: Card Fighters 2 Expand Edition, SNK vs. Capcom: Card Fighters DS, Marvel vs. Capcom 3: Fate of Two Worlds (where Hsien-Ko and Mei-Ling arrive to ask Doctor Strange to help them save their mother's soul), Ultimate Marvel vs. Capcom 3, Onimusha Soul (redesigned for a feudal Japan setting), and Street Fighter: Puzzle Spirits.

Hsien-Ko has her own mobile game, Lei-Lei's Magical Hammer, released in the West simply as Magical Hammer and later remade as Line Drop: Spirit Hunter Lei-Lei. She was originally planned to be playable in Tatsunoko vs. Capcom, but was dropped due to time constraints. She has also made cameo appearances: in some versions of Marvel Super Heroes where she can be summoned by Anita; in Capcom vs. SNK 2 as a restaurant patron in the Shanghai stage; in Street Fighter Alpha 2 as one of the party guests, along with her sister, in Ken's stage; and in Zombie Cafe in a guest appearance. Her guest appearances in collaboration events within assorted mobile games have included The Knights of Avalon and The Samurai Kingdom.

Hsien-Ko and Mei-Ling make their first appearance in the second episode of the 1997 anime miniseries Night Warriors: Darkstalkers' Revenge. The twins travel Earth in an old T-bucket-style convertible with a trailer resembling a covered wagon attached. Their personalities, and speech patterns in the English dub of the program, differed considerably; Mei-Ling is the more sensible of the pair and speaks eloquently, whereas Hsien-Ko has a more childlike disposition, and her dialogue often contains modern colloquialisms or improper grammar (often saying "don't" in place of "doesn't"). She also appears in the 1995 American cartoon series that is loosely based on the games (in the episodes "Ghost Hunter" and "Darkest Before Dawn"), where Hsien-Ko's backstory was altered like those of several characters, in her case her transformation having resulted from her accidentally consuming a substance she mistook for rice that was hidden under a floorboard inside a hut. The character appears in other Darkstalkers media, such as the comic and manga adaptations of Night Warriors: Darkstalkers' Revenge by Run Ishida; and Itou Mami's Maleficarum, as well as in the 2004 card game Universal Fighting System by Jasco Games.

=== Gameplay ===
In the games, most of Hsien-Ko's powers "involve floating on air and pulling an impossibly huge collection of deadly items out of their sleeves". According to Sega Saturn Magazine, unlike the other Darkstalkers characters, Hsien-Ko "is a mostly defensive character and hence spends most of the game blocking attacks and storing special gauges. She is excellent for countering moves and combos and a number of projectile attacks give her the edge in long range attacks". She is one of the characters that can dash past an opponent and get behind them. Though Mei-Ling has never been a playable character in any of the games, a special move in Darkstalkers 3 involves her coming out to team up with Hsien-Ko.

A cheat code in Super Puzzle Fighter II Turbo, where Hsien-Ko and the other characters appear in a super-deformed state, allows access to Mei-Ling as a playable. According to GamesRadar, the Marvel vs. Capcom 3: Fate of Two Worlds version of Hsien-Ko (an unlockable character capable of interacting with Chris Redfield) is "an extremely unorthodox character with a number of strange moves and weird mobility". She was judged not good for beginners as her "weird normal attacks and bizarre movement options" and attacks are likely to confuse new players. The DLC Evil Twin Costume Pack includes Mei-Ling as an alternate skin for Hsien-Ko's model in Ultimate Marvel vs. Capcom 3.

== Promotion and reception ==
Multiple Hsien-Ko figures and resin garage kits were released by various manufacturers, including FuRyu, among others. Capcom produced Hsien-Ko T-shirts and Banpresto released a series of mascot key chains.

Ian Walker in an article for A.V. Club considered Hsien-Ko alongside her sister to be two of the creepiest characters in fighting games, and of the Darkstalkers series as a whole, citing the body horror of their transformation into a jiangshi and ward respectively. He further felt their storyline between Night Warriors and Vampire Savior indicated that they were destined to fight against monsters at all time, stating "Never knowing when you’ll be ripped from your happy life to hunt down werewolves and vampires must certainly be an unsettling feeling." Tom Goulter of GamesRadar+ meanwhile saw her addition as the series begin to tap into non-Western horror iconography, and called her "scary but also sort of hilarious" and a "highly tactical fighter".

Diamond Feit for Retronauts' podcast described her as an "instant fan favorite", citing her large sleeves, "twitchy movements", and dash in which she vanishes as standout features. Co-host Ant Cooke called her one of his favorite designs, stating that it felt like Capcom had a lot of fun designing. Feit pointed out that while she was still sexualized in the title with her emphasized cleavage, she wasn't "as bouncy" as the other two female characters in the series at that time, Felicia and Morrigan Aensland, with the 'bounce' being emphasized in her outfit itself instead.

The staff of Gamest magazine in their Gals Island series of publications stated that much of her appeal came from her character design, citing her lose clothes, movements, and voice lines. However, they felt most of her charm came from how eccentric a character she was, especially in a franchise that already featured many unconventional characters. They felt players were often surprised by many of her attacks, and despite being a difficult character to control learning how to use her effectively helped many like her. They additionally cited the presence of her sister, considering their role as a dual character another standout aspect where both were equally well received.

Other articles in the Gals Island series cited her as part of a growing trend of Chinese character design in Japanese video games, particularly in Capcom titles. They also expressed that Hsien-Ko had a rather tragic destiny, yet despite it she lived at her own pace, and saw her as having a strong will in opposition of her own fate. Meanwhile, she was also featured in Monthly Arcadia's own Gals Island series of articles, where they discussed the sisters' storyline hoped the pair could have a happy outcome. Artist Kotomi Tohashi additionally praised Hsien-Ko's design as cute despite being a jiangshi, particularly praising how her standing animation made her neck appear to be broken as it jittered.

Japanese singer and voice actress Reina Kondō used Lei-Lei as her nickname. The Skullgirls character Peacock's utilized attacks that reference Hsien-Ko, and the game's first prototype around 1999 actually used her and Chun-Li sprites for testing.
