= Yayoi Jinguji =

Japanese voice actress (1965–2017)

- 神宮司 弥生
- Born: Yayoi Fujimoto (藤本 弥生); December 8, 1965; Hyōgo Prefecture, Japan
- Died: December 17, 2017 (aged 52)
- Occupation: Voice actress
- Years active: 1989–2017
- Agent: Arts Vision
- Website: Official profile

Yayoi Fujimoto (藤本 弥生, Fujimoto Yayoi; December 8, 1965 – December 17, 2017), better known by the stage name Yayoi Jinguji (神宮司 弥生, Jingūji Yayoi), was a Japanese voice actress from Hyōgo Prefecture, Japan. She played Morrigan Aensland in the Darkstalkers video games, and Great Fairy, Koume and Kotake in The Legend of Zelda series. She was affiliated with Arts Vision.

== Filmography ==
=== Anime ===
1998

- Yoshimotomuchiko Monogatari (Hanaka Mariki Momoko)

1999

- Ai no Wakakusayama Monogatari (Shizuka Kawamura)
- Oruchuban Ebichu (Naoto and others)
- Komu-chan gaiku!! (Mr. Izawa and others)

=== OVA ===
1989

- Megazone 23 - Part III - The Awakening of Eve (Jacob's secretary, operator)

1991

- Makyū Senjō 2 (operator A)

1993

- BADBOYS (mother)

1997

- Konpeki no kantai tokubetsu-hen sōrai kaihatsu monogatari (Nakai)

=== Video games ===
1994

- Advanced V.G. (Miranda Jahana)
- Vampire: The Night Warriors (Morrigan Aensland)

1995

- Vampire Hunter: Darkstalkers' Revenge (Morrigan Aensland)
- Tozasarata Tachi (Tess Conway)
- Super Puzzle Fighter II X (Morrigan Aensland, Devilot)
- Dungeons & Dragons: Shadow over Mystara (Thief)
- Fire Woman Matoigumi (Aiko Aoyama)

1997

- Vampire Savior: The Lord of Vampire (Morrigan Aensland)
- Vampire Savior: The Lord of Vampire 2 (Morrigan Aensland)
- Vampire Hunter 2: Darkstalkers' Revenge (Morrigan Aensland)
- Doki Doki Shutter Chance (Reiko Kisaragi)
- Harmful Park (Cassis)
- Princess Maker: Yumemiru Yousei (Medina & Kurubou)
- Pocket Fighter (Morrigan Aensland)

1998

- The Legend of Zelda: Ocarina of Time (Nabooru, Great Fairy, Koume, Kotake)
- Farland Saga: Toki no Michishirube (Sofia)
- Marvel vs.Capcom: Clash of Super Heroes (Morrigan Aensland, Ton Pooh)
- Marl Oukoku no Ningyou Hime (Gao)

1999

- Sengoku Bishōjo Emaki Kūwokiru!! Harukaze no Shō (Rasha)
- Little Princess: Marl Ōkoku no Ningyō Hime 2 (Gao)

2000

- Capcom vs. SNK: Millennium Fight 2000 (Morrigan Aensland)
- The Legend of Zelda: Majora's Mask (Great Fairy, Koume, Kotake)
- Marvel vs.Capcom 2: New Age of Heroes (Morrigan Aensland)

2001

- Capcom vs. SNK: Millennium Fight 2000 PRO (Morrigan Aensland)
- Capcom vs. SNK 2: Millionaire Fighting 2001 (Morrigan Aensland)
- Legaia 2: Duel Saga (Sharon)

2005

- Namco × Capcom (Morrigan Aensland)

2008

- Cross Edge (Morrigan Aensland)
- Tatsunoko vs. Capcom (Morrigan Aensland)

2011

- The Legend of Zelda: Ocarina of Time 3D (Nabooru, Great Fairy, Koume, Kotake)

2012

- Monster Hunter Frontier Online (Hunter female voice - TYPE 29)

2014

- Super Smash Bros. for Nintendo 3DS / Wii U (Koume, Kotake)

2015

- The Legend of Zelda: Majora's Mask 3D (Great Fairy, Koume, Kotake)

2018

- Super Smash Bros. Ultimate (Koume, Kotake - voice archive)

=== Dubbing ===
==== Foreign Movies ====
- Cannonball 3 Atarashiki Chōsenshatachi (Heather Scott <Mimi · Cajik>)

=== Drama CD ===
- Hokuō Shinwa Densetsu series (Frigg)

1991

- Jubei Kurenai (Imaizumi Yuzue)

1995

- Shōnen Nure Yasuku Koi Nari Gatashi (Nobuko)

1996

- Shōnen Nure Yasuku Koi Nari Gatashi 2 - Samayoeru Meikyū - (tutor of son, woman of black list)

1997

- Kindaichi Shōnen no Jikenbo Shinigami Byōin Satsujin Jiken (Kazuko Takazawa)
