= Kae Araki =

Japanese voice actress (born 1963)

- 荒木 香衣
- Born: November 6, 1963 (age 62); Osaka, Japan
- Occupation: Voice actress
- Years active: 1986–present
- Notable credits: Fushigi Yûgi as Miaka Yūki; Sailor Moon as Chibiusa; Darkstalkers as Felicia; Digimon Adventure as Hikari Yagami

Kae Araki (荒木 香衣(old stage name,荒木 香恵), Araki Kae; born November 6, 1963) is a Japanese voice actress from Osaka, Japan. After standing in for Kotono Mitsuishi, the voice of Usagi Tsukino in the series Sailor Moon, when she was undergoing surgery for an ovarian cyst, Araki was given the role of Chibiusa in the same series. While training at a voice acting school, Araki acted as senpai to fellow voice actress Konami Yoshida, and they have since maintained a close relationship.

== Early life ==
She was born in Osaka Prefecture. She moved to Hokkaido in second grade, to Kagawa Prefecture in the third grade, and Kadoma in Osaka and Tomakomai in Hokkaido in the fourth grade. Due to the work of her father, she moved seven times before graduating from high school.

Since childhood, she longed for the theater world due to the influence of television. She didn't want to be the main actress and just wanted to play. She decided to follow the theatrical path in the fall of the third year of high school.

== Career ==
After finishing high school in Hokkaido, she moved to Tokyo to become a stage actress. She entered the training school of the Tokyo Actor's Consumer's Cooperative Society (Haikyō) and enrolled in the acting department for half a year. She joined the theater company because she could not get into the upper class on the advanced exam. Her voice work began after she was discovered by a voice actor's office manager who saw Araki on stage. Her first anime work was Maison Ikkoku. After that, Araki affiliated with Ken Production. Instead of voice work, the NHK reporter and scene moderators focused mainly on face-to-face work. She then transferred to Arts Vision, where animation was the main focus.

In 1993, she played the main character Usagi Tsukino in the Sailor Moon anime series, for 7 episodes replacing Kotono Mitsuishi who was hospitalized. The schedule required a substitute and Araki was selected. Later, in the sequel to the series, she played Sailor Chibi Moon. Her role was decided without an audition. In 1995, she played Miaka Yūki in Fushigi Yûgi, her first leading role in television animation.

She was affiliated with 81 Produce from August 2003 to May 2010 and is currently freelancing.

In 2019 Kae Araki was featured in the major Bandai "Proplica" release of Sailor Chibi Moon's transformation compact.

== Filmography ==
=== Anime ===
==== Television ====
- Mobile Suit Gundam 0083: Stardust Memory (1991–1992) as Jacqueline Simone
- Mischievous Twins: The Tales of St. Clare's (1991) as Sheila Neira
- Armored Police Metal Jack (1991) as Sayuri Kamizaki
- Chikyū SOS Sore Ike Kororin (1992) as Ozon Eko
- Sailor Moon (1992–1997) as Usagi Tsukino (eps. 44–50), Chibiusa
- YAWARA! Special: Zutto Kimi no Koto ga… (1992) as Marusō
- Tama of 3rd Street: Do You Know My Tama? (1993) as Koma
- Little Women II: Jo's Boys (1993) as Daisy
- Mobile Suit Victory Gundam (1993) as Peggy Lee
- Mobile Fighter G Gundam (1994) as Cath Ronary
- Bonobono (1995) as Chirabi-chan
- Gunsmith Cats (1995–1996) as "Minnie" May Hopkins
- Fushigi Yûgi (1995) as Miaka Yūki
- Mobile Suit Gundam Wing (1995) as Hilde Schbeiker, Schoolgirl G
- Fushigi Yûgi (1996–2002) series as Miaka Yūki
- Remi, Nobody's Girl (1996) as Maria
- Mysterious Thieft Saint Tail (1996) as Sayaka
- Kodocha (1996–1998) as Shizu
- Flame of Recca (1997) as Yōko
- Gestalt (1997) as Ōri
- Pocket Monsters (1997) as Natsume (Sabrina)
- Slayers Try (1997) as Anna
- Cardcaptor Sakura (1998–2000) as Akane
- Let's Nupu Nupu (1998) as Hamster / Kyouzame-chan / Mari-chan
- Super Radical Gag Family (1998) as Noriko Nishikawa
- Bomberman B-Daman Bakugaiden V (1999) as Mermaid Bon
- Corrector Yui (1999–2000) as Ai Shinozaki
- Digimon Adventure (1999) as Hikari Yagami
- Great Teacher Onizuka (1999–2000) as Nagisa Nagase
- Iketeru Futari (1999) as Akira Koizumi
- Medabots (1999) as Nadako
- Monster Rancher (1999) as Michelle
- Shin Hakkenden (1999) as Tamazusa
- Ceres, Celestial Legend (2000) as Shōta Kurima
- Digimon Adventure 02 (2000) as Hikari Yagami
- Hand Maid May (2000) as Chigusa Tani
- Doki Doki♡Densetsu Mahōjin Guru Guru (2000) as Juju Kū Shunamuru
- Go! Go! Itsutsugo Land (2001) as Kodama Morino
- Digimon Frontier (2002) as Patamon
- Hungry Heart Wild Striker (2002-2003) as Kaori Doumoto
- Mirmo! (2002) as Otome, Marina
- RahXephon (2002) as Cathy McMahon
- Ashita no Nadja (2003) as Simone Monterran
- Gilgamesh (2003) as Reiko Yushiro
- Zoids: Fuzors (2003) as Rebecca
- Guardian Hearts (2003) as Maya Ōba
- Yu-Gi-Oh! Duel Monsters GX (2004–2008) as Maiden of the Aqua
- Guardian Hearts: Power Up! (2005) as Maya Ōba
- Love Com (2007) as Mimi Yoshioka

==== Film ====
- Mobile Suit Gundam 0083: The Last Blitz of Zeon (1992) as Jacqueline Simone
- I Can Hear the Sea (1993) – Yumi Kohama
- Pretty Soldier Sailor Moon R The Movie (1993) – Chibiusa
- Pretty Soldier Sailor Moon S The Movie (1994) – Chibiusa
- Pretty Soldier Sailor Moon SuperS: The Nine Sailor Soldiers Unite! Miracle of the Black Dream Hole (1995) – Chibiusa
- Digimon Adventure (1999) – Hikari Yagami

=== Video games ===
- Super Robot Wars series as Kukuru, Jacqueline Simone, Hilde Schubeiker
- Variable Geo series – Manami Kusunoki
- Vampire: The Night Warriors (1994) as Felicia, Snowmen
- Cyberbots: Full Metal Madness (1995) as Mao
- Megami Paradise (1995) as Maharaja
- Sailor Moon: Another Story (1995) as Chibiusa
- Vampire Hunter: Darkstalkers' Revenge (1995) as Felicia, Snowmen
- Fūun Gokū Ninden (1996) as Sanzō
- Megami Paradise II (1996) as Maharaja
- Riglord Saga 2 (1996) as Female Thief Shiranami
- Super Puzzle Fighter II X (1996) as Felicia, Hsien-Ko
- Alnam no Tsubasa (1997) as Kureha
- Metal Angel 3 (1997) as Kumi Kochō, Isabella Iceberg
- Pocket Fighter (1997) as Felicia, Lilith, Announcer
- Tilk: Aoi Umi kara Kita Shōjo (1997)
- Vampire Savior: The Lord of Vampire (1997) as Felicia
- Kindaichi Shōnen no Jikenbo 2: Jigoku Yūenchi Satsujin Jiken (1998) as Kayo Minamoto
- Next King: Koi no Sennen Ōkoku (1998) as Ginger Bībām
- Prism Court (1998) as Akari Okajima
- Valkyrie Profile: Lenneth (1999) as Jelanda
- Marvel vs. Capcom 2: New Age of Heroes (2000) as Felicia
- Baten Kaitos: Eternal Wings and the Lost Ocean (2003) as Lady Melodia
- Mobile Suit Gundam: Meguri Ai Uchū (2003) as Jacqueline Simone, Riria Furōbēru
- Star Ocean 3: Till the End of Time (2003) as Freya
- Capcom Fighting Jam (2004) as Felicia
- Cross Edge (2004) as Felicia
- Namco × Capcom (2005) as Felicia, Fong Ling
- Tales of the Tempest (2006) as Arria Ekberg
- Samurai Shodown: Edge of Destiny (2009) as Suzuhime
- Solatorobo: Red The Hunter (2010) as Nero
- GUNbare! Game Tengoku (2017) as Sakura

=== Dubbing ===
Original year	Dub year	Title	Role	Original actor	Notes
		Jōnetsu no Meisō	Natalie		
		Taiketsu Spellbinder	Ben		
		Amitie			CD drama
1983–1987		Fraggle Rock	Red Fraggle		
1989–1991		Babar	Flora	Lisa Yamanaka, Lea-Helen Weir	
1991		CD Theater: Dragon Quest	Poppy		CD drama
1993–2000		Boy Meets World	Morgan Matthews	Lily Nicksay	
1994–1995		Blossom	Kennedy	Courtney Chase	
1997		AIKa: Little Trigger Girl	Felnand Mizusumashi		CD drama
1999–2009		Ed, Edd n Eddy	Sarah	Janyse Jaud	
2007–2010		The Tudors	Catherine of Aragon, Anne of Cleves, Catherine Parr	Maria Doyle Kennedy, Joss Stone, Joely Richardson	
2001–present		Totally Spies!	Phoebe Simpson		
1992–1995		Batman: The Animated Series	Baby-Doll	Alison La Placa	
1997–1999		The New Batman Adventures	Baby-Doll	Laraine Newman	
2003		Ouran High School Host Club	Ayanokōji		CD drama

== Notes ==
- ロマンアルバム 声優ヒストリー SAY YOU HISTORY. Tokuma Shoten. 1997. ISBN 4-19-720015-3.
