= Marvel vs. Capcom 3: Fate of Two Worlds =

Crossover fighting video game

- North American and European cover art, designed by Adi Granov
- Developers: Capcom; Eighting
- Publisher: Capcom
- Director: Go Usuma
- Producer: Ryota Niitsuma
- Artist: Hiroyuki Nara
- Composer: Hideyuki Fukasawa
- Series: Marvel vs. Capcom
- Engine: MT Framework
- Platforms: PlayStation 3 Xbox 360
- Release: NA: February 15, 2011; JP: February 17, 2011; EU: February 18, 2011
- Genre: Fighting
- Modes: Single-player, multiplayer

Marvel vs. Capcom 3: Fate of Two Worlds (Note: Japanese: マーヴル VS. カプコン 3 フェイト オブ トゥー ワールド, Hepburn: Māvuru bāsasu Kapukon Surī: Feito obu Tū Wārudo) is a 2011 crossover fighting game developed by Capcom and Eighting and published by Capcom. It is the sequel to Marvel vs. Capcom 2: New Age of Heroes (2000) as the fifth installment of the Marvel vs. Capcom franchise — which features characters from both Capcom's video game franchises and comic book series published by Marvel Comics — and the first to use three-dimensional character models instead of two-dimensional sprites. The game was released for the PlayStation 3 and Xbox 360 consoles in February 2011.

In Marvel vs. Capcom 3, players select a team of three characters to engage in combat and attempt to knock out their opponents. It features similar tag team game mechanics to earlier games in the series, along with new methods of play designed to make the game more accessible to new players. The game was produced by Ryota Niitsuma, who had previously worked on Tatsunoko vs. Capcom, which utilizes the same simplified three-button attack system.

The game received generally positive reviews from critics, who praised its gameplay and character roster, while criticizing its online component and lack of features and game modes. More than 2 million units were shipped worldwide a month after its debut, rendering it a commercial success. Less than a year after its release, Capcom announced an updated version of the game, titled Ultimate Marvel vs. Capcom 3. The standalone update was released in November 2011, and featured additional characters, stages, and gameplay tweaks. Combined sales of both versions exceed 4 million copies. A proper sequel, titled Marvel vs. Capcom: Infinite, was released in September 2017.

== Gameplay ==
Deadpool battles Ryu on the Kattelox Island stage. Here, Deadpool activates his X-Factor, granting him and his team increased damage, speed, and health regeneration.

Marvel vs. Capcom 3: Fate of Two Worlds is a fighting game in which players compete in battle using characters with different fighting styles and special attacks. The game features tag team-based gameplay similar to previous installments of the series. Players select teams of three characters to engage in one-on-one combat, and can choose to switch between them at any point during the match. During combat, players can call in one of their off-screen characters to perform a single special move, known as an "assist". As characters deal or receive damage, their team's "Hyper Combo Gauge" will gradually fill with energy, which can be expended by players to execute certain techniques, such as hyper combos, which are stronger versions of special moves; "snapbacks", which force the current opponent off the screen and replaces them with one of their other teammates; and "crossover combinations", which summon the player's entire team to use their hyper combos all at once. Players must use the various attacks in their arsenal to exhaust their opponent's life gauge and defeat the entire enemy team, or have the most cumulative health when time runs out. Marvel vs. Capcom 3 is the first entry in the franchise to feature three-dimensional character models as opposed to two-dimensional sprites. However, gameplay remains restricted to two dimensions, resulting in a 2.5D graphical design.

Unlike Marvel vs. Capcom 2: New Age of Heroes, which featured four attack buttons separated as two pairs of low and high-strength punches and kicks, Marvel vs. Capcom 3 uses a simplified, three-button control scheme of undefined light, medium, and heavy attacks modeled after Tatsunoko vs. Capcom, which aims to "knock down the wall of complicated controls and open up the field of strategic fighting to all comers". The game includes a new "exchange button", which is used to launch opponents into the air, swap characters while performing combos, and slam the opponent into the ground. Players can use each button to string together attacks and form combos, as well as perform special moves using a combination of button presses and joystick movements. Marvel vs. Capcom 3 also features an alternate control scheme designed for players unfamiliar to fighting games called "Simple Mode". Simple Mode allows players to perform special moves and hyper combos with single button presses at the expense of limiting a character's available moveset.

Marvel vs. Capcom 3 introduces a new game mechanic known as "X-Factor", which offers increased damage, speed, and health regeneration for a short period of time. It can be activated by players once per match, and can also be used to extend combos. The duration and intensity of X-Factor is dependent on the number of active characters in the player's team; as a player loses fighters, X-Factor lasts longer and grants higher damage boosts.

=== Modes ===
Marvel vs. Capcom 3 features various offline game modes, such as Arcade Mode, where the player fights against AI-controlled opponents to reach the final boss character, Galactus, a supervillain from Marvel Comics' Fantastic Four series. Each character has their own unique ending sequence, which is earned upon completion of Arcade Mode. Other offline modes include Versus Mode, where two players can fight against each other locally; Training Mode, which features several customization options for training purposes, such as the ability to adjust the Hyper Combo gauge, set AI difficulty, record and playback moves, and even simulate input lag; and Mission Mode, which features character-specific challenges designed to test players on their ability to execute complex combos.

Marvel vs. Capcom 3 includes online play using Microsoft's Xbox Live and Sony's PlayStation Network services. Online multiplayer includes ranked matches, where players battle to increase their rank and ascend the game's leaderboards; player matches, which do not bestow rank and offer options for quick rematches; and player lobbies, which allow up to eight players in a single room to compete in a king of the hill-style format. When an online match begins, both players can view their opponent's License Card. License Cards keep track of players' tendencies based on fighting style, record player points and total number of wins and losses, and allow players to see the positive and negative points of their play styles. Included among the online features is Shadow Battle, a series of downloadable content packs that allow the player to fight against a team of AI-controlled opponents programmed after the techniques and preferences of Capcom's development staff and famous players from the fighting game community.

=== Playable characters ===
Marvel vs. Capcom 3: Fate of Two Worlds contains a base roster of 36 characters, featuring both new and returning characters to the Marvel vs. Capcom franchise. Two additional characters, Jill Valentine and Shuma-Gorath, are also available as downloadable content. According to producer Niitsuma, character selection was a collaborative process between Capcom and Marvel Comics. Marvel gave Niitsuma and his team precise directions regarding the Marvel characters' designs, but was willing to leave game balancing to Capcom. In regards to characters who did not originate from fighting games, such as Deadpool and Arthur, Niitsuma's team tried to "preserve their essence" from their source material and see how they could siphon them into interesting fighting game characters.

Marvel worked closely with Capcom to include dialogue quips and mid-match events between the companies' characters. Comic book writer Frank Tieri was assigned to write the character dialogue and endings for the game. Marvel also gave Tieri full use of their library of characters for storyline purposes. As a result, several unplayable characters from the Marvel and Capcom universes, such as the Fantastic Four, Ghost Rider, Daredevil, MegaMan Volnutt, Nemesis, and Phoenix Wright, make cameo appearances in the campaign stages and Arcade Mode endings.

Characters new to the franchise are bolded.

==== Marvel characters ====
- Captain America
- **Deadpool**
- Doctor Doom
- **Dormammu**
- Hulk
- Iron Man
- Magneto
- **MODOK**
- **Phoenix**
- Sentinel
- **She-Hulk**
- Shuma-Gorath (Note: Formerly available as downloadable content.)
- Spider-Man
- Storm
- **Super-Skrull**
- **Taskmaster**
- **Thor Odinson**
- Wolverine
- **X-23**

==== Capcom characters ====
- Akuma
- **Albert Wesker**
- **Amaterasu**
- **Arthur**
- **Chris Redfield**
- Chun-Li
- **Crimson Viper**
- **Dante**
- Felicia
- **Hsien-Ko**
- Jill Valentine
- **Mike Haggar**
- Morrigan Aensland
- **Nathan "Rad" Spencer**
- Ryu
- **Trish**
- Tron Bonne
- **Viewtiful Joe**
- **Zero**

== Development ==
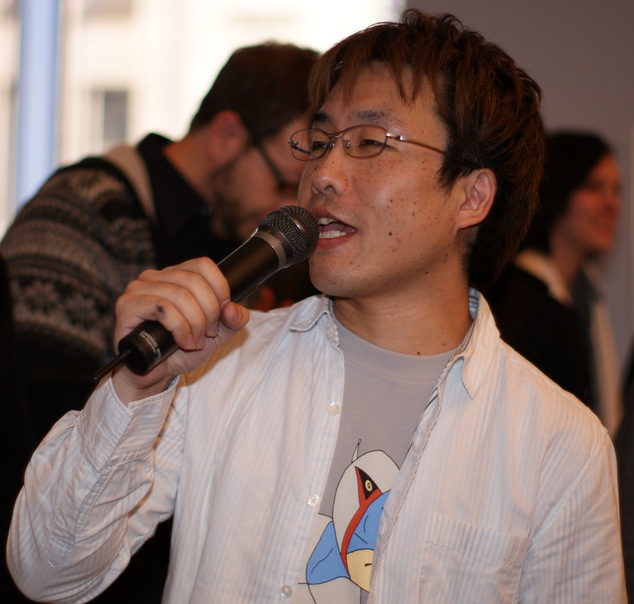
Ryota Niitsuma, whose previous work includes Street Fighter IV and Tatsunoko vs. Capcom, served as the game's producer.

Marvel vs. Capcom 3: Fate of Two Worlds is the fifth installment in the Marvel vs. Capcom series. The game was first publicly announced at Capcom's Captivate press show in Hawaii on April 20, 2010. It was revealed to have been in development since 2008, when Capcom reacquired the Marvel license after a period of legal issues placed the series on hiatus for nearly a decade. Ryota Niitsuma, who had previously headed production on Tatsunoko vs. Capcom, signed on as the producer for the new project, which was green-lit after "years and years of unrelenting fan demand". Niitsuma stated that the game was built using the same MT Framework game engine seen in Resident Evil 5 and Lost Planet 2.

Capcom's design philosophy for Marvel vs. Capcom 3 was to maximize gameplay depth and minimize complexity. According to Niitsuma, the development team sought to create a game that would reach out to longtime fans of the series, while simultaneously expanding their user base to those familiar with the characters, but perhaps not with fighting games in general. The urge to reach out to new players also stemmed from Marvel's recent success in the Hollywood film industry. Capcom's global head of production, Keiji Inafune, expressed interest in appealing to a worldwide audience. These ideas drove the decision to retool the fighting system, which was criticized in past iterations for being too complicated for casual players. These changes include the implementation of the three-button attack system from Tatsunoko vs. Capcom and the addition of Simple Mode. Unlike previous titles in the series, Capcom had no plans for an arcade release, and focused only on console versions for the PlayStation 3 and Xbox 360. When asked if Capcom was planning to release the game on other consoles, Niitsuma did not dismiss the possibility for a Nintendo Wii version; however, this ultimately did not come to fruition.

Employees from Marvel Comics worked closely with Capcom's art design team to ensure that each character from their company was properly represented. As a result, several Marvel characters were modeled after their more recent comic book appearances. For example, Iron Man sports his Extremis Armor, while Wolverine wears his John Cassaday-designed costume from Astonishing X-Men. The development team originally planned to have English and Japanese voice actors for all characters. Niitsuma eventually decided against it, stating that having the Marvel roster speaking Japanese did not mesh well with the characters' image.

== Release ==
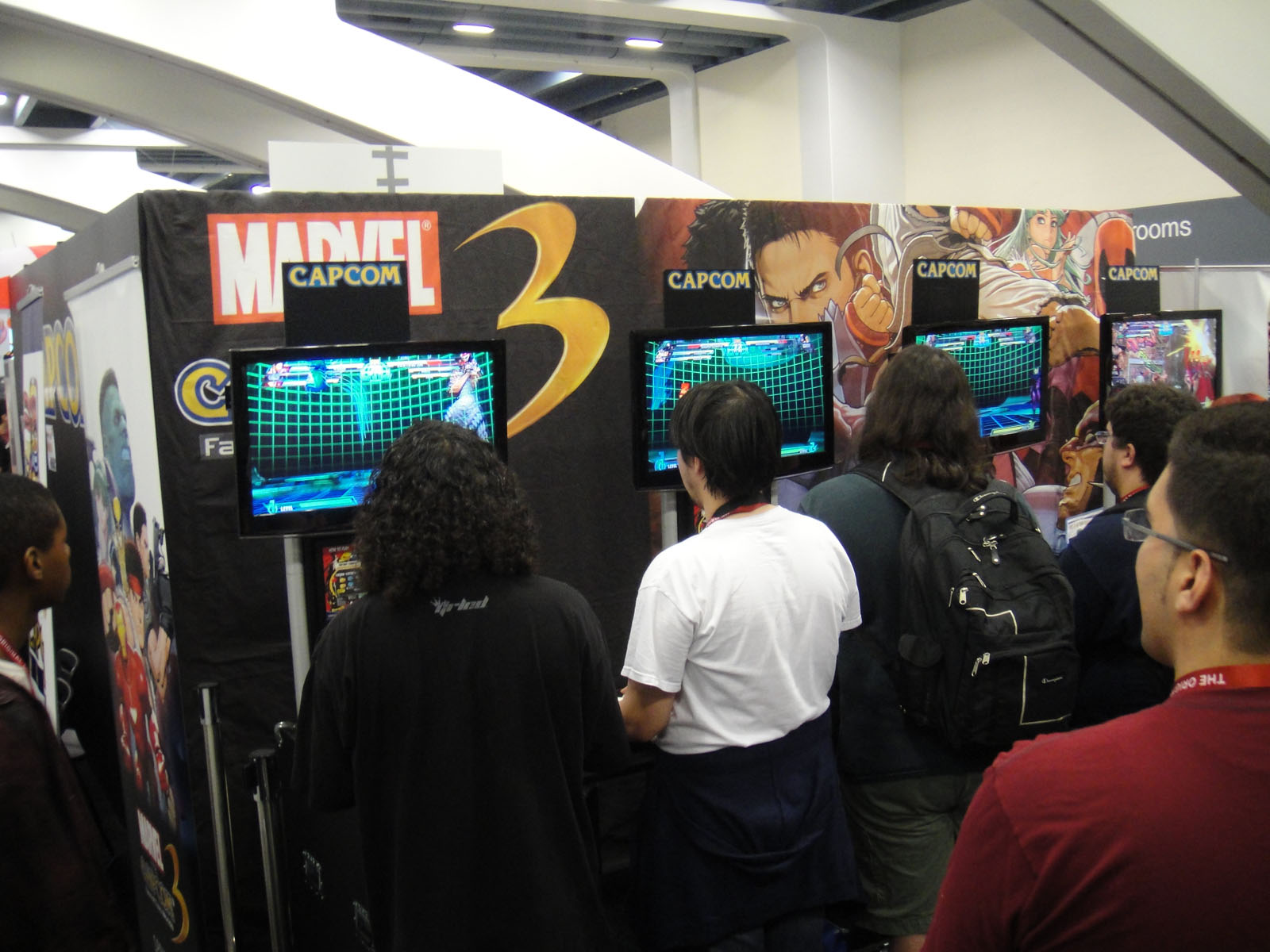
Demos of the game at WonderCon 2011

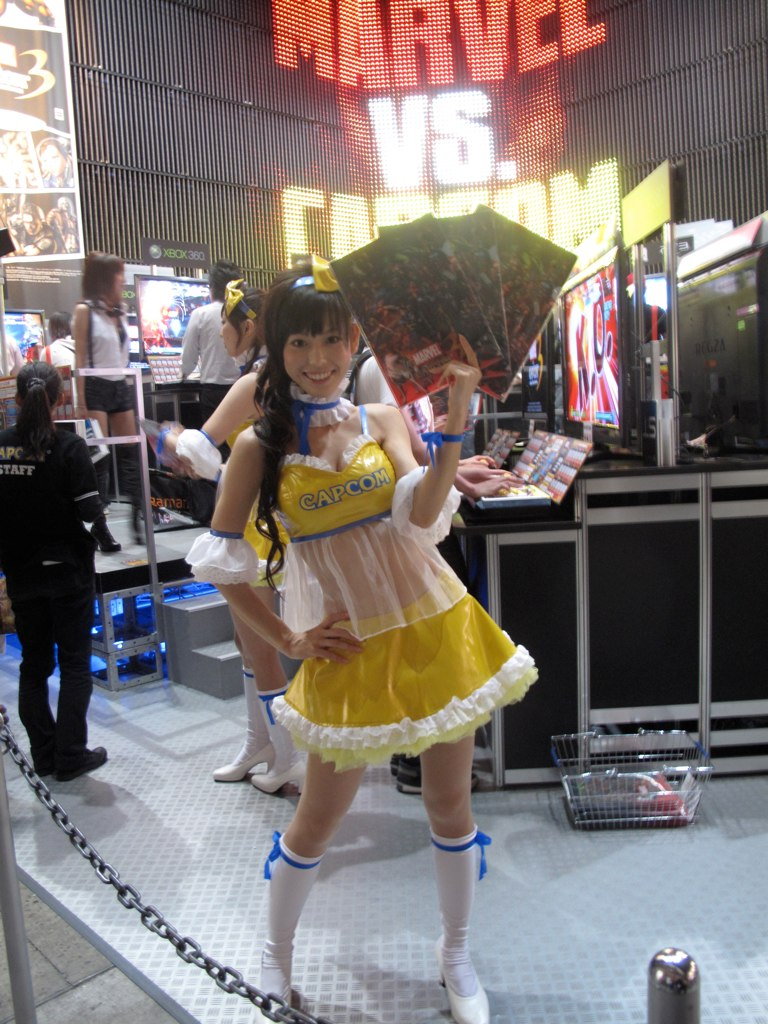
Pre-release promotion at Tokyo Game Show 2010

Marvel vs. Capcom 3: Fate of Two Worlds was released on February 15, 2011, in North America, February 17 in Japan, and February 18 in Europe for the PlayStation 3 and Xbox 360. A special edition of the game included a steelbook case, a twelve-page prologue comic written by Frank Tieri, a one-month subscription to Marvel Digital Comics, and codes redeemable for free downloads of the Jill Valentine and Shuma-Gorath downloadable content.

DLC costumes for characters were later announced by Capcom and Marvel, which were released on the PlayStation Network and Xbox Live Marketplace on March 1, 2011. The costume pack contained new outfits for Ryu, Thor, Dante, Iron Man, Chris Redfield, and Captain America. The release of the pack coincided with the release of the Shadow Battle DLC.

Following the game's launch, a Marvel vs. Capcom merchandise program was launched in April 2011. Apparel wholesalers Mad Engine and Philcos sold T-shirts and sweatshirts bearing Marvel vs. Capcom 3 promotional artwork. Diamond Select Toys created a line of Minimates based on various characters from the game. Hollywood Collectibles debuted collectible statue sets featuring Akuma, Dante, Deadpool, Doctor Doom, Ryu, and Wolverine. In 2012, after the release of Ultimate Marvel vs. Capcom 3, UDON Entertainment unveiled a 200-page artbook, titled Marvel vs. Capcom: Official Complete Works, containing compilations of existing Marvel vs. Capcom imagery alongside new commissioned pieces by comic book artists.

== Reception ==
Reception

Aggregate score
Aggregator	Score
Metacritic	PS3: 84/100 (56 reviews); X360: 85/100 (77 reviews)

Review scores
Publication	Score
1Up.com	A−
Eurogamer	8/10
G4	5/5
Game Informer	9.25/10
GameSpot	8.5/10
GameTrailers	9/10
IGN	8.5/10

Marvel vs. Capcom 3: Fate of Two Worlds received positive reviews from critics, garnering aggregate scores of 85/100 and 84/100 from Metacritic for the Xbox 360 and PlayStation 3 versions, respectively.

Reviewers praised Marvel vs. Capcom 3 for its simplified, yet deep gameplay and diverse cast of characters. According to GameSpot's Maxwell McGee, the game's simplified core combat mechanics worked harmoniously to drive the action forward. McGee also praised the addition of Simple Mode, saying that its simplicity was ideal for series newcomers. Richard George of IGN stated that the alterations to the control scheme helped to mature the franchise by removing needless complexities. Neidel Crisan of 1UP.com complimented the uniqueness of the characters' play styles, stating that he enjoyed exploring the roster and possible team combinations. Brian Leahy of G4 also praised the variety and balance of characters, claiming that, unlike Marvel vs. Capcom 2, in which a large majority of the cast was "severely underpowered" compared to its top fighters, almost every character in Marvel vs. Capcom 3 seemed to be a viable option.

In contrast to its character roster, the game was criticized for its lack of diversity in game modes and online features. George expressed his disappointment that the development team did not supplement Marvel vs. Capcom 3's core experience with extras to add variety to the total package and extend its lifespan. GameTrailers criticized the Arcade Mode, stating that its "underwhelming PowerPoint-style" endings left much to be desired, especially in comparison to the intro, outro, and rival battle sequences seen in Street Fighter IV. Tim Turi of Game Informer stated that fans expecting to see extensive online functionality similar to Street Fighter IV should "regulate their excitement". Eurogamer's Simon Parkin pointed specifically to the absence of a spectator mode, noting that the exclusion of viewable matches also presented a serious shortcoming.

At the Electronic Entertainment Expo 2010, Marvel vs. Capcom 3: Fate of Two Worlds received the award for "Best Fighting Game" from the Game Critics Awards. It also earned "Best Fighting Game of E3" awards from IGN, 1UP.com, and X-Play/G4.

Marvel vs. Capcom 3: Fate of Two Worlds was nominated for Best Fighting Game at 2011 Spike Video Game Awards, but lost to Mortal Kombat.

Prior to its release, Capcom expected to sell 2 million units of Marvel vs. Capcom 3 worldwide across both platforms. The game reached number 2 in the United Kingdom PlayStation 3 sales chart, behind Call of Duty: Black Ops. On March 30, 2011, the company announced that it had shipped more than 2 million copies of the game a month and a half after its debut. In response to reaching the milestone, Capcom dubbed Marvel vs. Capcom 3 a commercial success. As of March 2024, Fate of Two Worlds has sold 2.20 million units, with Ultimate Marvel vs. Capcom 3 selling 3 million units (including the PC, PS4, & Xbox One port), bringing combined sales of both versions to 5.20 million copies.

== Ultimate Marvel vs. Capcom 3 ==
Ultimate Marvel vs. Capcom 3 is a standalone updated version of Marvel vs. Capcom 3: Fate of Two Worlds, released in November 2011 for the PlayStation 3 and Xbox 360. The game was later ported to the PlayStation Vita with PlayStation 4, Xbox One and PC versions announced in December 2016. While the update features largely identical gameplay mechanics to the original, changes were made to both the aerial combat and X-Factor systems. It features the entire roster from Fate of Two Worlds, including the two DLC characters, and introduces 12 new playable fighters. Among the added fighters, only one is a returning character from previous games in the Marvel vs. Capcom series: Strider Hiryu. The other eleven characters, all new to the franchise, are Doctor Strange, Ghost Rider, Hawkeye, Iron Fist, Nova, Rocket Raccoon, Firebrand, Frank West, Nemesis T-Type, Phoenix Wright, and Vergil.

== Sequel ==
Following the release of Ultimate Marvel vs. Capcom 3 for the PlayStation Vita in 2012, Marvel's new parent company, The Walt Disney Company, which acquired Marvel in 2009, chose not to renew Capcom's license with the Marvel characters, instead opting to put them in its own self-published Disney Infinity series. As a result, Capcom had to pull both Ultimate Marvel vs. Capcom 3 and Marvel vs. Capcom 2: New Age of Heroes off Xbox Live Arcade and the PlayStation Network in 2013. However, in 2016, Disney decided to cancel its Disney Infinity series, discontinue self-publishing efforts, and switch to a licensing-only model, allowing them to license their characters to third-party game developers, including Capcom. On December 3, 2016, Marvel vs. Capcom: Infinite was officially unveiled during Sony's PlayStation Experience event. The game was released on September 19, 2017, for PlayStation 4, Xbox One, and Microsoft Windows.
