= Project X Zone =

2012 video game

- European cover art
- Developer: Monolith Soft (Note: Banpresto, Capcom, Red Entertainment, CyberConnect2 and Sega provided additional help with development.)
- Publisher: Namco Bandai Games (Note: Released under the Banpresto brand name in Japan.)
- Director: Soichiro Morizumi
- Producers: Kensuke Tsukanaka; Koji Ishitani
- Programmers: Takahiro Matsuzawa; Yoshiharu Miyake
- Writer: Soichiro Morizumi
- Composers: Naofumi Tsuruyama; Takuya Hanaoka; Kayoko Matsushima
- Platform: Nintendo 3DS
- Release: JP: October 11, 2012; NA: June 25, 2013; EU: July 5, 2013; AU: July 4, 2013
- Genre: Tactical role-playing
- Mode: Single player

Project X Zone (Note: Japanese: プロジェクト クロスゾーン, Hepburn: Purojekuto Kurosu Zōn) (pronounced as "Project Cross Zone") is a tactical role-playing video game developed by Monolith Soft and published by Namco Bandai Games for the Nintendo 3DS. It is a follow-up to the crossover game Namco × Capcom and features characters from Namco Bandai Games, Capcom, and Sega. The game was released on October 11, 2012 in Japan; June 25, 2013 in North America; and July 5, 2013 in Europe. Project X Zone received mixed to positive reviews upon release; praise went towards the game's cast, combat system, and presentation, but criticism was directed at its repetitive gameplay and confusing storyline.

A sequel, Project X Zone 2, was released in Japan in November 2015 and in North America and Europe in February 2016.

== Gameplay ==
Stages in Project X Zone take place in grid-based locations from the game's many crossover titles. Each friendly unit is made up of two characters (thus referred to as a Pair Unit), though a third character (or "Solo Unit") can be added for once-per-battle assistance. Players can switch between these units to create different tactical combinations. Unlike Namco × Capcom, units can move freely within their range on the field map, with no penalty for accessing treasure chests or destructible objects prior to attacking.

The battle system is called the Cross Active Battle System, wherein pressing the A button in combination with the Circle Pad performs up to five basic attack combos. Additional gameplay elements include Support Attack, which allows the player to call in a nearby ally for assistance, and Cross Hit, which freezes the target in place during simultaneous attacks from multiple units. Also, the player can trigger Critical Hits by connecting their next attack just before the target hits the ground after the first. As the player's units deal damage, the player's Cross Power (XP) gauge fills up and can be used for special attacks and defensive moves on the map. Damage done via Cross Hits can fill this gauge up to 150%.

Project X Zone has a total of 15 save game slots included in the game, which can be used for recording a save game file during intermissions with a quick save file and a soft reset command.

== Plot ==
Mii Kouryuji, the latest descendant of the Kouryuji clan, and her tutor, private detective Kogoro Tenzai search for the Portalstone, the heirloom of the Kouryuji clan. As they investigate the whereabouts of the Portalstone, they team up with a large cast of characters who have been affected by strange portals appearing in their worlds, and fight against villains who have taken opportunity of the chaos caused by the rifts between worlds collapsing.

== Characters ==
Sixty playable characters from three Japanese video game companies are included in the game. The overseas versions feature the same character roster as the original Japanese version.

=== Pair units ===
- Kogorō Tenzai and Mii Kōryūji
- Yuri Lowell and Estellise Sidos Heurassein from Tales of Vesperia
- Jin Kazama and Ling Xiaoyu from Tekken
- Kite and BlackRose from .hack
- KOS-MOS and T-elos from Xenosaga
- Soma Schicksal and Alisa Ilinichina Amiella from God Eater
- Haken Browning and Kaguya Nanbu from Super Robot Taisen OG Saga: Endless Frontier
- Reiji Arisu and Xiaomu from Namco × Capcom
- Chris Redfield and Jill Valentine from Resident Evil
- Dante from Devil May Cry and Demitri Maximoff from Darkstalkers
- Ryu and Ken Masters from Street Fighter
- Chun-Li from Street Fighter and Morrigan Aensland from Darkstalkers
- X and Zero from Mega Man X
- Frank West from Dead Rising and Hsien-Ko from Darkstalkers
- Kurt Irving and Riela Marceris from Valkyria Chronicles III
- Ichirō Ōgami and Sakura Shingūji from Sakura Wars
- Gemini Sunrise and Erica Fontaine from Sakura Wars
- Akira Yuki and Pai Chan from Virtua Fighter
- Toma and Cyrille from Shining Force EXA
- Zephyr and Leanne from Resonance of Fate

=== Solo units ===
- Flynn Scifo from Tales of Vesperia
- Alisa Bosconovitch from Tekken
- Heihachi Mishima from Tekken
- Sänger Zonvolt from Super Robot Wars: Original Generations
- Lindow Amamiya from God Eater
- Valkyrie from Valkyrie no Bōken
- Saya from Namco × Capcom
- Neneko/Neito from Yumeria
- Lady from Devil May Cry
- Juri Han from Street Fighter
- Tron Bonne and Servbots from Mega Man Legends
- Arthur from Ghosts 'n Goblins
- Devilotte de DeathSatan IX from Cyberbots
- Batsu Ichimonji from Rival Schools
- Imca from Valkyria Chronicles III
- Ulala from Space Channel 5
- Vashyron from Resonance of Fate
- Bruno Delinger from Dynamite Cop
- Rikiya Busujima from Zombie Revenge
- Genghis Bahn III from Fighting Vipers

== Development ==
Namco Bandai came up with the idea of a "dream crossover" and brought on Capcom and Sega. The game was first revealed in a teaser by Bandai Namco on the official website until it was revealed in the April 2012 issue of Famitsu.

The initial creation of the characters were done in 3D character models before they were converted to be SD pixel art. Notable attacks used by the characters had to be done in 2D space in order to preserve its source material origin.

The game features two theme songs, with the opening song titled "Wing Wanderer" and the ending titled "GALAXY", which were both performed by Yoko Takahashi. The opening movie was created by the new animation studio Trigger, which was founded by former Gainax employees Hiroyuki Imaishi and others. The opening was directed by animator Akira Amemiya. On September 22, 2012, Katsuhiro Harada, producer of the Tekken series, had revealed on Twitter: "I proposed localization of Project X Zone." He added that the company had "not decided yet, but it will be realized if I continue proposing." Namco Bandai Games announced on January 21, 2013 that the game would be officially released in North America, Europe and Australasia during summer 2013. The English versions of the game retain the Japanese voices, like Otomedius Excellent, though the vocals for the opening theme music were removed for legal reasons. Some music tracks were removed or replaced for the same reasons. On May 1, 2016, the game was removed from the North American and European eShops.

== Reception ==
Reception

Aggregate score
Aggregator	Score
Metacritic	70/100

Review scores
Publication	Score
Destructoid	8/10
Electronic Gaming Monthly	7/10
Famitsu	32/40
GameSpot	6.5/10
GamesRadar+	2/5
IGN	8/10
Nintendo Life	8/10
RPGamer	4/5

The game sold more than 85,539 units in its first week in Japan. In the West, the game has sold over ten times more than what Bandai Namco had expected. The game was among the 20 best games sold in the United Kingdom after it made its debut. In the United States, the game has been among the best selling games sold for the 3DS. The game has sold over 400,000 copies worldwide, according to Bandai Namco.

Project X Zone has received mixed to positive reviews from western critics. The game currently has a score of 70 out of 100 on Metacritic. IGN's Scott Thompson gave Project X Zone a score of 8 out of 10, saying, "Project X Zone is often funny and consistently frantic – two traits not necessarily associated with tactical RPGs. Its story is confusing and the chapters slavishly follow the same repetitive formula, but the superb battle system makes repetition not just tolerable, but enjoyable." GameRevolution gave it a 3.5 out of 5, saying, "Despite the lack of depth and the repetition of combat, Project X Zone follows through as a tactical, humorous, preposterous romp through the best hits of video games. Even if you find the combat system strange, the streak of character cameos and the ridiculous number of hits that rack up with every battle will make any hardcore fan smile with appreciation. And if you're anything like me, that's hard to do." On a more negative note, GamesRadar gave Project X Zone a 2 out of 5, saying, "With the wealth of RPGs, and even great SRPGs, that have arrived on the 3DS in the last several months, it would almost be unconscionable not to recommend one of those games instead of Project X Zone. Fun combat and screaming Tekken characters can only take you so far."

Kotaku's Mike Fahey included Project X Zone in his top ten games of 2013. In 2014, Kotaku also included the game among "The 12 Best Games on the 3DS".

== Sequel ==
A sequel, Project X Zone 2 was released for the 3DS in Japan in November 2015 and in North America and Europe in February 2016.
