= Darkstalkers (TV series) =

Television series

- A.D. Vision VHS cover art
- Genre: Fantasy; Adventure; Comedy
- Created by: Erik Kuska
- Based on: Darkstalkers by Capcom
- Developed by: Richard Mueller
- Written by: Richard Mueller; Christy Marx; Douglas Booth; Kat Likkel; Brooks Wachtel; Katherine Lawrence
- Directed by: Dora Case; J.K. Kim; Sue Peters
- Voices of: Saffron Henderson
- Ending theme: "Trouble Man" by Eikichi Yazawa
- Composer: William Kevin Anderson
- Countries of origin: United States; Japan
- Original language: English
- No. of seasons: 1
- No. of episodes: 13

Production
- Executive producers: Kenzo Tsujimoto; Stephanie Graziano; Jun Aida; Daniel S. Kletzky
- Producers: Victor Dal Chele; Gwen Wetzler; Akio Sakai; Takeshi Sekiguchi; Kenzo Tsujimoto
- Running time: 20 mins
- Production companies: Graz Entertainment; Capcom

Original release
- Network: Syndication
- Release: September 30 – December 30, 1995

DarkStalkers (also known as DarkStalkers: The Animated Series) is a children's animated television series produced by Graz Entertainment and aired on first-run syndication from September to December 1995. The cartoon is loosely based on the Capcom fighting game Darkstalkers: The Night Warriors. It ran for one season of thirteen episodes.

== Plot ==
As the television series was aimed towards a young audience, the violence and the sexual content present in the games were toned down. In addition, rather than following the complex backstory of the games, the show went for a standard good-vs.-evil plot. Various changes were made to the game characters themselves, most notably Morrigan Aensland, who became a villain descended from Morgan le Fay, and served alongside Demitri Maximoff (who was her rival in the games), under Pyron's command. The main protagonist is an ordinary human boy named Harry Grimoire, a descendant of Merlin created exclusively for the show, with whom Felicia forms a partnership.

== Crew ==
- Susan Blu - Voice Director

== Episodes ==
1. "Out of the Dark" (written by Richard Mueller)
2. "Donovan's Bane" (written by Christy Marx)
3. "The Game" (written by Kat Likkel)
4. "Pyramid Power" (written by Douglas Booth)
5. "And the Walls Come Tumblin' Down" (written by Brooks Wachtel)
6. "Ghost Hunter" (written by Katherine Lawrence)
7. "Little Bigfoot's Last Stand" (written by Kat Likkel)
8. "My Harry's in the Highlands" (written by Richard Mueller)
9. "Aliens Keep Out" (written by Katherine Lawrence)
10. "Samurai's Honor" (written by Christy Marx)
11. "There's no Business Like Dragon Business" (written by Brooks Wachtel)
12. "Darkest Before the Dawn" (written by Richard Mueller)
13. "Everyone's a Critic" (written by Richard Mueller)

== Production ==
The series was co-produced by Capcom USA and Graz Entertainment. According to a June 1995 news article in GamePro, the show would "star Bobby Bridges [later renamed Harry Grimoire], a kid who befriends the game's supernatural cast of characters and sets out to prevent an alien invasion." Jun Aida, Capcom's director of licensing, said: "With an enormous built-in audience of young arcade players across the nation and a colorful range of fun, but spooky characters who lend themselves so well to animated television, we're confident that Darkstalkers will be a big hit with kids everywhere. This show will make it hip to be scared. ... It's this decade's answer to the popular Ghostbusters sensation of the 80s."

== Reception ==
The series was received negatively, both as an adaptation and as an animated series, mainly amongst fans who compared the show to the production values of the original games. The games are significantly different from this series, which is aimed at a younger audience. Topless Robot included Harry Grimoire, who "turned Capcom's gorgeously animated fighting game into a cheap, unfunny comedy," on their 2010 list of the 10 worst cartoon kid sidekicks. Rachel Jagielski of VentureBeat commented, "The plot is bad. But even more offensive than that is the shoddy animation." Ryan Winterhalter of GamesRadar, in 2014, blamed the "network" (of which, it did not air on any; it was syndicated) in his negative review, opining that the show "takes the characters that fighting gamers know and love and throws them out the window. In their place, [UPN] inserted the most idiotic band of video game character doppelgangers that you could imagine." The same year, Henry Gilbert of GamesRadar commented, "If you're one of those unfortunate enough to have watched the horrendous Darkstalkers cartoon that aired in the US, you have my sympathies." Vincent Chiucchi of 411Mania rated it first in his 2008 list of the top five "most shameful" video game cartoons, lambasting it as "the worst video game cartoon in history" while adding, "Everything about this cartoon is horrible. The plot is stupid, the animation is complete garbage, and the dialog is atrocious."

== See also ==
- Mortal Kombat: Defenders of the Realm
- Night Warriors: Darkstalkers' Revenge – Original video animated series
- Street Fighter (TV series)
