= Night Warriors: Darkstalkers' Revenge (OVA) =

Original video animated series

- First North American DVD cover, featuring Demitri Maximoff (back) and Morrigan Aensland (front)
- Genre: Action; Horror
- Original video animation
- Directed by: Masashi Ikeda
- Produced by: Masayuki Miyashita; Kenichiro Zaizen; Masao Maruyama
- Written by: Masashi Ikeda (1–2); Tatsuhiko Urahata (3–4)
- Music by: Kow Otani
- Studio: Madhouse
- Licensed by: AUS: Madman Entertainment; NA: Viz Communications (expired); Pioneer Entertainment (expired); Discotek Media
- Released: March 21, 1997 – March 27, 1998
- Runtime: 40 minutes (each)
- Episodes: 4
- icon

Night Warriors: Darkstalkers' Revenge, originally titled Vampire Hunter: The Animated Series (ヴァンパイアハンター THE ANIMATED SERIES) in Japan, is a four-episode original video animation (OVA) series by Madhouse Studios under license from Capcom, directed by Masashi Ikeda, originally released in 1997–1998. It is an adaptation of Capcom's Darkstalkers video game series.

== Plot ==
In the midst of a war between the families of Demitri Maximoff and Morrigan Aensland for control of the Demon World, alien invader Pyron arrives on Earth and plans to take it over by taking out those who stand a chance of stopping him, namely the Darkstalkers. Meanwhile, dhampir Donovan Baine seeks to rid himself of the cursed blood which runs through his veins.

Four of the original Darkstalkers, Anakaris, Aulbath (Rikuo), Sasquatch and Victor, are featured in the intro but not in the OVA's main storyline, apparently having been killed by Pyron in a flashback sequence shown in the beginning of the fourth episode.

== Characters ==
Character	Japanese voice actor	English dubbing actor
Morrigan Aensland	Rei Sakuma	Kathleen Barr
Demitri Maximoff	Akio Ōtsuka	Paul Dobson
Donovan	Unshō Ishizuka	Ari Solomon
Felicia	Yukana	Janyse Jaud
Gallon (Jon Talbain)	Fumihiko Tachiki	Alvin Sanders
Bishamon/Hannya	Masashi Ebara	Don Brown/Michael Dobson
Phobos (Huitzil)	Jūrōta Kosugi	Ward Perry
Pyron	Shinji Ogawa	David Kaye
Lei-Lei (Hsien-Ko)	Yūko Miyamura	Nicole Oliver
Lin-Lin (Mei-Ling)	Maya Okamoto	Jane Perry
Anita	Akiko Yajima	Andrea Libman
Zabel Zarock (Lord Raptor)	Kōichi Yamadera	Scott McNeil
Lei-Lei and Lin-Lin's mother	Kumiko Takizawa	Kathleen Barr

== Episodes ==
1. "Return of the Darkstalkers"
2. "Blood of Darkness, Power of Darkness"
3. "Pyron Descending"
4. "For Whom They Fight"

== Production ==
Night Warriors: Darkstalkers' Revenge is based on the Darkstalkers series of gothic-themed fighting games by Capcom. Characters were designed by Shūkō Murase and the animation was done by Asami Endo and Yoshinori Kanada. The ending theme for the series, "Trouble Man" by Eikichi Yazawa, was also used as the opening theme in the Japanese home port of the video game Darkstalkers: The Night Warriors.

== Release ==
By the time the first episode of the series was released in Japan, Viz Media had secured the U.S. rights and announced plans to release the series later in 1997. Despite this, Toshifumi Yoshida and Trish Ledoux did not produce an English-dubbed version until 1999. The series was released on VHS, DVD and UMD in 2000. The North American anime company Media Blasters distributed it via rental kiosks in 2010. The series was re-released on DVD in 2012 by Madman Entertainment. Discotek Media released a remastered version on DVD in both language versions in the fall of 2015 and on Blu-ray for the first time in 2022.

The original soundtrack CD for Night Warriors: Darkstalkers' Revenge: The Animated Series (B00004SPLQ) was released in the United States by Viz Music in 1998. The anime series' manga and drama CD adaptations of were published only in Japan.

== Reception ==
Night Warriors: Darkstalkers' Revenge received good reviews in the Western game magazines, with scores including B+ from GameFan in America and 4/5 from Consoles + in France. Bryn Williams of Gamers' Republic too gave it a score of B+, praising its "superb" animation "with vivid colors and smooth motion," as well as "gorgeous" character designs. Dave Halverson from the same magazine opined it was "the finest video game-based anime produced to date," citing animation quality, "spectacular" and "breathtaking" art and vibrant colors; the English dubbing, "while not perfect," was described as very good.

Darkstalkers is featured in the 2009 book 500 Essential Anime Movies by Helen McCarthy. Richard Coombs of Blistered Thumbs ranked it as the seventh best video game cartoon in 2011.
