= Felicia (Darkstalkers) =

- Darkstalkers character
- Felicia in Darkstalkers Resurrection (2013)
- First game: Darkstalkers: The Night Warriors (1994)
- Created by: Alex Jimenez
- Designed by: Hiroshi Shibata
- Voiced by: English: Janyse Jaud (Japanese animated series); G. K. Bowes (Marvel vs. Capcom 3: Fate of Two Worlds, Ultimate Marvel vs. Capcom 3, Teppen); Japanese: Kae Araki (games, 1994–2008); Yukana (Japanese animated series); Kana Asumi (games, 2011–present)

In-universe information
- Species: Catgirl
- Origin: Las Vegas Valley, Las Vegas, Nevada, United States
- Nationality: American

Felicia (Japanese: フェリシア, Hepburn: Ferishia) is a character from the Darkstalkers fighting game series created by Capcom, where she is an optimistic American catgirl who was raised in a convent. Introduced in the 1994 game Darkstalkers: The Night Warriors and returned for its subsequent sequels, she has also appeared in other games outside of the Darkstalkers series and related media and merchandise, becoming a well-known Capcom personality among critics.

== Conception and design ==
The concept for Darkstalkers came in part from Capcom staff member Alex Jimenez, who pitched the idea of developing a fighting game using Universal Pictures' horror movie monsters. As it shifted to using original characters, he conceived several concepts, amongst them a catwoman named Felicia. While catwomen were not part of the Universal Pictures horror character lineup, the concept of catwomen appeared in films by other companies at the time. As envisioned by Jimenez, Felicia was originally a "tall, graceful Maasai" woman from Africa with short cropped hair, and as a werepanther would transform into that form for certain attacks. However, he was informed his original concept would be an "uphill battle" by a member of Capcom's North American staff due to Japan's avoidance of using black characters. Jimenez named her Felicia due to both its similarity to the word feline and it being the name of a coworker's wife.

Felicia was one of two female characters planned for the game from its earliest planning stages, alongside Morrigan Aensland. While early versions of Morrigan wanted her to be a cute vampire, several designs were considered for Felicia, including the aforementioned panther and one stylized after a cheetah. Other designs such as one with multiple tails and another with a tube dress and cat bells were also considered, with the development team feeling these had begun to look more like a yokai or catgirl than the original catwoman character concept. Though she was initially planned to be the game's "sex symbol with massive breasts", as development progressed Felicia quickly settled into a "cute" archetype instead, with Morrigan's design changed to be more sexual.

Capcom developer Haruo Murata felt she making her cute added a "unique kind of comfort" to the game when most of the cast was designed to be "scary". While the character's finalized design was created by Hiroshi Shibata, several animators helped with her implementation. Of these, Shinji Kaminaguchi was given a lot of freedom to try different concepts, and tried to incorporate ideas from the anime series Sazae-san. Meanwhile, Norihide Fujii developed her "Please Help Me" attack, finding it interesting to include a non-aggressive move in a fighting game. Kaname Fujioka meanwhile wanted her animations to have a tendency to be adorable to fit her cute nature, but also focused on her feline moment, "consciously focusing on cool, agile, and graceful posing".

Felicia is a curvaceous cat woman, and as such, has cat ears, a mane of long, blue hair, pointed teeth, a tail, and oversized paw-like, clawed hands and feet that she uses in battle. She is completely nude, and is only covered up by white fur partially obscuring her breasts, stomach, hips and crotch in thin strips, and entirely covering her arms and legs. Her name is adapted from the name Felicity.

== Appearances ==
=== In video games ===
Felicia is a catwoman who was taken in and raised by a Catholic nun named Rose. When Rose died, Felicia left home hoping to become a pop star. She knew that the outside world was not pretty as it was filled with much prejudice towards Darkstalkers for being different. Despite this, Felicia never lost hope, as she remembered what she was told before that one has to obtain happiness on one's own. She wishes there to be a way for peaceful coexistence between Darkstalkers and humans alike. For that, she pursues her dream of becoming a star to serve as a bridge between them. During her travels, she met many other catgirls of her kind, and with her newfound friends (Alto, Grace, Lucy, Nana & Mimi, Nonno, and Piko), she set out for her dream of being on stage.

Besides the Darkstalkers series, Felicia appears as a playable character in several other video games (not only limited to the fighting game genre), including Capcom Fighting Evolution, Cross Edge, Marvel vs. Capcom 2: New Age of Heroes, Marvel vs. Capcom 3: Fate of Two Worlds, Pocket Fighter (where she can change into Mega Man), Puzzle Fighter, Project X Zone 2, SNK vs. Capcom: The Match of the Millennium, Ultimate Marvel vs Capcom 3 and Puzzle Spirits. She has also appeared in card-based games, including SNK vs. Capcom: Card Fighters Clash, Street Fighter: Battle Combination and Onimusha Soul (redesign to fit it feudal Japan theme). In the crossover tactical role-playing game Namco × Capcom, Felicia teams up with King II from Tekken to make the only two-character team in the game to include both a Namco character and a Capcom character. A cosplay costume of her can be worn by Nick Ramos in Super Ultra Dead Rising 3 Arcade Remix Hype EX Plus Alpha DLC. Felicia appears as the main character of a puzzle game for mobile phones, Felicia no Magical Step (フェリシアのマジカルステップ; 'Felicia's Magical Step').

=== In other media ===
Felicia is the main hero in the American cartoon series Darkstalkers (1995), in which she was accompanied by Harry Grimoire, a character created for this particular series whose purpose (aside from a plot device) was mainly to get Felicia into trouble. She is also stated to be several hundred years old in this. Her dreams of being a singer are never mentioned (although in the first episode she was fired from Cats because her "costume" was "out of date"). Felicia was also depicted as possibly being the last of her kind, despite having other catgirl friends in the game series itself.

The anime OVA Night Warriors: Darkstalkers' Revenge (1997), Felicia is shown as already having a certain amount of success as an entertainer and is just starting a tour in the human world with her own traveling show. Her tour gets off to a rough start when she is almost killed by monks pertaining to an anti-darkstalker militia and the zombie Lord Raptor saves her by promptly killing them all. Later, as Pyron begins his bid for world domination, Felicia attacks his Huitzil robot army. She destroys a few of the robots before being overwhelmed, but she is saved when the werewolf Jon Talbain intervenes. She is taken in by a human doctor and befriends the local children, only to be captured by a human paramilitary group. The doctor rescues her and with her faith in humanity renewed she, along with Talbain, lures the robots out of the town and destroying them with an explosives laden train. In this interpretation of Felicia, her origin is not mentioned, and she is ambivalent to organized religion.

In the UDON Comics version of Darkstalkers, Felicia is still looking for her big break into stardom; unfortunately being a catgirl proves to be a very large roadblock on the path to fame. Along the way, she runs into Talbain who believes that humans are treacherous and vile, while she thinks that the current hatred between humans and darkstalkers are just a few "bumps in the road". Despite the fact that his interference costs her a potential gig, Felicia asks Talbain to accompany her, so that she can try to prove to him that humanity is not all bad. Eventually, they end up at the Catholic orphanage where Felicia grew up; her foster mother is named Sister Cecillia and is still alive and active in her foster daughter's life.

== Promotion and reception ==
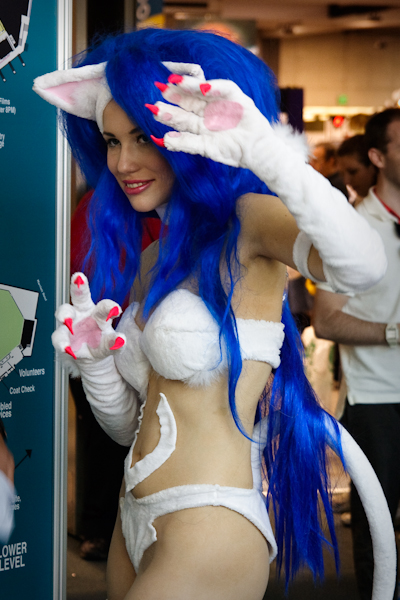
A cosplay of Felicia at San Diego Comic-Con 2009

Several figurines of Felicia have been made since her introduction, ranging from immobile figurines by companies such as Kaiyodo, Volks, Yujin, Clayz, Kotobukiya, and MIT Japan, to a posable action figure by Medicom Toy. She is also a character card in the collectible card game Universal Fighting System.

Felicia has been well received since her debut, with Russian magazine Страна игр describing her as especially beloved by anime fans and often the subject of fan works by people that have no familiarity with the Darkstalkers series. The staff of GamesRadar+ named her one of Capcom's best characters. They further stated she was one of the most well-known characters from the series, second only to Morrigan, describing her as having "the grace, agility and claws that fit her cross species" while hopeful to see her return in later games. The staff of Mean Machines Sega meanwhile state that Felicia felt "strangely out of place" amongst the Darkstalkers cast, feeling more in line with "manga "fantasy" portrayals of women. However, they also felt her cuteness made her one of Night Warriors's "most endearing characters".

Todd Ciolek of Anime News Network noted that while Felicia was essentially shown as naked in the game, designs such as her's and Morrigan's in Darkstalkers seemed to him "a tad less ridiculous than the cleavage armor and techno-bikinis donned by women in other games", something he suggested had to do with the series' reliance on pop culture monster media. Diamond Feit of the Retronauts podcast cited Felicia as an example of how Capcom "leaned into sexiness" with Darkstalkers, due to the nudity and being "very bouncy". Co-host Ant Cooke describing her as "lovingly animated" in the game, but added that it felt it was a bit weird seeing the design carried over to her chibi character design in Super Puzzle Fighter, asking "shouldn't she be wearing a bit more?" Meanwhile, Chad Hunter of Complex felt that Felicia not only represented the "slutty innocent fighter girl stereotype" in video games but pushed it excessively, expressing surprise as to how often the character has appeared in later games.

The 2009 book 500 Essential Anime Movies: The Ultimate Guide cited Felicia and Morrigan as examples of the popularity of the Darkstalkers character designs, with fans frequently cosplaying as the character at various conventions since the original game's release. Capcom acknowledged this trend, citing how often such was seen by players of their games. However, due to Felicia's design and amount of exposed skin, this has caused some difficulty for cosplayers to properly demonstrate without risking overexposure, with Jayme Rebecca Taylor in a dissertation for the University of British Columbia citing the lengths and creativity one cosplayer went to properly portray the character. Japanese gaming magazine Game Yuu II meanwhile discussed a growing trend they noticed at the time of cosplay often veering into over-epxposure, citing Felicia's design as one that necessitated it.

Drew Mackie on his website Thrilling Tales of Old Video Games found it interesting that Felicia's skin tone was often shown as tan, and in a way that reflected how Capcom at the time illustrated black characters in its fighting games. In particular, he drew comparison to Elena for Street Fighter III. He pointed out that while Elena featured white hair, he found it interesting that Elena's portrayal as "tall, slender and graceful" felt very close to what Jiminez had originally intended for Felicia.
