= Lilith (Darkstalkers) =

Character from Darkstalkers

- Darkstalkers character
- Lilith in Vampire Savior (1997)
- First game: Vampire Savior (1997)
- Created by: Haruo Murata
- Designed by: Akira "Akiman" Yasuda
- Voiced by: Hiroko Konishi; Yuka Imai (Namco x Capcom, Cross Edge); Miyuki Sawashiro (Onimusha Soul)

In-universe information
- Species: Unknown
- Gender: Unknown (uses she/her pronouns)

Lilith (Japanese: リリス, Hepburn: Ririsu) is a character introduced in the 1997 fighting game Vampire Savior. She is a part of series character Morrigan Aensland's soul, given her own body by the villain Jedah Dohma to help with his goals. She seeks to claim Morrigan's body as her own, though in later appearances, Lilith fights alongside Morrigan instead. While she has a feminine body and uses female pronouns, Lilith's gender is officially defined as "Unknown". Originally voiced by Hiroko Konishi, she was later voiced by Yuka Imai in Namco x Capcom and Cross Edge, and by Miyuki Sawashiro in Onimusha Soul.

Since her debut, Lilith has proven a highly popular character.

== Conception and design ==
When developing Vampire Savior, the third game in Capcom's Darkstalkers franchise, several new characters were planned. The process proved to be particularly strenuous, with all but one of the first batch of new character designs and story scrapped and the project started over. With the second batch, one concept included a headswap of the previously established succubus character Morrigan Aensland, with lead developer Haruo Murata asking the question "Why does Morrigan have a doppelgänger?" and developing the character around that. The earliest design was a half-angel older sister for Morrigan, appearing exactly identical to her but having short hair as well as angel wings on her head that could unfurl. This concept would have been an evil character, and one frequently bullied by Morrigan.

General Producer Noritaka Funamizu wanted characters like Lilith to appeal to general audiences who liked character art and visual flair, intending them to stop and look at the arcade cabinet in awe at how they were animated. The design was overseen by artist Akira "Akiman" Yasuda, who had developed several characters for Capcom, but had received hard rejection early on for his work on Sakura Kasugano just prior for Street Fighter Alpha 2. By contrast, he found Funamizu to be supportive of his efforts, particularly with Lilith. Funamizu in an interview stated that Yasuda's character designs were influenced by his personal tastes at the time, which gravitated around short haired girls and an emphasis on buttocks. Yasuda added his belief that in order for the character design to work, one had to engage less on corporate calculation, and instead indulge on their personal biases, fetishes, and interests.

Several approaches were considered, such as an angelic ballerina that fought by dancing, and would just accidentally hurt her opponents. For this version, angel wings would have appeared on her back only when jumping, as they felt having them permanently displayed would have made her resemble the character Honey from Fighting Vipers. While they shifted away from the angel concept, several elements were still considered later on, such as including cherubs in some of her attacks.

Towards the end, Lilith was redesigned to be closer to Morrigan in appearance but as a flat-chested androgynous otokonoko, a male character presenting as female. Murata would later comment on the intended concept, stating it was too ahead of its time. Lilith's gender would instead be defined as "Unknown", though the character would be referred to with female pronouns. Murata clarified further that while Lilith's body appears feminine because she's copying Morrigan, they wanted it to be unclear whether she's male or female. Meanwhile, while concept art emphasized that Lilith was not Morrigan's sister, the press release for E3 1997 specifically described her as such.

Lilith stands 168 centimetres (5 ft 6 in) and has three sizes of 74-56-83 cm (29-22-33 in). Despite sharing Morrigan's succubus aspects, her species is listed as "?" in official reference material.

== Appearances ==
Lilith was introduced in the 1997 arcade fighting game Vampire Savior. Originally a fragment of Morrigan Aensland's magical power, she was separated and sealed away by Morrigan's adoptive father due to the fear she may not be able to control her excessive power. It eventually developed its own soul and personality as Lilith, watching over Morrigan as the latter lived freely. The game's antagonist, Jedah Dohma, discovers her, and grants her a temporary body to collect souls for his plan, but secretly she seeks to reunite with Morrigan. In her ending, her body starts to fail as she tries to take Morrigan's body over. However, it is suggested she merges in part with her, influencing her to wear her family's ring. In Morrigan's ending, she absorbs the dying Lilith, and finds herself seeing the world with a new, excited outlook.

Initially, Gloomy Puppet Show lacked its rhythm-game element. However, it was added in after Capcom considered their policy of reducing downtime where the player was not involved in gameplay.

== Promotion and reception ==
Lilith has been extremely popular since her debut. Diamond Feit and Ant Cooke of Retronauts in their analysis of the Darkstalkers franchise found the idea of Lilith starting conceptually as gender-neutral to be interesting. Feit stated that while she had a boyish haircut and flat chest, he saw Lilith as more a "lolita Morrigan". This was particularly due to how emphasized her sexuality was in her gameplay and how often she was presented naked in Vampire Savior, stating "they know... gender neutral whatever, they know: she's hot". Cooke meanwhile praised Gloomy Puppet Show as the greatest move in fighting game history, adding that while it was impractical due to how difficult it was to land and the difficulty in achieving significant damage, it was "so ridiculous it's great [...] it's just styling on your opponent".

Gamest magazine in their "Gals Island" series of magazines stated that while Capcom was known for the creation of several prominent female characters, Lilith by comparison felt more straightforward. They felt this worked in the character's favor, as she was shown to be massively popular, voted first place in their reader poll for the magazine. The staff stated that despite this, her lack of visible breasts was seen as controversial, describing them as "far more than just flat", helped the character to be popular amongst fans of loli aesthetics. However, they argued that much of the character's popularity stemmed from her innocent personality and "baby-face" appearance, in contrast to her more mature presentation. While they added that much discussion had revolved around Gloomy Puppet Show, they felt the character's presentation in her introduction scene and Splendor Love attack had much more charm.

In deeper analysis of character design archetypes, the Gamest staff described her as an example of a "nymphet" archetype, particularly in how she was portrayed as both devilish and eccentric in many of her voice lines. They also examined how she was part of a trend of shorter-haired characters in video games who sometimes presented a masculine side, particularly with how aggressive some of her dialogue was. They further discussed how early iterations of Lilith's design suggested that she was possibly intersex, and while it made the authors feel uncertain how to feel about her, it also helped her to be seen as "the ultimate androgynous woman".

Years later, Monthly Arcadia in their own iteration of "Gals Island" articles featured Lilith. In it, they discussed the contrast between her appearance and her more mature character themes, attributing some it to her succubus appearance, and further described such as part of her charm. Furthermore, they mentioned Gloomy Puppet Show, and how in years after the game's release players had started trying to get higher scores on it alone. Artist Hiro Suzuhira commented for the article, stating that she would often just go to the arcade to see skilled players using the character.

=== Influences and interpretations ===
Lilith has also been the subject of fan works, such as cosplay. Meanwhile, Korean video game artist and Shift Up founder Kim Hyung Tae stated her design alongside Lilith's led him to "see the unique allure of women wearing tights", something that heavily impacted his character designs afterward. Several third-party works have also featured the character, such as a five-part manga series by Mayumi Azuma that follows Lilith's interactions with a boy named John, and Lilithrottle, a doujin game developed by Mouth Punch.

Lilith has often also been cited as an example of the depiction of the biblical character Lilith in media, particularly as a succubus. Rob Gallagher in the book Artgames After GamerGate examined Cassie McQuarter's game Black Room and discussed its use of Lilith to more directly reference the religious counterpart. He discussed further how McQuarter used Lilith alongside Morrigan as standins to illustrate her issues with a male-dominated gaming industry, and further how the former was used as a sexualized character in the context of the game to display her in an environment that gave her agency.
