= Super Gem Fighter Mini Mix =

1997 video game

- Sales flyer showing the ten main fighters
- Developer: Capcom
- Publisher: Capcom: EU: Virgin Interactive Entertainment
- Platforms: Arcade, PlayStation, Sega Saturn, WonderSwan
- Release: September 1997: Arcade; WW: September 1997 PlayStation; JP: June 11, 1998; NA: August 3, 1998; EU: November 1998 Saturn; JP: July 9, 1998 WonderSwan; JP: April 6, 2000
- Genre: Fighting
- Modes: Single-player, multiplayer
- Arcade system: CP System II

Super Gem Fighter Mini Mix, also released as Pocket Fighter (Japanese: ポケットファイター) in Japan, is a 1997 fighting game developed and published by Capcom for arcades. The game uses the same super deformed character designs previously used in Super Puzzle Fighter II Turbo, a puzzle game by Capcom. It was ported in 1998 to the PlayStation, which retained the Pocket Fighter title for its North American and PAL releases, and then the Sega Saturn and WonderSwan, both in Japan only.

The return of most of the "puzzle fighters" on the roster includes characters from Street Fighter Alpha 2 and Night Warriors: Darkstalkers' Revenge, Ibuki from Street Fighter III, and Tessa from Red Earth. It also features many character cameos from various Capcom games scattered in the background of the stages.

== Gameplay ==
Gameplay screenshot of Sakura vs. Lei-Lei (Hsien-Ko) on the CPS II version

In addition to the standard fighting, there are various gems (similar to the ones seen in Super Puzzle Fighter II Turbo) that the player can collect during matches to power up their character (based on Red Earth), as well as elemental orbs which can be thrown to the opponent in a variety of angles (visually based on elemental hits in Darkstalkers), which may affect the opponent (turn into stone, freeze, etc.). Each character starts each match with one of these (Tessa always starts with the ice orb, while Ryu starts with the lightning orb). There are also treasure chests, and item carriers, which both contain items, and food that restores the player's health.

There are two bars and three sub-bars in the interface. The two main bars are the life bar and the super meter. The life bar indicates the character's remaining health and the super meter their ability to perform "Mighty Combos". The super meter can be filled up to 9 stocks. Each Mighty Combo has a level assigned to it, which determines how many "Mighty Combo" gauges it will need. Players can also perform Mega Crushes (which costs one stock of the Mighty Combo gauge and emptys the Gem gauges) that can also be done in midair, in which all of the collected gems shoot out of their character and damage the enemy, as well as Counter Crushes, where the character rolls across the screen while attacking.

Each character has animated stock icons (or lives) on the interface. Throughout the battle, the stock icon emotions for a character will change from happy, to sad, to surprised (only happens if a character is K.O.ed, or has lost a round via time over). All fighters normally start with three stock icons at the beginning of a match.

The three sub-bars at the bottom corners of the screen are the Gem gauges, which displays the level of three of the character's special moves. Each character has at least three special moves, as shown in the sub-bars, and each of these corresponds to a color. Some characters have one or two additional special moves that are not affected by sub-bars. Each time an attack connects to an opponent, gems pop out of him or her, which can then be taken to level up the corresponding special moves for additional effects.

There are four buttons: Punch, Kick, Special, and Taunt. The Special button performs a humorous move that cannot be blocked and upon impact drops gems in the opponent's possession. More gems will be dropped depending on how much the Special attack is charged. Holding Down, Forward or no direction at all when using the Special button will cause a specific gem color to drop from the enemy. Holding Back along with the Special button allows for a defense that is specific against the unblockable Special attacks. Other kinds of attacks do no damage when blocked, and unlike most 2D fighting games, this includes special moves and Mighty Combos.

Gem Fighter also features "Flash Combos", or "Costume Combos" (inspired by the Plasma Combo system derived from Star Gladiator), where the player can perform a combo by pressing the Kick or Punch button after striking their opponent with the Punch button for a total of four hits. Flash Combos are usually just for fun, and will cause a character to change into various costumes during the sequence (except for Ryu, who uses accessories for two of his Flash/Costume Combos), and perform a powerful, and humorous attack in the end - this final hit is usually the hardest in the sequence to connect with. These costumes range from uniforms (such as traffic cops or schoolgirls), to swimsuits, and even cosplays of other Capcom characters. For example, Chun-Li may turn into her version of Jill from Resident Evil, while Felicia may turn into her version of Mega Man, or other Darkstalkers characters not playable in the game.

The commands are also very easy compared to the Street Fighter series, thanks to the Special button. By doing a motion (for example: qcf or hcf) and pressing the Special Button, this will make a fighter perform their Mighty Combo. The PlayStation and Sega Saturn versions of the game add in the Character Edit and Running Battle modes.

In the WonderSwan port, due to the monochrome screen, Gems are distinguished by shape rather than color. There are also no items and no in-game dialogue. This port adds in "Point Battle", where the results are evaluated by points, and "Card Fighter", in which fights using cards of normal and special moves are included.

In the Street Fighter Alpha Anthology version of the game, there is a hidden mode, called Random Survival, which has a system similar to Running Battle, where the player has to fight against all 12 characters with two health gauges, and a hidden battle mode, in which characters can be randomly selected from preset characters and played endlessly.

== Playable characters ==
=== Street Fighter characters ===
- Ryu — A wandering martial artist who seeks to become a true warrior. He searches for Tessa in the hope that she may provide him with information on possible worthy opponents. In his ending, she sends him to battle Hauzer. However, Tessa realizes that those who went to battle Hauzer never returned alive. His attacks have lightning-themed elements, and involve punch techniques. He is the only character in the game to have plain Flash Combos instead of Costume Combos.
- Ken — A competitive martial artist who is looking for a beautiful woman to have tea with when he and his wife Eliza begin drifting apart after their honeymoon. In his ending, he eventually finds Morrigan and wins a challenge with her so they can have tea together and go shopping, but Eliza catches him out with Morrigan and begins attacking him mercilessly, much to Morrigan's amusement. His attacks involve flashy kicks and fire-ki.
- Zangief — A professional at both Sambo and Wrestling, Zangief seeks Felicia to convince her to perform a musical tour in Russia. When he finally meets Felicia, he desperately asks her to do the tour, but Felicia says that she can't because she's busy. She jokingly says that she might if he forced her to, which Zangief believes is her challenging him to a fight. Zangief wins the fight, and Felicia ultimately agrees to do the Russian tour, which becomes a hit in the country. The president of Russia is pleased at this, and agrees to reward Zangief for gaining him more support from the people in the nation.
- Chun-Li — A policewoman and Interpol agent who goes in search of a missing zoo animal and accidentally mistakes Felicia as the missing animal. In her ending, after apprehending the catwoman, Chun-Li learns of Felicia's disappearance and goes out in search of her, not knowing she already captured her.
- Ibuki — A ninja girl who searches for Sakura, who might know the location of the ice cream shop in Harajuku. In her ending, she finds Guy in Harajuku and challenges him to a fight, but declines when treated to a baked potato. Ibuki is the only SFIII playable character in the game, but several others make cameos. She is the only default character who cannot be fought as a rival.
- Sakura — A determined martial artist and school girl who makes it her destiny to look for her friend and idol, Ryu, who agrees to train her if she can defeat him. In the end, she gets her wish during the summer.

=== Darkstalkers characters ===
- Morrigan — In her story, Morrigan is jealous of Chun-Li's beauty and goes to find her to prove that she is both the most attractive and the more powerful woman. She believes that defeating her would prove it. But soon afterwards, in her ending, she finds Lilith seducing a flock of male followers. Shown-up and enraged, she realizes her quest is not finished.
- Hsien-Ko (Lei-Lei in Japan) — Hsien-Ko and her sister Mei-Ling (also known as Lin Lin in this game) are searching for Zangief, who is offering a part-time job, mainly because they are unemployed and short of money.
- Felicia — Felicia searches for Ken, who has contacts in the movie industry, so she can branch out her artistic pursuits. In her ending, Ken gets her acquainted with Fei Long, who gives her a part in his latest project; however, much to her dismay, she plays the part of the antagonist.

=== Red Earth character ===
- Tessa (Tabasa in Japan) — Tessa goes in search of a magic wand that Hsien-Ko owns. However, in the end, when she gets the magical scepter, she discovers that it belongs to Anakaris' trading company and she is, thus, transformed into a penguin in the end. She is the only Red Earth playable character in the game, although others make cameos: Leo is sitting in Tessa's chair at her den in one of the stages, she can transform into a Hauzer-like dragon in one of her supers, and she uses Mai-Ling as both a companion and human shield.

=== Secret characters ===
- Dan — Dan is looking for students to start a new school. He finds Sakura and sees her as his first student. She leaves him after three days, however, and writes him a letter saying that she's already mastered everything he'd need to teach her and that his moves "look retarded" in addition to being "useless in a fight". She ends the letter calling him a "loser" and Dan begins to shed a stream of tears.
- Akuma (Gouki in Japan) — Akuma is on the lookout for a new location to practice his skills after his island is turned into an amusement park. Hsien-Ko takes him to an abandoned graveyard in the middle of a lush forest, telling him that he can practice his skills on the zombies that come out at night. His attacks have smoke-themed elements.

== Reception ==
Reception

Aggregate score
Aggregator	Score
GameRankings	73% (PS)

Review scores
Publication	Score
Electronic Gaming Monthly	7.4 / 10
Game Informer	7.75 / 10
GamePro	4.5 / 5
GameSpot	3.5 / 10
Next Generation	3/5
PlayStation Official Magazine – UK	4 / 5
PlayStation: The Official Magazine	3.1 / 2
PSExtreme	80%

In Japan, Game Machine listed Super Gem Fighter Mini Mix as the ninth most successful arcade game of November 1997.

Next Generation reviewed the PlayStation version of the game, rating it three stars out of five, and stated that "The game itself is distracting fun for two players (although utterly mindless as a single-player game) and again, amusing. Solid stuff, but only for the true cognoscenti." PSM Magazine gave the game a score of 3.1 / 2, describing it as "A unique and humorous approach to the fighting game." and that the game "really delivers". PS Extreme gave it a score of 80%, stating that the game "should be real popular with those who enjoy fighting games, but aren't interested in memorizing long lists of moves and combos".

In 2011, Complex ranked it as the 42nd best fighting game of all time.

== Legacy and re-releases ==
A pachinko game released by SANKYO, Fever Street Fighter II, which was released five years after Gem Fighter in Japan only, re-uses most of the sprites for five of the Street Fighter series characters from this game.

Two mobile-only spin-offs based on this game, Solitier Fighter and Poker Fighter were released for cellphones in 2003 in Japan. Also, on Capcom's Japanese mobile phone site "Capcom Party", several cellphone games using the SD characters in the style of this title were distributed.

A revised version of Super Gem Fighter Mini Mix was ported to PlayStation 2 as a part of the Street Fighter Alpha-themed compilation title Street Fighter Alpha Anthology in 2006, and also as part of Capcom Fighting Collection to Nintendo Switch, PlayStation 4, Windows, and Xbox One in 2022.

== See also ==
- Battle Arena Nitoshinden
- Virtua Fighter Kids
