= Project X Zone 2 =

2015 video game

- North American cover art
- Developer: Monolith Soft
- Publisher: Bandai Namco Entertainment
- Director: Soichiro Morizumi
- Producer: Koji Ishitani
- Designer: Atsushi Minayama
- Writer: Soichiro Morizumi
- Composers: Yuzo Koshiro (Opening and Ending)
- Platform: Nintendo 3DS
- Release: JP: November 12, 2015; EU/AU: February 12, 2016; NA: February 16, 2016
- Genre: Tactical role-playing
- Mode: Single-player

Project X Zone 2 (Note: Known in Japan as Project X Zone 2: Brave New World (Japanese: プロジェクト クロスゾーン2：ブレイブニューワールド, Hepburn: Purojekuto Kurosu Zōn 2: Bureibu Nyū Wārudo)) (pronounced as "Project Cross Zone 2") is a tactical role-playing video game developed by Monolith Soft and published by Bandai Namco Entertainment for the Nintendo 3DS. Despite the game being the sequel to the crossover game Project X Zone, the plot is a homage to the events of its spiritual predecessor, Namco × Capcom, while retaining a standalone story. The game is a crossover between various franchises from Bandai Namco, Capcom, Nintendo and Sega. Project X Zone 2 was released in Japan in November 2015, and worldwide in February 2016.

== Plot ==
Shibuya, Tokyo has been locked down because of paranormal events. Two organizations had previously fought there. Shinra, a secret organization dedicated to protecting the Earth from otherworldly threats and Ouma, an evil organization who use dimensional rifts to conquer the world. After their defeat, all seemed well. But rifts have started appearing once more.

Agents of Shinra, Reiji and Xiaomu, meet with Chris Redfield and Jill Valentine of the BSAA to investigate the appearance of mysterious golden chains that have appeared in Shibuya, which seem to be causing strong rifts in space-time. While investigating, they stumble across Heihachi, Phoenix Wright, Maya Fey, Goro Majima, and Kazuma Kiryu. This marks the start of an adventure that crosses into several worlds, where they meet with characters whose worlds have also been affected by these rifts.

== Gameplay ==
Like its predecessor, Project X Zone is a tactical role-playing game in which players strategically maneuver their characters across a field to battle with the enemy. Characters are paired up into Pair Units, with Solo Units consisting of a single character able to assist them when linked together. In battle, players use well-timed attacks and combos to do as much damage to the opponent as possible before their turn ends.

== Characters ==
Like its predecessor, Project X Zone 2 features pairs of characters from three Japanese video game companies (Bandai Namco Entertainment, Capcom, and Sega), as well as solo characters who can provide assist attacks during combat. The game also features Nintendo characters as special guests for the first time. A total of 58 characters are playable in the game.

=== Pair units ===
- Reiji Arisu and Xiaomu from Namco × Capcom
- Jin Kazama and Kazuya Mishima from Tekken
- Kite and Haseo from .hack and .hack//G.U.
- Yuri Lowell and Flynn Scifo from Tales of Vesperia
- Ciel Alençon and Nana Kazuki from God Eater 2
- KOS-MOS and Fiora from Xenosaga and Xenoblade Chronicles
- Chris Redfield and Jill Valentine from Resident Evil
- Ryu and Ken Masters from Street Fighter
- Demitri Maximoff and Morrigan Aensland from Darkstalkers
- Dante and Vergil from Devil May Cry
- X and Zero from Mega Man X
- Strider Hiryu and Hotsuma from Strider and Shinobi
- Chun-Li and Ling Xiaoyu from Street Fighter and Tekken
- Akira Yuki and Kage-Maru from Virtua Fighter
- Ichirō Ōgami and Erica Fontaine from Sakura Wars
- Sakura Shinguji and Gemini Sunrise from Sakura Wars
- Kazuma Kiryu and Goro Majima from Like A Dragon
- Zephyr and Vashyron from Resonance of Fate
- Chrom and Lucina from Fire Emblem Awakening

=== Solo units ===
- Heihachi Mishima from Tekken
- Natsu from Soulcalibur V
- Aty from Summon Night 3
- Valkyrie from Valkyrie no Bōken: Toki no Kagi Densetsu
- Alisa Illinichina Amiella from God Eater
- Estellise Sidos Heurassein from Tales of Vesperia
- Captain Commando from Captain Commando
- June Lin Milliam from Star Gladiator
- Leon S. Kennedy from Resident Evil
- Felicia from Darkstalkers
- Ingrid from Capcom Fighting Evolution
- Axel Stone from Streets of Rage
- Hibana from Nightshade
- Segata Sanshiro
- Ulala from Space Channel 5
- Pai Chan from Virtua Fighter
- Leanne from Resonance of Fate
- Ryo Hazuki from Shenmue
- Phoenix Wright with Maya Fey from Ace Attorney

== Development ==
On April 8, 2015, Famitsu.com launched a teaser website with a countdown that would expire in five days, revealing a secret project from Bandai Namco Entertainment. Before its expiration, Project X Zone 2 was announced early to attendees of Bandai Namco's "Level Up" press event in Milan, Italy on April 10, which was prematurely posted on Italian news website E-duesse before being retracted. The game was officially revealed to the public three days later. It was confirmed in an interview that the game will address the criticisms of the original (such as the story) and that there will be some "surprise" announcements. The game was originally going to have a simultaneous worldwide release, but the North American and European releases were later delayed to early 2016. Unlike the previous game, the western versions features no altered content from the Japanese version and are in multiple languages.

The game's opening and ending themes, "Sekai wa Hitotsu no Butai" (All the World's Stage), and "Tsuki Akari no Curtain Call" (Moonlight Curtain Call) were both performed by marina. The lyrics were written by director Soichiro Morizumi, and the themes were composed by Yuzo Koshiro. Koshiro had previously composed the theme of Namco × Capcom, Brave New World, and this time Morizumi asked him to compose a song that was more akin to battle music. Koshiro decided to go with a rock theme, and found that marina's vocals were perfect for the song. marina expressed that while she found the song difficult to sing, she thought it turned out very well.

The game's opening animation was produced by Graphinica and directed by veteran animator Yasutoshi Iwasaki.

== Reception ==
Reception

Aggregate score
Aggregator	Score
Metacritic	73/100

Review scores
Publication	Score
Destructoid	8.5/10
Electronic Gaming Monthly	7/10
Famitsu	32/40
GameSpot	5/10
IGN	6.5/10
Nintendo Life	8/10
RPGamer	3.5/5
Hardcore Gamer	4/5

Project X Zone 2 received mixed to positive reviews, receiving a score of 73/100 on Metacritic, with critics praising the game's cast of characters and improvements to issues present in the first game, but criticizing the game's easy difficulty and the fact that many assets were reused from the first game. The game received a 32/40 from Famitsu. Hardcore Gamer gave the game a 4/5 saying, "Project X Zone 2 is a funny, charming and amusing title. It sets out to entertain video game fans of all stripes and allows the player to jump from world to world to get a taste of other titles they may have been missing. Just based on the built-in "Crosspedia" encyclopedia database, the stack of games that I really want to try out has grown (Resonance of Fate, in particular). It's not challenging, but it was never meant to be. The gameplay is simply the vehicle to deliver the true focus of this title: dumb fun. Players who don't need everything to bristle with a dark malevolence will find a great time in this one."

=== Sales ===
The game sold 37,000 copies in Japan on its first week, selling through 60% of its shipment. The game made the #2 spot in the UK 3DS sales charts.

== Legacy ==
In an interview with Nintendo Life, Kensuke Tsukanaka stated that he would like to continue the series, though he admitted it would not be easy to realize each time.

Hideki Kamiya of PlatinumGames has stated he was approached about having Sega character Bayonetta included in this game, to which he refused as he wanted Bayonetta and Dante from Devil May Cry to meet "on his own terms". However, he has stated he has come to regret this decision due to realizing how the fans would have loved the two interacting, and that if there is a Project X Zone 3 he would be all for Bayonetta's inclusion.
