= Namco × Capcom =

2005 tactical role-playing video game

- Developer: Monolith Soft
- Publisher: Namco
- Director: Soichiro Morizumi
- Producer: Koji Ishitani
- Artists: Takuji Kawano; Kazue Saito; Kazunori Haruyama
- Writer: Soichiro Morizumi
- Composer: Yuzo Koshiro
- Platform: PlayStation 2
- Release: JP: May 26, 2005
- Genre: Tactical role-playing
- Mode: Single-player

Namco × Capcom (Note: Japanese: ナムコ クロス カプコン, Hepburn: Namuko Kurosu Kapukon) (pronounced as "Namco Cross Capcom") is a 2005 tactical role-playing (RPG) video game developed by Monolith Soft and published by Namco for the PlayStation 2. The gameplay combines tactical RPG and action sequences during battles, featuring characters from video game series owned by Namco and Capcom. The narrative sees original characters Reiji Arisu and Xiaomu, operatives for paranormal investigative group Shinra, confront distortions bringing characters from other realities into their own.

The project was proposed by Monolith Soft to celebrate Namco's 50th anniversary, and Capcom was contacted as a partner due to their large character roster. Development began in 2003, directed and written by former Banpresto staff member Soichiro Morizumi. The artwork was cooperatively designed by Soulcalibur artist Takuji Kawano, Kazue Saito of Super Robot Wars, and veteran artist Kazunori Haruyama. The soundtrack uses arrangements of themes from the represented series, with original themes composed by Yuzo Koshiro.

First announced in January 2005, the game was never released outside Japan, a fact attributed to the obscurity of some characters and the scale of its script. Releasing to strong sales, the game was given mixed reviews by Japanese and English journalists. Following Namco × Capcom, Monolith Soft would work on some other crossover titles, including the successor Project X Zone in 2012 for the Nintendo 3DS.

== Gameplay ==
Namco × Capcom features the use of grid-based tactical movement (top) and battles involving real-time action inputs to create combinations and charge special attacks (bottom).

Namco × Capcom is a tactical role-playing game which puts players in control of teams of characters drawn from the video game properties of Namco and Capcom. Gameplay is divided into levels, which are unlocked as the player progresses through the narrative. These levels are split between story segments told through character interactions and gameplay where party members face off against enemy parties, with victory conditions which include clearing the field of enemies. In addition to normal story missions, the player can engage in training levels using training dummies to practice moves. They can also purchase items for healing or character boosts at shops using currency won during battles and through a gambling minigame activated between certain story chapters.

Character moves and actions are dictated by Ability Points (AP), of which a set amount is assigned to each character at the beginning of a battle. The game's turn-based battles play out in a grid-based arena from an overhead perspective; each unit on both sides has their turn placed according to their current AP. Any character with ten AP can move and perform actions, with AP being recovered by doing little or nothing for each turn. Movement distance varies between characters, with some walking or flying and others being able to pass over obstacles. Playable characters appear in both pairs and as solo units, with different characters specializing in short or long-range attacks based on their abilities in their native series.

When units engage in battle, the game transitions into a horizontal view. Timed button presses trigger different attacks. Each unit's attack number is dictated by a counter labelled "Branch". When the Branch counter is depleted, the battle ends, and if the enemy unit is defeated, they disappear from the map. Successful attacks begin a combination, which increase a character's experience point (EXP) reward. Continual attacks also raise a character's fatigue level, which when maxed out will prevent them from moving for several turns.

Successful attacks build up a special meter which allows for a unit-specific special attack. Some units can also perform a Multi-Assault attack at the cost of 50 MP, either on their own or in combination with 1 or 2 other units to target multiple enemies at once or deal heavy damage to a single enemy. The player party can also engage in a defensive battle when attacked, pressing the directional buttons shown on screen to decrease damage and regain AP. Some units can also directly counterattack, which drains 30 points of the special meter and some AP. With each battle, player characters gain experience levels based on earned EXP.

== Synopsis ==
The story opens with Reiji Arisu and his kitsune mentor Xiaomu, operatives for the supernatural investigative task force Shinra, being called to deal with interdimensional rifts opening in their world. These rifts pull in beings from alternate realities, many of which ally with Reiji and Xiaomu to fight both the forces behind the rifts and opponents drawn from their native universes. The group is opposed by Ouma, a group dedicated to causing chaos, with their main rival being Ouma operative Saya, a being similar to Xiaomu. It is eventually revealed that Ouma wishes to resurrect a dark deity dubbed "99" through the merging of multiple realities. Reiji's father Shougo fought Saya to prevent this ten years before and was forced to sacrifice himself with Xiaomu's aid to succeed. While initially defeated, Ouma succeeds in merging the worlds, and 99 is resurrected using Saya as a host. While Reiji is prepared to sacrifice himself as Shougo did, his and Xiaomu's allies return from their realities and combine their powers to cripple 99. Saya allows herself to be killed by Reiji to destroy 99 permanently. At a celebratory party which all their allies attend, Reiji and Xiaomu mutually declare their love for each other.

=== Characters ===
==== Pair units ====
- Reiji Arisu and Xiaomu
- Klonoa and Guntz (Klonoa)
- Krino Sandra and Sabine (The Legend of Valkyrie)
- Stahn Aileron and Rutee Katrea (Tales of Destiny)
- Gilgamesh and Ki (The Tower of Druaga)
- Shion Uzuki and M.O.M.O. (Xenosaga)
- Toby Masuyo (Baraduke) and Hiromi Tengenji (Burning Force)
- Bravoman (Bravoman) and Wonder Momo (Wonder Momo)
- Tarosuke (Yokai Dochuki) and Taira no Kagekiyo (Genpei Tōma Den)
- King (Tekken) and Felicia (Darkstalkers)
- Baby Head and Mack the Knife (Captain Commando)
- Morrigan Aensland and Lilith (Darkstalkers)
- Unknown Soldier 1P and Unknown Soldier 2P (Forgotten Worlds)
- MegaMan Volnutt and Roll Caskett (Mega Man Legends)
- Tron Bonne and Servbot (Mega Man Legends)
- Hideo Shimazu and Kyoko Minazuki (Rival Schools: United By Fate)
- Chun-Li and Cammy (Street Fighter)
- Sakura Kasugano and Karin Kanzuki (Street Fighter Alpha)
- Hsien-Ko (Darkstalkers) and Fong Ling (Resident Evil: Dead Aim)
- Guy (Final Fight) and Ginzu the Ninja (Captain Commando)
- Bruce McGivern (Resident Evil: Dead Aim) and Regina (Dino Crisis)

==== Solo units ====
- Waya-Hime (Bravoman)
- Taizo Hori (Dig Dug)
- Valkyrie (The Legend of Valkyrie)
- Heishirō Mitsurugi (Soulcalibur)
- Taki (Soulcalibur)
- Judas (Tales of Destiny 2)
- Heihachi Mishima (Tekken)
- Jin Kazama (Tekken)
- Armor King (Tekken)
- KOS-MOS (Xenosaga)
- Captain Commando (Captain Commando)
- Demitri Maximoff (Darkstalkers)
- Mike Haggar (Final Fight)
- Sylphie (Forgotten Worlds)
- Arthur (Ghosts 'n Goblins)
- Ryu (Street Fighter)
- Ken Masters (Street Fighter)
- Rose (Street Fighter Alpha)
- Strider Hiryu (Strider)

== Development ==
Namco × Capcom was developed by Monolith Soft, then a subsidiary of Namco consisting of former Square employees who had gained fame through their work on the Xenosaga series and Baten Kaitos: Eternal Wings and the Lost Ocean. The game was directed and written by Soichiro Morizumi, a former employee of Banpresto and veteran of their Super Robot Wars franchise. The producer was Kouji Ishitani, who had served as an assistant director for Xenosaga Episode I and Baten Kaitos. Development began in 2003, and was initially proposed by Monolith Soft as an internal crossover of Namco characters for the company's 50th anniversary. This led to a roster of around 100 characters, but the team wanted a larger roster. To achieve this and create a "more exciting" experience, Namco reached out to Capcom to collaborate on the project. Capcom agreed, breaking the accepted reality of the time for large rival companies not to cooperate on a project. The game was Capcom's second major collaboration with another publisher following the SNK vs. Capcom series.

Namco × Capcom was Morizumi's first project for Monolith Soft, and he was in charge of writing the game's scenario. The main theme of the story was "Love", a theme common to Morizumi's later writing. The antagonistic Saya was originally written as "brutal and irritating", but the character's interactions with Xiaomu and the input of her voice actress Ai Orikasa changed Saya into a woman with a big sister persona. This forced multiple rewrites to the script. While he remembered it fondly in later years, Morizumi found the project exhausting. Shinichiro Okamoto, one of the game's executive producers, described the project as difficult for him and credited the rest of the staff with helping the game reach completion.

The character redesigns for Namco and Capcom characters were done by Takuji Kawano, an artist from the Soulcalibur series. The original characters were designed by Kazue Saito, who like Morizumi had worked on the Super Robot Wars franchise. Saito also designed the sprite graphics, and cut-in graphics for battles. The conversation portraits for characters were designed by veteran artist Kazunori Haruyama. The design of main protagonist Reiji was based on the builds of professional wrestlers. The game's opening animation was produced by Production I.G, famous for their work on anime and video game series.

Namco × Capcom was announced in January 2005; at this point, the game was 70% complete. When first announced, Mega Man producer Keiji Inafune praised the initiative behind the project. Namco × Capcom was released in Japan on May 26, 2005. The game was never released internationally, with several outlets citing both its large amount of text and a lack of worldwide recognition for many of the represented characters as potential reasons for this. A fan translation was created by a group called TransGen, made up of ten development team members and thirty beta testers. The translation was completed over two years, releasing in 2008.

=== Music ===
The soundtrack consists mainly of arrangements of themes from represented series. The only credited arranger is Yasunori Mitsuda, who worked on his own tracks for Xenosaga Episode I. The opening and ending themes were composed by Yuzo Koshiro. The game was Koshiro's first time writing vocal themes. Koshiro was brought in to work on Namco × Capcom due to Ishitani being a fan of his work, with the vocal themes being the composer's only contribution to the soundtrack. The lyrics were written by Morizumi and both songs were performed by Flair. A special soundtrack album containing selected tracks was released as a first-print bonus with early buyers of the game. A full soundtrack album, which included an extended version of "Brave New World" and karaoke versions of both songs, was released by Capcom's music label Suleputer on August 31, 2005.

== Reception ==
Reception

Review score
Publication	Score
Famitsu	28/40

During the weeks following its release, the game came among the top ten best-selling games, reaching sales of nearly 117,000 units by late June. By the end of the year, the game was among the top 100 best-selling games in Japan, with total sales of 131,600.

Japanese magazine Famitsu positively noted the use of kyōgen comedy routines in dialogue, but found other characters lacking development. One reviewer enjoyed the combination-based battles, but another faulted the game's balance. Gaming website Hardcore Gaming 101 said the game was "all about fan service", enjoying the character interactions but finding the gameplay itself very shallow. Siliconera similarly noted shallow and repetitive gameplay, but said that fans of both Namco and Capcom would enjoy the crossover elements.

Hirohiko Niizumi of GameSpot felt that players needed extensive background knowledge of the represented series to enjoy the game, but enjoyed the interactions between characters. He also noted the simplicity of the gameplay, attributed to the need for broad appeal. Anoop Gantayat, writing for IGN, found the visuals lacking despite the game's hardware, and called the story structure "pretty plain". He was also disappointed by the shallow RPG elements.

== Legacy ==
Following the release of Namco × Capcom, the two companies would collaborate on future projects, particularly Street Fighter X Tekken and the Mobile Suit Gundam VS series. The Namco × Capcom development team would later collaborate with Banpresto on the 2008 Nintendo DS game Super Robot Taisen OG Saga: Endless Frontier. They released its DS sequel Endless Frontier Exceed, in 2010.

Monolith Soft and Banpresto later co-developed the 2012 Nintendo 3DS title Project X Zone. Designed as a successor to Namco × Capcom with similar gameplay and narrative, Project X Zone combined characters from Sega franchises with returning ones from Namco and Capcom. Its 2015 sequel, Project X Zone 2, would be developed solely by Monolith Soft and feature additional collaborations with Nintendo franchises.
