= Morrigan Aensland =

- Darkstalkers character
- Morrigan in Darkstalkers Resurrection (2013)
- First game: Darkstalkers: The Night Warriors (1994)
- Designed by: Hiroshi Shibata; Akira Yasuda; Hiromi "Mori" Kotobuki (Q Kyoku) (sprites)
- Voiced by: English: Saffron Henderson (American animated series); Kathleen Barr (Japanese animated series); Siobhan Flynn (Marvel vs. Capcom 3, Ultimate MvC3, Marvel vs. Capcom Infinite, Teppen); Erin Fitzgerald (Cross Edge); Japanese: Yayoi Jinguji (games, 1994–2010); Rie Tanaka (games, 2011–present); Rei Sakuma (Japanese animated series, drama CD, Gunbird 2); Kikuko Inoue and Yumi Tōma (drama CDs)

In-universe information
- Species: Succubus
- Origin: Scotland
- Nationality: Scottish

Morrigan Aensland (Japanese: モリガン・アーンスランド, Hepburn: Morigan Ānsurando) is a character in Capcom's Darkstalkers series. Having debuted in 1994's Darkstalkers: The Night Warriors, she has since appeared in every game in the series and in various related media and merchandise, as well as in games outside the Darkstalkers line, including most entries in both Marvel vs. Capcom and SNK vs. Capcom.

Morrigan is a succubus and a powerful princess (later queen) of the demon realm Makai, who is very vain and lives for little more than the excitement of battle, but slowly begins to take her royal responsibilities more seriously despite her obsessive fascination with the human world. She has a sister-like split part named Lilith and a rival named Demitri Maximoff, and her moveset is reminiscent of Ryu.

== Concept and creation ==
Concept art pictures showing several design ideas for the character prior to Morrigan's introduction in Darkstalkers: The Night Warriors

Early in the development of Darkstalkers: The Night Warriors, Capcom had decided to include two female characters: a cute female vampire and a catgirl with massive breasts, the latter of which was originally intended to be the game's "sex appeal". According to story planner Haruo Murata, the former was planned to be the female figurehead of the game, similar to Chun-Li for Street Fighter II. Akira "Akiman" Yasuda oversaw the development process, and expected a character similar to the comic book character Vampirella. During the design process, Capcom producer Alex Jimenez suggested they instead make her a succubus, as the game already had a male vampire planned. As a result, the characters' roles shifted, with the catgirl Felicia becoming a cute character to offset the game's darker tones, while the succubus Morrigan became the game's sex symbol.

Her finalized appearance came from Hiroshi Shibata, a member of the game's Objects team. Morrigan is a woman with long green hair and bangs, and wears a black leotard that cups her breasts with a heart-shaped cutout beneath her cleavage. The upper straps of the leotard are lowered around her shoulders, with a white feather trip extending around her shoulders and cleavage. Her legs are covered by purple tights with a bat pattern on them, while matching sleeves which extend from the leotard straps to her middle finger, and black high heel boots cover her feet. Two large bat wings extend from her lower back, while a secondary smaller set extends from the sides of her head. In an early version of her design a white skull decal was intended to cover the crotch of the leotard, but was later removed. She stands 172 centimetres (5 ft 7 1/2 in) tall, and has measurements of 86–56–83 cm (34-22-33 in). Throughout her appearances, Morrigan has had several alternative outfits including a white unbuttoned white shirt and black pants, a fetish wear nurse's outfit, a Chinese cheongsam, and Japanese formal dresses.

Her initial standing sprite and several basic poses were designed by Yasuda, while the remainder of the animations were developed by Hiromi "Mori" Kotobuki. According to Yasuda, Kotobuki was so impressed by her standing pose that he paid a lot of attention to detail when animating the character, particularly giving her fingers movement during it. For her attacks and several of her movements, her wings were made to be a collection of shapeshifting bats that could form blades, drills and other items such as jetpacks to give her increased range and mobility. Her facial expressions when hit were meanwhile made more comical and less refined, something the development team felt suited the atmosphere of the Darkstalkers games. Meanwhile, her character portrays were designed by freelance illustrator Bengus, who added bags under her eyes to give her a more "Gothic" aesthetic. Though the development team was hesitant regarding this detail, Yasuda heavily praised it as exactly what he had been looking for with her design.

The name Morrigan was also suggested by Jimenez, who felt it would fit nobility. Elements such as her rivalry with fellow character Demitri Maximoff were conceived when Gamest magazine asked for additional details about the characters and their backstory after the release of the first game. Meanwhile, her home location was placed in Scotland to tie into the ancestry behind her character's name. According to Murata, he felt Morrigan did a great job "playing out the seductive succubus role", while Yasuda was pleased with the results as it provided Capcom with a character they could use again.

Morrigan's character has been voiced in most games by Yayoi Jinguji until 2011, when the role was taken over by Rie Tanaka. Morrigan's English voice was provided by Erin Fitzgerald for Cross Edge and by Siobhan Flynn for the Marvel vs. Capcom series.

== Appearances ==
=== Video games ===
Introduced in the 1994 fighting game Darkstalkers, Morrigan is the adopted succubus daughter of the demon realm's ruler. Though she is heir to that throne, she has little interest in it and instead routinely travels to the human realm for stimulation and excitement, and has a rivalry with the vampire Demitri Maximoff. Vampire Savior introduces Lilith, a fragment of Morrigan's soul that was previously sealed away but now given its own body and identity by the demon lord Jedah. Acting as Morrigan's "sister", the two would re-merge by the game's conclusion. Since her first appearance, Morrigan has appeared in other fighting games such as Super Gem Fighter Mini Mix / Pocket Fighter, as well as several Capcom-produced crossover games. These include Marvel vs. Capcom: Clash of Super Heroes and its sequels (with Lilith as an alternate palette swap version in the first game), Tatsunoko vs. Capcom, as well as Capcom vs. SNK: Millennium Fight 2000 and its related sequels.

In non-fighting games she appears in the crossover tactical role-playing game Namco × Capcom, Cross Edge and Project X Zone 2, and in puzzle games Super Puzzle Fighter II Turbo, Street Fighter Puzzle Spirits, and Puzzle Fighter, and in card games including SNK vs. Capcom: Card Fighters' Clash, Street Fighter × All Capcom, Street Fighter Battle Combination, and Onimusha Soul. Other game appearances include the Sega Dreamcast port of Psikyo's shoot 'em up game Gunbird 2, We Love Golf!, and Monster Hunter Frontier.

Furthermore, she has her own J2ME mobile game, Osanpo Morrigan (お散歩モリガン; 'Morrigan Taking a Walk'), Her collaboration guest appearances in mobile social games have included Samurai Kingdom and The Knights of Avalon among others, and her costume can be worn by Chun-Li in Street Fighter V and by Frank West in action-adventure game Dead Rising 4.

=== Other appearances ===
==== Other media ====
The 1997 anime OVA series Night Warriors: Darkstalkers' Revenge features Morrigan like her game appearances, portraying her as an idle rich member of a royal family who is more interested in going to Earth than in her duties. She often leaves at will out of mere boredom, much to the frustration of her guardians, elder men of the Aensland family. Her father, Belial, is not mentioned. Princess Morrigan is shown fighting the werewolf Jon Talbain in the opening of the first three episodes. She seeks to battle the vampire lord Demitri Maximoff when he attempts to return to Makai, but their duel with erotic undertones is interrupted when they are sensed by Huitzil. In the final episode, Morrigan goes to Earth after Demitri was bested by Pyron and she encounters him unconscious in the ruins of his castle. Demitri suddenly awakens and attempts to vampirise Morrigan, but she does not resist, much to his surprise. Morrigan tells Demitri that he may become the leader of Makai after all, since a change of leadership is needed to help its current disarray from falling into destruction. They both later observe Donovan's victory over Pyron. The anime's Morrigan was voiced by Rei Sakuma and dubbed into English by Kathleen Barr.

In the UDON Comics series Darkstalkers, Morrigan is portrayed as a malevolent, evil and amoral succubus like the games, who wants nothing more than to visit the human world to eat human souls and dreams, and completely ignores her duty as future ruler of the Makai Realm. Morrigan's attitude annoys her father Belial and gets her two servants, Lucien and Mudo, into trouble. Eventually she hears of Demitri's restoration, and goes to her father to warn him, only to find that he is about to die. She takes on the responsibility that she has often put aside and returns to the human world to fight Demitri, and prove herself worthy of the Makai Realm and the power that Belial sealed away many years ago. In the special issue Morrigan vs Demitri, it is implied that had Belial not sealed away her power, Morrigan might have evolved into a being similar to Pyron and destroyed the Earth and Makai. In the comics, Morrigan's bats are the souls of her human victims, which are not destroyed but remain alive inside her body in a state of eternal bliss and pleasure after she drains them. Aside from consuming souls, Morrigan has no qualms about murdering and taking advantage on humans yet despite this, she sees herself as simply taking people's souls in exchange for eternal bliss." She is also prominently featured in the followup series Darkstalkers: The Night Warriors, in which she, Demitri, Donovan, and Pyron all fight each other. In the later crossover series Street Fighter vs Darkstalkers, Morrigan keeps killing humans until she meets Lilith and finds out about Jedah's plan. Together with her enemy Chun-Li, as well as other uneasy allies, Morrigan and Lilith fight and defeat Jedah, and then they merge, finally restoring Morrigan to her full power. Despite everything she's done, Morrigan gets away with her crimes and is crowned queen of Makai.

Morrigan also appears in the comedic Darkstalkers drama CDs Vampire Knight (ヴァンパイア・ナイト), Darkness Mission (ダークネスミッション) and Dengeki CD Bunko EX: Vampire (電撃CD文庫EX ヴァンパイア), voiced by Rei Sakuma, Kikuko Inoue and Yumi Tōma, as well as in multiple yonkoma parody comics for that were largely compiled from fan submissions. She is often a lead character in various adaptations of Darkstalkers, such as the 1995 manga anthology Dark Angel (闇天使) and Akihiko Ureshino's series of gaiden novels, in particular in 1995's Witch of the Crimson Moon (紅い月の魔女) and 1996's Where the Souls Go (魂の還るところ). Morrigan stars in Run Ishida's 1996 manga which was published in English by Viz Comics in two different versions in 1998 and 2000 as Night Warriors: Darkstalkers' Revenge, spending the entire second half of the 2000 tradeback edition fighting Donovan, as well as in Mami Itou's 1997 Darkstalkers/Red Earth: Maleficarum, a Red Earth crossover manga published in English by UDON Comics in 2010 and was re-released in Japan in 2015. Hiroaki Wakamiya's 1996 manga Victor: Messenger of Doomsday (終末の使者 ビクトル) has Morrigan use her secret identity human persona of the biotechnology researcher Professor Mori to study the human world.

In the U.S. made non-canon cartoon series Darkstalkers, Morrigan was redesigned as character and changed into a villain, voiced by Saffron Henderson. Morrigan's character in the cartoon is jealous, rude, power-hungry and despising humans, especially men. She is implied to actually eat her victims and stated to be a direct descendant of the evil sorceress Morgan le Fay (with the series' protagonist, an original character named Harry Grimoire, being a descendant of Merlin). Her appearance was also altered, making her look slightly older and wear a less revealing costume; GamesRadar commented USA "gave her a look more appropriate for the Wicked Witch of the West than a sexy, soul-sucking, battle-loving demon."

== Promotion and reception ==
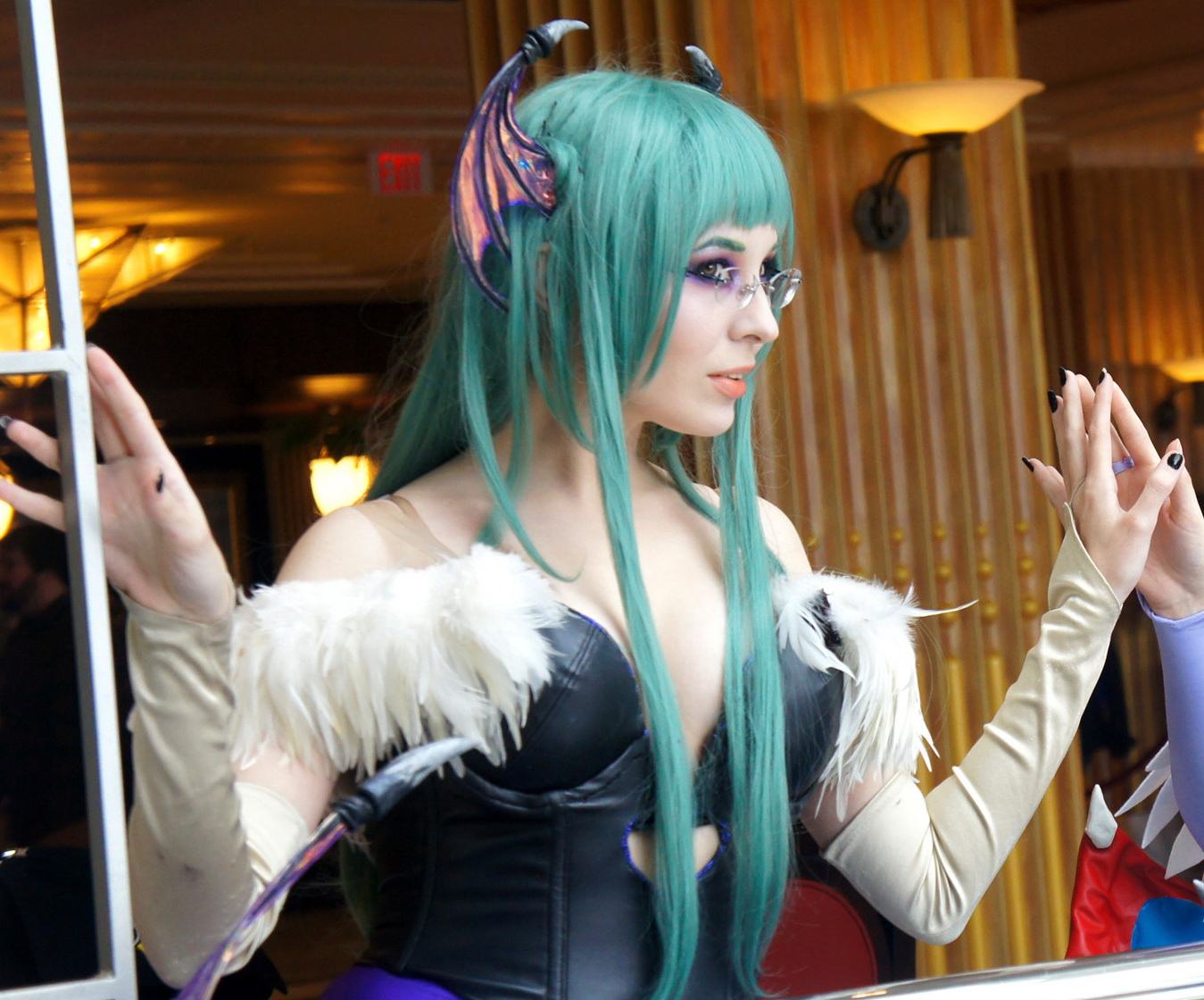
A Morrigan cosplayer in 2012

Scores of various figures and statuettes of Morrigan were produced by different manufacturers. These include the figures released by Capcom themselves, Diamond Select Toys, E246, Marvel, Max Factory, Pop Culture Shock Collectibles, and SOTA Toys among many others. Other Morrigan-themed merchandise include Capcom's wall scrolls and posters, T-shirts, covers, a large microfiber towel, and so forth.

In 1996, Mean Machines Sega described her as "one of the most bewitching girl characters ever to appear in gaming", noting her large Japanese fanbase which included men and women. Morrigan is widely seen as the most iconic character of Darkstalkers, arguably even more than the franchise itself, and one of the most popular female characters of video games in general. Anthony Gramuglia of CBR noted that Morrigan's popularity not only stemmed from her character, but also the character's popularity in cosplay and fan-art communities. Helen McCarthy's 2009 book 500 Essential Anime Movies: The Ultimate Guide additionally cited Morrigan as an example of the popularity of the Darkstalkers character designs, with fans frequently cosplaying as the character at various conventions since the original game's release.

Since her debut, Morrigan has been a popular character, resulting in the creation of large amounts of fan works, such as statuetes, cosplays and fan art. Morrigan has featured in many doujinshi unofficial self-published content, including erotic comics and pornographic films. Manga artist Hiroaki Samura, creator of the manga Blade of the Immortal, released his own doujin, Night of the Succubus. Meanwhile, Korean video game artist and Shift Up founder Kim Hyung Tae stated her design alongside Lilith's led him to "see the unique allure of women wearing tights", something that heavily impacted his character designs afterward.

M. Mar Martínez-Oña and Ana M. Muñoz-Muñoz cited Morrigan as an example of iconography of Lilith, who is traditionally depicted as a "highly eroticized devil, usually figured with horns and wings". They cited a statement by Dr. Vicent Francesc Zuriaga Senent, who argued modern depictions of devils often showed them as not something to be feared, but to be desired.

== See also ==
- List of succubi in fiction
