= Cross Edge =

2008 video game

- North American PlayStation 3 box art
- Developer: Idea Factory
- Publishers: PlayStation 3: JP: Compile Heart; NA/EU: NIS America; AU: Koei; Xbox 360: JP: Compile Heart
- Platforms: PlayStation 3, Xbox 360
- Release: PlayStation 3: JP: September 25, 2008; NA: May 26, 2009; EU: September 18, 2009; AU: September 28, 2009; Xbox 360: JP: October 1, 2009
- Genre: Tactical role-playing
- Mode: Single-player

Cross Edge (Note: クロスエッジ (Japanese: Kurosu Ejji)) is a role-playing video game originally for the PlayStation 3. The game was developed by Idea Factory with characters from games by Capcom, Nippon Ichi Software, Bandai Namco, and Gust Corporation. Released on September 25, 2008, in Japan, the title features turn-based battles, a plot that involves rescuing souls, and the ability to dress the female characters of the player's party in a wide variety of outfits. It was later ported to the Xbox 360 in Japan under the title Cross Edge Dash. (Note: クロスエッジ ダッシュ (Kurosu Ejji Dasshu))

Cross Edge features characters from Darkstalkers, Disgaea, Ar Tonelico: Melody of Elemia, Spectral Souls: Resurrection of the Ethereal Empires, Blazing Souls, Atelier Marie and Mana Khemia 2: Fall of Alchemy. NIS America published the game in North America, and it was released for that region on May 26, 2009.

== Gameplay ==
Cross Edge is a traditional Japanese role-playing game complete with a world map, random battles, level grinding, item combining/creation using alchemy, etc. It also features heroes and villains from game franchises published by Gust, Capcom, Nippon Ichi, Namco Bandai and Idea Factory. As players set about freeing the trapped souls supporting the nightmare world that they are stuck in, they engage in turn-based team battles. Players must enlist characters from previous games to join in party-based battles. Success in these battles is based on the ability to string together specific moves into chain attack sequences, which in turn unlock even stronger combinations when successful. Players can also increase their characters' stats and abilities by acquiring additional costumes called "forms" and redressing their characters in them. Female characters' physical appearances can also be changed based on the form they're wearing.

The goal of the game is to release souls. Players can find and collect souls by searching around area maps. Exposure to souls can grant players items or unlock events. Along with soul related events, maps will also point players to other helpful locations such as event points, points at which other events may occur, and save points, where players can save the game as well as buy, sell and trade items.

== Characters ==
=== Original characters ===
- Yūto Kannagi (神薙 勇刀, Kannagi Yūto)

The main hero. His name in the North American version was changed to York Neely. He is a childhood friend with Troy and Miko and, thanks to Miko, is a straight A student. His father is renowned fighter and York is a master of jujitsu. However, he began to tire of "obsolete" fighting styles and got into gunplay instead.

- Mikoto Aiba (相羽 命, Aiba Mikoto)

The main heroine; her first name is shortened to Miko in the North American version. A friend of Yūto and Tōya. She lives with York since her parents died and had the ability to "see spirits" but it faded and she became a normal girl. She fights with a naginata and likes to clean Yūto's room.

- May (メイ, Mei)

A character that Yūto met in the world. She is a non-player character that frees souls from the various realms that are explored. Despite her childish demeanor, she surprises the group with her maturity and open-mindedness.

- Vivi (ヴィヴィ, Vivi)

One of the caretakers of the world. He is the oldest among the triplets, yet his shy and weak personality leads to him being bullied and pushed around by his younger siblings. Vivi is also the only one who can hear the "will" of the Empyreal One.

- Iruma (イルマ, Iruma)

One of the caretakers of the world. She, Vivi, and Eruma are triplets. In the North American version, her name is Cece. She tries to hide her true doubts and feelings behind a strong-willed personality, and often described as the voice of rationality between the triplets. Iruma also acts the most maturely among them, and designates orders to the Twelve Knights according to the Empyreal One's will.

- Eruma (エルマ, Eruma)

The youngest of the triplets. In the North American version, her name is Mimi. She is quite impish and playfully cruel, thinking of others around her except Iruma as toys and the chain of events happening is only a game in her eyes. The one thing Vivi fears more than anything is when Eruma starts to get bored.

- Anesha (アネーシャ, Anēsha)
- Judas (ジューダス, Jūdasu)
- Tōya Ijūin (伊集院 冬夜, Ijūin Tōya)

Yūto's best friend. In the North American version, his name is Troy.

- Raizen
- Lazarus

One of the Twelve Knights. He's a carefree, eternally optimistic gunman. He often appears bored and lazy, but his ability with a gun is amazing. He's always excited to find a challenger willing to fight to the death. But until now, he never really took fighting seriously. If his enemy is weakened, he will refuse the killing blow even if given a direct order. Surprisingly, his strength can nearly match Judas's, which may explain why he often seems uninterested in his surroundings.

- Augustine

The most cruel, merciless, and brutal of the Twelve Knights. He's obsessed with hunting down those who are brought into his world, and will achieve his goals by any means necessary. This bloodlust causes him to often butt heads with Raizen. He's not happy that certain outsiders have been accepted as part of the Twelve Knights, despite the facade he puts on in front of his superiors. In his eyes, these newcomers are simply stealing his rightful kills.

In the post game, he is called Augee or Augustink.

=== Atelier Marie characters ===
- Marlone (マルローネ, Marurōne)

She is the main character and only representative of Atelier Marie and is known for having the lowest GPA in the academy. Her nickname is Marie. This is Marie's second appearance in North America, after her costume cameo in Ar tonelico: Melody of Elemia, but technically her first physical appearance as a character.

=== Mana-Khemia 2 characters ===
- Liliane Vehlendorf (リリアーヌ・ヴェーレンドルフ, Ririānu Vērendorufu)

In the North American version, her nickname is Lily.

- Rozeluxe Meitzen (ロゼリュクス・マイツェン, Rozeryukusu Maitsen)

In the North American version, his name is changed to Raze.

- Whim (ウィム, Wimu)

Liliane's maid who has to put up with her temper tantrums from time to time. She is actually a water mana.

- Rewrich Wallach (ルゥリッヒ・バラハ, Rūrihhi Baraha)

In the North American version, his name is changed to Reicher.

=== Darkstalkers characters ===
- Demitri Maximoff (デミトリ・マキシモフ, Demitori Makishimofu)

One of the main characters of the Darkstalkers series alongside Morrigan. He is a vampire that can shape-shift into a bat-like monster and lives as a noble of the Makai.

- Morrigan Aensland (モリガン・アーンスランド, Morigan Ānsurando)

One of the main characters of the Darkstalkers series alongside Demitri. Morrigan is a succubus who fights for her desires and pleasure. She is the first recruited character that joins York and Miko, and also the first to figure out how the Cross Edge world works.

- Felicia (フェリシア, Ferishia)

A cheerful and kind-hearted catgirl who never wants to hurt anyone.

- Lilith (リリス, Ririsu)

A younger succubus who is exceedingly cruel. She is part of Morrigan's soul which was split in two years ago in the Makai.

- Jedah Dohma (ジェダ・ドーマ, Jeda Dōma)

The head of the Dohma clan of the Makai. He constantly views existence as a stage on which everyone must perform, and has a habit of making eloquent if not longwinded speeches.

=== Disgaea characters ===
- Etna (エトナ, Etona)
- Prinny (プリニー, Purinī)

=== Ar Tonelico characters ===
- Lyner Barsett (ライナー・バルセルト, Rainā Baruseruto)
- Aurica Nestmile (オリカ・ネストミール, Orika Nesutomīru)
- Misha Arsellec Lune (彌紗・アルトセルク・リューン, Misha Arutoseruku Ryūn)
- Shurelia (シュレリア, Shureria)
- Ayatane Michitaka (絢胤 箕嵩 (アヤタネ・ミチタカ), Ayatane Michitaka)
- Bourd Rade (ボルド・レード, Borudo Rēdo)

=== Spectral Souls characters ===
- Meu (ミュウ, Myū)

Meu is quite energetic and very outspoken, as she is stubborn and can be silly at times. She strives to become a great hero like her grandfather and has much potential, certain she will become one.

=== Blazing Souls characters ===
- Zelos (ゼロス, Zerosu)

== Music ==
The opening theme for the game is Blade of Tears by Haruka Shimotsuki.

== Reception ==
Reception

Aggregate score
| Aggregator | Score |
|---|---|
| Metacritic | PS3: 52/100 |

Review scores
| Publication | Score |
|---|---|
| Famitsu | 23 out of 40 |
| GameZone | 4.5/10 |
| IGN | 3.5/10 |
| Official U.S. PlayStation Magazine | 3/5 |
| Tech-Gaming | B |
| Diehard GameFAN | Very Good |
| GameShark | D− |

Cross Edge received mixed reviews. PlayStation Official Magazine US said that "From dialogue that loads one line at a time to the lack of PS3-level graphics (high-res static art aside), everything seems like a remnant from the early 2000s." IGN stated that "A game that could have been an entertaining compilation of iconic Japanese characters turned out to be a frustrating, awkward mess of menus, gameplay imbalances and annoying dialogue scenes." Sales of the game totalled just 44,246 units in the region by the end of 2008 according to Famitsu.
