= Darkstalkers Chronicle: The Chaos Tower =

2000 video game

- North American cover art by Kinu Nishimura
- Developer: Capcom Production Studio 5
- Publisher: Capcom
- Series: Darkstalkers
- Platforms: Dreamcast; PlayStation Portable
- Release: Dreamcast: JP: August 10, 2000; PlayStation Portable: JP: December 12, 2004; NA: March 17, 2005; PAL: September 1, 2005
- Genre: Fighting
- Modes: Single-player, multiplayer

Darkstalkers Chronicle: The Chaos Tower, known in Japan as Vampire Chronicle: The Chaos Tower, (Note: Japanese: ヴァンパイア クロニクル ザ カオスタワー, Hepburn: Vanpaia Kuronikuru Za Kaosu Tawā) is a fighting game by Capcom for the PlayStation Portable. It was released on December 12, 2004, alongside the PSP at launch in Japan, and was also a launch title in North America and PAL regions in 2005. It is a port of the Japan-only Dreamcast game Vampire Chronicle for Matching Service, which in turn is a title that allows players to choose their fighting style from all five Darkstalkers/Vampire arcade games that were released in the 1990s.

== Gameplay ==
The game has all the characters from prior installments of the series and includes all the endings and moves from the games: Darkstalkers: The Night Warriors, Night Warriors: Darkstalkers' Revenge / Vampire Hunter, Darkstalkers 3 / Vampire Savior, and the Japan-only arcade updates Vampire Hunter 2 and Vampire Savior 2. The complete soundtracks from all three games are also selectable based on play style. The levels, selection screen, and character endings are all from Vampire Savior 2.

== Reception ==
Reception

Aggregate score
Aggregator	Score
Metacritic	74 /100

Review scores
Publication	Score
GameRevolution	3/5
GameSpot	8.1/10
GameSpy	3.5/5
IGN	7/10

Famitsu magazine gave the original Dreamcast version of the game a score of 31 out of 40. Darkstalkers Chronicle: The Chaos Tower has the Metacritic score of 74 out of 100.

It was one of the three games nominated by GameSpot for the title of the Best Fighting Game of 2005, as (at the time) "probably the best portable fighting game ever made". In 2010, GamesRadar included Darkstalkers Chronicle among five PSP "essentials that are genuinely essential", adding: "This 2D fighter is seldom mentioned these days, which is frankly criminal". In 2011, Complex ranked it as the 41st best fighting game of all time.
