= Kan Tokumaru =

Japanese voice actor (1941–2011)

- 徳丸 完
- Born: Kimio Murano (村野 公男); May 26, 1941; Shizuoka, Japan
- Died: March 6, 2011 (aged 69); Japan
- Occupation: Voice actor
- Years active: 1960s–2010
- Agent: Arts Vision

Kan Tokumaru (徳丸 完, Tokumaru Kan; May 26, 1941 – March 6, 2011) was a Japanese voice actor who was best known as the voice of Anakaris, Bishamon, Sasquatch, and Victor von Gerdenheim (Darkstalkers).

== Filmography ==
=== Anime ===
List of voice performances in anime
| Year | Title | Role | Notes | Source |
|---|---|---|---|---|
| 1975 | Tekkaman: The Space Knight | Pegas | | |
| 1995 | Virtua Fighter | Clive Maroni | | |
| 1997 | Berserk | Snake Baron | ep.1 | |
| 2003 | Wolf's Rain | Retrieval Squad Commander | | |
| | Case Closed | Detective | | |

=== Video games ===
- Vampire: The Night Warriors (1994) – Anakaris, Bishamon, Sasquatch and Victor von Gerdenheim
- Vampire Hunter: Darkstalkers' Revenge (1995) – (Anakaris, Bishamon, Sasquatch, Victor von Gerdenheim)
- Street Fighter III (1997) – Oro
- Street Fighter III: 2nd Impact (1997) – Oro
- Vampire Savior: The Lord of Vampire (1998) – (Anakaris, Bishamon, Sasquatch, Victor von Gerdenheim)
- Strider 2 (1999) – Grandmaster Meio
- Marvel vs. Capcom 2: New Age of Heroes (2000) – Anakaris, Amingo, The Abyss
- Shinobi (2002) – (Hiruko Ubusuna (Old))
- Capcom Fighting Jam (2004) – Anakaris

=== Dubbing Roles ===
==== Live-action ====
- The Amityville Horror (1982 NTV edition) (Father Bolen (Don Stroud))
- Beverly Hills Cop III (Ellis DeWald (Timothy Carhart))
- Death Wish (1980 TV Asahi edition) (Jack Toby (Steven Keats))
- Dog Day Afternoon (1979 Fuji TV edition) (FBI Agent Murphy (Lance Henriksen))
- The Goonies (1988 TBS edition) (Jake Fratelli (Robert Davi))

==== Animation ====
- Iron Man (Dum Dum Dugan)
