= Noritaka Funamizu =

Japanese video game designer

- 船水 紀孝
- Born: December 14, 1965 (age 60); Japan
- Occupations: Video game designer, director, producer
- Years active: 1985–present
- Employer(s): Capcom (1985–2004); Crafts & Meister (2004–present)

Noritaka Funamizu (船水 紀孝, Funamizu Noritaka; born December 14, 1965), sometimes credited as Poo, is a Japanese video game designer, director and producer formerly employed by Capcom. In 2004, he left Capcom to help found Crafts & Meister.

== Career ==
Funamizu was employed by Capcom in 1985. Prior to that, he wrote for Beep as a part-time contributor until he was invited into the company by senior staff. When he joined Capcom, he befriended fellow Capcom designer Yoshiki Okamoto while playing a game of catchball. During the late 1980s and up until the mid-1990s, Funamizu designed and co-designed several of the company's arcade games, including games in the Street Fighter series (particularly Super Street Fighter II and the Street Fighter Alpha series).

Funamizu was later promoted to General Manager of Capcom's Production Studio 1 which produced several of the company's arcade and consumer titles. He, along with producer Katsuhiro Sudo left Capcom in April 2004 to form Crafts & Meister.

== Ludography ==
Year	Title	Credited as
1985	Gun.Smoke	Character design
1986	Side Arms	Game designer
1987	1943: The Battle of Midway	Game designer
1988	Forgotten Worlds	Game designer
1989	Dynasty Wars	Game designer
1989	U.N. Squadron	Game designer
1990	1941: Counter Attack	Game designer
1990	Mega Twins	Director
1990	Nemo	Game designer
1992	Varth: Operation Thunderstorm	Director
1992	Warriors of Fate	Game designer
1993	The Punisher	Director
1993	Super Street Fighter II	Game designer
1994	Super Street Fighter II Turbo	Game designer
1994	Armored Warriors	Special advisor
1994	X-Men: Children of the Atom	Game designer
1995	Street Fighter Alpha: Warriors' Dreams	Game designer
1996	Street Fighter Alpha 2	Producer, game designer
1996	Super Puzzle Fighter II Turbo	General producer
1996	Mega Man 2: The Power Fighters	General producer
1996	Star Gladiator	General producer
1996	X-Men vs. Street Fighter	General producer
1996	Mega Man 8	General producer
1996	Red Earth	General producer
1997	Street Fighter III: New Generation	General producer
1997	Battle Circuit	General producer
1997	Vampire Savior	General producer
1997	Marvel Super Heroes vs. Street Fighter	General producer
1997	Capcom Sports Club	General producer
1997	Mega Man X4	General producer
1997	Mega Man Battle & Chase	General producer
1997	Super Gem Fighter Mini Mix	General producer
1997	Street Fighter III 2nd Impact	General producer
1997	Breath of Fire III	General producer
1998	Marvel vs. Capcom	General producer
1998	JoJo's Venture	General producer
1998	Street Fighter EX2	Motion designer
1998	Resident Evil 2	general producer
1998	Street Fighter Alpha 3	Producer, game designer
1998	Mega Man & Bass	General producer
1998	Plasma Sword	Producer
1998	Tech Romancer	General producer
1999	Jojo's Bizarre Adventure	General producer
1999	Giga Wing	Executive producer
1999	Street Fighter III 3rd Strike	General producer
1999	Strider 2	General producer
1999	Resident Evil 3	General producer
1999	SNK vs. Capcom: The Match of the Millennium	Supervisor
1999	Power Stone	General producer
1999	Magical Tetris Challenge	General producer
1999	The Misadventures of Tron Bonne	General producer
1999	Dino Crisis	General producer
2000	Spawn: In the Demon's Hand	General producer
2000	Project Justice	General producer
2000	Power Stone 2	General producer
2000	Breath of Fire IV	Executive producer
2000	Marvel vs. Capcom 2: New Age of Heroes	General producer
2000	Capcom vs. SNK: Millennium Fight 2000	General producer
2000	Resident Evil: Code Veronica	General producer
2001	One Piece Mansion	General producer
2001	Mobile Suit Gundam: Federation vs. Zeon	General producer
2001	Capcom vs. SNK 2	General producer
2001	The Legend of Zelda: Oracle of Seasons and Oracle of Ages	Producer
2001	Heavy Metal: Geomatrix	General producer
2002	GioGio no Kimyō na Bōken: Ōgon no Kaze	General producer
2002	Auto Modellista	General producer
2003	Hyper Street Fighter II	Executive director
2003	Gotcha Force	General producer
2003	Devil May Cry 2	Executive producer
2003	Chaos Legion	Supervisor
2003	Resident Evil Outbreak	Executive producer
2004	Monster Hunter	Executive producer
2004	Resident Evil Outbreak File #2	Event planner
2005	Super Dragon Ball Z	Executive director
2011	Earth Seeker	Designer
