= Super Puzzle Fighter II Turbo =

1996 video game

- Japanese arcade flyer
- Developers: Capcom; Backbone Entertainment (PS3, X360)
- Publisher: Capcom: PAL: Virgin Interactive Entertainment
- Producers: Noritaka Funamizu; Takashi Sado; Monte Singman (PS1 U.S. version)
- Designers: Naoto Ohta; Katsuhiro Eguchi
- Programmer: Monte Singman (PS1 U.S. version)
- Platforms: Arcade, PlayStation, Sega Saturn, Windows, Dreamcast, Game Boy Advance, mobile phone, PlayStation 3, Xbox 360
- Release: June 1996: Arcade; JP/NA: June 1996 PlayStation; JP: December 6, 1996; NA: January 22, 1997; EU: April 1997 Saturn; JP: December 6, 1996; NA: February 28, 1997; EU: April 1997 Windows; NA: 1998 Dreamcast; JP: July 5, 2001 Game Boy Advance; EU: March 28, 2003; NA: March 31, 2003; JP: Cancelled Mobile phone 2006 (first version) 2010 (second version) PlayStation 3, Xbox 360 August 30, 2007
- Genre: Puzzle
- Modes: Single-player, multiplayer
- Arcade system: CP System II

Super Puzzle Fighter II Turbo, released in Japan as Super Puzzle Fighter II X (Note: Japanese: スーパーパズルファイターII X), is a 1996 tile-matching puzzle video game developed and published by Capcom for arcades. The game's title is a play on Super Street Fighter II Turbo (called Super Street Fighter II X in Japan), as there were no other Puzzle Fighter games at the time, and the game includes music and interface elements spoofing the Street Fighter Alpha and Darkstalkers games. It was a response to Compile and Sega's Puyo Puyo 2 that had been sweeping the Japanese arcade scene.

A high-definition remake version titled Super Puzzle Fighter II Turbo HD Remix, is available on Xbox 360 and PlayStation 3. A successor, Puzzle Fighter, was released for mobile devices in 2017. Super Puzzle Fighter II Turbo HD Remix was made backwards compatible on Xbox One in June 2019. In 2022, the game was re-released in both the Capcom Fighting Collection and Capcom Arcade 2nd Stadium compilations on Nintendo Switch, PlayStation 4, Windows and Xbox One.

== Gameplay ==
Puzzle Fighter is a puzzle game which is similar to the Sega arcade game Baku Baku Animal. As in the Capcom arcade game Pnickies, the player controls pairs of blocks ("gems" in game parlance) that drop into a pit-like playfield (twelve blocks tall by six blocks wide, with the fourth column from the left being thirteen blocks high). In Puzzle Fighter, however, gems can only be eliminated by coming into contact with a Crash Gem of the same color, which eliminates all adjacent gems of that color, setting up the potential for huge chain reactions. When gems are eliminated, "garbage blocks" called Counter Gems drop into the opponent's playfield; these will eventually become normal gems, but only after they count down to zero. Most Counter Gems start at "5" and are reduced by one each time a new pair of gems is dropped on that board. The only way to eliminate Counter Gems before they become normal gems is to place a Crash Gem of that color nearby so it eliminates at least one normal gem. If this is done, all Counter Gems immediately adjacent to the Crash Gem will be taken out as well. Additionally, gems of the same color that form squares or rectangles (of at least two blocks tall and wide) in the pit become a giant Power Gem of that size and color; eliminating these as part of a combo increases the number of Counter Gems that would otherwise normally appear on the opponent's board. The only other type of piece to appear is a diamond, which eliminates all the gems—normal, Power, Counter, and Crash alike—of whichever color gem it lands on. (This, too, will cause Counter Gems to appear on the opponent's board. The diamond is supposed to create half the number of Counter Gems as a normal chain reaction. However, there is a bug that allows players to bypass this reduction.) The diamond piece appears every 25 pieces.

Puzzle Fighter borrowed rules originally found in Puyo Puyo 2 called Sousai (Garbage Countering). This will allow a player to counter and negate garbage being sent by the opponent with chains of their own. Sousai can also be used to send garbage back to the opponent, known as Garbage overflow.

During the game, super deformed versions of various characters from Capcom's two main fighting game series (Street Fighter and Darkstalkers) act out a comical battle based on how the game is going. Every time one player sends Counter Gems to their opponent, their character will perform a typical fighting-game action, anything from a taunt to a special move. The more Counter Gems the player sends over, the "bigger" the move the character will perform. These animations, however, are purely cosmetic and have no actual bearing on the gameplay other than to indicate the magnitude of the counters.

The game continues until one player's field reaches the top of its fourth column (which is where all new gems first appear). That player is the loser.

The Dreamcast version of the game adds three separate modes: X-Mode, Y-Mode and Z-Mode. Whereas X-mode is the original version of the core game, Y-Mode and Z-Mode have more drastic gameplay changes. Y-Mode makes the gems break as soon as three or more are aligned in a row, column, or diagonally, like in Columns, whereas Z-mode makes lines of gems rise up from the bottom of the screen, and the player controls a 2x2 square cursor, with which they rotate already-placed pieces, similarly to Tetris Attack.

== Characters ==
The puzzle fighters on the roster are crossing over from Capcom's two major fighting game sequels that were recent at the time, such as Street Fighter Alpha 2 and Night Warriors: Darkstalkers' Revenge. A spin-off that uses most of these character sprites called Super Gem Fighter Mini Mix was released in 1997.

- Ryu from Street Fighter
- Ken from Street Fighter
- Chun-Li from Street Fighter II: The World Warrior
- Sakura from Street Fighter Alpha 2
- Morrigan from Darkstalkers: The Night Warriors
- Donovan from Night Warriors: Darkstalkers' Revenge
- Hsien-Ko (Lei-Lei in Japan) from Night Warriors: Darkstalkers' Revenge
- Felicia from Darkstalkers: The Night Warriors

=== Consoles ===
- Mei-Ling (Lin Lin in Japan) from Night Warriors: Darkstalkers' Revenge
- Anita from Night Warriors: Darkstalkers' Revenge

=== Hidden characters ===
- Dan from Street Fighter Alpha: Warriors' Dreams
- Akuma (Gouki in Japan) from Super Street Fighter II Turbo
- Devilotte from Cyberbots: Full Metal Madness

== Reception ==
Reception

Review scores
Publication	Score
AllGame	4/5 (PC); 4/5 (PS1); 4/5 (SAT)
Electronic Gaming Monthly	7.375/10 (SAT)
Eurogamer	9/10 (GBA)
GameSpot	7.6/10 (SAT); 7.7/10 (GBA)
GameSpy	82% (GBA)
IGN	8/10 (GBA); 9/10 (PS1)
Jeuxvideo.com	16/20 (GBA)
Mean Machines Sega	87% (SAT)
Mega Fun	69% (SAT)
MeriStation	7/10 (PC)
Next Generation	4/5 (ARC); 4/5 (PS1)
Video Games (DE)	77% (PS1)
NeXt Level	90% (PS1); 90% (SAT)
Saturn+	93% (SAT)
Sega Saturn Magazine	86% (SAT)

=== Arcade ===
In Japan, Game Machine listed Super Puzzle Fighter II Turbo on their August 1, 1996 issue as being the sixth most-successful arcade game of the month, outperforming titles such as Tekken 2.

The arcade game received positive reviews upon release. Reviewing the arcade version, a reviewer for Next Generation commented: "The gameplay is ferociously competitive, unfairly addicting, and as intuitive as riding a bike (once you've got the hang of it), and due to luck factor, the favor swings numerous times from winner to loser and back until the very last gem drops". Additionally praising the cutesy character art and the Capcom in-jokes incorporated into the backgrounds and soundtrack, he scored it four out of five stars. Computer and Video Games compared it favorably with Tetris and Columns, but said the "big difference is the way that gems of the same colour made into squares will join to make one giant bonus gem." They said that, "when it's this much fun, it's well worth a go."

=== Ports ===
The Saturn and PlayStation versions received generally positive reviews. Shawn Smith, Dan Hsu and Crispin Boyer of Electronic Gaming Monthly commended the game's kid-style characters, addictive gameplay, and elements of fighting game strategy. However, Dan Hsu and Sushi-X both criticized that it is too easy to drop a large number of unremovable blocks on an opponent's side, making the game too unbalanced, and Sushi-X deemed it overall average. Glenn Rubenstein of GameSpot was pleased by the fighting game strategy elements, graphic style, hidden in-jokes and Easter eggs, and replay value, and recommended it for puzzle game fans. GamePro's Para Noid was enthusiastic about the game, writing: "The one-player modes are entertaining, but the two-player head-to-head mode is where you get intense puzzle action, providing hours of enjoyment. Street Fighter and puzzle-game fans alike should definitely give this game a look." Major Mike of the same magazine likewise said that the game is addictive fun, particularly in two-player mode.

Unlike Dan Hsu and Sushi-X, a Next Generation critic argued that the ease of dropping stacks of blocks which cannot be removed until they turn back to regular gems adds to the excitement and strategy of the gameplay. However, he criticized the dull-witted battle quips and said the Street Fighter characters are out-of-place, suggesting they had only been included for their marketing value. Contrarily, Stephen Fulljames commented in Sega Saturn Magazine: "Puzzle Fighter's main strength is its World Warrior branding. Without it, it would be just another puzzle game, and a slightly flawed one at that. With it, it becomes an altogether more worthy product." He praised the selectable characters, fighting game elements, various play modes and graphics, while criticizing the player's overdependence on the appearance of trigger gems.

=== Accolades ===
Electronic Gaming Monthly named the Saturn and PlayStation versions a runner up for "Puzzle Game of the Year" (behind Bust-A-Move 3) at their 1997 Editors' Choice Awards.

In 2004, Super Puzzle Fighter II Turbo was inducted into GameSpot's list of the greatest games of all time.

== Super Puzzle Fighter II Turbo HD Remix ==
Super Puzzle Fighter II Turbo HD Remix is a downloadable game in the Puzzle Fighter franchise for PlayStation 3 (via PlayStation Network) and Xbox 360 (via Xbox Live Arcade). HD Remix was announced to include several graphical upgrades in the interface, character sprites, and levels.

Super Puzzle Fighter II Turbo: HD Remix has updated high-definition graphics. Each of the four colours of the gems have been associated with an element and given a new animation. Backgrounds and characters have also been redrawn, while the character sprites have been upscaled via Pixel-art scaling algorithms.

Super Puzzle Fighter II Turbo HD Remix supports four players in multiplayer, spectator mode, online play and rankings. Also featured are the three gameplay modes included in the Dreamcast version: X-Mode, Y-Mode and Z-Mode, and an additional X' ("X dash") Mode which rebalances several characters' drop patterns for better competitive play.

On June 10, 2019, Super Puzzle Fighter II Turbo HD Remix was released on Xbox One through backwards compatibility support of the original Xbox 360 version.

Super Puzzle Fighter II Turbo HD Remix is included in Capcom Digital Collection.

=== Changes from the original ===
- Several characters were rebalanced by having their gem drop patterns altered.
- Crash Gems now have elemental visual effects associated with them. Red gems are now Fire, Green gems are Wind, Blue gems are Water and Yellow gems are Lightning. This does not affect gameplay and is purely a visual alteration.
- In the original Puzzle Fighter, the tempo of the music would gradually speed up the closer the player or their opponent was to losing the match. HD Remix does not feature this.
- In addition to the standard difficulty selection (Easy, Normal, and Hard), home console ports of Puzzle Fighter let the player alter the default speed in which gems would fall (marked by a number of stars up to five). This setting was removed for HD Remix.
- New game modes were added. X is the original Puzzle Fighter with original drop patterns, X' is the rebalanced version, Y is a connect-three based variant of the game, and Z is a completely different pre-generated rotating block style game.
- A challenge mode called "Street Puzzle" was available in the original home console ports of Puzzle Fighter. In it, the player was tasked with defeating specific characters as a means to unlock bonus content. HD Remix removes "Street Puzzle" mode entirely, as well as most of the bonus content it would unlock. What little bonus content was not cut from HD Remix is available from the beginning of the game.
- Dan's "Saikyo-Ryu Dojo" Tutorial has been removed, which was an "Attract" demo in the arcade version and a tutorial mode accessible from the main menu in previous home releases. In it, Dan would provide a comedic demonstration to show the player the basics of playing Puzzle Fighter. In HD Remix, it has been replaced with a four-page text-only tutorial under "How to Play" in Options.
- The original Puzzle Fighter contained a number of different "Win Taunts" that a character would pick at random to say to the losing player after a match. HD Remix removes most of the "Win Taunts", leaving only one per character.
- There are a number of palette errors in the sprites themselves. For example, during the Intermission featuring Akuma in his cave, all of the demons in the background have garbled colors.
- The "diamond trick" glitch has been eliminated. Attacks using the diamond are always at 80% strength instead of 50% (used normally) or 100% (using a glitch).
- Ken's stage is now a beach featuring chibi versions of other Street Fighter characters. In the original Puzzle Fighter, his stage was the city street setting from Street Fighter Alpha.
- Ryu's stage is now his snowy stage from Street Fighter Alpha 2. In the original Puzzle Fighter, his stage was a night time version of his stage from Street Fighter Alpha.
- There is now a gem editor mode which allows players to create their own custom drop patterns. The custom patterns are only allowed in specific gameplay modes.
- An online multiplayer function was added.

=== Reception ===
Reception

Aggregate score
Aggregator	Score
Metacritic	83/100 (X360); 82/100 (PS3)

Review scores
Publication	Score
Eurogamer	9/10
GamesMaster	88%
GameSpot	7.5/10
GamesRadar+	4/5
GameZone	8.7/10
IGN	8.5/10
Official Xbox Magazine (UK)	8/10
Official Xbox Magazine (US)	8.5/10
TeamXbox	9.1/10
