= Super Dragon Ball Z =

2005 video game

- North American PlayStation 2 cover art featuring Vegeta and Goku
- Developers: Arika; Crafts & Meister
- Publishers: Arcade; Banpresto; PlayStation 2: JP/EU: Namco Bandai Games; NA/AU: Atari
- Director: Akira Nishitani
- Composers: SuperSweep (Note: Music co-composed by SuperSweep members Shinji Hosoe, Ayako Saso, Yousuke Yasui, Masashi Yano, and Wataru Ishibashi); Yasuhisa Watanabe; Hiroto Saitoh; Takayuki Aihara
- Series: Dragon Ball
- Platforms: Arcade; PlayStation 2
- Release: Arcade: JP: December 22, 2005; EU: 2006; PlayStation 2: JP: June 29, 2006; NA: July 18, 2006; PAL: July 28, 2006
- Genre: Fighting
- Modes: Single-player, multiplayer
- Arcade system: Namco System 256

Super Dragon Ball Z (Japanese: 超(スーパー)ドラゴンボールZ, Hepburn: Sūpā Doragon Bōru Zetto) is a cel-shaded 3D fighting video game, based on the Japanese manga series Dragon Ball created by Akira Toriyama. It was released in Japanese arcades on December 22, 2005, with a European release following in 2006. A port for the PlayStation 2 would release in Japan on June 29, 2006, in North America on July 18 the same year, and in PAL regions July 28. The game was developed by Arika and Crafts & Meister, headed by Noritaka Funamizu (a former Capcom fighting game producer who worked on the Street Fighter series and Darkstalkers). The gameplay harkens back to more traditional fighting games in contrast to other DBZ fighting games of the time, while also featuring destructible environments.

The game sold 95,082 units in the first week of its release in Japan, ranking at #2 in software sales in Japan for that week, second to Nintendo's New Super Mario Bros. The game sold 370,000 global copies.

== Gameplay ==
Shifting away from the gameplay of recent series such as the Dragon Ball Z: Budokai and the Budokai Tenkaichi games, Super Dragon Ball Z brings its style back to a more traditional formula made famous with the Capcom, SNK, etc., games of the 1990s.

"Fireball motions" and the like provide the majority of special move inputs, along with "dial-a-combos" (as seen in Mortal Kombat 3 and the Tekken series) for closer, hand-to-hand combat. Some characters (Goku, Gohan, Vegeta, Trunks, etc.) have brief power-ups into their Super Saiyan forms. Characters have "super moves", throws, juggles, dashes, etc. that can trace their roots back to these earlier 1990s games.

=== Game modes (home version) ===
Original

This is a basic arcade mode, in which the player can use either a normal, or custom character to fight their way through seven opponents (receiving a Dragon Ball for each victory) and gain experience on the way. The sixth opponent will always be Frieza and the seventh opponent will always be Cell.

Z Survivor

A "survival" mode in which the player fights various opponents for as long as their health remains above zero. Battles all take place in the world tournament ring (with the same background music each time), and last a single round. If the player wins the round, they play a "roulette"-style game in which their selection endows them with items such as additional experience, extra health, Dragon Balls, etc. If using a custom character, the player will gain experience.

Training

A mode where the player can perfect their skills against a computer opponent (stationary, responsive, etc.). Battles take place within Vegeta's training room.

Versus

A standard two-player versus mode. Players may use either the default characters or their own custom versions from either memory card slot.

Shenron Summon

Upon collecting seven Dragon Balls with a custom character, the player may enter this mode to summon Shenron. The player may then wish for various items, such as additional attacks, unlockable characters, etc. After making a wish, the Dragon Balls disappear and must be recollected in another game mode.

Customize

The player may set up "custom" characters to battle with. These characters gain experience from fighting, allowing them to learn new special attacks and raise their statistics. There are 30 available slots for custom characters, and they may be used in Original, Z Survivor, Training, Summon Shenron, and Versus modes. Characters can be equipped with badges and items that make them unique from other customizations.

== Development ==
The game's theme throughout its presentation is that of the manga. Color schemes, art styles, and even loading screens are all nods to the original Japanese Weekly Jump serialization and collected tankobōn run of the series. For example, the orange on Goku's gi is not in the saturated shade of vermilion depicted in the TV series; images on the main menu are significant colored images from the manga; loading screens mirror the original Japanese tankobōn cover art; sound effects are written out during battle when an excessively-hard hit connects; etc.

=== International versions ===
Atari have made a few alterations to their North American version of this release. The opening song, "Cha-La Head-Cha-La (2005 ver.)" has been replaced with an unknown techno instrumental similar to Bruce Faulconer's work. Also, the Japanese manga-style sound effects have been altered to an English translation, apparently to help with the translation of the game. Finally, there is no option for the Japanese voice actors, which completely contrasts the previous North American releases of Sparking!, Budokai 3 (GH), and even the PlayStation Portable's Dragon Ball Z: Shin Budokai. The PAL version has the same opening song and manga-style sound effect translations as the US version, but alternatively retains the Japanese voice actors with no option to change to the English cast (similar to the release of the PAL version of Budokai).

However, there would seem to be one optional Japanese voice actor from Atari left in. Jouji Yanami is evidently one of the unlockable "Narration" voices for the game, even credited in the "Original Mode" ending sequence. Despite this, there is no slot for his voice in the unlockable Narrator wishes, so this may have just been left in by accident.

The game was released at a retail price of $40 and is the 6th Dragon Ball Z game to be released in North America on the PlayStation 2 (7th counting the Greatest Hits release of the Budokai 3). But overall, other than the alterations mentioned above, nothing is removed/cut from the game. The Dr. Slump character, Suppa Man, is even retained in the "Eastern Capital" level.

Super Dragon Ball Z is one of three games packaged together and released as Dragon Ball Z Trilogy. The other two games in the bundle are Dragon Ball Z: Budokai Tenkaichi and Dragon Ball Z: Budokai Tenkaichi 2.

=== Music ===
The opening theme for the Japanese version is "Cha-La Head-Cha-La (2005 ver.)" as performed by Hironobu Kageyama. This is a remix of the first Dragon Ball Z TV opening theme, released as a CD single in 2005 with variations of it and the second opening theme, "We Gotta Power", also included on the seven-track CD (Sony Music / Team Entertainment, KDSD-74). The score of the game features at least two remixes of background music composed for the Dragon Ball Z TV series by Shunsuke Kikuchi. Other pieces are newly composed for this game. All pieces are upbeat, blippy-techno style. And for the North America version, the theme song was changed/replaced with Rock the Dragon by Ron Wasserman, which served as the official theme song of Dragon Ball Z TV broadcasts at the time of the game's release.

== Reception ==
Reception

Aggregate scores
Aggregator	Score
GameRankings	74.38%
Metacritic	72/100

Review scores
Publication	Score
Eurogamer	5/10
Game Informer	6/10
GamePro	4.5/5
GameSpot	7.3/10
GameSpy	3.5/5
GameTrailers	7.5/10
GameZone	7.7/10
IGN	7.4/10
Official U.S. PlayStation Magazine	4/5
PALGN	6.5/10

Super Dragon Ball Z was met with average reception upon release, as GameRankings gave it a score of 74.38%, while Metacritic gave it 72 out of 100.

== See also ==
- List of Dragon Ball video games
