= Cyberbots: Fullmetal Madness =

1995 video game

- Arcade flyer
- Developer: Capcom
- Publisher: Capcom
- Composers: Takayuki Iwai; Akari Kaida; Masato Kouda; Naoaki Iwami
- Platforms: Arcade, Sega Saturn, PlayStation
- Release: Arcade: JP: April 1995; NA: October 1995; EU: 1995; Saturn: JP: March 28, 1997; PlayStation: JP: December 25, 1997
- Genre: Fighting
- Modes: Single-player, multiplayer
- Arcade system: CP System II

Cyberbots: Fullmetal Madness (Note: Japanese: サイバーボッツ フルメタルマッドネス, Hepburn: Saibābottsu: Furu Metaru Maddonesu) is a 1995 fighting game developed and published by Capcom for arcades. It is a spin-off of the beat 'em up game Armored Warriors and consists of versus battles between mechas, each with their own human pilots. Built on the CP System II arcade board, it saw limited distribution in arcades outside Japan; the game was ported to the Sega Saturn and PlayStation home consoles domestically featuring additional content. With the exception of an untranslated PlayStation Network release in 2011, none of the console ports were released overseas. The arcade version of Cyberbots: Fullmetal Madness was released as part of Capcom Arcade Stadium and Capcom Fighting Collection. The game was succeeded by Tech Romancer (1998).

== Gameplay ==
Gameplay screenshot (Sega Saturn version)

The premise in Cyberbots is similar to Armored Warriors, albeit it features a maximum of two playable characters on screen as opposed to three. Similar to the Armored Core series, different legs (which affect movement abilities), arms (which affect reach and melee capabilities) and weapons can be mixed and matched between the selectable robots available to the player. Gameplay in Cyberbots is similar to other Capcom-created fighting games, with a medium-sized command list of executing various attacks available to each individual robot. Battles are a duel-formatted affair with players and the computer fighting against one another to proceed to the next battle.

Each robot also has a gauge which is charged with energy every time it hits an opponent or the attack buttons are pressed simultaneously. Once the gauge is fully charged, the player can execute a "super special".

== Plot ==
In the game the player first chooses the pilot and then the mecha (Valiant/Variant Armor or VA for short) they'll use to fight. The mechas determine the gameplay of the game, but the pilot is what determines the storyline the player will see. Near the end of the 21st century Earth begins to become over populated leading to many people living in man made space colonies. The primary army of Earth, "Earth Force", has been conducting experiments and their work, along with the actions of the playable characters will determine the future of Earth.

== Characters ==
=== Playable characters ===
- Jin Saotome voiced by: Tōru Furuya (game proper), Yuji Ueda (Marvel vs Capcom series) - Jin's father (Ken Saotome) was killed in an accident one year before. To honor his memory he seeks to become the best VA pilot alive and wants to prove his worth through the VA battle circuit. He begins to question his father's death after meeting SHADE for the first time. Jin's mood goes from calm to rage within seconds, but he remains a good person. He is also friends with Gawaine Murdock. Jin appears in the Marvel vs. Capcom series and Tech Romancer as a playable character. He also makes a cameo in Hawkeye's ending in Ultimate Marvel vs. Capcom 3 as a member of his West Coast Avengers. His main mech is BX-02 Blodia. Blodia appears in PTX-40A's ending in Tatsunoko vs. Capcom.
- Santana Laurence Voiced by: Kiyoyuki Yanada - Santana is a self-centered loner who makes a living scrounging up parts for VA's and sometimes working as a mercenary. In the past he was the leader of the proud Mars Revolution. Santana knows SHADE and Gawaine. He's likely just an old friend of Gawaine, but he fought SHADE on Mars during the revolution. He's also a bit of a narcissist and a womanizer. Santana also has a cameo appearance in PTX-40A's ending in Tatsunoko vs. Capcom.
- Mary Miyabi Voiced by: Hisako Takayama - She is the only female Captain of Earth Force. When a prisoner escapes she is sent to retrieve him/her and bring them back immediately. While pursuing the prisoner she finds out more about the dealings of Earth Force and turns against them after meeting Arieta, Bao and Mao. She was trained by retired soldier, Gawaine Murdock. Aside for a soft side for children she is the typical soldier. She pilots the RF-004 Reptos.
- Gawaine Murdock Voiced by: Tesshō Genda - Gawaine was a captain of Earth Force who retired at age 63 after the deaths of his men in a training accident. He lives in seclusion from everyone while trying to live out his final days in peace and quiet. He returns after Earth Force begins making trouble. Gawaine was Mary's captain when she was still lieutenant, a close friend of the Saotome family and good friend to SHADE in the past before SHADE was turned into a cyborg. He pilots the GP-N1 Guldin.
- Arieta Voiced by: Mika Kanai - Earth Force kidnapped children and used them for experiments. Arieta escaped after seeing her friends die in their labs. She doesn't know exactly what Earth Force is trying to do, her only concern is escaping the torture that she had to endure. Without any friends to turn to for help so she runs without knowing where to go. A naturally kind hearted person, she seems to win over anyone she meets, except for SHADE and Devilotte.
- Bao and Mao Voiced by: Kappei Yamaguchi (Bao); Kae Araki (Mao) - They are siblings that have been caught by Earth Force. They escape and find a VA that's programmed for self-defense. Even though they have no piloting experience, the VA still operates fine due to the programming and sheer luck. Bao is very protective of his little sister. He doesn't know about the Earth Force's dealings and he doesn't care. He just wants to get away from everything safely with his sister.

=== Console-exclusive playable characters ===
- Chiyomaru Kagura and Tessan Hagure Voiced by: Ryō Horikawa (Chiyomaru Kagura); Banjō Ginga (Tessan Hagure) - Chiyomaru Kagura is the head of the resistance fleet while Tessan Hagure is his guardian. The resistance forces' mission is to find and destroy the doomsday weapon created by the Weapon's Brain: G.O.D. The two were once part of the Earth Forces until they left to form a resistance forces to oppose the Earth Force's experiments. Chiyomaru pilots the P-10033 Gaits.
- Princess Devilotte de Deathsatan IX Voiced by: Etsuko Kozakura - Devilotte is the daughter of a dangerous and reputed pirate king. She and her two lackeys (Dave the scientist and Xavier the wizard) fly around space looking for people with VAs to steal them and add to her collection. She is not involved with either side of the dispute in the Earth Force events. She pilots the S-008 Super-8, a mecha in the shape of an octopus that was designed for underwater use. Devilotte has a crush on Gawaine. Devilotte appears in Super Puzzle Fighter II Turbo as a hidden character, an assist character in Marvel vs. Capcom: Clash of Super Heroes, a cameo in Doronjo's ending in Tatsunoko vs. Capcom, and a Solo Unit in Project X Zone. She was also released as a playable character for the Puzzle Fighter mobile game in 2018.
- SHADE Voiced by: Shōzō Iizuka - Earth Force began something similar to a 'super soldier' experiment. They needed someone who was strong and young. SHADE ended up being their candidate. They promised that he would be the perfect soldier but they needed to see if they had complete control over him, so they made him kill everyone in his unit. Earth Force writes the incident off as an accident. Shade is now a cyborg and an attack dog for Earth Force. His memories are a little scrambled and he is trying to remember who he was. Jin's last name is the first thing that starts to refresh his memory. In the end he dies saving Earth, doing one last favor for his old friend. He pilots the UVA-02 Helion.

=== Non-playable characters ===
- Ken Saotome Voiced by: Tesshō Genda - Ken, Shade and Gawaine belonged to the same unit in Earth Force and the three were close. Ken was killed by Shade one year before the start of Cyberbots. Gawaine wasn't there when it happened and it was believed to be an accident. He looked like a taller, bulkier version of Jin, except he wore green instead of white.
- Final Weapon's Brain - G.O.D. (Ganglions of Omniscient Disrupter) - G.O.D. is a massive brain that plans to destroy humanity. It mainly controls the mech X-0 WARLOCK, like Azrael before it, but in other storyline paths controls the RF-027 JACKAL and the FZ-900J KILLER BEE as well. The brain seems able to dominate Arieta temporarily. Ultimately, it is destroyed.
- Emperor Death Satan - Emperor Death Satan is the king of Heldorado and the Milky Way Express, and Devilotte's father. More importantly, apart from owning a WARLOCK VA, he is also the owner of Z-AKUMA (Z-GOUKI in Japan), an extremely powerful mech based on the Street Fighter villain. His face is hidden behind a huge suit of armor, and his voice booms audibly, implying that he may not be human.

== Ports ==
The Sega Saturn version of the game uses the 1 MB RAM expansion cartridge and includes a code which makes the Akuma mech playable.

The game was released for the PlayStation in Japan on December 25, 1997. Both PlayStation and Sega Saturn versions had voices for characters in the story mode.

== Reception ==
Reception

Review score
Publication	Score
Famitsu	8/10, 7/10, 7/10, 6/10 (PS)

In Japan, Game Machine listed Cyberbots: Fullmetal Madness on their June 1, 1995 issue as being the thirteenth most-popular arcade game the previous two weeks, outperforming titles such as Virtua Fighter. Reviewing the arcade version, a Next Generation critic summarized that the game "lacks the charm, craze - and gameplay - for which [Capcom] is known." He particularly criticized the game concept and limited number of combo moves, and added that "when the bots do attack, it looks like a bad disco contest."

== See also ==
- Shin Kidō Senki Gundam Wing: Endless Duel
- Gundam: Battle Assault
- Virtual On: Cyber Troopers
