= Crafts & Meister =

Japanese video game developer

Crafts & Meister Co., Ltd.
- Native name: 株式会社クラフト＆マイスター
- Romanized name: Kabushiki gaisha Kurafuto & Meisutā
- Company type: Kabushiki gaisha
- Industry: Video games
- Founded: June 1, 2004; 22 years ago
- Headquarters: Osaka, Japan
- Key people: Katsuhiro Sudo (CEO); Noritaka Funamizu
- Number of employees: 30 (as of September 2018)
- Website: www.crafts-meister.co.jp/pc/home.html

Crafts & Meister (株式会社クラフト＆マイスター, Kabushiki gaisha Kurafuto & Meisutā) is a Japanese video game developer formed in 2004 when former Capcom employees Noritaka Funamizu (ex-general manager of Capcom's Production Studio 1) and Katsuhiro Sudo (producer) left the company. At its start, it had eight employees.

== List of Crafts & Meister's games ==
Year	Title	Platform(s)	Publisher
2005	Super Dragon Ball Z	Arcade, PlayStation 2	Bandai
2006	Mobile Suit Gundam - Quiz Monsenshi DX	PlayStation Portable	Banpresto
2007	Mizuiro Blood	Nintendo DS	Namco Bandai Games
2008	Code Geass: Lost Colors	PlayStation Portable	Namco Bandai Games
2010	Hagane no Renkinjutsushi: Fullmetal Alchemist - Yakusoku no Hi e	PlayStation Portable	Namco Bandai Games
2011	Star Driver: Kagayaki no Takuto - Ginga Bishōnen Densetsu	PlayStation Portable	Namco Bandai Games
2011	Earth Seeker	Wii	Kadokawa Games
2013	Gundam Breaker	PlayStation 3, PlayStation Vita	Bandai Namco Games
2013	Mushibugyo	Nintendo 3DS	Bandai Namco Games
2014	CV: Casting Voice	PlayStation 3	Bandai Namco Games
2014	Freshness Zombies	iOS	DeNA
2014	Gundam Breaker 2	PlayStation 3, PlayStation Vita	Bandai Namco Games
2014	Simple DL Vol. 37: The Kyojin Hashi	Nintendo 3DS	D3 Publisher
2015	Motto Oshioki: Punching Girl!!!	Android	Crafts & Meister
2016	Gundam Breaker 3	PlayStation 4, PlayStation Vita	Bandai Namco Entertainment
2018	New Gundam Breaker	PlayStation 4	Bandai Namco Entertainment
2024	Gundam Breaker 4	Windows, Nintendo Switch, PlayStation 5	Bandai Namco Entertainment
2026	BLOKES on BLOCKS!	Windows, Nintendo Switch	Crafts & Meister
