= Cannon Spike =

2000 video game

- European Dreamcast cover art
- Developer: Psikyo
- Publisher: Capcom
- Director: Shinsuke Nakamura
- Producer: Tatsuya Minami
- Programmers: Kenichi Fujita; Kunihiko Nogomi; Michiaki Negoro; Katsuya Shikanouchi; Kokichi Ogi
- Composers: Masaki Izutani; Toshiya Kobayashi; Kaori Kumakura; Kensuke Sato
- Platforms: Arcade, Dreamcast
- Release: Arcade; 2000; Dreamcast: NA: 15 November 2000; JP: 21 December 2000; EU: 26 April 2002
- Genre: Multi-directional shooter
- Mode: Up to 2 players simultaneously
- Arcade system: Sega NAOMI

Cannon Spike, originally released in Japan as Gunspike (ガンスパイク, Gansupaiku), is a multi-directional shooter arcade game released in 2000 by Psikyo and later in the same year for the Dreamcast by Capcom. It uses Capcom-designed characters and runs on Sega's Naomi Hardware. Cannon Spike is similar to games like Smash TV and Capcom's Commando, although with primary focus on boss fighting. Cannon Spike is noted as the last game released for Dreamcast in Europe, published by Bigben Interactive and exclusively sold at retail in Game outlets.

The international title, Cannon Spike, is the name of a trademark attack performed by Cammy, a character from the Street Fighter series of video games and one of the protagonists of this title.

== Gameplay ==
Cannon Spike is played using a joystick and three buttons; Mark (used to lock onto a targeted enemy), Shoot, and Attack (a close-range strike, usually more powerful or with greater knock-back compared to ordinary shooting). In addition to these basic commands, each character also has a ranged special attack (unleashed by pressing Shoot and Attack simultaneously), a close-range special (Mark and Attack simultaneously), and a super special (all three buttons simultaneously). The use of the super special requires a Special Token, occasionally dropped by a defeated enemy and always dropped by a defeated ally in 2-player mode.

The game features seven playable characters, each of which originates from or is inspired by other Capcom games. These include Cammy and Charlie from the Street Fighter series; Arthur from Ghosts 'n Goblins; the original characters Shiba Shintaro and Simone, based on Siva from Midnight Wanderers and Linn Kurosawa from Alien vs. Predator respectively; and the secret characters Baby Bonnie Hood from Darkstalkers and Mega Man. In addition, Vega from the Street Fighter series appears as an enemy character, named "Fallen Balrog" or "Revenger Balrog" in all regions.

== Reception ==
Reception

Aggregate score
| Aggregator | Score |
|---|---|
| Metacritic | 73/100 |

Review scores
| Publication | Score |
|---|---|
| AllGame | 3/5 |
| Edge | 7/10 |
| Electronic Gaming Monthly | 6.17/10 (Note: In an early review, two critics of Electronic Gaming Monthly gave the Dreamcast version each a score of 6/10, and the other gave it 6.5/10.) |
| Famitsu | 30/40 |
| Game Informer | 7/10 |
| GameFan | 88% |
| GamePro | 4/5 |
| GameRevolution | C+ |
| GameSpot | 7.8/10 |
| IGN | 8.8/10 |
| Next Generation | 3/5 |

The Dreamcast version received "average" reviews according to the review aggregation website Metacritic. Electronic Gaming Monthly and Game Informer gave it average reviews, months before its U.S. release. Greg Orlando of NextGen said that the game was "not quite artillerific, but it is a mindlessly fun way to murder some time." In Japan, Famitsu gave it a score of 30 out of 40.

Also in Japan, Game Machine listed the arcade version in their 15 November 2000 issue as the second most-successful arcade game of the month.
