= Q-Bee =

Character from Darkstalkers

- Darkstalkers character
- Q-Bee in Vampire Savior (1997)
- First game: Vampire Savior (1997)
- Created by: Akira "Akiman" Yasuda
- Voiced by: Miyuki Matsushita; Arisa Nishiguchi (Project X Zone)

In-universe information
- Species: Soul Bee

Q-Bee (Japanese: キュービィ, Hepburn: Kyūbi) is a video game character from the Darkstalkers fighting game series. Q-Bee appears as an enemy in Namco x Capcom, as well as a card in the SNK vs. Capcom: Card Fighters Clash series. She is voiced by Miyuki Matsushita and Arisa Nishiguchi.

== Conception and design ==
Capcom began development of the fighting game Vampire Savior in 1996, with General Producer Noritaka Funamizu wanting the game to surpass the reactions that another recent Capcom fighting game, Street Fighter III, had seen during its location tests. When working on the game's cast, they had received negative feedback that the company's fighting games felt too reliant on character popularity, so they focused on solid gameplay mechanics instead. In an interview, character designer Takenori "Kimokimo" Kimoto stated the team wanted to include a character that embodied an insect. A man-spider or a man that transformed into a large fly were considered early in development, as well as the idea of a mutated insect that would summon other insects. Artist Akira "Akiman" Yasuda offered up the design of a bee-woman with a well-developed background, and the design team immediately took a liking to it.

Funamizu wanted characters like Q-Bee to appeal to general audiences who liked character art and visual flair, intending them to stop and look at the arcade cabinet in awe at how they were animated. He added that the character design was influenced by Yasuda's tastes at the time, which gravitated around short haired girls and an emphasis on buttocks. Yasuda added his belief that in order for the character design to work, one had to engage less on corporate calculation, and instead indulge on their personal biases, fetishes, and interests.

Her eyes are actually two large compound eyes atop her head, with those on her face meant strictly to give her a more human appearance.

== Appearances ==
Q-Bee is a bee-based monster called a "Soul Bee," born in Makai in an unknown year. Q-Bee and her race lived in the lands of the Dohma family. But during the time when Jedah was dead, her home began to crumble and her race was about to die. She headed toward the Majigen, which Jedah created after his resurrection, to gather souls to satisfy the hunger of the Soul Bees, as well as her own.

== Critical reception ==
Ian Walker in an article for A.V. Club considered Q-Bee one of the creepiest characters in fighting games, citing the fact that the low intellect of Soul Bees, compared it to that of a toddler, made it questionable how aware they were of the actions Jedah was having them do. While he felt Q-Bee was more aware, he found the use of its face as a disguise to be particularly sinister. Tom Goulter of GamesRadar+ meanwhile stated that while "sexy lady in form-fitting clothing", a common sight in fighting games, he found her stinger to be her most disturbing aspect. Going further, he described Soul Bees as "carnivorous, sexxxy, human-sized and able to sting endlessly without dying", a combination he considered the scariest aspect of the franchise.

The staff of Gamest magazine in their Gals Island series of publications cited her as an example of how despite the subject matter the Darkstalkers games had attractive aspects, though at the same time found she made them feel gross due to her insect aspect. Despite their criticism, they also felt she represented some of the unconventional character designs that went into the franchise that they found awe inspiring. The staff also observed that out that while all three female characters introduced in Vampire Savior rated highly on their reader poll, Q-Bee was the least popular, with many readers expressing a dislike for bugs. Gamest's staff expressed some confusion at this, stating that Q-Bee's movements, speech, and behavior were all very different from what one would expect from an insect. When asked about it, Yasuda responded that "If there is a character who gains the highest peak popularity, it's only natural that a character sitting at the absolute bottom exists too."

Diamond Feit in Retronauts' podcast argued that Q-Bee was not really designed to be sexy, with co-host Ant Cooke agreeing, stating that he felt her being "a little off-putting" was the purpose of her design. Feit pointed out that while she had a feminine body, she also featured exaggerated proportions particularly the large bug eyes on her head. They further drew attention to her Catch and Release move, joking that it had to be the sexual fetish of someone on the development team, with Cooke stating "It does more damage to the opponent in real life. It's morale-sapping, is what it is." He further added that as a character, "Q-Bee scares me, and I'm not sure if I like it." Russian gaming magazine Strana Igr saw Q-Bee as a continuation of a trend at Capcom of utilizing insects in games as a basis for enemy designs, starting with their arcade game Exed Exes, and questioned why nobody had previously asked the company the reasons behind it. He further added that while he found the character attractive and a more cute direction of the concept, he considered the species' voracious hunger a deterrent.
