= Darkstalkers =

Fighting video game series

- Genre: Fighting
- Developers: Capcom; Iron Galaxy Studios (Resurrection)
- Publisher: Capcom
- Creators: Junichi Ohno (planner); Alex Jimenez (concept)
- Platforms: Arcade, Dreamcast, Nintendo Switch, Microsoft Windows, PlayStation, PlayStation 2, PlayStation 3, PlayStation 4, PlayStation Portable, Sega Saturn, Xbox 360, Xbox One
- First release: Darkstalkers: The Night Warriors; July 12, 1994
- Latest release: Capcom Fighting Collection; June 24, 2022

Darkstalkers, known in Japan as Vampire (ヴァンパイア), is a Japanese fighting game series and media franchise created by Capcom. The series is set in a pastiche gothic fiction universe with characters based on monsters from international folklore, and features a stylized 2D graphic style. Its first game, Darkstalkers: The Night Warriors, was released in arcades in 1994 and its third and final main game is Vampire Savior, released in 1997. Darkstalkers introduced gameplay concepts used in later Capcom fighting games, including the Street Fighter Alpha and Marvel vs. Capcom series.

Besides video games, the Darkstalkers media franchise also includes an anime miniseries, an American animated series, a Canadian comic book series, and many books of various kinds and other media released only in Japan. Some individual characters, such as Morrigan Aensland and Felicia, appeared in later Capcom games, as well as in a few crossover games released by other companies.

== Video games ==
=== Original arcade games ===
The Darkstalkers series is composed of five arcade games and the home ports and compilations of those games.

Release	Title	Platform	Notes
1994	Darkstalkers: The Night Warriors • Vampire: The Night Warriors^{JP}	Arcade, PlayStation	
1995	Night Warriors: Darkstalkers' Revenge • Vampire Hunter: Darkstalkers' Revenge^{JP}	Arcade, Saturn	
1997	Vampire Savior: The Lord of Vampire • Vampire Savior: World of Darkness • Darkstalkers 3 (PS) • Vampire Savior: EX Edition (PS)^{JP}	Arcade, Saturn^{JP}, PlayStation	Subtitled World of Darkness for initial USA arcade release, and The Lord of Vampire for subsequent releases. Sega Saturn port includes additional characters from Vampire Savior 2. PlayStation port includes all characters from Vampire Savior, Vampire Savior 2, and Vampire Hunter 2 (all characters in the franchise).
1997	Vampire Hunter 2: Darkstalkers' Revenge^{JP}	Arcade^{JP}	Modified version of Vampire Savior which uses the character roster from Vampire Hunter
1997	Vampire Savior 2: The Lord of Vampire^{JP}	Arcade^{JP}	Modified version of Vampire Savior that removes J. Talbain, Sasquatch, and Rikuo and replaces them with Donovan, Huitzil, and Pyron.

=== Ports, remasters, and compilations ===
Release	Title	Platform	Notes
2000	Vampire Chronicle for Matching Service^{JP} • Darkstalkers Chronicle: The Chaos Tower (PSP) • Vampire Chronicle: The Chaos Tower (PSP)^{JP}	Dreamcast^{JP}, PSP	Modified version of Vampire Savior that includes all franchise characters and allows the player to select game-specific variants of each character like the character version selection in Hyper Street Fighter II. Dreamcast version included online play. PSP port includes additional game modes.
2005	Vampire: Darkstalkers Collection^{JP}	PlayStation 2^{JP}	A Japan-only compilation of all five arcade releases. Compared to other compilations, Vampire has been viewed as the most beloved and definitive by critics and fans of the series alike.
2013	Darkstalkers Resurrection • Vampire Resurrection^{JP}	PlayStation 3, Xbox 360	High-definition update of Night Warriors: Darkstalkers' Revenge and Vampire Savior with online play.
2022	Capcom Fighting Collection	PlayStation 4, Xbox One, Switch, Windows	Includes nine Capcom fighting games and one puzzle game, including all five Darkstalkers arcade games. Includes online play, and is the first time that Vampire Hunter 2 and Vampire Savior 2 are released outside Japan. Secret endings were not included.
2022	Capcom Arcade 2nd Stadium	PlayStation 4, Xbox One, Switch, Windows	Includes 32 Capcom arcade games, including the first three Darkstalkers games.

=== Future ===
Capcom producer Yoshinori Ono said in 2007: "Personally, I'd love to make a new Marvel vs. Capcom, and I'd also like to see the triumphant return of Darkstalkers to a new generation of technology. It would be an interesting challenge with Darkstalkers, because in the old games you'd see a lot of really interesting animations as characters would morph into different forms. That would be tricky to do with this 3D engine, but not impossible. In two or three years, if I got the chance to resurrect that series, I'd like to shock Hollywood with how good the graphics would look". In August 2010, Ono stated during an interview about Street Fighter X Tekken that a new installment to the series would be his "ultimate dream", but only fan demand would cause it to happen. He went on to say that it would take one million requests before Keiji Inafune, then head of research and development at Capcom, would comply. At that point, Capcom had received 5,000 requests. By March 2011, Ono reported that Capcom had received over 100,000 requests. He later expressed during an interview at a Nintendo 3DS launch in London that "one day, if it goes half a million, Capcom may raise its eyebrow a little bit and I could do what I did in London in 2007 when I announced the comeback of Street Fighter. In the near future, with your help, it may become true. It's on its way, because we're pretty much where we were with Street Fighter a few years back. So keep it up".

At the 2011 San Diego Comic-Con, Ono revealed during the Street Fighter X Tekken panel that while a new Darkstalkers title had not been approved, he reassured the series' fans that "Darkstalkers is not dead". He then proceeded to take a photo of the attendees at the panel holding up their money to send to decision makers at Capcom to show support for the game. Later the following year in June, a message "Darkstalkers are not dead" appeared in a trailer for the PlayStation Vita version of Street Fighter X Tekken; when asked about it, Ono wrote on his Twitter: "I can't announce about Darkstalkers yet". Ono later teased the presence of Darkstalkers at a panel for Street Fighter's 25th Anniversary Celebration at San Diego Comic-Con in July. Instead of taking a photo to send proof of demand to Capcom's upper management like he had done in the past, he stated: "This year, you don't have to do that, and it's not necessarily bad news!", but refrained himself from saying anything else.

Following the announcement of Darkstalkers Resurrection at 2012 New York Comic Con in October, a concept trailer was shown during Capcom's Street Fighter 25th Anniversary panel. Darkstalkers Resurrection producer Derek Neal and Yoshinori Ono told interviewers that the re-release bundle was the first step towards revitalizing the franchise. Neal also claimed that Capcom is using Darkstalkers Resurrection as a test to gauge audience interest in a new Darkstalkers installment. In April 2013, Capcom senior vice president Christian Svensson wrote: "We've not given up. But I'm disappointed in the opening sales response relative to any other fighting title we've put out on the same platforms given the frequency and urgency of requests we've had here over the last several years and the quality of the execution. It is the most fully featured and probably best project of this type we've done. And before people jump to the wrong conclusions, I'm not blaming fans who did buy it and supported the brand. I'm very thankful for those guys (thank you, to all of you). I'm more disappointed by my misread of the information in this particular case". There was no "Darkstalkers are not dead" line at San Diego Comic-Con in 2013. Matt Dahlgren, Capcom's new fighting game manager, said that because "Darkstalkers Resurrection did not perform as well as we would have liked. You never know what the future may hold, but Street Fighter is definitely not dead. There is nothing Darkstalkers on the immediate horizon for sure".

== Plot ==
The characters of the Darkstalkers series

The Darkstalkers games take place on the planet Earth that is in the process of merging with a realm known as Makai. The reason for this merger varies depending on the continuity, but a continuing theme is that the union of realms brings the arrival of the Darkstalkers to the human world, the term being a catch-all for the various creatures of legend. The greatest of these supernatural creatures, and the greatest among those who hunt them, meet in battle to determine who will rule the night.

In the original game and the sequel, Night Warriors: Darkstalkers' Revenge, an alien overlord named Pyron returns to Earth after being away for many years. His quest to conquer the world using an army of robots brings the Darkstalkers out of hiding to oppose his rule over humanity and the supernatural. A second sequel, Vampire Savior, saw the debut of Jedah, previously one of the nobles of Makai, who decides that the only way to save the realm is to take control of it by force. Accordingly, he lures the Darkstalkers into a trap to use their collective souls to remake the realm and control both humanity and the supernatural.

Darkstalkers characters are either based on various iconic literary and cinematic monsters, or inspired by international mythology and fairy tales. The 1997 anime miniseries Night Warriors: Darkstalkers' Revenge, which was based on the first two titles, was faithful to the characters' in-game personalities. The 1995 American-produced cartoon series, simply titled Darkstalkers, dropped the backstory of the games altogether in favor of a standard good-versus-evil plot, altering certain characters' storylines in the process.

=== Introduced in Darkstalkers: The Night Warriors ===
These characters were introduced in Darkstalkers: The Night Warriors

Name	Voiced by	Description	Other major appearances
Anakaris	Kan Tokumaru	Anakaris (アナカリス, Anakarisu) was once the pharaoh of a powerful empire. After being revived by Pyron as a mummy, he seeks to regain his rule. At the end of Darkstalkers, he travels back in time to restore his empire, and later after he learns its destruction is unavoidable, he transports his kingdom to a new dimension to keep it safe. Anakaris' name is a reference to Kharis, the chief antagonist of the 1940s Universal Pictures Mummy films.	Marvel vs Capcom 2 Capcom Fighting Evolution
Bishamon	Kan Tokumaru	Bishamon (ビシャモン, Bishamon) is a ghostly samurai inhabiting a cursed suit of armor called "Hannya", which drives him into a blood frenzy. After Pyron's defeat, the curse is broken, and the freed Bishamon and his wife become priests. In Vampire Savior, the armor revives itself by gathering souls, but is sealed again by Bishamon. An alternate version of Bishamon, "Oboro Bishamon", is a playable secret character in certain iterations of Vampire Savior, depicted as Bishamon dominating the cursed armor and sword tandem Hannya and Kien, instead of being enslaved by it.	
Demitri	Nobuyuki Hiyama	Demitri Maximoff (デミトリ・マキシモフ, Demitori Makishimofu) is often considered the series' protagonist, and organized the first fighting tournament between the characters. A vampire lord formerly living in the demon world Makai, he was banished after attempting a coup. After defeating and consuming Pyron, he seeks to subjugate his rival Morrigan. He was planned to appear in the cancelled fighting game Capcom Fighting All-Stars	Expand: SNK vs. Capcom: SVC Chaos; Capcom Fighting Evolution; Namco × Capcom; Cross Edge; Project X Zone; Project X Zone 2
Felicia	Kae Araki (1994–2008); Kana Asumi (2009–present)	The catgirl Felicia (フェリシア, Ferishia) dreams of being a famous singer and dancer in Las Vegas. She eventually runs an orphanage, as a nun. She has since appeared in a multitude of games developed by Capcom. Felicia was originally envisioned by Alex Jimenez to be a woman from Africa with short hair that could transform into a panther.	Expand: Capcom Fighting Evolution; Cross Edge; Marvel vs. Capcom 2; Marvel vs. Capcom 3; Ultimate Marvel vs. Capcom 3; Namco × Capcom; Project X Zone 2; Pocket Fighter; Puzzle Fighter; SNK vs. Capcom: The Match of the Millennium; Puzzle Spirits
Huitzil	Juurouta Kosugi	Huitzil, called Phobos (フォボス, Fobosu) in Japan, are a series of robots meant to serve Pyron. After causing the extinction of the dinosaurs, they remained dormant until unearthed by Mayans who utilized them as guardians. When Pyron returns to conquer earth centuries later, he revives them to serve him again, where they act as an unplayable boss in the first Darkstalkers game. In Darkstalkers 3, a Huitzil becomes the guardian of a young boy, Cecil, after he falls into the ruins where they lie dormant.	Namco × Capcom
Jon Talbain	Yūji Ueda	Jon Talbain, called Gallon (ガロン, Garon) in Japan, is a British werewolf and karate master seeking to escape his curse. He utilizes nunchuk-based martial arts. An alternate version of Talbain, "Dark Talbain", is a playable secret character in certain iterations of Vampire Savior, depicted as his malevolent doppelganger. Talbain proved significantly more popular in the West than in Japan.	
Lord Raptor	Yūji Ueda	Lord Raptor, called Zabel Zarock (ザベル・ザロック, Zaberu Zarokku) in Japan, is an Australian rock and roll musician revived as a zombie by his lord Ozumu after sacrificing himself and his audience. He travels with La Malta, a creature assigned by Ozumu to spy on the overly-ambitious Raptor.	Namco × Capcom; Project X Zone; Project X Zone 2
Morrigan	Yayoi Jinguji (1994–2010); Rie Tanaka (2011–present)	Morrigan Aensland (モリガン・アーンスランド, Morigan Ānsurando), considered the most popular Darkstalkers character amongst fans of the series, is Demitri Maximoff's rival. A powerful succubus, she is the adopted daughter of Belial Aensland, ruler of the demon world Makai. She has little interest in assuming responsibility however, and is instead a carefree layabout. She merges with her sister self, Lilith, at the end of Vampire Savior and gains more power. Morrigan has since gone on to appear in many Capcom titles.	Expand: Capcom vs. SNK: Millennium Fight 2000; Capcom vs. SNK 2; Cross Edge; Gunbird 2; Marvel vs. Capcom; Marvel vs. Capcom 2; Marvel vs. Capcom 3; Ultimate Marvel vs. Capcom 3; Marvel vs. Capcom: Infinite; Tatsunoko vs. Capcom; Pocket Fighter; Puzzle Fighter; Namco × Capcom; Project X Zone; Project X Zone 2; SNK vs. Capcom: The Match of the Millennium; Puzzle Spirits
Pyron	Nobuyuki Hiyama	Pyron (パイロン, Pairon) is an alien that resembles living fire, seeking to conquer Earth as a prize. He acts as the main antagonist, and is an unplayable boss in the first Darkstalkers title.	Capcom Fighting Evolution; Project X Zone 2
Rikuo	Yūji Ueda	Rikuo, called Aulbath (オルバス, Orubasu) in Japan, is a merman who believes himself the sole survivor of his race after an Earthquake in the Amazon caused by Pyron devastates his kingdom. After discovering survivors, he has a son, who he rescues in Vampire Savior only to discover another race of merfolk. The name Rikuo is derived from actor Ricou Browning, who played the titular creature in The Creature from the Black Lagoon.	
Sasquatch	Kan Tokumaru	Sasquatch (サスカッチ, Sasukatchi) is a rotund Yeti who travels from Canada to investigate Pyron after the alien's arrival. Upon returning home in Vampire Savior, he discovers his people have been kidnapped, and tries to rescue them.	
Victor	Kan Tokumaru	Victor von Gerdenheim (ビクトル・フォン・ゲルデンハイム, Bikutoru fon Gerudenhaimu) is a large German humanoid modeled after Frankenstein's Monster. Seeking to fight Pyron to prove to his creator that he is the strongest in the world, he returns home, where his is informed by his "sister", a homonculus named Emily, that their creator was already dead. In Vampire Savior, after Emily starts to malfunction, he sacrifices himself to revive her.	

=== Introduced in Night Warriors: Darkstalkers' Revenge ===
Night Warriors: Darkstalkers' Revenge is an upgraded version of the previous game, with the same story and returning cast. In addition, several new characters were added to the game, and the boss characters Pyron and Huitzil were made playable.

Name	Voiced by	Description	Other major appearances
Anita	Kyoko Hikami	Anita (アニタ, Anita) is a small, young girl that travels with Donovan, emotionless and mute after a tragedy befell her family. After Donovan is consumed by the evil of those he's killed, she recovers, and as an adult wonders what became of him.	Marvel Super Heroes
Donovan	Nobuyuki Hiyama; Jurota Kosugi (Vampire Savior)	Donovan Baine (ドノヴァン・バイン, Donovan Bain) is a dhampir monster hunter with a massive sword with a curved end. Acting as a buddhist monk, he does so to atone for his own "cursed" blood. However the evil of those he kills infects him and drives him insane.	Super Puzzle Fighter II Turbo
Hsien-Ko	Expand: Michiko Neya; Kae Araki (Puzzle Fighter); Saori Hayami (Marvel vs. Capcom 3, Project X Zone); Hunter MacKenzie Austin (Marvel vs. Capcom 3)	Hsien-Ko, called Lei-Lei (レイレイ, Rei-Rei) in Japan, is a jiangshi, with her sister Mei-Ling (known in Japan as Lin-Lin (リンリン, Rin-Rin)) acting as a seal to help keep her powers in check. Seeking to free their mother's soul from a powerful curse, they succeed, and are reincarnated as a pair of young girls. They are pulled into Jedah's domain during the events of Vampire Savior, where they can assume their previous forms, and eventually return home. Hsien-Ko has her own mobile game, Magical Hammer. The game was remade as the Japanese-exclusive Line Drop: Spirit Hunter Lei-Lei. She was originally planned to be playable in Tatsunoko vs. Capcom, but was dropped due to time constraints.	Pocket Fighter; Puzzle Fighter; Marvel vs. Capcom 3 Namco × Capcom; Project X Zone

=== Introduced in Vampire Savior ===
Vampire Savior (also titled Darkstalkers 3 in some releases) was the first actual sequel title, introducing several new characters and a new storyline. While originally Pyron, Donovan and Huitzil did not return, variations of the game were released that did, including Vampire Hunter 2 and Vampire Savior 2. The PlayStation port included the cast as a whole, with new story mode endings provided for the originally cut trio. Years later Vampire: Darkstalkers Collection included a special version of Vampire Savior with one more additional character, Dee.

In addition to the characters listed below, two 'characters' are playable by inputting special controller inputs: Marionette, which will take the form of the opponent's character, and Shadow, which assigns the player a random character at the start and swaps to the last character the player defeated as they progress.

Name	Voiced by	Description	Other major appearances
Baby Bonnie Hood	Miyuki Matsushita	Baby Bonnie Hood, known as Bulleta (バレッタ, Baretta) in Japan, is a young girl armed with an uzi and several explosives. Dressed similarly to Little Red Riding Hood, she travels with her dog Harry and hunts monsters for money. She is intended to personify everything dark and depraved in the human spirit.	Expand: Cannon Spike; Marvel vs. Capcom 2; SNK vs. Capcom: The Match of the Millennium; Onimusha Soul; Project X Zone 2
Dee	Jurota Kosugi	A corrupted version of Donovan, wearing an outfit that resembles Demitri's while using his original sword. Originally intended to appear in Vampire Savior, Dee suffers from short-term memory loss, and will rapidly forget events as they transpire. In his ending, he is put to rest finally by a now-adult Anita.	
Jedah Dohma	Isshin Chiba; David Kaye (MvC Infinite); Travis Willingham (Cross Edge)	Jedah Dohma (ジェダ・ドーマ, Jeda Dōma) is the main antagonist of Vampire Savior. A nobleman demon in Makai, he was originally destroyed, but was later resurrected. Finding that Makai has devolved into chaos, he seeks to combine all the souls into one singular being, luring the other character to his domain. Jedah's body is able to shapeshift and recover quickly from self-maiming, allowing him to weaponize his own blood. In early drafts of the game, he was originally intended to be Morrigan's brother.	Capcom Fighting Evolution; Marvel vs. Capcom: Infinite; Cross Edge; Project X Zone
Lilith	Expand: Hiroko Konishi; Yuka Imai (Namco x Capcom, Cross Edge); Miyuki Sawashiro (Onimusha Soul)	Lilith (リリス, Ririsu) is a fragment of Morrigan's soul separated from her as an infant to keep her power in check. Jedah later discovers this fragment, and after giving it a form resembling a younger Morrigan with pink short hair, tasks her with luring worthy souls to his domain. Meanwhile, Lilith seeks to reunite and take control of Morrigan's body, which she sees as rightfully hers. Lilith was originally designed to be androgynous, with her gender officially listed as "Unknown".	Namco x Capcom|Cross Edge|Onimusha Soul|Marvel vs. Capcom
Q-Bee	Miyuki Matsushita; Arisa Nishiguchi (Project X Zone)	Q-Bee (キュービィ, Kyū Bī), short for "Queen Bee", is from a race of humanoid insects called Soul Bees that at one time served Jedah. Driven near extinction after his initial death, they now seek to consume and breed rapidly.	Namco x Capcom; Project X Zone; Project X Zone 2

== Related media ==
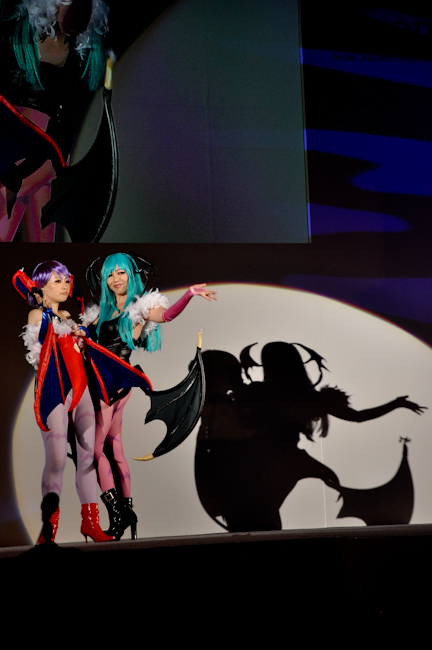
Cosplayers of Lilith and Morrigan on stage at Tokyo Game Show 2011

=== Books ===
Darkstalkers is a Canadian comic book series created by UDON and originally published through Devil's Due Publishing. There are many Darkstalkers manga books and series (including yonkoma parodies). A few of them were also published in North America:

- A manga adaptation authored by Run Ishida and published in Japan by ASCII in 1996. This manga was adapted by Viz Media under the title of Night Warriors: The Comic Series and published in 1998 as a six-issue comic book which were later collected in a single trade paperback volume.
- A one-shot Red Earth crossover manga Darkstalkers / Red Earth: Maleficarum authored by Mami Itou in 1997. It was released in English by UDON Comics in 2010.

Multiple other books (guide books, art books, illustrated books, and novels) were published as well, mostly in Japan only. However, some of them were also published in North America:

- In 2008, UDON released the Darkstalkers Graphic File, a collection of screenshots, storyboards and concept art from the series.
- In 2009, UDON released a 15th anniversary art book Darkstalkers Tribute. It consists of submitted artwork from fans of the series, along with artwork from some of UDON and Capcom's own artists and several famous manga artists such as Yasuhiro Nightow. The book was first available in August at several anime conventions before being widely released the following September.
- In 2014, UDON released a 20th anniversary art book Darkstalkers Official Complete Works that "collects the artwork of every Darkstalkers game, including key visuals, character illustrations, promotional artwork, rough concepts, and creator commentary", as well as "multiple new interviews with the creators behind the series, plus all-new tribute pin-ups" from Capcom artists.

=== Animated series ===
Night Warriors: Darkstalkers' Revenge (originally titled Vampire Hunter: The Animated Series (ヴァンパイアハンター THE ANIMATED SERIES) in Japan) is a four-episode Original Video Animation anime series by Madhouse under license from Capcom, directed by Masashi Ikeda and originally released in 1997–1998.

Darkstalkers (also known as Darkstalkers: The Animated Series) is an American children's animated TV series produced by Graz Entertainment and aired in broadcast syndication from September to December 1995. It was only loosely based on the games and ran for one season of thirteen episodes.

=== Soundtracks ===
Soundtrack CDs for Darkstalkers games were released in Japan under different record labels including Sony Records, Suleputer and Victor Entertainment. A collection of original tracks from the games, previously included as a part of Vampire Sound Box in Japan, was released digitally by Sumthing Distribution in 2014.

=== Pachislo ===
Vampire (ヴァンパイア) is a pachislo game using the series' license was announced on May 12, 2009, and released on July 6, 2009. The game was released by the Capcom subsidiary, Enterrise (エンターライズ, Entarāizu) featuring the cast of the original Darkstalkers: The Night Warriors, although the game's website utilized artwork from Vampire Savior along with new secondary characters exclusive to only this title.

== Reception ==
Aggregate review scores
Game	Metacritic
Darkstalkers Chronicle: The Chaos Tower	74/100
Darkstalkers Resurrection	82/10 (X360); 80/100 (PS3)

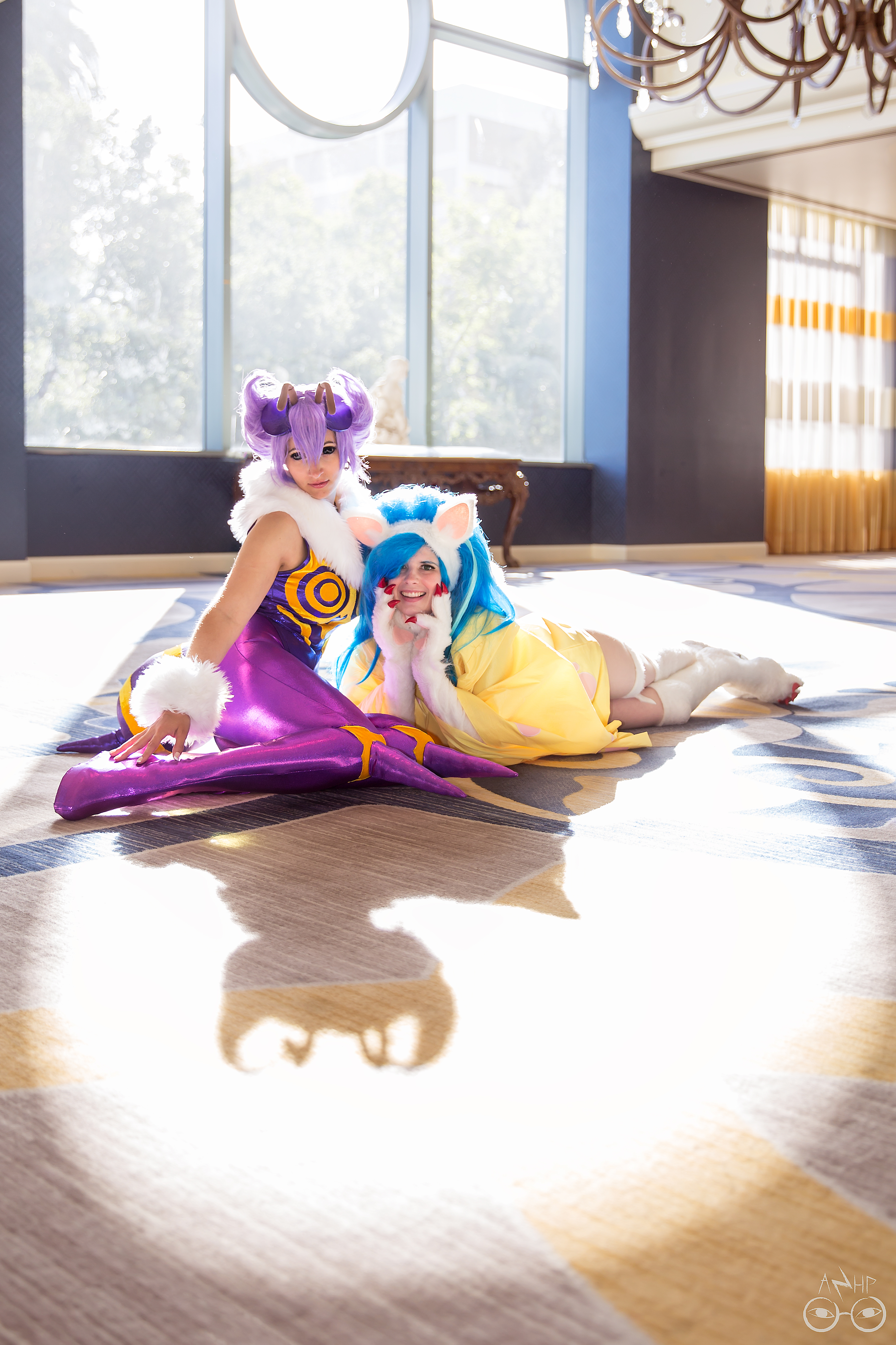
Felicia and Q-Bee cosplayers at FanimeCon 2014 in California

Despite its limited commercial success, Darkstalkers was very well received by critics and acquired a sizable cult following. Destructoid's Kyle Mac Gregor described it as "beloved", and IGN's Richard George described it as both "obscure and beloved". According to MTV, although Darkstalkers "has developed a loyal fanbase over the years, it was never enough for the developer/publisher to give the series much attention". Including Darkstalkers in their list of video game franchises "founded on boobs", GamesRadar US called it "second only to Final Fantasy as an object of Japanophilic cosplay figurine collector worship. While the character design in immensely cool, some of the fan art is downright disturbing". Keith Stuart of The Guardian ranked the series fourth in his 2012 top list of vampiric video games, citing its "beautiful visuals and superb animation".

The cast of characters for the franchise has been credited with making the games "a standout among the fighting games of the era", as instead of "conventional cast of martial artists with the occasional odd creature, Darkstalkers was a gallery of monsters". Hardcore Gaming 101 stated that the game's colorful cast earned the game a cult following, despite its relative lack of recognition.

GamesRadar's Lucas Sullivan ranked Darkstalkers first on his 2012 list of "obscure" fighting games deserving an HD remake, opining it "offers just as much 2D fighting goodness as the venerable Street Fighter series, but it's never gotten the same kind of respect ... and that just ain't right". UGO.com included Darkstalkers on their 2010 list of the games that need sequels. Complex writers put Darkstalkers at number 40 in their 2012 ranking of best video game franchises, adding that they would "love to see a modern incarnation", and listed a hypothetical Darkstalkers 4 among the 15 games they wished would be announced at E3 2011. The magazine's Andrew Hayward ranked Darkstalkers first on his 2011 list of most missed fighting franchises, stating that "every time Capcom announces a new fighting game, the hardcore community gets whipped up about Darkstalkers' continual absence, and demands a modern iteration. The supernatural 2D franchise wasn't a big hit, but fervent fans have kept its name alive and seem unwilling to let it fade away".

One attack from the game's cast, "Midnight Bliss", has also received significant praise on its own. A move where Demitri will charge forward and temporarily transform the opponent into a girl before draining their blood, it has been described by Chris Hoffman of GamesRadar+ as one of Capcom's greatest contributions to gaming history. Writer Zoran Iovanovici in an article for Game Developer observed how fans took to the concept, citing it as a mini-genre of a "gender swap" genre among fan artists, crossplayers, and custom fighting game communities such as those built around M.U.G.E.N. The transformed state of The King of Fighters character Goenitz, a priest serving the villain Orochi, proved extremely popular. Appearing as a nun, the fandom dubbed the character "Goeniko" and fleshed her out as a full character for M.U.G.E.N, albeit with a more sexualized design. This later resulted in her appearing in commercial mobile game title The King of Fighters '98 Ultimate Battle OL, as well as in The King of Fighters All Star as "Lady Goenitz" and with a different appearance.
