= Miyuki Matsushita =

Japanese voice actress (born 1969)

- 松下 美由紀
- Born: December 24, 1969 (age 56); Saitama Prefecture, Japan
- Occupation: Voice actress
- Agent: Arts Vision

Miyuki Matsushita (松下 美由紀, Matsushita Miyuki; born December 24, 1969) is a Japanese voice actress affiliated with Arts Vision. She was born in Saitama Prefecture.

== Voice roles ==
=== Anime television series ===
- Bush Baby, Little Angel of the Grasslands (Kate Addleton)
- Saiyuki (manga) (Xiahua)
- The Twelve Kingdoms (Hōrin)
- Wedding Peach (Erika)

=== OVA ===
- Nightmare Campus (Yuko)
- Urotsukidoji (Hime(Kyo-o)

=== Game ===
- Ape Escape (series) (Ukki Pink)
- Blue Breaker Burst (Chimena)
- Dokyusei 2 (Yui Narusawa)
- Fire Woman Matoi-gumi (Lemon)
- Popful Mail (Wriph, Mega CD version)
- Princess Maker 2 (Patricia Hearn)
- Princess Maker Pocket Daisakusen (Patricia Hearn)
- Marvel vs. Capcom 2: New Age of Heroes (B.B. Hood)
- Namco × Capcom (Q-Bee)
- Project X Zone 2 (B.B. Hood, Q-Bee, Otohime)
- Vampire Savior: The Lord of Vampire (B.B. Hood, Q-Bee)
- Variable Geo (Erina Goldsmith)
