= Earth Seeker =

2011 video game

- Developers: Crafts & Meister; Kadokawa Shoten
- Publisher: Enterbrain
- Composers: Yoshino Aoki; Tetsuya Shibata
- Platform: Wii
- Release: JP: 23 June 2011
- Genre: Role-playing game
- Mode: Single-player

Earth Seeker (Note: Earth Seeker (アースシーカー)) is an action role-playing game developed by Crafts & Meister and published by Enterbrain. It was released in Japan in 2011 for the Nintendo Wii, and to date, has not been released in any other regions.

== Gameplay ==
Due to a space fleet crash landing, artifacts from Earth's heritage are scattered throughout another planet. In this action RPG, the player works with their companions to battle monsters while recovering those artifacts. The player starts by preparing for battle and accepting quests in town Upon leaving, the player can fight monsters while exploring the game world. Exploration, battles, and finishing quests lead to acquiring artifacts.

The player may bring up to 6 guardians with them as companions. Guardians can equip weapons from monsters, or made from raw materials, and can wield energy balls of fire, water, wind, and lightning. While the player character does not have a level, guardians level up by repeatedly battling. Players have the chance to contract high level guardians by offering them gifts such as sake. During battle guardians will assist the player by dealing damage to enemies over time.

During battles movement and evasion are conducted in real time. As the player moves they can lock onto enemies to keep the camera focused on their target. For guardians and the player character to perform commands the player must press the A button to stop time, and open the command menu to select the command(s) they will use. Each command consumes action cartridges, which are displayed on the bottom of the screen, and can be recovered over time, and/or restored with items. Additionally, each command has four power levels that can be used, with higher power levels consuming more action cartridges. The player may continue to execute commands so long as they have not exhausted their supply of action cartridges.

== Plot ==
As a nearby black hole was causing Earth to collapse before mankind's eyes, they built thousands of enormous spaceships, packed up everything from Earth, and escaped into the cosmos. However, on their voyage they were hit by a mysterious gamma burst in another star system, and all life on board the ships was wiped out. Still, the ships' computers continued searching for a habitable planet to migrate to, and eventually found one. At the time of landing, the planet's atmosphere and the materials from Earth reacted to one another causing the severely damaged ships to crash land, and the onboard artifacts from earth to be scattered throughout the planet. The ships' computers executed the Earth Life Restoration Program, but due to the damages they had sustained, they created an ecosystem of bizarre monsters and nature. Since then, 1000 years have passed, and a new population of people born from the Earth Life Restoration Program, the Earthsiders, aims to restore Earth and its population, as an adventure on this peculiar planet begins to unfold.

=== Characters ===
- Ferris, playable character; she appears calm, but is a surprisingly short tempered girl.
- Marti, playable character; she gives off the presence of not letting people get close to her, but her true nature is very kind.
- Shanren, playable character; she has a cunning and seductive personality. When the player finishes certain events in the game she becomes playable. Throughout the adventure she is able to cook, heal, and give herself temporary status buffs.
- Grand Elder Rosa, 800 years ago she became the first born female Earthsider. She always rides a mobile life support device.
- Alute, she works in Pangea's development room as a mechanic, and is a mechanics enthusiast who isn't the type to wear makeup.
- Bertha, she is a kind mannered woman who works in the artifact information room.

=== Setting ===
The Earth Life Restoration Program fertilized, and artificially birthed frozen and preserved egg cells, producing new human life, though few men exist. This group, the "Earthsiders", is working to collect Earth's artifacts under Grand Elder Rosa's supervision.

At the beginning it was thought that creatures known as "Guardians" may be native inhabitants of the planet, but they were actually created by the Earth Life Restoration Program. While communication with them through language is cut off, by offering them their favorite sake they will accompany the player on their adventures.

Monsters were born from the Earth Life Restoration Program. Due to the computers running the program initially sending out fragmented information, giant insects with railguns mounted to them, fusions of shrimp and stag beetles with vacuum cleaners, and other misconfigured life forms were created. They are gathering and guarding Earth's artifacts.

== Development ==
The game was released on the Nintendo Wii on June 23, 2011 by Kadokawa Shoten (whose game divisions have since merged into Kadokawa Games)with a CERO A age rating. (Note: CERO is a Japanese game ratings board whose role is similar to the ESRB in North America.) The game was written and produced by Enter Brain, and developed by Craft and Meister. The game's lead designer, Noritaka Funamizu, previously worked on games such as Street Fighter II and Monster Hunter. It was originally scheduled to be on released April 7, 2011. Despite companies like XSEED and Aksys, and Aksys employee Ben Batemen expressing interest, the game was never officially localized outside of Japan. However an English fan translation was released in February 2020 by Brand Newman and their team. Furthermore, an English speaking Facebook group called "Seek for the Earth - Earth Seeker Support" was formed to spread awareness about the game.

== Reception ==
The game was the 20th best selling game of the week in Japan upon its release, selling 4,055 copies. As of 2013, the game had sold 18,769 copies in Japan.

== Related media ==
Earth Seeker: Artifact Guardians was a series of four full color comics authored by Yasuyoshi Uetsu. They were first released as a short term serialization in Famitsu Magazine. Afterwards, they were published and distributed online through Famitsu Comic Clear, and in storefronts as part of the free book Earthseeker: Special Guide.

The Earth Seeker: Lost Number Quest series began being serialized by Famitsu Comic Clear in September 2011. It is written by the same author as Earth Seeker: Artifact Guardians.

Odekake! Earth Seeker was released simultaneously as a companion DSiWare game for Earth Seeker. In this game players participate in 6 mini-games, including marking maps and making food, to earn items that can be transferred to Earth Seeker on Wii.
