= Capcom Fighting Collection =

2022 video game compilation

- Developer: Capcom
- Publisher: Capcom
- Producer: Shuhei Matsumoto
- Series: Darkstalkers; Street Fighter
- Engine: MT Framework
- Platforms: Nintendo Switch; PlayStation 4; Windows; Xbox One
- Release: June 24, 2022
- Genres: Fighting, puzzle
- Modes: Single-player, multiplayer

Capcom Fighting Collection (Note: Capcom Fighting Collection (Japanese: カプコン ファイティング コレクション, Hepburn: Kapukon Faitingu Korekushon)) is a fighting game compilation by Capcom in celebration of the Street Fighter series' 35th anniversary. The collection includes arcade versions of ten games originally released by Capcom between 1994 and 2003, including all five Darkstalkers games. It was released in June 2022 on Nintendo Switch, PlayStation 4, Windows, and Xbox One. A follow-up focusing on the Marvel vs. Capcom series, Marvel vs. Capcom Fighting Collection: Arcade Classics, was released in 2024, while a direct sequel, Capcom Fighting Collection 2, was released in 2025.

== Gameplay ==
Included games
1994	Darkstalkers: The Night Warriors
1995	Night Warriors: Darkstalkers' Revenge
1995	Cyberbots: Fullmetal Madness
1996	Super Puzzle Fighter II Turbo
1996	Red Earth
1997	Vampire Savior: The Lord of Vampire / Darkstalkers 3
1997	Super Gem Fighter Mini Mix / Pocket Fighter
1997	Vampire Hunter 2: Darkstalkers' Revenge
1997	Vampire Savior 2: The Lord of Vampire
1998
1999
2000
2001
2002
2003	Hyper Street Fighter II: The Anniversary Edition

Capcom Fighting Collection is a compilation of arcade versions of nine fighting games and one puzzle game originally developed and published by Capcom. Most prominently, all five arcade entries in the Darkstalkers franchise are included, marking the first time the full series was made available outside Japan. The collection also includes Red Earth for its first ever release outside arcades. The compilation features online play with rollback netcode, training and spectator modes, save states, concept art, design documents, and a music player. Since the titles featured in the compilation are based on the original arcade releases, they lack the added content featured in the home console versions of certain titles, such as Vampire Savior, Cyberbots: Fullmetal Madness, and Super Gem Fighter Mini Mix.

== Release ==
Capcom Fighting Collection was announced following a countdown timer that was published concurrently during the Season Final of Capcom Pro Tour 2021, alongside the reveal of Street Fighter 6, on February 20, 2022, and was released on June 24, 2022 on Nintendo Switch, PlayStation 4, Windows, and Xbox One. A physical edition was distributed worldwide, while a physical bundle of it and Street Fighter 30th Anniversary Collection were also released exclusively in Japan. A digital "Capcom Fighting Bundle" featuring both Fighting Collection and 30th Anniversary Collection was available on all platforms from launch until May 2025, by which point it was replaced by a bundle of both Fighting Collection and Capcom Fighting Collection 2, which was released that month. Pre-orders and early purchases of the collection included digital codes of all new music remixes, original & exclusive illustrations, and Three Wonders for Capcom Arcade 2nd Stadium.

On September 27, 2022, a free update was released for all versions. This update added quality of life features, making existing features more robust, bug fixes both for the collection as a whole and the original games, and some console exclusive changes like ID tags on PlayStation 4 and a bug involving the online leaderboard on Nintendo Switch.

== Reception ==
Reception

Aggregate score
Aggregator	Score
Metacritic	PC: 79/100; NS: 78/100; PS4: 79/100; XONE: 82/100

Review scores
Publication	Score
Destructoid	7/10
GameSpot	7/10
Hardcore Gamer	3.5/5
IGN	8/10
Nintendo Life	8/10
Nintendo World Report	7.5/10
Push Square	9/10
Shacknews	8/10
The Games Machine (Italy)	8.7/10
TouchArcade	3.5/5

Capcom Fighting Collection received "generally favorable" reviews, according to review aggregator platform Metacritic.

GameSpot and Hardcore Gamer praised the approachability of the added mechanics, "perfect" port quality of the compilation, and Red Earth's inclusion, but felt the compilation lacked variety with the overrepresentation of the Darkstalkers franchise, and lamented the exclusion of more forgotten Capcom fighting games. IGN gave heavy praise to the modern rollback netcode and the inclusion of "an impressive museum filled with interesting art and music, and a snappy UI linking everything together", but took minor issue with the absence of cross-platform play and the exclusion of Street Fighter III. Nintendo Life lauded the compilation's "excellent, polished, and accurate" presentation, inclusion of the Darkstalkers franchise and Red Earth, and the "excellent" online net-code. The site also criticized the exclusion of inaccessible titles and the lack of both in-game soft resets and untranslated text in the Vampire Savior games. Push Square was similarly impressed by the game, but thought the gallery content lacked contextualization and that Cyberbots was a poor inclusion. Shacknews liked the additions made to the game, including online play, a lobby system, training modes, and save states, but noted the exclusion of quality of life features from certain games, lack of crossplay, and that some games were "arcade-hard" by default. TouchArcade felt that the Switch version of the compilation included "a pretty good collection of games" but noted that "The overlap with other collections and my bad experiences with the online play keep me from recommending this too enthusiastically...this is still worth picking up for fans of Capcom's fighters."

=== Sales ===
The Nintendo Switch version of Capcom Fighting Collection sold 3,433 physical copies in Japan during its first week of release, making it the fourteenth bestselling retail game of the week in the country. The PlayStation 4 version sold 2,798 physical copies in Japan throughout the same week, making it the sixteenth bestselling retail game in Japan throughout the week.
