= Baby Bonnie Hood =

Darkstalkers character

- Darkstalkers character
- B.B. Hood in Vampire Savior (1997)
- First game: Vampire Savior (1997)
- Based on: Little Red Riding Hood
- Designed by: Akiman
- Voiced by: Miyuki Matsushita

Baby Bonnie Hood, known by the shorthand B.B. Hood and in Japanese as Bulleta, is a character in Capcom's Darkstalkers franchise, introduced in the 1997 fighting game Vampire Savior. She is a red-dressed girl, based on the titular character of the fairy tale Little Red Riding Hood, who displays a cute personality while secretly having a "psychotic" one, with her ultimate goal to hunt monsters for profit. She has appeared in other games, including Marvel vs. Capcom 2 and Cannon Spike. B.B. Hood was designed by Akiman, and internally, people in the development team worried that she may be viewed as otaku pandering.

She has been generally well received, praised for her design and moveset. Her personality switching was discussed by critics, including in the book "The Routledge Companion to Media and Fairy-Tale Cultures" that argued B.B. Hood was a part of a trend to depict Little Red Riding Hood as a "violent avatar" instead of a "child ingénue".

== Concept and creation ==
B.B. Hood was designed by Akiman for Vampire Savior. She is similar to the protagonist from Little Red Riding Hood; she has blonde hair and wears a red hood and dress with a white apron and pantalettes. She has different personalities, being "cute and psychotic" as is needed for a situation. B.B. Hood carries a brown wicker basket with her, which she hides various weapons, such as an uzi, a bomb shaped like an apple, daggers, and missiles. She is called Baby Bonnie Hood in English, while in Japanese, she is called Bulleta. Due to a miscommunication between the development team and Akiman, the development team was confused by the drawing he sent back, unsure who it was and unable to reach him. Internally, B.B. Hood was the subject of some concern, worrying that she may be viewed similarly to Sakura Kasugano, who was viewed by some fans as pandering to otaku. She is voiced in Japanese by Miyuki Matsushita.

== Appearances ==
B.B. Hood first appears in Vampire Savior, working as a "Darkhunter", a profession held by people who hunt "Darkstalkers", a group of supernatural creatures. She also appears in the game SNK vs. Capcom: The Match of the Millennium alongside Morrigan Aensland and Felicia, a crossover between characters from the game companies SNK and Capcom. In the Marvel Comics and Capcom crossover game, Marvel vs. Capcom 2, B.B. Hood appears as a playable character, featuring a similar moveset to her Vampire Savior moveset. She also appears in the shoot 'em up game Cannon Spike alongside other Capcom characters, where she utilizes some moves from Vampire Savior. B.B. Hood appears as an antagonist in the Capcom, Sega, and Bandai Namco crossover game Project X Zone 2. The card building game Onimusha Souls also features her along other Capcom characters. In Dead Rising 3, a costume based on B.B. Hood's was featured in the game as something protagonist Frank West could equip.

B.B. Hood was featured as part of a two-pack set of figures with Jon Talbain. She was also featured as part of the Bishoujo Figure line of figurines, slated to be released in June 2026. The figure comes with an alternative face plate that swaps her smile with a more "maniacal" face with a sharp-tooth grin and slit white eyes.

== Reception ==
Gamest's staff in their Gal's Island series of periodicals found her character strong, stating that she is further enhanced by the comedy of her lines. particularly the voice lines when she moves forward and when she crouches. They felt that she stood out among the cast of Darkstalkers, which they already felt was a unique cast, and noted that this led to her being a popular character with series fans, including her receiving a lot of fan art sent to magazines. They contrasted her with other hunter characters, such as Donovan, stating that she merely hunts for money instead of hunting evil. They felt that this made people perceive her as a more humorous villain, stating that she also uses the Little Red Riding Hood aesthetic to disarm her opponents. They also argued that the way she fight is efficient and meticulous, believing that her ultimate goal of making money keeps her from engaging in a "flashy gunfight". They felt there was a common misconception that she had a split personality, arguing that instead, she uses her sweet personality to keep her abilities concealed and lull people into a false sense of security. They added that, while they perceived this as a cover, they felt that she still liked this kind of personality, and that if she uses this cover while around people she cares about like her grandmother, she must feel positively about this personality.

B.B. Hood has been well received, described by Hardcore Gaming 101 writer Pat R as "the best idea for a fighting game character". The book "The Routledge Companion to Media and Fairy-Tale Cultures" discusses what the authors view as the propensity for the character of Little Red Riding Hood to be changed from a "child ingénue" to a "violent avatar". They discuss how, despite being a violent figure and existence in Darkstalkers' "pastiche gothic-horror universe", B.B. Hood's dog and birds hearkened to the "saccharine past" of Little Red Riding Hood. They also discuss how B.B. Hood subverts the "damsel in distress" trope; where Little Red Riding Hood is killed or saved depending on the version, B.B. Hood is an "ironic and reflexive character who subverts the archetype of the innocent child" through her use of "acquired supernatural powers, independence, and agency". Game Land staff felt that the contrast between her being young and positive and her "serial killer" nature was initially shocking to them, but remarked that seeing her different attacks made them laugh and that fighting games were famous for "crazy" characters like her. Den of Geek writer Gavin Jasper considered her the "true star" of Vampire Savior, stating that she both had an "amazing design" and was enjoyable to play as. He found her concept ironic, believing her to represent the idea that, rather than just being a human, B.B. Hood represents the "monster that is man", arguing that she has some of the worst qualities of humanity.

In a Retronauts podcast, Diamond Feit and Ant Cooke discussed the contrast between a more feminine voice and verbiage, noting how she says "abayo" in a gruff voice, which Feit found funny. They also appreciated her introduction as a monster hunter, feeling that she was a better execution of the concept than Donovan. Commenting on the concern by Capcom that they were pandering to otaku by making a "lolita" character, they both agreed that she did not feel like that kind of character, feeling that she fits in properly. Ant also stated that he first got interested in Darkstalkers after seeing B.B. Hood in SNK vs. Capcom: The Match of the Millennium, stating that he thought she was the coolest fighting game character.
