= Mizuiro Blood =

2007 video game

- Developer: Namco Bandai Games
- Publisher: Namco Bandai Games (Note: Published under the Bandai label)
- Producer: Kenta Kanayama
- Artist: Yukiko Yokoo
- Platform: Nintendo DS
- Release: JP: June 14, 2007
- Genre: Edutainment
- Mode: Single-player

Mizuiro Blood (Note: Japanese: みずいろブラッド, Hepburn: Mizuiro Buraddo; Light Blue Blood) is a hybrid edutainment/minigame compilation video game developed and released in Japan for the Nintendo DS by Namco Bandai Games in 2007.

== Gameplay ==
Mizurio completing a word puzzle minigame

Mizuiro Blood is a hybrid edutainment/minigame compilation video game. The player controls the feminine robot Mizuiro through her school year at the Blood Academy, where she attempts to both graduate and win the respect of her love interest, the siren-donning robot Kato. The game is divided into eight stages, each representing a month of the school year. In these levels, Mizuiro must complete a series of minigames that are controlled through the system's stylus pen. Minigames range from writing puns in katakana and hiragana, to word puzzles similar to shiritori, to completing rhythm game sequences reminiscent of Taiko no Tatsujin. These minigames are time-based and must be completed as quickly as possible. Should the player fail, they are shown a cutscene of Mizuiro being violently killed, such as getting sliced in half, crushed by a 16-ton weight, or being skewered by a pole. Completing a minigame will award a bronze, silver, or gold medal, depending on how well the player did. Earning a certain number of medals allows the player to earn a trophy, some of which are based on older Namco video games, such as Rally-X (1980) and Xevious (1983).

== Reception ==
Reception

Review scores
Publication	Score
Famitsu	33/40
Play	7/10

Award
Publication	Award
Famitsu	Gold Hall of Fame

Famitsu staff awarded Mizuiro Blood the Gold Hall of Fame award. One reviewer was surprised by its dark storyline, especially in comparison to the cute designs of the characters, believing this aspect would only appeal to certain age demographics. Another reviewer praised the minigames for being fresh and having variety, though another was unimpressed with the small number of them. Dai Kohama of Play almost found it arbitrary to give the game a proper score due to its bizarre presentation, which he found strange "even for authentic Japanese people". He believed the quality of the minigames and the strangeness made it worth owning, though noted its extensive use of Japanese and the DS sometimes being unable to recognize the handwriting.
