= Armored Warriors =

1994 video game

- Arcade flyer
- Developer: Capcom
- Publisher: Capcom
- Director: Yoshiki Okamoto
- Composer: Takayuki Iwai
- Platform: Arcade
- Release: October 24, 1994
- Genre: Beat 'em up
- Modes: Single-player, multiplayer
- Arcade system: CP System II

Armored Warriors, known in Japan as Powered Gear: Strategic Variant Armor Equipment (Note: Japanese: パワード ギア：ストラテジック ヴァリアント アーマー イクイプメント, Hepburn: Pawādo Gia: Sutoratejikku Vuarianto Amā Ikuipumento), is a 1994 beat 'em up video game developed and published by Capcom for arcades.

After being included with the Retro-Bit Super Retro-Cade dedicated console, the game would later be released digitally as part of the Capcom Beat 'Em Up Bundle and Capcom Arcade Stadium.

The "Variant Armors" mecha featured in the game were later used for the head-to-head fighting game Cyberbots: Full Metal Madness.

== Gameplay ==
Gameplay screenshot (1 player)

Armored Warriors most prominent feature is its multi-player option, and the ability to augment the players' mechs with a large array of different parts for varied attacks. Multiple regions of the mech could be switched, including the arms, legs and handheld weaponry. Such parts were gained (or lost) by inflicting damage upon enemies, which would cause various parts to disembark and be wielded by the player. Additionally, by using commands, the players could use an option called a "Team-up Change" which initiated a powerful attack used in tandem, and could also further vary the customization of weapons by using a main and sub-weapon.

Gameplay follows a mission-like structure, with seven in total. Each stage consists of the game giving the player prerequisites such as a time-limit to eliminate enemies, a set amount of ammunition for weapons, and destroying a varying number of enemies. Each stage ended with a boss character, and the game provided a competent replay value with the customization options.

== Plot ==
In the year 2281, the United Earth Government and the Principalities of Raia signed a ceasefire treaty, ending a war that lasted for half a century. One year after the signing of the treaty, the United Earth Government's 18th scouting party reported that the Raian capital, Melkide, has been captured by an army of unknown origin. The United Earth Government decided to dispatch an army to Raia to retake the capital and rescue its citizens, but unbeknownst to the general public, the true purpose of this operation was to eliminate the unknown enemy and bring Raia under Earth's control.

== Reception ==
In Japan, Game Machine listed Armored Warriors on their December 1, 1994 issue as being the sixth most-successful table arcade unit of the month.

In 2023, Time Extension included the game on their top 25 "Best Beat 'Em Ups of All Time" list.

== See also ==
- List of beat 'em ups
