= Darkstalkers: The Night Warriors =

1994 video game

- Arcade flyer
- Developers: Capcom, Psygnosis (PlayStation)
- Publishers: WW: Capcom; EU: Virgin Interactive Entertainment (PlayStation)
- Producer: Yoshiki Okamoto
- Designer: Junichi Ohno
- Artist: Akira Yasuda
- Composers: Takayuki Iwai; Hideki Okugawa
- Series: Darkstalkers
- Platforms: Arcade, PlayStation, PlayStation 2, Switch, PlayStation 4, Windows, Xbox One
- Release: Arcade: JP: July 12, 1994; WW: July 1994; PlayStation: JP: March 22, 1996; NA: June 6, 1996; EU: November 1996
- Genre: Fighting
- Modes: Single-player, multiplayer
- Arcade system: CP System II

Darkstalkers: The Night Warriors, known in Japan as Vampire: The Night Warriors (ヴァンパイア ザ ナイト ウォーリアー, Vanpaia Za Naito Wōriā), is a 1994 fighting game developed and released by Capcom originally for the CPS II arcade hardware as the first game in the Darkstalkers series. It was ported to the PlayStation in 1996, and was followed by Night Warriors: Darkstalkers' Revenge in 1995. In later years, the game was re-released on the PlayStation Network, and most recently has been released as part of Capcom Fighting Collection in 2022 on various platforms.

== Gameplay ==
Arcade version screenshot showcasing a match between Morrigan Aensland and Felicia

Darkstalkers: The Night Warriors features ten playable monsters: Demitri Maximoff, Jon Talbain, Victor von Gerdenheim, Lord Raptor, Morrigan Aensland, Anakaris, Felicia, Bishamon, Rikuo, and Sasquatch. In single-player mode, the player chooses one character and must fight each of the other nine in a series of one-on-one matches. Each round is timed, and each fighter has a health meter. In order to win a round, the player must either completely drain the opponent's health meter, or have more health remaining when time runs out; the first fighter to win two rounds wins the match. After defeating the other nine characters, the player faces two boss characters, the robot Huitzil and the alien Pyron.

A second player may join the game at any time, at which point the two players select characters and fight each other under the above rules; they may choose the same character if desired. The winner of this fight continues the game in single-player mode.

The game uses the gameplay system Capcom developed for the Street Fighter II series, but with several new gameplay features such as Air Blocking, Crouch Walking and Chain Combos. The game featured a Special meter similar to the Super Combo gauge from Super Street Fighter II Turbo, which the player could fill up to perform either a unique "combo"-type move much like the previous Super Turbo (called "EX" in the Darkstalkers series), or a powered-up version of one of their specials (called "ES", and a concept which would appear in later Darkstalkers games as well as Street Fighter III). Unlike the Super Combo gauge in Super Turbo, the Special in Darkstalkers gradually drains unless the player performs their super move, preventing players from preserving their super moves for later use.

== Plot ==
Demitri Maximoff decides to hold a tournament on Earth to see which of the Darkstalkers is worthy enough to rule over the Demon World. The intergalactic being Pyron decides to enter the tournament, as he believes he should rule over the Darkstalkers.

== Development ==
The game originally began development when Capcom created the CPS-II arcade board. While Super Street Fighter II Turbo was the first game to release on CPS-II as a way to test the engine, the developers wanted to make a wholly original title with the hardware. There are conflicting accounts regarding its origins. According to art director Akira Yasuda, a colleague of his named Akitomo was the one who came up with the idea of a monster fighting game, and it was given form by planner Junichi Ohno (who Yasuda had worked together with on Captain Commando). According to Ohno, the concept of a monster fighting game was suggested by someone during a Capcom brainstorming session, after which he became the main planner for the game, which initially focused on Japanese yokai monsters before incorporating more monsters from across the world. According to producer Alex Jimenez, the title started out as a Universal Monsters game, as he was a big fan of the monsters, but Universal refused to license the characters out, prompting Jimenez to create their own characters; Jimenez claims he did it in about an hour. The developers wanted to make the graphics as dynamic and expressive as possible to push the new hardware, so they turned to classic Warner Bros. and Hanna-Barbera animation for inspiration for the artstyle and character designs.

At the time, Yasuda and several team members were working on an unrelated side-scroller game based on a manga, but the content itself did not follow the manga at all and when Yasuda realized the side-scroller would not succeed he canceled the game. As a result, the entire team was reassigned for the Darkstalkers project. Yasuda had them keep his name out of the ending credits in the game. Capcom planner Haruo Murata, who was one of the members responsible for designing the characters and the world, joined the development team at the request of Noritaka Funamizu. By the time he joined, the game's system was pretty much finished. Each designer was assigned a character or characters for which they would create a personality and story. The background designs were also left up to each designer's discretion. Murata was the first person tasked with bringing all of the separately designed elements together to see how they fit in the big picture.

The development of The Night Warriors was during a time when most fighting games relied on stereotypes for character concepts and the character visuals had minimal variations; feeling that no one was really curious about the characters beyond what they saw on the screen, one of the first things Murata did was to add individuality, memorable traits, and several unique concepts to characters that were being cranked out by the designers. At first the Japanese development team did not think much about the characters' backstory or the 'Demon World' of Darkstalkers; it was the overseas staff who started suggesting several ideas for them. Some of the character names were also influenced by ideas sent from the overseas staff. Murata felt the team made the right choice with regards to the endings' tone; since the game's cast consists of uniquely scary and mostly serious demon characters, the team did not restrict it to happy endings. Murata noted how some of the endings are dark or depressing, where the player is made to feel like the character cannot escape their tragic fate; he felt that made the game more interesting compared to other fighting games at the time.

Capcom entrusted the PlayStation conversion of the game to Psygnosis due to Capcom's inexperience with the PlayStation hardware. The PlayStation version was initially planned for an April 1995 release but experienced a protracted development cycle, ultimately not being released until well after the sequel had arrived on the Sega Saturn. A 32X version was planned at one point but never released.

== Release ==
Darkstalkers (Vampire) was originally released in the Japanese arcades on July 12, 1994. The game was ported to the PlayStation in 1996. This version features a new opening theme, "Trouble Man" composed by Andrew Gold and sung by Eikichi Yazawa, which was used as the theme music for both the American Darkstalkers animated series and the Japanese OVA.

The game was included in Vampire: Darkstalkers Collection, a compilation of all five Darkstalkers arcade games that was released only in Japan for the PlayStation 2 on May 19, 2005. On November 29, 2011, the PlayStation version was released for the PlayStation Network, compatible with both the PlayStation 3 and the PlayStation Portable.

=== Related media ===
Several licensed tie-ins were released for the game in Japan, including:

- Books
  - All About Vampire (Studio Bent Stuff's All About Series Vol.6), a guide book by Dempa Shimbunsha.
  - Vampire no Subete, a guide book published by Keibunsha as part of their "Encyclopedia" series.
  - Vampire (Gamest No.129), an extra issue of Shinseisha's book/magazine Gamest Mook.
  - The Very Best of Vampire (ISBN 4-89366-575-8), a guide/art book written by Famitsu staff and published by ASCII.
  - Mystery of Vampire, backstory/setting essay book co-authored by Gamest and Capcom.
  - Vampire: Midnight Flyer, a novel written by Rei Isaki and published by Famitsu.
- Comic books
  - Vampire: Messenger of the End, a two-volume manga by Hiroaki Wakamiya, published by Kodansha in the Shōnen Magazine Comic series.
  - Vampire Comic Anthology (ISBN 4-88199-138-8) and Vampire Comic Anthology Vol.2 (ISBN 4-88199-164-7), a two-part manga collection of short stories by several authors in the Gamest Comics series, published by Shinseisha.
  - Vampire: The Night Warriors (Amusement Anthology Series 14), a manga collection of short stories published by Hobby Japan Comics.
  - Vampire 4-Koma Ketteiban (ISBN 4-88199-157-4), a Gamest yonkoma manga featuring works by fans and established artists, published by Shinseisha.
  - Vampire, a yonkoma manga published by Hinotama Game Comics as part of their 4-Koma Gag Battle series.
  - Darkstalkers: The Night Warriors, a nine-issue manhua series.
- Soundtrack
  - EX Vampire ~Night Warriors~ (MWCG-0017), a drama CD by published by MediaWorks.
  - Vampire Arcade Game Tracks (SRCL-2969), official soundtrack CD published by Sony Records.
  - The game's soundtrack was also rereleased on July 10, 2013, by Capcom on Suleputer as part of Vampire Sound Box (CPCA-10307~12), a 6-CD box set also collecting the soundtracks for Vampire Hunter, Vampire Savior, and additional tracks. The album was also digitally distributed by Sumthing Digital as Darkstalkers Volume 1.

A manga adaptation authored by Run Ishida was published in Japan by ASCII in 1996. It was later adapted by Viz Comics under the title of Night Warriors: The Comic Series, which was published as a six-issue comic book which were later collected in a single trade paperback volume.

== Reception ==
Reception

Review scores
Publication	Score
AllGame	3.5/5 (PS1)
IGN	6.5/10 (PS1)
Next Generation	3/5 (ARC, PS1)
Dengeki PlayStation	70/100, 75/100, 70/100, 55/100 (PS1)
Maximum	4/5 (PS1)
RePlay	Positive (ARC)
VideoGames	9/10 (ARC)

Award
Publication	Award
VideoGames	Best Arcade Game; Game of the Year (2nd); Best Fighting Game (2nd)

The game was a hit in arcades, selling 24,000 arcade units, making it one of the best-selling arcade fighting games. In Japan, Game Machine listed the game on their August 15, 1994 issue as being the second most-successful table arcade unit of the month. It went on to be the fourth highest-grossing arcade game of 1994 in Japan. In North America, RePlay listed the title as the most-popular arcade game in October 1994, while Play Meter listed it as the sixth most-popular arcade game the same month. It received a Gold Award from the American Amusement Machine Association (AAMA) for being one of America's top nine best-selling arcade video games of 1994.

Darkstalkers: The Night Warriors was generally very well received by critics upon release. VideoGames gave it the award for "Best Arcade Game" of 1994, while also being the second best game in the categories "Game of the Year" and "Best Fighting Game". GamePro gave it a positive review, saying that though it is similar to Street Fighter II, Darkstalkers is highly appealing due to its broad variety of characters, its anime-style art, and the ability to block in midair. Next Generation reviewed the arcade version of the game, and stated that "Superbly rounded out by a spooky soundtrack and plenty of high-impact background images, Dark Stalkers is a good, strong twist on old technology."

Reviewing the PlayStation version, GamePro remarked that the gameplay lacks depth and is too easily mastered, but the game is nonetheless fun, and the graphics are highly attractive. They concluded, "A good concept, strengthened by great graphics and good gameplay, is what makes Darkstalkers one of the better fighting games on the PlayStation. Not as deep as Street Fighter Alpha, but just as fun, Darkstalkers is a welcome addition to the PlayStation library." Yasuhiro Hunter of Maximum, in contrast, argued that Darkstalkers is one of the deepest and most difficult to master fighting games. However, he felt that given the exceptionally long development cycle, the PlayStation conversion was a major disappointment, with half the animation frames of the arcade version missing and bouts of pronounced slowdown. Next Generation said that Darkstalkers "could arguably be the height of development for 2D fighters", but that it is ultimately just another game in the 2D Street Fighter vein and "with the new technology showcasing games like VF2, Tekken, and Toshinden, it just can't compete." IGN similarly commented that "unfortunately, Dark Stalkers [sic] pales in comparison to the bigger 3D monsters that have been released for the Play[S]tation, namely Tekken and Toshinden. But as far as 2D fighters go, Dark Stalkers is still one of the best."

In 2007, CraveOnline users ranked Darkstalkers as the ninth top 2D fighter of all time, with the staff calling it "a Capcom title that was essential in the further development of Capcom's 2-D fighter dominance" and "a surprise hit that paved the way for many great games after it." In 2013, Eurogamer's Matt Edwards stated Darkstalkers "has remained something of a cult favourite thanks to its unique style and technical innovations."
