= Tech Romancer =

1998 video game

- Japanese Dreamcast cover art
- Developer: Capcom
- Publishers: Capcom; Dreamcast: JP/NA: Capcom; PAL: Virgin Interactive
- Composer: Yuki Iwai
- Platforms: Arcade, Dreamcast
- Release: Arcade: JP: September 1998; NA: November 1998; Dreamcast: JP: January 13, 2000; NA: June 15, 2000; EU: July 7, 2000; JP: January 18, 2001 (for Matching Service)
- Genres: Fighting; Mecha; Super Robot; Real Robot
- Modes: Single-player, multiplayer
- Arcade system: Sony ZN-2

Tech Romancer (Note: Japanese: 超鋼戦紀キカイオー, Hepburn: Chōkō Senki Kikaiō; "Chronicle of Super Steel Warrior Kikaioh") is a 1998 3D fighting arcade game by Capcom that draws heavily from the various subgenres of mecha anime. It was later ported to the Dreamcast console. The player controls a giant robot which is used to fight another robot in one-on-one combat. Studio Nue designed the robots in this game.

== Story ==
The setting of Tech Romancer takes place in a far future of Earth, where advanced technology have made things calm and decent for the citizens of Japan and the rest of the world. However, the peace doesn't last long as an evil alien tyrant named Goldibus invades the planet with its loyal followers and seeks to conquer the world while enslaving the human race with an emotionless iron fist. An unlikely group of heroes band together to fight against the threat of Goldibus with their own unique mecha robots and all of them won't rest until Goldibus is defeated and the world is safe from the imminent danger.

== Game modes ==
The game is primarily played in two modes: Story Mode, and Hero Challenge Mode. The Dreamcast version also had minigames that could be played on the VMU for points.

A screenshot from Tech Romancer's gameplay

=== Story Mode ===
Each mecha has its own story mode, which plays out like an anime series, with each battle broken up by an episode title, eyecatch, and dialog scenes before and after each battle. Each mecha has its own story (where it is the star of its own show), and decisions made in the dialog scenes, as well as the conditions under which a battle is won, can cause some stories to branch out and have multiple paths and endings. The other mecha and characters naturally make appearances, but their role may vary from their actual origins to fit the "star" mecha's story.

=== Hero Challenge Mode ===
An "Arcade-style" mode where the player fights through each of the major mecha and bosses. Various hidden mecha and pilots found in the game can only be used in Hero Challenge Mode. In the Dreamcast version, points earned in Hero Challenge Mode and the VMU minigames could be used to purchase hidden characters including boss characters and movies.

=== Matching Service ===
In Japan, the game is re-released as "Choukou Senki Kikaioh For Matching Service" because of its online functionality.

== Gameplay ==
Battles take place mostly on a flat 3D plane, with buildings and other terrain features scattered around. Destroying the terrain (by attacking or walking through them) releases power-ups, which include three weapons (vary between each character/mecha), armor or life powerups, and the Hero Mode powerup, which increases the power of your mecha's attacks, and may also unlock additional abilities or moves.

Rather than rounds, the matches are decided by the life meters of the fighters. Each fighter has two life meters, and is destroyed when the second one is depleted. In addition, each mecha gets an armor gauge that, when broken by consistent brute attacks, lowers the mecha's defense and makes it harder to recover from attacks received.

Each mecha has at least two super attacks, as well as a Final Attack, which is usable when the opponent is down to the last 50% of their second lifebar. This attack, when activated and successfully connected, automatically destroys the opponent, winning the battle.

== Reception ==
Reception

Aggregate score
Aggregator	Score
GameRankings	78%

Review scores
Publication	Score
AllGame	3.5/5
CNET Gamecenter	6/10
Electronic Gaming Monthly	8.17/10 (Note: In Electronic Gaming Monthly's review of the Dreamcast version, two critics gave it each a score of 8/10, and the other gave it 8.5/10.)
EP Daily	8.5/10
Eurogamer	7/10
Famitsu	29/40
Game Informer	8.5/10
GameFan	(J.W.) 75% (L.B.) 68%
GameRevolution	B−
GameSpot	8.6/10
GameSpy	8/10
IGN	8.9/10
Next Generation	3/5

In Japan, Game Machine listed the arcade version in their November 15, 1998 issue as the fourth most-successful arcade game of the week.

The Dreamcast version received favorable reviews. In Japan, Famitsu gave it a score of 29 out of 40, just one point away from Silver Awards Editors' Choice. Greg Orlando of NextGen said of the game, "It's not often when we get to step into our favorite anime and beat some metal ass. Now if only the fighting were as inspired as the off-the-wall anime plot..." James Mielke of GameSpot described the game as "a combination of great graphics and solid fighting fun". He noted that the game contains more replay value than JoJo's Bizarre Adventure, Street Fighter III, and Plasma Sword: Nightmare of Bilstein combined. Anoop Gantayat of IGN described the game as having "the greatest single player mode ever in a fighting game" through both the game's Power Stone-style rewards system and story mode which contained branching paths and multiple endings for the playable characters. BenT of PlanetDreamcast described the game as "a great surprise from Capcom" due to its Japanese anime stylings and superb character design, as well as the simple yet addictive gameplay, but criticized the overly simplistic gameplay and underwhelming graphics compare to other titles released for the Dreamcast around the same time (most notably Resident Evil – Code: Veronica which was also made by Capcom and MDK2 from Bioware).

Kilo Watt of GamePro said of the game in one review, "If you're purely a fighting game fan or casual gamer, you might want to pass on Tech Romancer since it's not the pinnacle of robot fighting. For avid mech anime fans, this is one of those games you've dreamed about." (Note: GamePro gave the Dreamcast version two 4.5/5 scores for graphics and fun factor, 5/5 for sound, and 4/5 for control in one review.) In another GamePro review, however, Jake The Snake said that the game "will appeal to serious fighting game fans who like the anime-style mech basher, but casual button-mashers and mech game fans may want to pass or rent first." (Note: GamePro gave the Dreamcast version 4/5 for graphics, and three 3.5/5 scores for sound, control, and fun factor in another review.)

GameRevolution listed Tech Romancer as 44th on their list of the 50 Worst Game Names Ever.
