= Night Warriors: Darkstalkers' Revenge =

1995 video game

- Japanese arcade flyer
- Developer: Capcom
- Publisher: Capcom: EU: Virgin Interactive Entertainment
- Producer: Yoshiki Okamoto
- Composers: Takayuki Iwai; Akari Kaida; Hideki Okugawa
- Series: Darkstalkers
- Platforms: Arcade, Sega Saturn
- Release: Arcade: JP: March 1995; WW: May 1995; Saturn: JP: February 23, 1996; NA: March 29, 1996; EU: November 1996
- Genre: Fighting
- Modes: Single-player, multiplayer
- Arcade system: CP System II

Night Warriors: Darkstalkers' Revenge, known in Japan as Vampire Hunter: Darkstalkers' Revenge (Note: Japanese: ヴァンパイア ハンター ダークストーカーズ レベンジ, Hepburn: Vanpaia Hantā Dākusutōkāzu Rebenji), is a 1995 fighting game developed and published by Capcom for arcades. It is the second game in the Darkstalkers series, following Darkstalkers: The Night Warriors (1994). Darkstalkers' Revenge was ported to the Sega Saturn home console in 1996 and was later followed by a sequel, Vampire Savior / Darkstalkers 3 (1997).

In later years, Darkstalkers' Revenge was released as part of the compilations Vampire: Darkstalkers Collection in 2005, Darkstalkers Resurrection in 2013, and Capcom Fighting Collection in 2022.

== Gameplay ==
A gameplay screenshot of Night Warriors: Darkstalkers' Revenge

Night Warriors is a 2D competitive fighting game. It features several changes to the gameplay system of its predecessor, Darkstalkers: The Night Warriors. One of these changes is an introduction of the chain combos. Players can also choose between a "normal" gameplay style or one that offers auto-blocking.

The main change in Night Warriors is the ability for the player to stock up on their Special gauge, allowing them to store more than one Special gauge and preserve them through the entire match. Two types of Super Moves are featured in the game: ES Specials, requiring a portion of the Special gauge, and EX Specials, requiring an entire stock of the Special gauge to perform.

The game also introduces two new playable characters, Donovan Baine and Hsien-Ko. In addition, the two bosses from the first game, Huitzil and Pyron, are now playable characters as well.

== Plot ==
Despite being considered a sequel to Darkstalkers: The Night Warriors, Night Warriors: Darkstalkers' Revenge has the same plot and endings as the previous game, only adding stories and endings to the new characters and the (now playable) bosses.

Pyron invades Earth to add to his collection of planets that he has devoured. The world's most fearsome monsters are the last defense of mankind. Two darkstalker hunters make their presence known and join in the fray. Donovan Baine and Hsien-Ko are "Dark Hunters" who are out to hunt the other Darkstalkers in the game (hence the Japanese title, Vampire Hunter).

== Development ==
In an interview with Mean Machines Sega, Capcom stated that Vampire Hunter used twice as much character data as the original Darkstalkers, allowing for additional animation patterns across its roster. The company estimated that the sequel featured hundreds of additional animation patterns, although it could not specify precisely how many new moves had been introduced.

Capcom initially announced plans to convert the original Darkstalkers: The Night Warriors, known in Japan as Vampire, to the Sega Saturn in March 1995. By November, the company had shifted its plans to the arcade sequel, Vampire Hunter, which was initially scheduled for a December 29, 1995 release. In an interview with Saturn Fan, Capcom explained that faithfully reproducing the arcade version was its principal development priority, while possible additional features for the Saturn release were still under consideration.

A work-in-progress version was demonstrated to the Japanese gaming press on November 27, 1995. By January 1996, Sega Saturn Magazine reported that the conversion was approximately 60 percent complete, with six of the game's fourteen characters playable. Capcom subsequently completed the conversion of the remaining eight characters ahead of the game's Japanese release on February 23, 1996.

The announcement that a Saturn port of Night Warriors: Darkstalkers' Revenge would be released in December 1995 in Japan, while the PlayStation version of the original Darkstalkers still had no confirmed release date, was met with outrage from PlayStation owners. In explanation for the decision, Capcom representatives said in December 1995: "The reason is the problems we had converting the PlayStation version, which we didn't have with the Saturn. Originally the plan was to release [the] PlayStation [version of] Darkstalkers in April but it fell behind, hence the decision to take the later Vampire Hunter straight to Saturn. We get the user response to release our software as soon as possible, which we have to do, and we also have Darkstalkers 3 lined up for the arcade."

Unlike the PlayStation conversion of the original Darkstalkers, the Saturn version of Vampire Hunter was developed internally by Capcom. The conversion was handled by a different team from the arcade original, although Capcom confirmed that arcade source code was reused in its Saturn conversions. Studio BentStuff, which produced strategy guides for the Saturn release, also assisted Capcom with debugging the conversion, according to a retrospective statement by the studio's Akira Yamashita.

== Release ==
The game was originally released for the Japanese arcades in March 1995. A Sega Saturn port was released in Japan and North America in early 1996. A PAL conversion of the Saturn port was finished by May but the European publisher, Virgin Interactive Entertainment, opted not to release it until November. This version features an "Appendix Mode" that allows players to customize the backgrounds, the opponents' colors and background music between the regular ones and the ones used in the original Darkstalkers. The Saturn conversion also introduced a shortcut selection feature that simplified the character-selection interface to reduce the time before matches began. Additional configuration options included a choice between arcade-style and Saturn-style display sizes.

The game was included in Vampire: Darkstalkers Collection, a compilation of all five Darkstalkers arcade games that were released in Japan only for the PlayStation 2 in 2005. It was also included in a remastered form as part of 2013's Darkstalkers Resurrection for the PlayStation Network and Xbox Live Arcade, and 2022's Capcom Fighting Collection for PlayStation 4, Xbox One, Nintendo Switch, and PC.

=== Related media ===
Several licensed tie-ins were released for the game in Japan, including:

- Books
  - All About Vampire Hunter (18362-06), a guide/art book published by Dempa Shimbunsha as part of Studio Bent Stuff's "All About Deluxe" series.
  - Vampire Hunter (GMC-11), a special issue of Shinseisha's magazine Gamest in the "Gamest Mook" ("magazine book") series.
  - The Vampire Hunter Sega Saturn Manual Ver.1 (ISBN 4-89366-493-X) and The Vampire Hunter Sega Saturn Manual Ver.2 (ISBN 4-89366-505-7), two guide books for the Sega Saturn version, written by Famitsu staff and published by ASCII.
  - Vampire Hunter Perfect Guide (ISBN 4-88199-237-6), a Gamest Mook "EX"-series guide book for the Sega Saturn version, published by Shinseisha.
  - Mystery of Vampire Hunter, backstory/setting essay book co-authored by Gamest and Capcom.
  - Vampire Hunter: Midnight Elegy, a novel written by Rei Isaki and published by Famitsu.
  - Endless Spring and Witch of the Crimson Moon, two side-story novels written by Akihiko Ureshino and published by Gamest.
- Comic books
  - Vampire Hunter: Darkstalkers' Revenge, a two-volume manga collection of short stories by Takeshi Fujita, published by Gamest Comics.
  - Vampire Hunter Comic Anthology (ISBN 4-88199-186-8) and Vampire Hunter Comic Anthology Vol.2 (ISBN 4-88199-206-6), two manga short story anthologies in the Gamest Comics series, created by different artists and published by Shinseisha.
  - Vampire Hunter: Darkstalkers' Revenge (Amusement Anthology Series 17 & 18), two-manga collection of short stories published by Hobby Japan Comics.
  - Vampire Hunter and The Darkness Heroine's Revenge, two manga anthologies in the Shounen Oh Comics series by Hinotama Game Comics.
  - Vampire Comic, a manga anthology by ASCII Comix.
  - Vampire Hunter: Darkstalkers' Revenge, a manga anthology in the Super Game Comic Anthology series by SoftBank.
  - Vampire Hunter: Darkstalkers' Revenge, a manga anthology by Sony Magazines Comics.
  - Vampire Hunter (ISBN 4-88199-194-9 and ISBN 4-88199-261-9), a two-part manga adaptation by Takeshi Fujita, published by Shinseisha.
  - Vampire Hunter 4-Koma Ketteiban (ISBN 4-88199-183-3), a Gamest yonkoma manga collection published by Shinseisha.
  - Vampire Hunter, a yonkoma manga published by Hinotama Game Comics in their 4-Koma Gag Battle series.
  - Vampire Hunter, a yonkoma manga published by Futabasha in their 4-Koma Kingdom series.
- Other
  - Vampire Hunter Gaiden ~ Donovan The Wanderer of Destiny (VICL-8152), a drama CD published by Victor Entertainment.
  - Vampire Hunter Darkstalker's Revenge (ISBN 4-88199-192-2), a VHS video combo guide by Shinseisha.
  - Dance Revolution Vol. 1: Vampire Hunter (VOCR-5011), a remix album released by MEM Records and distributed by BMG Victor.
  - Vampire Hunter: Darkstalkers' Revenge Arcade Gametrack (SRCL-3197~8), a two-CD original soundtrack released by Sony Records.

Vampire Hunter: The Animated Series is a 1997-1998 four-part anime OAV miniseries based on the game and made by Madhouse Studios in association with DR Movie. It was released in the West as Night Warriors: Darkstalkers' Revenge. In Japan, the anime itself was given a two-volume novelization written by Makoto Takeuchi.

== Reception ==
Reception

Review scores
Publication	Score
AllGame	4.5/5 (SAT)
Electronic Gaming Monthly	7.5/10, 8/10, 7/10, 8/10 (SAT) (Note: Reviewer Mike Desmond, was apparently confused about which game the "review crew" was covering, as he is explicitly reviewing not Night Warriors: Darkstalkers' Revenge, but the PlayStation version of Darkstalkers: The Night Warriors. Desmond score is the third score.)
Game Informer	7.5/10 (SAT)
Next Generation	4/5 (Arcade); 3/5 (SAT)
Maximum	5/5 (SAT)
Sega Saturn Magazine	91% (SAT)
VG&CE	9/10 (SAT)

In Japan, Game Machine listed Night Warriors: Darkstalkers' Revenge on their April 15, 1995 issue as being the second most-successful arcade game of the month. In a pre-release review, Japan's Sega Saturn Magazine awarded the Saturn conversion three scores of 9 out of 10, praising its animation, fighting mechanics and faithful reproduction of the arcade game. In the final rankings of the magazine's reader poll, published in 2000, Vampire Hunter placed 91st with an average reader rating of 8.9486 out of 10.

A reviewer for Next Generation stated that the graphics are "dramatically" improved over the original Darkstalkers, and that the new special moves system adds a strategic element to the game and saves it from being a mere remake of the original. He concluded that "Night Warriors doesn't break new ground, but the bottom line here is that it is done really well".

The Sega Saturn version of Night Warriors: Darkstalkers' Revenge received positive reviews upon its release. VideoGames called the game "a must-purchase for fight fans and Saturn owners". Game Informer described it as a "truly unique fighter" because of its gameplay system, regarded as an unusual for a 2D fighting game, adding that the game is "definitely amazing to look at" due to its "outstanding" and "truly spectacular" animation. GameFan called it "one of Capcom's best fighters to date", with "quite possibly the best animation on a home fighting game yet" (rivaled only by Samurai Shodown III for the Neo Geo CD), describing it as "an amazing translation, and a big improvement over X-Men" and "a Saturn exclusive you must own." The four reviewers of Electronic Gaming Monthly described it as "a near-perfect translation" and praised the variety of characters, though they felt that the game was rather old compared to other recent arcade fighting games from Capcom. Rad Automatic of Sega Saturn Magazine similarly called it "practically arcade perfect" and praised the variety of characters while questioning if it was good as Capcom's other recent Saturn fighting games. A Next Generation critic remarked that the game successfully differentiates itself from other Capcom 2D fighters with its macabre character designs and their appropriate move sets. He added, "What's fun about Night Warriors is the fact that anything can happen. The success of the series lies in the fact that each character has a host of twisted maneuvers that take the action to all sorts of extremes, and yet that wonderful chess-like strategy element is still perfectly applicable to the game." Writing in GamePro, Major Mike stated that the game is not as deep as the recent Street Fighter Alpha, but that it makes up for this with its outstanding visual spectacles and easy controls. He also rated the Saturn conversion of the graphics, audio, and visuals as flawless, remarking that "If Capcom keeps this up, arcades may well go out of business." Daniel Jevons of Maximum likewise said that with the full animation option on, "you've got a frame for frame, pixel for pixel, carbon copy of the coin-op, right down to Victor's rippling muscles and the reflections of light on Phobos's armour". He praised the game's imaginative characters, perfect balance, innovative special moves system, and huge number of techniques, and summarized it as a happy medium between the precision and depth of Street Fighter Alpha and the flash and accessibility of X-Men: Children of the Atom.

Continental European publications were also favourable towards the Saturn conversion. French magazine Consoles + awarded the game 93%, praising its colourful graphics, fluid character animation and accessible yet varied fighting system. Italian magazine Console Mania gave it 92 out of 100, highlighting its character variety, gameplay and replay value. Germany's MAN!AC awarded it 83%, praising its combat mechanics and unusual character roster, although the publication was less impressed by its graphics and sound.

In the June 1996 issue of Computer and Video Games, Night Warriors: Darkstalkers' Revenge ranked seventh on the magazine's American multi-format sales chart. In November 1997, Sega Saturn Magazine ranked the Saturn version of Vampire Hunter as the 13th best-selling game for the console in Japan, with estimated sales of 433,101 copies.

In 2010, Robert Workman ranked it as the fifth best 2-D fighting game ever made, "thanks to its gorgeous animation, fun traditional 2-D gameplay and ridiculously cool character line-up." In a retrospective review, Jon Thompson of AllGame called it "of the finest fighting games available at home". However, ScrewAttack's Arcade Recall criticized Night Warriors for having few changes and additions as compared to the original Darkstalkers. Rich Knight and Gus Turner of Complex included it on their list of 25 best 2D fighting games of all time in 2013.
