= Vampire Savior =

1997 video game

- Japanese arcade flyer
- Developer: Capcom
- Publisher: Capcom: PAL: Virgin Interactive Entertainment
- Producer: Tetsuya Iijima
- Designers: Shinichiro Obata; Hidetoshi Ishizawa; Katsuyuki Kanetaka
- Composers: Takayuki Iwai; Masato Kouda
- Series: Darkstalkers
- Platforms: Arcade, Sega Saturn, PlayStation
- Release: Arcade: JP: May 1997; NA: June 1997; Saturn: JP: April 16, 1998; PlayStation: JP: November 5, 1998; PAL: November 18, 1998; NA: November 30, 1998
- Genre: Fighting
- Modes: Single-player, multiplayer
- Arcade system: CP System II

Vampire Savior: The Lord of Vampire (Note: Titled Vampire Savior: World of Darkness in initial North American arcade releases, and Vampire Savior: The Lord of Vampire (ヴァンパイア セイヴァー ロード オブ ヴァンパイア, Vanpaia Seivā Rōdo obu Vanpaia) in Japan and subsequent North American releases) is a 1997 fighting game developed and published by Capcom for arcades. It is the third game in the Darkstalkers series. The story centers around a demonic nobleman from Makai named Jedah Dohma, who creates a pocket dimension named Majigen where he tries to bring in souls to help nourish his new world. It was critically and commercially well received.

The release of Vampire Savior was closely followed by modified arcade versions in Japan, titled Vampire Hunter 2 and Vampire Savior 2. Subsequent home console ports for the Sega Saturn and PlayStation compiled the gameplay options and rosters from all three versions. The PlayStation version was released worldwide and titled Darkstalkers 3 in North America and Europe.

== Gameplay ==
Vampire Savior retains the character roster of the previous entry, Night Warriors, omitting Donovan, Huitzil and Pyron from the lineup. Taking their place are four new characters: Jedah, Lilith, Q-Bee and B. B. Hood. It also features Dark Talbain, an evil counterpart of Jon Talbain who serves as his final opponent and is also a hidden playable character, Oboro Bishamon, a non-playable hidden boss that can be fought when certain criteria are met, as well as Shadow, a secret character/mode where the player assumes the identity of the defeated character for the next fight (e.g. if Morrigan is defeated, then in the next fight, the player will play as Morrigan).

The game eschews the traditional round-based system in favor of what is dubbed the "Damage Gauge System": battles take place during a single round, with each fighter having two life bars and corresponding life markers similar to those in Rare's Killer Instinct. When one fighter loses a life marker after the life bar is emptied, the fighters reset their positions as if starting a new round, but the victorious fighter retains their remaining life bar. When the player is attacked, some of the health lost is displayed in white, which can be recovered if the player does not take any more damage. The game also introduces the "Dark Force System" which uses a bar or super meter to allow players to perform special abilities unique to each character for a limited period. The PlayStation version separates Dark Force into 2 modes from which the player chooses before each match: "Dark Force Change" is the same as the traditional Dark Force mode, whereas "Dark Force Power" is an enhanced mode that takes 2 bars of the super meter and the player can inflict damage that is not recoverable (but will also take non-recoverable damage). In Dark Force Power, the player can still activate their special enhancement, but they have to press a unique button combination rather than it being tied to whether or not the player is in Dark Force mode.

== Plot ==
Jedah Dohma, one of the high nobles of Makai, is resurrected after a premature death long ago. Seeing the current chaotic state of the demon world, he decides that the only way to save Makai is to recreate it. To this end, he conjures a pocket dimension known as Majigen, to which he summons worthy souls to help feed his new world. As luck would have it, those souls belong to the returning Darkstalkers from the first two games, in addition to three newcomers.

== Release ==
Vampire Savior: The Lord of Vampire was first released in Japanese arcades in 1997. The game was originally planned to be released as Darkstalkers: Jedah's Damnation outside of Japan, but this title was never used; the Japanese arcade title was instead changed to Vampire Savior: World of Darkness in the U.S.

Several manga anthologies and strategy guides have been published based on Vampire Savior.

=== Vampire Hunter 2 and Vampire Savior 2 ===
Vampire Hunter 2 (ヴァンパイア ハンター2, Vanpaia Hantā Tsu) and Vampire Savior 2 (ヴァンパイア セイヴァー2, Vanpaia Seivā Tsu) are two simultaneously released Japan-only updated versions of Vampire Savior that were released in arcades in September 1997.

Along with minor tweaks and changes to the characters' move lists and the combo system (removal of air chains), the main changes are in the character rosters. Vampire Hunter 2 uses the roster from Night Warriors (Vampire Hunter in Japan), omitting the characters introduced in Vampire Savior. Vampire Savior 2 features the Vampire Savior roster but omits Jon Talbain (as well as Dark Talbain), Rikuo and Sasquatch, and replaces them with Donovan, Huitzil and Pyron. Both versions feature Oboro Bishamon and Shadow as secret characters, as well as Marionette, with whom the fights consist of "mirror matches" (e.g. Morrigan vs Morrigan, Demitri vs Demitri). Vampire Hunter 2 also retains the music from Vampire Hunter, while Vampire Savior 2 uses the Vampire Savior soundtrack.

=== Home versions ===
A Japan-only Sega Saturn version was released in 1998, which required Capcom's 4MB RAM cartridge. Capcom initially announced that the home version would be exclusive to the Saturn. This version contains all 15 characters from the original Vampire Savior as well as the three Night Warriors characters (Donovan, Huitzil, and Pyron) who were left out of the original arcade release and brought back in Vampire Savior 2/Vampire Hunter 2. Thanks to the 4MB RAM cartridge, this version more faithfully reproduces the 2D-animation fluidity of the arcade than either of the earlier console releases in the series. However, while Shadow is available in the Saturn version, Marionette is not.

Also in 1998, an update of the game was ported for the PlayStation as Vampire Savior: EX Edition in Japan and Darkstalkers 3 in North America and Europe. Although it is an EX version of the third game in the series, it is actually a compilation of Vampire Savior and its two Japan-only arcade updates. This version allows players to use all 18 Night Warriors and the two "hidden characters" (Shadow and Marionette) in all three games. It also features Oboro Bishamon and Dark Talbain as playable characters.

The game was included in Vampire: Darkstalkers Collection, a Japan-only compilation of all five Darkstalkers arcade games that was released for the PlayStation 2 in 2005. The collection also features unlockable secret versions of Vampire Savior, Vampire Hunter 2 and Vampire Savior 2 where all 18 Night Warriors are playable, similar to the PlayStation's EX Edition.

In 2012, the ESRB administered a Teen rating for Darkstalkers 3 as a PSone Classic for the PlayStation 3 and PlayStation Vita. The game was released through PlayStation Network on April 24, 2012.

It was also included in a remastered form as part of the HD remix game Darkstalkers Resurrection for the PlayStation Network and Xbox Live Arcade. Unlike the previous release for this game on the PSN, which used the PS1 version, the remastered edition is based on the original arcade release with added features like online multiplayer. The 2022 release Capcom Fighting Collection on PlayStation 4, Xbox One, Nintendo Switch and Windows includes Vampire Savior, Vampire Hunter 2 and Vampire Savior 2 for the first time internationally as separate entries, with the same HD features and Online Play features as Darkstalkers Resurrection. Vampire Savior is also one of the available games in Capcom Arcade 2nd Stadium.

== Reception ==
Reception

Aggregate score
Aggregator	Score
GameRankings	76% (PlayStation)

Review scores
Publication	Score
Electronic Gaming Monthly	6.6/10
GameSpot	7.9/10 (PlayStation)
IGN	8/10 (PlayStation)
Next Generation	3/5 (Arcade)
Official U.S. PlayStation Magazine	4/5

Vampire Savior was positively received. In Japan, Game Machine listed Vampire Savior on their June 15, 1997 issue as being the second most-successful arcade game of the month. Game Machine also listed Vampire Savior II on their November 15, 1997 issue as being the tenth most-successful arcade game of the month. Next Generation reviewed the arcade version of the game, stating that "the game has its moments, but this series has so far reached its zenith in NightStalkers. DS3 is more of the same - it's fun, but nothing special." GamePro echoed these two conclusions, but in reverse priority: "... Vampire Savior is more of the same 2D fighting-game formula Capcom's been churning out for years. Despite this fact, however, the latest Darkstalkers entry holds up beautifully." They gave it a 4.5 out of 5 for fun factor and control, and a perfect 5.0 for sound and graphics. Both Next Generation and GamePro praised the game's smooth animation and striking special moves.

GameSpot's Jeff Gerstmann hailed it as "easily the best fighter Capcom has put out in years" and noted it is "very well animated," even on the PlayStation, and "has an excellent soundtrack, and the character voices are all terrific." IGN's Randy Nelson described the "surprisingly fluid and animated" as well as "fast, fun, and surprisingly balanced" Darkstalkers 3 as "an exceptional effort from Capcom on a gameplay and technical front" and one of the best 2D fighting games on the PlayStation.

Retrospectively, GamesRadar's Lucas Sullivan included Darkstalkers 3 among other lesser-known fighting game classics deserving HD remakes in 2012, stating that "the game's crisp spritework is a marvel to behold – especially in the backgrounds, which convey the kind of creepy atmosphere that complements the supernatural fighters perfectly." Matt Edwards of Eurogamer opined that "playing it today [in 2013] is akin to playing Third Strike - not because these games are mechanically similar, but because Capcom tends to go the full distance with the second sequel."
