= Chi (Chobits) =

Fictional character from Chobits

- Chobits character
- Chi, as seen in the anime
- First appearance: Manga: Chobits chapter 1 Anime: "Chi Awakens"
- Created by: Clamp
- Voiced by: Japanese: Rie Tanaka (Chobits); Kaori Nazuka (Tsubasa: Reservoir Chronicle); English: Michelle Ruff (Chobits; Credited as Georgette Rose); Trina Nishimura (Tsubasa: Reservoir Chronicle)

In-universe information
- Alias: Elda

Chi (Japanese: ちぃ, Hepburn: Chii), "née" Elda (Japanese: エルダ, Hepburn: Eruda), is a fictional character in the manga series Chobits and its anime adaptation. Chi is a Chobit, a type of personal computer called a persocom that is far more technologically advanced than regular persocoms, and who are said to possess true machine intelligence rather than relying on software programs like other persocoms. She is found by Hideki, a high school graduate who has no idea about her unique abilities or of her past. Over the course of the series Hideki tries to discover what type of persocom Chi is, being told that she is something special. He finds her a job, and has to deal with her being kidnapped at one point. Chi learns about the things around her and what it means to be in love. At the end of the series, Chi finds the person "just for her", and her forgotten identity is revealed, causing Hideki to confront his feelings.

In two interviews describing the series Chi's creators, Clamp, said it would be much easier if computers could speak to you when they had errors. Chi is voiced by Rie Tanaka in the anime and Michelle Ruff in its English dub (credited as Georgette Rose). The manga and anime follow Hideki's find of Chi and their relationship, but differ in the storyline. Chi's critical reception has been mostly positive, with reviewers calling her "cute". In addition to Chobits, she is also a crossover character in the series Tsubasa: Reservoir Chronicle and is referenced in other works.

== Conception and creation ==
In an interview when describing Chi's character, Clamp member Satsuki Igarashi stated "Lately we've been saying that the easiest to understand is Chii from 'Chobits.' Errors occur with computers. Things like 'Although it's fine to speak the instructions' and 'Please fix this problem here' might be spoken in a cute voice." In addition, an explanation for Chobits's plot was given by Igarashi who stated: "The only thing our computer at the time would say was "Error, Error". It never told us, or gave the slightest clue, as to what was the matter." Clamp also describes Chobits as a variation of the "boy living with mysterious girl" genre. Chi's design as a personal computer resulted from Ohkawa's wish to increase the sense of "emotional discomfort" around becoming emotionally involved with something considered to be merely a lifeless machine.

The name "Chobi", came from the name of a cat at the place of Nekoi's former employment, which the group made into "Chobits", as the characters Elda and Freya were twins. In the series, Clamp had Chi's creator, Ichiro Mihara (a character from their shared universe work Angelic Layer), use the word "Chobi" to describe anything he thought was "small and hopelessly adorable"; two Chobi (the sisters Elda and Freya) become "Chobits".

== Appearances ==
=== In the manga ===
Chi first appears atop a trash pile in an alley where she is found by Hideki Motosuwa, a high school graduate who knows very little about computers or the androids known as "persocoms" (personal computers) that have become the fashionable item to have in the city. Unlike other persocoms, her activation switch is located in an unusual place: her crotch. She has difficulty communicating with Hideki at first; the only word that she says is "chi", which becomes her given name, but slowly she learns how to speak. Having no memory of her past life, she is taught by Hideki to perform simple tasks. Hideki's neighbor Shinbo and computer prodigy Minoru determine that Chi is no ordinary persocom, and may be a legendary "Chobit", possessing synthetic intelligence.

At one point Hideki considers having to take on a second job due to his poor financial state. He is eventually able to convince his former employer Hiroyasu Ueda to hire Chi at his bakery during his anniversary sale. Chi eventually finds herself kidnapped by Yoshiyuki Kojima. Yoshiyuki initiates a program that he had created especially for Chi, which is designed to break through her firewalls, and when he embraces and gropes her, Freya intervenes by binding him with wires connected to Chi and releasing a powerful, concussive blast. Hideki and Shinbo find her, and Freya vanishes, causing Chi to collapse from the energy used. She recovers and briefly reunites with Hideki, before losing consciousness. Shinbo then forces Yoshiyuki to transfer his persocom Kotoko's registration to Hideki to prevent Yoshiyuki from deleting her memories, so that a record of his kidnapping exists.

Hideki later learns that before he found Chi, her name was Elda. After Ichiro's wife, Chitose Hibiya, noticed that Freya—the first Chobit who was created to be the daughter she and her husband could never have—was becoming increasingly depressed as time went by, Elda was created to be her younger sister to cheer her up. Freya, however, had fallen in love with Ichiro, and the emotional pain of her unrequited love and her wish to not disturb her parents' happiness eventually caused her to severely malfunction. Elda took Freya's program, which included her mind and memories, into herself to preserve her memory. Before losing her own memories as a result of her actions, Elda requested to be left alone outside, away from her family, so that she would not have the possibility of suffering the same fate as her sister. Her father then gifted her with a program which will delete the recognition programs of all persocoms if she fails to find her soulmate, while her mother authored the children's book series A City with No People, a story within a story about the relationships between persocoms and people, to help Chi in her quest.

Towards the end of the series, Zima and Dita, persocom agents for the Japanese government who know the outcome of Chi's special program, arrive at Hideki's apartment. A minor scuffle ensues between Dita and Chi, before Zima restrains Dita, wishing to see the outcome of Hideki's decision and ultimately too falling under Chi's influence. Hideki confirms his love for Chi, only to find that Freya has taken control of her body. Learning that he can never engage in sexual intercourse with Chi without rebooting her systems, erasing everything that makes her a unique individual, Hideki states that he will love Chi regardless. Freya confirms that while Chi and herself are indeed the legendary Chobits, they possess neither sentience nor emotions, but rely on software programs just like every persocom. Again, Hideki stands by his love for Chi. Hideki declines her offer to tell him about Chi's special ability, and Freya vanishes after imploring him to take care of her sister. Chi awakens, embracing Hideki. The series ends with Chi holding Hideki's hand with visible rings Chi had chosen for the two of them.

=== In the anime ===
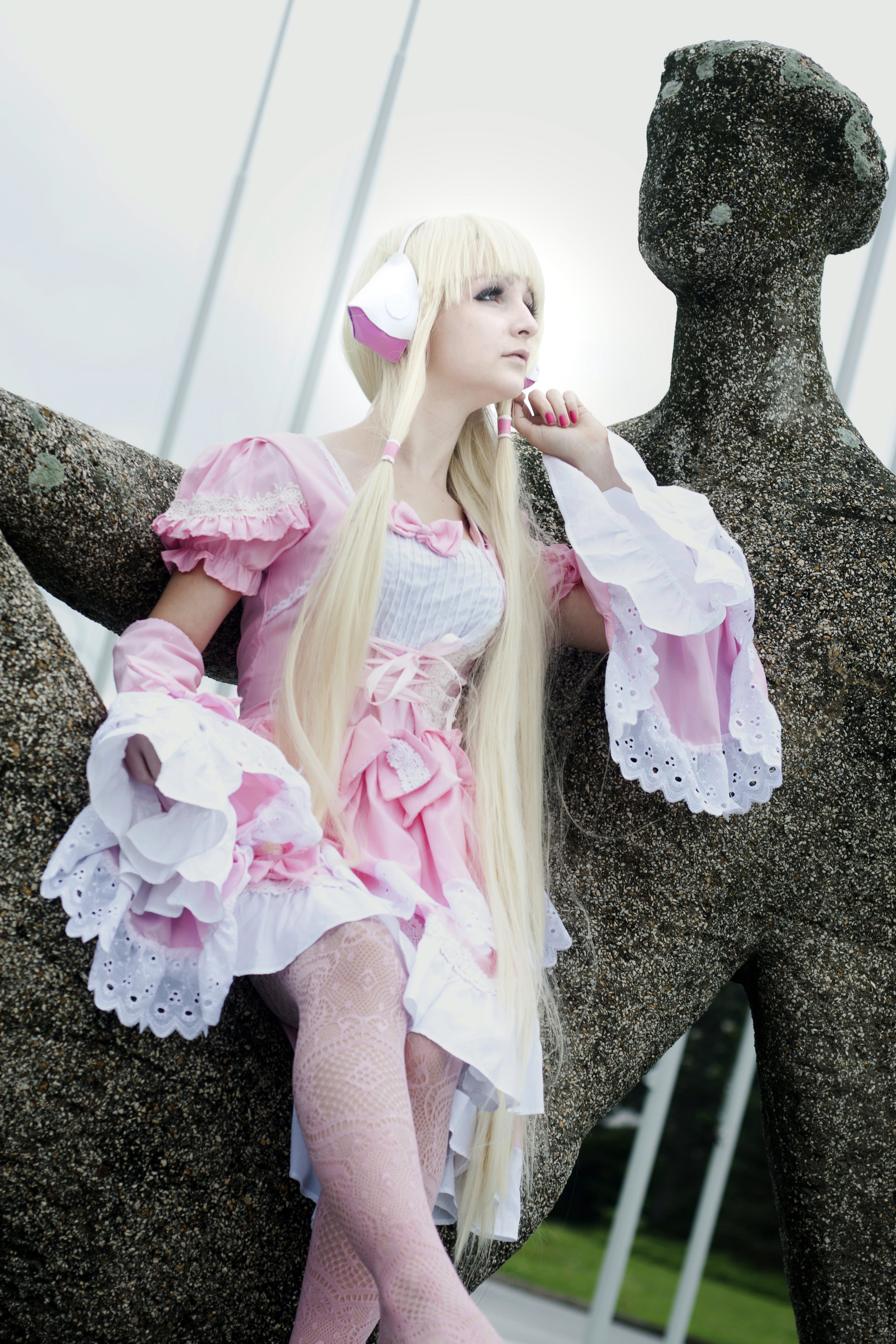
A Chi cosplayer

Chi's character is voiced by Rie Tanaka, and Michelle Ruff in its English counterpart. The anime and manga storylines are essentially the same, but they differ slightly. These differences include the events in the ending, other things such as describing Elda's memory loss, and her special program. In the anime for example, it is explained that Hibiya reset Elda's memories after her husband's death rather than Elda losing them when she took Freya's program in. Another difference is the special program that was placed into Elda in the anime, this program appears to have an alternative effect. If Chi finds the Person just for her, all persocoms would be granted the ability to feel emotion. The reason for this is since Ichiro Mihara was the creator of persocoms, he viewed them all as his children. His wish was that if Chi were able to find someone who loved her in return, all his children would be able to share in this happiness by being able to feel emotions the way humans do.

In the anime, an organization known only as "The Syndicate" is aware of Chi and her special programming. Under the impression that something terrible will happen if her program executes successfully, they send two persocoms, Zima and Dita, to destroy her. Towards the end of the series Chi tells Hideki of her love, asking if it is requited. Hideki responds with a yes, and they embrace briefly before Chi's program executes. Chi floats up to the roof of the apartment and begins to run her program. Hideki makes his way on to the roof to save her. Chi is able to complete her program but chooses not to. She retreats inside herself, and Freya takes control as Chitose Hibiya arrives on the rooftop.

Freya explains how she came to inhabit Chi's body. She reveals that she and Chi merely switched places inside the body, but Chi has shut herself away and Freya cannot contact her. Hideki asks why, and Freya explains that Chi discovered there were certain things that humans could do that she could not, leading her to believe that while Hideki would love her, it would make her existence unbearable. Hideki protests that it would not, but Freya tells him that Chi thought otherwise. She then tells Chitose that the time has come to destroy both of them, and she reluctantly agrees. Against Hideki's protestations, she deactivates Freya. Chi, however, has survived the deactivation and comes to the conclusion that while life with Hideki may seem painful because of her limitations, it is even more painful without him. She regains control of her body and completes her program, giving every persocom the ability to love then embraces Hideki.

=== In other media ===
Chi makes several appearances in Tsubasa: Reservoir Chronicle, and is voiced by in the anime by: Kaori Nazuka (Japanese version) and Trina Nishimura (English version). In this crossover series, she is created by Fai D. Flowright as a guardian of the pool where his brother's body, and eventually the sealed Ashura-ou are kept. Fai modeled Chi after his memories of his mother, and was created using one of Princess Sakura's feathers. Chi eventually disintegrates after the feather is removed and given back to Sakura. Another version of Chi appears in episode 32 of the anime where she is the queen of a world that is in a never-ending night. Chi's character is also cosplayed in the anime adaptation of Hanaukyo Maid Team: La Verite. While trying to sell manga at the "Comic manga market", Ikuyo Suzuki has the cast of characters cosplay and Mariel goes as Chi.

== Reception ==
Reviews of Chi's character have been mostly positive. Nanase Ohkawa of Clamp stated: "We got a lot of letters saying that Chii-chan is cute" THEM Anime Reviews critiqued Chi for being a main character but "not having a personality" in the series. Tony Chen from Anime News Network said that "The way Clamp executes the development of Chi's character, growing her from what is basically the mental equivalent of a five-year-old child to a much more intelligent and complex being, is not only clever but also very cute." On the website Screen Junkies, Chi is ranked number 3 of 10 of a "Top 10 anime girls" pick and number 6 of 10 for best anime couples (Chi and Hideki). In his book The Anime Machine: A Media Theory of Animation, Thomas Lamarre describes Chi as "lighter than air" and a "slight slender undefined" body and with not much potential for physical movement. Thomas also describes Chi as "bony" and skeletal" in a physiological way and compares her to a curled up cat when reclining. Chi is also a cosplayed character by fans at anime conventions and related events.

== See also ==
- Chobits
- List of Chobits characters
- Gynoid
