= List of Chobits chapters =

Cover of the first volume, as released by Kodansha in Japan on February 14, 2001

The eighty-eight chapters of the science-fiction manga series Chobits are written and illustrated by Clamp. Chobits appeared as a serial in the Japanese manga magazine Young Magazine from the 43rd issue for 2000 to the 48th issue for 2002. Kodansha collected the chapters in eight bound volumes from February 14, 2001, to November 29, 2002. The series centers on Hideki Motosuwa, who finds an abandoned persocom—a personal computer in human form—which he names "Chi" after the only word that she initially can speak. As he forms a relationship with Chi, he gradually learns about her mysterious past and the relationships between humans and persocoms.

Tokyopop licensed the series for English-language release in North America and published the eight volumes between April 23, 2002, and October 7, 2003. Tokyopop's license expired in August 2009; Dark Horse Comics has released Chobits in omnibus format, beginning on March 24, 2010, and concluding on September 29, 2010. Madman Entertainment distributed the series as published by Tokyopop in Australia and New Zealand. The series is published in Hong Kong in Traditional Chinese by Jonesky, in Singapore in Simplified Chinese by Chuang Yi, in South Korea by Daiwon C.I., in France by Pika Édition, in Spain by Norma Editorial, in Mexico by Grupo Editorial Vid, in Italy by Star Comics (which serialized it in Express), in Germany by Egmont Manga & Anime, in Poland by Japonica Polonica Fantastica, in Brazil by JBC, and in Sweden by Carlsen Verlag.

Chobits was adapted as an anime television series by Madhouse. The series was directed by Morio Asaka with music by K-Taro Takanami and character designs by Hisashi Abe. The series was broadcast in 26 episodes from 2 April 2002 to 24 September 2002 across Japan, East Asia, and Southeast Asia by the anime satellite television network, Animax and the terrestrial Tokyo Broadcasting System network. When it was released on DVD, a 27th episode was added as an OVA.

== Volume list ==
| No. | Original release date | Original ISBN | North American release date | North American ISBN |
|---|---|---|---|---|
| 1 | February 14, 2001 | 978-4-06-334383-0 | April 23, 2002 | 978-1-931514-92-7 |
Chapters 1–12
One day, while leaving his job, a repeat student named Hideki finds a persocom, an android used as a personal computer, in the trash. He carries her back to his apartment. He turns her on and she instantly regards him with adoration. Initially, she is only capable of saying "Chi", which becomes her name. After several attempts to access her data, he discovers that she possesses encrypted data and a program that allows her to learn, unlike other persocoms. He resolves to teach her and buys her a picture book entitled A City With No People. Later, he and Minoru Kokobunji discuss a picture of a Chobit, an artificial intelligence, that resembles Chi. Hideki's teacher, Takako Shimizu, later comes over to his apartment and insists on drinking.
| 2 | June 29, 2001 | 978-4-06-334427-1 | July 23, 2002 | 978-1-59182-005-5 |
Chapters 13–24
Shimizu leaves in the morning and Hideki's landlady, Chitose Hibiya, who had given Chi several outfits, takes Chi to her room. After giving Chi a dress she claims was hers, Hibiya tells her to find a person just for her. Meanwhile Hideki's coworker, Yumi Oumura, asks him on a date. After reading the next volume of A City With No People, Chi hears a voice calling her; inside her mind she sees a version of herself that echoes Hibiya's words. Seeing that Hideki is broke, Chi sets out to find a job, only to be tricked into doing a peep show. The owner asks Chi to touch her vagina and Chi refuses, since that is the location of her reset switch. At the same time, Hideki learns that his friend Shimbo and Shimizu are in a romantic relationship, and that Chi is in a peep show. Hideki rushes over to find that Chi has fled and the persocoms of the city have disconnected. Chi topples into his arms.
| 3 | September 26, 2001 | 978-4-06-334460-8 | October 22, 2002 | 978-1-59182-006-2 |
Chapters 25–36
Back in Hideki's apartment, Chi revives; from Shimbo's persocom, Hidki learns that Shimbo and Shimizu are eloping, despite that Shimizu is married. Shimbo explains that Shimizu's husband gradually forgot about her after getting a persocom. Later, Chi begins work at a pastry shop and Hideki realizes that A City With No People is about persocoms, after reading the next volumes. Chi returns and offers her salary to Hideki, who refuses and sends her to buy something for herself. At the bookstore, Chi buys porn for Hideki and the next two volumes of A City With No People. Via e-mail, Hideki receives a picture of Hibiya with a Chobit that resembles Chi. Meanwhile, two mysterious persocoms search for Chi.
| 4 | December 26, 2001 | 978-4-06-334483-7 | February 11, 2003 | 978-1-59182-007-9 |
Chapters 37–48
At the bakery, Chi and her other self discuss goodbyes and the other self reveals that A City With No People is about their past and present. Before leaving for work the next day, Hideki warns Chi to be careful; she looks sad, so Hideki hugs her. He then leaves and thinks about persocoms at work. Meanwhile, Chi goes to the bookstore where she reads the next A City With No People volume and is kidnapped. She awakes in an unfamiliar apartment and encounters her abductor and his persocom named Kotoko. Returning home, Hideki learns from Chi's manager that she was not at work today; upset, he searches for her and comes across the bookstore, where he too reads the next volume of A City With No People. Mr. Ueda later joins the search for Chi, and tells Hideki about his past marriage to a persocom.
| 5 | April 5, 2002 | 978-4-06-334527-8 | April 15, 2003 | 978-1-59182-153-3 |
Chapters 49–60
Chi's abductor returns and hooks her up to computers in his apartment. Chi changes personalities and ties him up with the cables. Meanwhile, Hideki receives a mysterious e-mail and with Minoru's help, he deducts that the file attached to the e-mail is a map of Chi's whereabouts. Searching with Shimbo, Hideki sees a light emit from an apartment. The persocoms disconnect again, reporting that they hear a familiar voice. Inside the apartment, Hideki discovers the bound kidnapper and Chi asks him what is most important to him, before toppling into his arms and changing back to her innocent self. Hideki and Shimbo discover that "Dragonfly" is actually Chi's kidnapper, Kojima, and borrow Kotoko from him. After paying for the book Chi accidentally took when she was abducted, Hideki takes Chi to work where her manager reveals that the reset switich of persocoms is normally in its ear; Hideki then ponders on whether Chi is a Chobit. Chi changes into Yumi's old work outfit, which causes Yumi to burst into tears and run off.
| 6 | July 24, 2002 | 978-4-06-334590-2 | June 10, 2003 | 978-1-59182-257-8 |
Chapters 61–72
At Hideki's apartment, Yumi explains that when she worked at the bakery, she eventually fell in love with the manager; discovering, that he had been previously married to a persocom, she felt that she was inferior to the persocom. The manager comes to Hideki's apartment and reveals that he loves her for herself. Later, while shopping, Chi buys a pair of matching rings after her other self explains that rings symbolize love. She gives one to Hideki and keeps the other. At Minoru's house, he, Kojima, and Hideki discuss Chi's unusual ability to access other persocoms while Minoru's persocom confesses to Chi that she cannot ever be a replacement for Minoru's deceased sister. Yuzuki later overhears Minoru and Kojima's conversation about hacking the National Data Bank for information on chobits, and she does so. The bank is revealed to be in Zima and his partner, Dita, destroys Yuzuki's programming to protect him.
| 7 | September 27, 2002 | 978-4-06-334599-5 | August 5, 2003 | 978-1-59182-258-5 |
Chapters 73–81
Upset, Minoru explains to Yuzuki that he loves her for herself and does not think of her as a replacement for his sister. Later, Chitose reveals to Hideki that Chi was originally named Elda and built for her as the daughter she could never have. Elda's older, identical sister Freya fell in love with her creator, Chitose's husband, the emotional stress of which destroyed her. As Freya lay dying, Elda took her memories, erasing her own in the process, and Freya vowed to help her find her soulmate. Elda asked her parents to leave her so that when she would make the same choice as Freya. Chitose reveals that she wrote A City With No People to help Chi with her search for her soulmate. Hideki runs off to find Chi, while Chi decides that Hideki is her soulmate and activates her unique programming.
| 8 | November 29, 2002 | 978-4-06-334632-9 | October 7, 2003 | 978-1-59182-409-1 |
Chapters 82–88
Hideki discovers that the water main under the city has broken and the city is experiencing a mysterious blackout. He finds Chi floating in the air and she confesses her love to him. He does the same, which causes Freya to take over Chi's body. Freya reveals that Chi is incapable of sexual intercourse since doing so would reset her, erasing her memories in the process. Hideki decides that this does not matter and will still stay with Chi. Freya then tells Hideki to take care of her sister and goes away. Chi awakens in his arms, happy to have finally found her soulmate. Zima and Dita later discuss Chi's unique ability to destroy the individual recognition programs on all persocoms, given to her to use if she failed in finding a soulmate.
