= Ichiro Mihara =

Ichiro Mihara may refer to:

- Ichiro Mihara, vice president of Arika
- Ichiro "Icchan" Mihara, recurring Clamp character in Angelic Layer and Chobits
