= List of Chobits episodes =

Cover of the DVD compilation released by Geneon Entertainment.

Chobits (ちょびっツ, Chobittsu) is an anime series, adapted from the manga of the same name by Clamp. The series was adapted by Madhouse and directed by Morio Asaka with music by K-Taro Takanami and character designs by Hisashi Abe. The opening theme is "Let Me Be With You" by Round Table featuring Nino. The ending themes are "Raison d'être" (Reason to Be) by Rie Tanaka (episodes 1–13), "Ningyo Hime" (ニンギョヒメ, lit. Mermaid Princess) by Rie Tanaka (episodes 14–25), and "Katakoto no Koi" (片言の恋, lit. Awkward Love) by Rie Tanaka and Tomokazu Sugita (episodes 26).

The series was broadcast in 26 episodes from 2 April 2002 to 24 September 2002 across Japan, East Asia, and Southeast Asia by the anime satellite television network, Animax and the terrestrial Tokyo Broadcasting System network. Elsewhere in the world, the series was rebroadcast in Korea by AniOne TV, in France by Europe 2 TV, in Spain by both Animax España and Buzz Channel, in Portugal on Animax Portugal, and in Poland by Hyper. It was later released in Japan across 8 DVDs. The original episodes 9 and 18 are "recap" episodes, summarizing previous events. These episodes were re-numbered for the DVD release as episodes 8.5 and 16.5, respectively, and removed from their original sequence by being published together on the final DVD. As a result, the series is 24 episodes long. In addition, there are two DVD-only OVAs: a 27th episode recapping the series (numbered episode 24.5) and a 6-minute special. The ending theme of the latter is "Book End Bossa" by Round Table featuring Nino.

The series was licensed in North America by Geneon, who released the series across 7 DVDs between 11 March 2003 and 9 March 2004 and as a complete boxset on 8 November 2005. In the UK the series was licensed by MVM Films and released on six discs between 21 March 2005 and 10 April 2006. A complete boxset was released on 5 March 2007. In Australian and New Zealand it was released by Madman Entertainment. It is also licensed in Taiwan by Proware Multimedia, in France and the Netherlands by Kazé, in Germany by ADV Films even though it's no longer licensed since the company's shutdown, and in Russia by MC Entertainment.

== Episodes ==
No.	Title	Directed by	Written by	Original air date
1	"Chi Awakens"; Transliteration: "Chii Mezameru" (Japanese: ちぃ 目覚める)	Morio Asaka	Nanase Ohkawa	2 April 2002
Hideki Motosuwa is an 18-year-old student living with the short end of a stick. He's short on money, has to go to prep school, and is still a virgin. Hideki dreams of getting into college and having a cute Persocom to surf the internet for pornography with. While he's out one night, he finds a Persocom in the garbage, activates her, and names her Chi, after her first word, which appears to be the only thing that she can say. After trying to hide her from Hiromu Shinbo, his neighbor (and his mini-Persocom Sumomo), and trying and failing to hide her from his landlady, Ms. Hibiya, he decides to keep her, much to her joy.
2	"Chi Goes Out"; Transliteration: "Chii Dekakeru" (Japanese: ちぃ 出かける)	Tatsuyuki Nagai	Jirō Kaneko	9 April 2002
Hideki wants to find out more about Chi, so he takes her to Shinbo's friend Minoru Kokubunji, who is a rich but very young expert on Persocoms. There, they find out that she has some sort of learning program, even though she has no OS (operating system). Minoru concludes that Hideki is able to teach her and that she will be able to grasp information that she is given. While leaving the house, Minoru tells Hideki not to fall in love with her if he does not want to cry later. Later, in his room, Hideki gives her the name "chi".
3	"Chi Learns"; Transliteration: "Chii Oboeru" (Japanese: ちぃ おぼえる)	Nobuharu Kamanaka	Tomoyasu Ōkubo	16 April 2002
Chi begins learning words from Hideki, who is running very low on money. He decides to get a job to pay for his living expenses. Unfortunately, all the jobs are taken, except for a position he stumbles upon by accident at Japanese pub called Yorokonde ("My Pleasure"), where he meets a high school girl named Yumi.
4	"Chi Goes on Errands"; Transliteration: "Chii Otsukai" (Japanese: ちぃ おつかい)	Kaoru Suzuki	Tsuyoshi Tamai	23 April 2002
Hideki comes to realizes that Chi doesn't have "pantsu" ("Underpants" in the dub). Since he's too embarrassed to get them himself, he lets Chi go to a lingerie store to buy them with the help of Sumomo's navigation system. After several mishaps and mistakes, Hideki finally plucks up the courage to run into the store and buy them himself and run back out.
5	"Chi Finds"; Transliteration: "Chii Mitsukeru" (Japanese: ちぃ 見つける)	Nanako Shimazaki	Tomoyasu Ōkubo	30 April 2002
Hideki is facing his first practice exam and goes to the book store to buy an English dictionary since he forgot his own at his parents' place. At the store, Chi finds a picture book called "A City with No People," which sparks Chi's curiosity. Hideki buys it for her rather than his dictionary, and Shinbo lends his to Hideki. While Shinbo is teaching Hideki how to use the dictionary, Chi finishes the picture book and something unusual happens.
6	"Chi Weakens"; Transliteration: "Chii Yowaru" (Japanese: ちぃ 弱る)	Ryō Miyata	Sumio Uetake	7 May 2002
Hideki begins to worry because Chi seems to be tired constantly. He talks to Shinbo about this, and learns that Persocoms need to be charged. Normally, prolonged exposure to sunlight is fine, but in this case, Chi needs to be plugged in. When Hideki returns, he finds that Chi is very close to losing all of her battery power, but he cannot recharge her because he hasn't paid his electricity bill. In a desperate attempt, he tries to take Chi to Yorokonde but gets horribly lost along the way.
7	"Chi Works"; Transliteration: "Chii Hataraku" (Japanese: ちぃ 働く)	Tomoki Kobayashi	Jukki Hanada	14 May 2002
Chi wants to find a job to so she can help Hideki pay for their expenses. But Chi, being Chi, manages to get an accidental job in a peep show, and Hideki must look for her.
8	"Chi Bewildered"; Transliteration: "Chii Tomadou" (Japanese: ちぃ とまどう)	Hideki Inoue	Akiko Horii	21 May 2002
During the events in the previous episode, Chi's defense mechanism activates and puts her in a trance-like state that results in her jumping from building to building and that seems to disable all of the other Persocoms in the area. Hideki goes looking for Chi. Seeing him takes her out of the state, and Hideki takes her home. Chii gets her first "real job" in a cake shop.
9	"Shinbo and Sumomo Chat"; Transliteration: "Shinbo・Sumomo Kataru" (Japanese: 新保・すもも 語る)	Hiroyuki Tanaka	Jukki Hanada	28 May 2002
Sumomo is running low on memory space, so she asks her owner, Shinbo, what he wants to erase. He starts at Sumomo's "congratulations on moving in" dance for Hideki, and then recalls several main events and funny incidents that have occurred in the series thus far. This episode serves mainly as a recap of the storyline.
10	"Chi Buys"; Transliteration: "Chii Kau" (Japanese: ちぃ 買う)	Makoto Fuchigami	Tomoyasu Ōkubo	4 June 2002
Chi decides to use her money to buy the sequel to the book "A City with No People" and a porno magazine for Hideki, who learns from Shinbo that Persocoms need bathing. Since he doesn't have money to buy bathing software for Chi, he has to teach Chi how to bathe. Hideki asks Minoru for help, and when they meet, Minoru shows him a picture that appears to be Chi. The picture came from an untraceable email. At the public baths, after some awkward, unsuccessful attempts to instruct Chi on how to bathe herself, Hideki eventually finds a way to avoid the task when he meets his landlady, who helps bathe Chi.
11	"Chi Meets"; Transliteration: "Chii Deau" (Japanese: ちぃ 出会う)	Mitsuo Hashimoto	Jukki Hanada	11 June 2002
Hideki gets a date with Yumi. While he's out, Chi reads the sequel of her book, which awakens a part of her memory. As a result, she meets a mysterious girl who looks exactly like her, named Freya, who seems to know everything about Chi's past that Chi does not.
12	"Chi Confirms"; Transliteration: "Chii Tashikameru" (Japanese: ちぃ 確かめる)	Kaoru Suzuki	Sumio Uetake	18 June 2002
Hideki is scared of a room in the apartment because of a horror story he heard at Minoru's house when he was asking about the internet through Minoru's custom-made Persocom Yuzuki. He becomes paranoid thinking about the story and, believing that his apartment building is haunted, has several self-induced hallucinations. The apartment number in the story is 104, as 4, or shi. "Shi" is the Japanese word for Four (四) and Death (死), and because of this, the number four is unlucky in Japan. According to the story, a woman who was hoping to rendezvous with her lover was killed in that room. Hideki and Chi along with Shinbo, Minoru and Yuzuki decide to investigate. At the end, Hideki and Chi discover that it is all a misunderstanding.
13	"Chi Plays"; Transliteration: "Chii Asobu" (Japanese: ちぃ 遊ぶ)	Ryō Miyata	Tsuyoshi Tamai	25 June 2002
Hideki gets a DVD player and an online game from Minoru. He, Chi, Sumomo and Shinbo play the game together. However, Chi is somehow not with them in the game, and Hideki searches around in-game to find her despite the fact that he has no experience in playing online games. While doing so, he accidentally finds himself confronting an undefeatable boss monster and is eventually rescued by Chi, although afterward Chi claims that she has no memory of the incident.
14	"Chi Goes to the Ocean"; Transliteration: "Chii Umi Iku" (Japanese: ちぃ 海いく)	Osamu Sekita	Akiko Horii	2 July 2002
Hideki, Shinbo, Chi, Ms. Hibiya, Yumi, and Ms. Shimizu (their prep school teacher) decide to go to Minoru's Beach House over the Spring Break. There, dolphins catch their eye, Chi jumps overboard, and in an attempt to rescue Chi, Hideki nearly drowns himself.
15	"Chi Entertains"; Transliteration: "Chii Motenasu" (Japanese: ちぃ もてなす)	Masahiko Ohta	Jukki Hanada	9 July 2002
Ms. Shimizu suddenly shows up at Hideki's apartment and spends the night. She doesn't say why, but she asks him if he prefers Persocoms over people. The next day, he finds out that Shinbo hasn't slept at all. But when Hideki tells him what had happened overnight, Shinbo freaks out. Later, Hideki is walking home when he sees Ms. Shimizu and Shinbo locked in a romantic embrace.
16	"Chi Doesn't Do Anything"; Transliteration: "Chii Nanimo Shinai" (Japanese: ちぃ 何もしない)	Nanako Shimazaki	Sumio Uetake	16 July 2002
Hideki wakes up with Sumomo in his bag. Then he finds out that Shinbo has run away with Ms. Shimizu and eloped. Bewildered, Hideki goes to Minoru's house and gets him to contact Shinbo via video call. Shinbo explains that Ms. Shimizu lost her trust in men when her husband bought a Persocom and became so enamoured with it he completely forgot about his wife.
17	"Chi Provides"; Transliteration: "Chii Makanau" (Japanese: ちぃ まかなう)	Hiroshi Kimura	Tsuyoshi Tamai	23 July 2002
Hideki has lost his wallet and cannot buy anything to eat. Chi wants to give him a meal to make him happy, so she uses her work paycheck to buy the food and make it herself. Her attempt results in the smoke alarm going off, and Miss Hibiya teaches her to cook a more edible meal.
18	"Minoru and Yuzuki Chat"; Transliteration: "Minoru・Yuzuki Kataru" (Japanese: 稔・柚姫 語る)	Hiroyuki Tanaka	Jukki Hanada	30 July 2002
Minoru and Yuzuki tried to find what Chi really is and search for clues about the creator of the Chobits picture. Yuzuki reviews with Minoru what they know about Chi, and the only thing they can conclude with the information they have is that Chi is not a normal Persocom. This episode is another recap of the events that have happened so far in the series.
19	"Chi Helps"; Transliteration: "Chii Tetsudau" (Japanese: ちぃ 手伝う)	Makoto Fuchigami	Akiko Horii	6 August 2002
Ms. Hibiya is cleaning the apartments, and Hideki and Chi offer to help her. When Hideki goes to clean the electronics room, Sumomo accidentally falls onto some wires and gets electrocuted. Ms Hibiya then reveals that she used to build Persocoms, and she repairs Sumomo.
20	"Chi Disappears"; Transliteration: "Chii Inaku Naru" (Japanese: ちぃ いなくなる)	Ryō Miyata	Sumio Uetake	13 August 2002
While Chi is on her way to work, she notices the third part of the book series "A City With No People" on the shelf of a bookstore. While she flips through the pages, she is grabbed from behind and is kidnapped. Hideki comes home from prep school and returns to find Chi missing.
21	"Chi Waits"; Transliteration: "Chii Matsu" (Japanese: ちぃ 待つ)	Mitsuyuki Masuhara	Jukki Hanada	20 August 2002
Chi is still in the hands of her abductor as Hideki searches for her. After he talks to Mr. Ueda about Chi missing work, they decide to search for Chi together, and Mr. Ueda talks about his marriage to his last Persocom.
22	"Chi Wants"; Transliteration: "Chii Motomeru" (Japanese: ちぃ 求める)	Masahiko Ohta	Sumio Uetake	27 August 2002
Chi is still missing, and Hideki is enlisting as much help as he can to find her. A strange e-mail image gets sent to him and Shinbo from an untraceable email address. It turns out that this is a map for the house of Chi's abductor, Dragonfly, and he is carrying out research to find out what Chi is.
23	"Chi Answers"; Transliteration: "Chii Kotaeru" (Japanese: ちぃ 答える)	Kazuhiro Ozawa; Mitsuo Hashimoto	Tomoyasu Ōkubo	3 September 2002
Hideki and Chi help Shinbo move out of the apartment to live with Ms. Shimizu (who is now married to him). Then they arrive at Minoru's house, where he is trying to find information on Chobits. Minoru, who has not been sleeping enough, passes out, and Yuzuki (Minoru's custom-made Persocom) decides to try to hack the Chobits database herself.
24	"Chi Wears And Takes Off"; Transliteration: "Chii Kite Nugu" (Japanese: ちぃ 着てぬぐ)	Nanako Shimazaki	Akiko Horii	10 September 2002
Hideki takes Chi to work. There, Chi changes into the wrong uniform. Ueda tells her it's the wrong one, but before she goes to change, Yumi sees her wearing it from outside the shop and runs away crying. As it turns out, Yumi used to work at the store, and that had been her uniform. When Yumi was working for Mr. Ueda, the two had started falling in love, but when Yumi learned about Mr. Ueda's previous marriage to a Persocom, she concluded that he believed Persocoms to be superior to humans, so she quit her job at his bakery and broke off the relationship.
25	"Chi Decides"; Transliteration: "Chii Kimeru" (Japanese: ちぃ 決める)	Ryō Miyata	Jukki Hanada	17 September 2002
Ms. Hibiya secretly leaves Chi the fourth book in the "A City With No People" series. Hideki meets with Shinbo and shares his feelings for Chi. Ms. Hibiya reveals to Hideki that her husband was the one to create Chi and the other mysterious girl, Freya. She tells Hideki that Chi used to be called Elda and, like her sister, was created to be loved and fall in love with others. Chi then tells Hideki that she loves him.
26	"The Person Only For Chi"; Transliteration: "Chii Dake no Hito" (Japanese: ちぃ だけの人)	Morio Asaka	Tsuyoshi Tamai	24 September 2002
Following the events from the previous episode, Hideki responds to Chi he also loves her. At this point, something triggers in Chi, and she flies out of the apartment window and onto the roof of the building. Zima and Dita, two advanced Persocoms who had been observing from a distance, wait nearby intending to stop Chi from launching her supposed hidden program that they fear will destroy all Persocoms. Finding Hideki and Chi on the roof, Hibiya reveals that she is Chi's mother. She tells Hideki that Chi is a Chobit, and that Freya, the "familiar voice" other Persocoms had been hearing during Chi's trances, was Chi's sister who had died. Chi has chosen Hideki as her "one and only," and Freya has taken control from within Chi. At Freya's request, Hibiya issues the command to shut them down and delete their programming, heedless of Hideki's protests. Hideki then tells Chi/Freya that he loved her and tells her the meaning of happiness - to be with those you love. Freya accepts that Chi has done the thing Freya couldn't do while alive: to find her "one and only." Chi finishes running the program. Freya subsides and disappears, leaving Hideki and Chi to live happily ever after.

== Unaired episodes (DVD/Blu-Ray exclusives) ==
No.	Title	Directed by	Written by	Original release date
27	"Hibiya and Kotoko Chat"; Transliteration: "Hibiya・Kotoko Kataru" (Japanese: 日比谷・琴子 語る)	Hiroyuki Tanaka	Jukki Hanada	—
This episode is another recap of the events that have happened in the series, framed by Ms. Hibiya preparing a dinner party for everyone in anticipation of hearing the results of Hideki's college entrance exams.
OVA	"Chibits: Sumomo and Kotoko Deliver"; Transliteration: "Chiibittsu: Sumomo・Kotoko Todokeru" (Japanese: ちびっツ すもも・琴子 届ける)	Morio Asaka	Jukki Hanada	—
Hideki is on his way to college when Chi discovers that he has forgotten his wallet. After she leaves the apartment, Sumomo and Kotoko find out that Chi has forgotten to wear underwear. They run after Chi to deliver the underwear to her, which results in a comical ending.
