= List of Angelic Layer characters =

This is a character guide to the manga and anime series Angelic Layer.

== Main characters ==
=== Misaki Suzuhara ===
- Angel Entry Phrase: "Angel Wings! Please guide me and Hikaru!"
- Voiced by: Atsuko Enomoto (Japanese); Jessica Boone (English)
Misaki Suzuhara (鈴原 みさき, Suzuhara Misaki) The main protagonist. Misaki is a timid, sweet-tempered, and kind 12-year-old girl who has just moved to Tokyo to live with her aunt. In the manga she is more overreactive and easily excited. She had been living with her grandparents in Wakayama while she went to elementary school, but saved her money so she could afford to go to middle school in Tokyo. She worries about the fact that she is small and unathletic, and is sometimes mistaken for an elementary school student. She sees Angelic Layer as a way to prove that there is nothing wrong with being small. She started playing Angelic Layer after seeing the white angel Athena on a video screen outside of Tokyo Station (she was unaware that she was seeing her own mother's angel). Her angel is Hikaru, and she is known as the "Miracle Rookie". She is nicknamed Misakichi (みさきち) by her friend Tamayo.
In volume 7 of the manga Chobits, she is seen with Minoru and two other visitors at the hospital visiting Kaede.

=== Ichiro "Icchan" Mihara ===
- Voiced by: Masaya Onosaka (Japanese); Andy McAvin (English)
Ichiro Mihara (三原 一郎, Mihara Ichirō) nicknames himself Icchan (いっちゃん) to hide his true identity from Misaki. He is 28 years old and often acts eccentric, spontaneous, and immature for his age. He often jumps out of random places, shouting "Icchan go BOOM!", to scare Misaki and Ogata. He is ingenious and dead serious when it comes to Angelic Layer. In the manga, Icchan is the president of the Piffle Company, creators of the Angelic Layer toys. In the anime, Icchan is the "father" and creator of Angelic Layer, having developed the game over seven years with the help of Shuko Suzuhara. Icchan was an employee at a hospital that was trying to treat Shuko's neurological condition. They were developing the angels as part of their research into creating prosthetic limbs which could be controlled by brain waves. When the research funding was cut off, Icchan and Shuko created Angelic Layer in order to help fund further research.
According to volumes 7 and 8 of the Chobits manga, it is heavily implied that Icchan is the late husband of Chitose Hibiya and the creator of the persocoms. Since he and Hibiya could not have children, he made two special persocoms, the Chobits, to be their children. They were named Freya and Elda (later known as Chi). The Chobits were created using information gathered from the research performed for the Angelic Layer project. In the Chobits anime, Icchan only appears in one scene but is not explicitly named.
In a letter on Clamp's website about Mugen no Yami - echo of the past, Clamp mentioned their "long time friend Ichirou Mihara", who is the vice president of the video-game company Arika, so this is most likely the source of the character's name.

=== Hatoko Kobayashi ===
- Angel Entry Phrase: "Exceed the speed of light and sound, Suzuka!"
- Voiced by: Yuri Shiratori (Japanese); Sasha Paysinger (English)
Hatoko Kobayashi (小林 鳩子, Kobayashi Hatoko) is a 5-year-old known in the Angelic Layer world as the "Miracle Kindergartner". She is Misaki's best friend and Angelic Layer mentor. Even at a very young age, she is intelligent, mature, and hard-working. She is an expert at Angelic Layer, often winning her games in mere seconds. She wins all ten of her games at the Tokyo prefecture games, and is the defending champion of the Kantō regional games. She is fiercely competitive, and often works to increase her angel's speed and power. She likes to poke fun at her brother Kotaro for his apparent ineptness when it comes to his crush on Misaki. Hatoko treats Misaki like her student rather than her nee-chan (sister). Hatoko's angel is Suzuka.

=== Kotaro Kobayashi ===
- Voiced by: Jun Fukuyama (Japanese); Kevin Corn (English)
Kotaro Kobayashi (小林 虎太郎, Kobayashi Kōtarō) is a 13-year-old middle school classmate of Misaki, whom he has a crush on, and Hatoko's elder brother. He is always being assaulted by Tamayo and her various martial arts techniques, of which he has been a victim since he was four years old. He becomes jealous of Ohjiro's advances towards Misaki, going so far as to try to attempt to play a quasi-match of Angelic Layer against Ohjiro, despite the fact that he had never played it before. His family owns a karate dojo. Kotaro has practiced karate himself, showing Misaki some of his knowledge in hopes that Misaki can use it to help Hikaru win. He resembles Hiromu Shinbo from Chobits.
- In the anime, he ends up with Tamayo after she tells him how she feels. In the manga, he falls in love with Misaki and they both date.

=== Tamayo Kizaki ===
- Voiced by: Satsuki Yukino (Japanese); Monica Rial (English)
Tamayo Kizaki (木崎 珠代, Kizaki Tamayo) is 13 years old, and is a friend and classmate of Misaki. She nicknames Misaki "Misakichi" and is rather eccentric. One of her favorite activities is practicing her martial arts techniques on her unwilling friend, Kotaro. She always cheers for Misaki at Angelic Layer matches and defends her against those who question her ability. In the anime, it is revealed that Tamayo has always held intimate feelings for Kotaro, while in the manga, she only sees him as a close friend. She offers to be Misaki's "second" in her national game match against the Angelic Layer Company's angel when Hatoko is ill. Misaki accepts Ohjiro's offer instead.
- The martial arts Tamayo has mastered are wrestling, karate, K-1, kenpō, boxing, judo, capoeira, and taekwondo.
- In the anime she ends up with Kotaro after telling him how she feels. In the manga, Tamayo falls in love with Ohjiro Mihara.

=== Ohjiro Mihara ===
- Voiced by: Sōichirō Hoshi (Japanese); Chris Patton (English)
Ohjiro Mihara (三原 王二郎, Mihara Ōjirō) is 15 years old and is Icchan's younger step-brother. He has been involved with Angelic Layer for many years, in large part because it was what brought him and Icchan together after their parents married. Ohjiro competes in Kobe, and was the champion of the Kansai Regional games, as well as being the runner-up in the national tournament for two consecutive years.In the manga he is reassuringly asking what color are Misaki panties then running away. He has a desperate desire to defeat Shuko Suzuhara's angel, Athena, to get over a childhood crush he had on her. His angel is Wizard. In the anime, he falls in love with Misaki.

=== Shoko Asami ===
- Voiced by: Kotono Mitsuishi (Japanese); Kelly Manison (English)
Shoko Asami (浅見 祥子, Asami Shōko) is Misaki's aunt and Shuko's younger sister. She is 26 years old. Her hairstyle bears a resemblance to that of Takako Shimizu in Chobits. She demands that Misaki and her friends call her "Miss Shoko" instead of "aunt" ("obasan" in Japanese) because she is still "an attractive young newscaster." She often covers Angelic Layer events for the local news station, where she works. Misaki lives with Shoko when she moves to Tokyo.

=== Shuko Suzuhara ===
- Angel Entry Phrase: "Athena's wings! Open up the future!"
- Voiced by: Kikuko Inoue (Japanese); Christine M. Auten (English)
Shuko Suzuhara (鈴原 萩子, Suzuhara Shūko) is Misaki's mother and Shoko's elder sister. She is 31 years old. She works for the company behind Angelic Layer and is one of its top players. Shuko, or "Shu" as she is called when playing Angelic Layer, is the undisputed champion with her angel Athena, having won the past three national championships. Athena faces Hikaru at the climax of the series.
In the manga, it is revealed that Shuko has extreme anthropophobia / social anxiety disorder about socializing with those she loves. However, the anime has a different characterization of Shuko. She left Misaki at the age of five to be taken care of by her grandparents under the guise of work, when in reality she was going to Tokyo to search for a cure her neurological disease that leaves her reliant to a wheelchair. This condition inhibits nerve signals from reaching to or from her legs. Ichiro Mihara was a doctor attempting to work with her to find a cure when the two started Angelic Layer as a way to do research and raise funds. Over the past seven years, she has avoided meeting Misaki, as she is afraid of what Misaki would think of her.

== Supporting characters ==
Sai Jounouchi (城乃内 最, Jōnouchi Sai)

- Angel Entry Phrase: Let the silver snow fall! Dance, Shirahime!
- Voiced by: Houko Kuwashima (Japanese); Tiffany Grant (English)
16-year-old Sai Jounouchi, known as the "Ice Machine," started playing Angelic Layer at the request of her terminally ill sister, Rin. Rin designed what the angel would look like, but died before Sai could create her. Sai states that her reason for playing Angelic Layer is "to become strong." Sai is from Kanagawa Prefecture and was the runner-up in the Kantō Regional games the past year. She is friends with Kaede, who went to the same middle school as Sai. Her angel is Shirahime.

Kaede Saito (斉藤 楓, Saitō Kaede)

- Angel Entry Phrase: Blanche! Everything is at your will!
- Voiced by: Ayako Kawasumi (Japanese); Tiffany Terrell (English)
Kaede is a 15-year-old quiet and wise girl with glasses from Kanagawa. She is friends with Sai Jounouchi. Her parents are divorced, and she lives with her father. She received an angel egg as a gift from someone in her father's company. Her personality does not appear to be one suited for Angelic Layer, as her father comments that he never believed that he would see Kaede compete in a fighting game. Despite this, she is adept at Angelic Layer. She treats her angel, Blanche, as her own daughter. She is known as the 'girl with a healing smile'. It is revealed in Chobits that she is Minoru Kokubunji's sister, and that she has died in the few years since Angelic Layer.

Ringo Seto (瀬戸 林子, Seto Ringo)

- Angel Entry Phrase: Start dancing, Lanka!
- Voiced by: Kana Ueda (Japanese); Mariela Ortiz (English)
Ringo is a 14-year-old pop idol from Tochigi who plays Angelic Layer, over the objections of her manager. In order to become strong and beat Hikaru, she studies Hikaru's past battles, notably against Suzuka, because she didn't lose quickly. Ringo likes living freely, and often escapes from her manager to get out of doing work. Ringo encouraged Misaki between matches. Ringo's angel is Lanka.

Madoka Fujisaki (藤崎 円香, Fujisaki Madoka)¹

- Angel Entry Phrase: Hit! Slash! Break! Mao's fist is my fist!
- Voiced by: Tomoko Kawakami (Japanese); Shelley Calene-Black (English)¹
Madoka is a strong competitor in the Kantō Regional games who fights against Suzuka and Hikaru, losing to both. Madoka is a Kung Fu artist, using martial arts as her angel's chief fighting tactics. She has a strong desire to defeat Hatoko Kobayashi's angel, Suzuka, to recover her family's "lost pride". While watching Hikaru's fight against another contestant, she and her sister say to Kaede Saito and Sai Jonouchi that she will not lose to anyone until after Suzuka is defeated. Arisu and Madoka sabotage Hikaru with a transmitter that will block Misaki's thoughts from reaching her doll, but are caught by Ohjiro Mihara. After losing, Madoka obtains a new outlook on why people play Angelic Layer, realizing that it was made to be fun for any person, to the slight annoyance of her sister. Madoka's angels are created by her younger sister, Arisu.

Arisu Fujisaki (藤崎 有栖, Fujisaki Arisu)²

- Angel Entry Phrase: Unknown
- Voiced by: Chiemi Chiba (Japanese); Mandy Clark (English)²
Arisu is a talented angel builder who aids her sister in creating angels. She follows in her sister's steps as a talented Kung Fu artist, and creates strong and agile angels. Arisu does not make angels for herself. Arisu designed Mao and Unpyo to be stronger than Suzuka, but Unpyo loses to Suzuka in record time, which mortifies her and her sister. After sabotaging Hikaru with a transmitter, Arisu is caught by Ohjiro Mihara. She is told that Angelic Layer is meant to show true talent and that anyone can be brilliant; she is forced to give up cheating to win. She is very sensitive about the angels she builds, and accuses her sister of not liking the angels she made after their loss to Hikaru. Arisu creates a balance-oriented angel called Arisu for herself near the end of the anime, and vows to beat Hikaru in a friendly battle. In the last episode, Arisu is shown fighting the angel Queen with Alice. She has a crush on Ohjiro Mihara, calling him "Ohijiro-sama", and asking for his autograph. She later decides she hates him after losing against Hikaru and Misaki. Arisu's name is translated in the Japanese anime credits as "Alice".

Masaharu Ogata (尾形 雅治, Ogata Masaharu)

- Voiced by: Tomokazu Seki (Japanese); Mark X. Laskowski (English)
Masaharu Ogata (age 24) is one of Icchan's subordinates in the Angelic Layer control room and lab. Icchan often ensnares Ogata into situations that result in Ogata getting "penalized." These penalties involve a range of embarrassing or terrible things, such as having a live octopus being stuck down his pants or being made to eat spaghetti through his nose. Icchan named an ugly angel after him as a penalty.

Hiromi Fujimori (藤森 ひろみ, Fujimori Hiromi)

- Voiced by: Yui Horie (Japanese); Allison L. Sumrall (English)

Fujimori is a coworker of Masaharu Ogata at the Piffle Princess.

Yuko Inada (稲田 夕子, Inada Yūko)

- Voiced by: Hiromi Nishikawa (Japanese); Kaytha Coker (English)

Yuko Inada works for Piffle Princess and is a good friend of Shuuko.

Shuji Inada (稲田 修二, Inada Shūji)

- Voiced by: Yoshiyuki Kono (Japanese); Jay Hickman (English)

Shuji Inada is Yuko's husband who also works for Piffle Princess.

Angelic Layer Host (司会者, Shikaisha)

- Voiced by: Yoshiyuki Kono (Japanese); Vic Mignogna (English)

The announcer for many of the major Angelic Layer competitions.

Kyoko (京子, Kyōko)

- Voiced by: Chieko Atarashi (Japanese); Luci Christian (English)

Asuka Kitamura (北村 飛鳥, Kitamura Asuka)

- Voiced by: Mamiko Noto

Yuko Hikawa (氷川 優子, Hikawa Yūko)

- Voiced by: Sayaka Ohara

Tomoko Yamada (山田 知子, Yamada Tomoko)

- Voiced by: Mayumi Asano (Japanese); Kaytha Coker (English)

Maria Shibata (柴田 まりあ, Shibata Maria)

- Voiced by: Kazusa Murai (Japanese); Hilary Haag (English)

Ryo Misaki (岬 了, Misaki Ryō)

- Voiced by: Kappei Yamaguchi (Japanese); Kira Vincent-Davis (English)

Rin Jounouchi (城乃内 鈴, Jōnouchi Rin)

- Voiced by: Sayuri Yoshida (Japanese); Allison Sumrall (English)

Chitose Tanaka (田中 千歳, Tanaka Chitose)

- Voiced by: Tomoko Miura (Japanese); Kim Prause (English)

Tsubasa "The Blonde Gale" McEnzie (つばさ・マッケンジー, Tsubasa Makkenjī)

- Voiced by: Rio Natsuki (Japanese); Shelley Calene-Black (English)

== Angels ==
Hikaru (ヒカル, Hikaru) – Deus: Misaki Suzuhara

Though small and lightweight compared to most angels, Hikaru possesses very strong attacks, most which are speed-based. Her small stature makes her aerodynamic, quick, and agile. She was created by Misaki to show others, through Angelic Layer, that there is nothing wrong with being small. Her appearance is a bit tomboyish, since Misaki had accidentally cut her hair short. She has a less mature physique than other angels. Hikaru appears as a crossover character in Chapter 144 of Clamp's manga Tsubasa: Reservoir Chronicle. Hikaru's name means 'glowing' or 'shining' in Japanese. In the manga, Misaki bases Hikaru's appearance off of Hikaru Shidou from Magic Knight Rayearth.

Suzuka (鈴鹿, Suzuka) – Deus: Hatoko Kobayashi

Nicknamed "The Speed of Light," Suzuka often defeats her opponents with her speed. Created by 5-year-old Hatoko, Suzuka resembles a beautiful and strong ninja, and her 'Rolling Thunder' attack can defeat other angels within seconds. Her strength has led her to compete in the heated National Tournament along with Hikaru. Suzuka's name derives from the fact that she has two suzus on her bow and one hanging from her hair.

Shirahime (白姫, Shirahime; lit. 'White Princess') – Deus: Sai Jounouchi

Nicknamed "The White Princess," Shirahime is a heavyweight angel who wears a white kimono. Shirahime's style of fighting is graceful and powerful, and she defeats her opponents with beauty and strength. Shirahime finished second in the Kantō regional games for two consecutive years. She fights against Suzuka and defeats her, and against Athena and Hikaru she loses. She is capable of reaching "Hypermode", like Blanche.

Blanche (ブランシェ, Buranshe) – Deus: Kaede Saitou

Nicknamed "The White Angel," Blanche is a powerful angel dressed as a nurse who is so fast that she has only been touched by four other angels. When in a tough fight, Blanche will use a technique called "Hypermode", which is a result of a glitch present in the first angels. Blanche is a contestant in the Kantō regional games. Her name can also be written Branche with the romaji "r" sounding like an "l". "Blanche" is French for white. In Tsubasa Blanche appears as a set of triplets in charge of functions at City Hall in Outo.

Ranga (ランガ, Ranga) – Deus: Ringo Seto

Ranga uses a technique called "the Dance of Death", which uses wind to attack opponents from a distance. Ranga is a contestant in the Kantō regional games. She wears Arabic clothes and resembles Tatra from Magic Knight Rayearth and Sumomo from Chobits. In the end of the anime, Ringo is wearing a cosplay of Ranga. In the manga, her name is Lanka.

Wizard (ウィザード, Wizādo) – Deus: Ohjiro Mihara

Wizard is the Kansai Regional champion, and was the runner up in the National Games for two consecutive years. Wizard uses a technique called "Magic Guard" to block his opponent's attacks with an electric shield that uses static electricity. Misaki neutralized the shield by using one of Hikaru's cables as an earth contact to the layer. Wizard is one of the few male angels in the Layer.

Athena (アテナ, Atena) – Deus: Shuko Suzuhara

Athena has won the National Games championship in all three years of its existence, and is the undisputed champion of Angelic Layer. She can create powerballs, called Astral Emission, and fly with wings. During their fight, Hikaru learned to do this.

Mao (猫, Mao) – Deus: Madoka Fujisaki

The newest angel created by Madoka's sister Arisu. Mao is a contestant in the Kantō regional games. She is designed after a cat, complete with ears and a tail. Mao is Chinese for "cat".

Shadow Panther – Deus: unknown

The first angel that Hikaru fights and defeats.

Queen – Deus: Kyoko

An angel which uses illegal electric whips in unofficial games to easily defeat inexperienced players. She fights and loses to Hikaru in her second Angelic Layer match. In the last episode, Queen is seen fighting Arisu Fujisaki's angel, Alice.

Colossus – Deus: Asuka Kitamura

An angel which participates in the Tokyo Prefecture games, losing to Eileen, and later to Hikaru.

Nightingale – Deus: Yoko

An angel with experience in the Kantō regional games who is competing in the Tokyo prefecture games. She is defeated by Suzuka in five seconds. Nightingale is defeated by Hikaru in the Tokyo prefecture games.

Katalina – Deus: Yuko Hikawa

Katalina fights by "skating" on the layer, and uses her skates to attack while spinning. She loses to Hikaru in the first round of the Tokyo prefecture games.

Vasquez – Deus: Tomoko Yamada

A powerful angel who lures her opponents into surprise attacks. She is defeated by Hikaru in the second round of the Tokyo prefecture games.

Tsubaki – Deus: Maria Shibata

An angel defeated by Hikaru in the final round of the Tokyo prefecture games.

Ace, Mark II, & Tri – Deus: Ryo Misaki

Ryo uses these three angels in a best-of-three match against Misaki in an attempt to show that girls cannot beat boys at Angelic Layer.

Misaki-chi – Deus: Ryo Misaki

Ryo created this angel after his loss to Misaki and Hikaru.

Natasha – Deus: unknown

Champion of the Chiba prefecture games. She is defeated by Suzuka in the first round of the Kantō regional games.

Yusari – Deus: unknown

This angel loses to Blanche in the Kantō regional games.

Eagle – Deus: Tsubasa "The Blond Gale" McEnzie

An angel who competed in the Kyūshū Regional games. She competes against Shirahime in the Angelic Layer National Games. She has the ability to glide through the air using wings, and uses this tactic against Shirahime, although it was not seen during the Kyūshū regionals.

Elain – Deus: Chitose Tanaka

The "Northern Aurora", an angel from Hokkaidō, fights Hikaru in the first round of the Angelic Layer National Games. She uses a technique called the "Hexagon Reversion" to immobilize her opponents in mid-air. Along with the lightning storm during Hikaru and Elain's fight, this technique almost makes the layer disappear. Elain has an advantage: she is a larger angel with long arms.

New Type SI-174 – Deus: Shuji Inada

An angel competing in the National Games representing the Angelic Layer company. SI-174 is a new model of angel which is capable of quicker and more efficient movements. The SI-174 fights Hikaru in the second round of the National Games.

Unpyo – Deus: Madoka Fujisaki

The previous angel created by Madoka's sister Arisu. She lost to Suzuka in record time in the previous tournament.

Alice (Arisu/Arizu in the manga) – Deus: Arisu Fujisaki

An angel developed by Arisu for herself, in contrast to those she made for her sister. Her Deus, after seeing Mao lose to Hikaru, competed in other district competitions, and ended up as a finalist for the National Games as an opponent to Hikaru. Alice is a balance-oriented angel, which allows her to stay upright on an icy layer.

Eileen – Deus: Mika Yamamoto

An angel which participates in the Tokyo Prefecture games, winning against Colossus.

TJ – Deus: Megumi

An angel which participates in the Tokyo Prefecture games, losing to Vasquez, and later to Hikaru.

Fina – Deus: unknown

This angel loses to Hikaru in the Kantō regional games.

Eadule – Deus: unknown

This angel loses to Shirahime in the Kantō regional games.
