= Michelle Ruff =

American voice actress

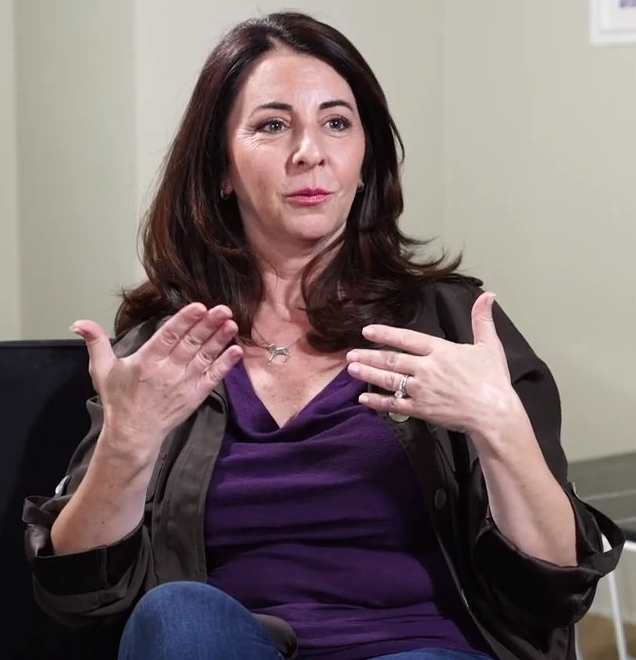
- Ruff in 2019
- Born: Michelle Suzanne Ruff; Detroit, Michigan, U.S.
- Other names: Georgette Rose; Sophie Roberts
- Education: Michigan State University
- Occupation: Voice actress
- Years active: 1997–present
- Agent: The Osbrink Agency
- Notable credits: Bleach; Chobits; Gurren Lagann; Lupin III; The Melancholy of Haruhi Suzumiya; Street Fighter; Sonic the Hedgehog; Sailor Moon
- Spouse: Eddie Correa (m. 2017)
- Website: michelleruff.com

Michelle Suzanne Ruff is an American voice actress known for her work in anime and video games. In her early voice acting career, she used her mother's name, Georgette Rose, as a pseudonym. Some of her roles include Rukia Kuchiki in Bleach, Luna in Sailor Moon, Zoe in Digimon Frontier, Yuki Nagato in The Melancholy of Haruhi Suzumiya, Yoko Littner in Gurren Lagann, Fujiko Mine in Lupin the Third, Chi in Chobits, Aoi Sakuraba in Ai Yori Aoshi, Elie in Rave Master, Nat in The Promised Neverland, and Sinon in Sword Art Online. In video games, she is the voice of Jill Valentine in the Resident Evil series, Yukari Takeba and Sadayo Kawakami in the Persona series, Katherine McBride in Catherine and its definitive edition Catherine: Full Body, Cream the Rabbit in the Sonic the Hedgehog series and Crimson Viper in the Street Fighter series.

== Career ==
Ruff grew up in Detroit, Michigan and graduated from Michigan State University. While she was there, she worked at a talent agency and attended a radio audition, which marked her first venture into the voiceover business. In Chicago, she studied with Second City, Players Workshop and Improv Olympic.

After moving to Los Angeles, she worked with some directors on looping and voice work for films and TV shows. In an Anime Dream interview, Ruff credits Richard Epcar, Steve Kramer and Michael Sorich for training her to dub anime. In the Digimon series, she was referred by director Mary Elizabeth McGlynn to audition for Lopmon and Antylamon in Digimon Tamers, and in Digimon Frontier, she landed the lead role of Zoe Orimoto. Ruff said that it was her first show that made it to TV, and a show that let her "work my acting muscle". She played tomboy-ish characters Miyao in Carried by the Wind: Tsukikage Ran and Kiki Rosita in Mobile Suit Gundam: The 08th MS Team.

In 2007, Ruff received two nominations for the American Anime Awards, one for Best Actress for her work in Bleach and Lupin the 3rd, and one for Best Actress in a Comedy for Lupin the 3rd, but lost to Mary Elizabeth McGlynn and Debi Derryberry, respectively. In 2009, the Society for the Promotion of Japanese Animation gave her an SPJA Industry Award for Best Voice Actress (English) for her work as Rukia Kuchiki in the Bleach movie Memories of Nobody.

== Personal life ==
Ruff is married to ADR Engineer Eddie Correa.

== Filmography ==
=== Anime ===
List of dubbing performances in anime
Year	Title	Role	Notes	Source
1997	Speed Racer X	Speed's Mom, Newscaster		Press
1999	Ninja Cadets	Yume		
1999	Jungle de Ikou!	Nami		
2000	Dual! Parallel Trouble Adventure	Mitsuki Sanada	As Georgette Rose	
2000	The Legend of Black Heaven	Yoshiko Tanaka	As Georgette Rose	
2000	Trigun	Lina		
2001	Mobile Suit Gundam: The 08th MS Team	Kiki Rosita		Press
2001	Hand Maid May	Kasumi Tani	As Georgette Rose	
2001	Metal Fighter Miku	Miku, Nana		
2001	Gate Keepers	Kaoru Konoe		
2001	Saint Tail	Ryoko		
2001	Zenki	Chiaki Enno		
2001–2002	Digimon Tamers	Antylamon, Lopmon		
2002	Great Teacher Onizuka	Urumi Kanzaki		
2002	Vandread	Belvedere Coco		
2002	Mahoromatic	Miyuki Sakura		
2002	Digimon Frontier	Zoe Orimoto, Kazemon, Zephyrmon, Lopmon		
2002	Carried by the Wind: Tsukikage Ran	Miyao		Press
2002	Samurai Girl: Real Bout High School	Hitomi Yuuki		
2002	X	Kotori Monou	TV series	
2002	X (Episode 0)	Kotori Monou	OVA	
2003	Lupin the Third Part II	Fujiko Mine	Pioneer/Geneon dub	
2003–2004	Ai Yori Aoshi series	Aoi Sakuraba		
2003	Chobits	Chi	As Georgette Rose	
2003	.hack//Liminality	Mai Minase		
2003	Omishi Magical Theater: Risky Safety	Safety / Mrs. Adachi		
2003	Witch Hunter Robin	Yurika Doujima		
2003	IGPX	Suzaku	Microseries	
2003	A Little Snow Fairy Sugar	Saga Bergman		
2003	Love Hina	Nyamo Namo		
2003	Please Teacher!	Koishi Herikawa		
2003	Scrapped Princess	Winia Chester, Celia		
2003	Last Exile	Alvis E. Hamilton, Tatiana Wisla		Press
2004	Angel Tales	Ran (Goldfish)		
2004	Gad Guard	Aiko Mary Harmony		
2004	Stellvia	Yayoi Fujisawa		
2004	Tsukihime, Lunar Legend	Arcueid Brunestud		
2004	Marmalade Boy	Miki Koishikawa		
2004–2005	Rave Master	Elie		
2004	SD Gundam Force	Sayla		
2004	Gungrave	Maria Asagi		
2004	Mobile Suit Gundam F91	Cecily Fairchild, Berah Ronah		
2004	Paranoia Agent	Tsukiko Sagi		
2005	Hanaukyo Maid Team	Konoe Tsurugi		
2005	Rumiko Takahashi Anthology	Ms. Kobato, Yukari		
2005	Mermaid Forest	Nanao's mother		
2005	Daphne in the Brilliant Blue	Shizuka Hayama		
2005	Koi Kaze	Kaname Chidori		
2005	The Melody of Oblivion	Melody of Oblivion		
2005	DearS	Miu		
2005–2006	Idaten Jump	Yuki		
2005	Thru the Moebius Strip	Young Jac		
2005–2006	IGPX	Elisa Doolittle	TV series	
2005	Le Portrait de Petit Cossette	Cossette d'Auvergne		
2005	Di Gi Charat	Rabi~en~Rose (Hikaru Usada)		
2005	Zatch Bell!	Naomi		Press
2005	Girls Bravo series	Miharu Sena Kanaka		
2006–2007	Haré+Guu	Addy		
2006	Kannazuki no Miko	Chikane Himemiya		
2006	Gun X Sword	Carmen 99		
2006	Boys Be...	Aki Mizutani		
2006	MÄR	Princess Snow, Koyuki		
2006–2014	Bleach	Rukia Kuchiki	Also films	
2007	Disgaea	Etna		
2007	The Melancholy of Haruhi Suzumiya	Yuki Nagato		
2008	Naruto	Sasame Fuma		
2008–2010	Blue Dragon	Kluke and Phoenix		
2008–2009	Code Geass: Lelouch of the Rebellion	Euphemia li Britannia, Lelouch vi Britannia (Young), Arthur the Cat, Mutsuki Minase		
2008	Lucky Star	Tsukasa Hiiragi, Minami Iwasaki, Minori Chihara (cameo), Yuki Nagato (cameo)		
2008	Gurren Lagann	Yoko Littner		
2010	Mobile Suit Gundam Unicorn	Mihiro Oiwakken		
2011	Durarara!!	Anri Sonohara		
2012	Lupin the Third: The Woman Called Fujiko Mine	Fujiko Mine		
2013–2015	Digimon Fusion	Sparrowmon		
2014	K	Sumika Inaba		
2014–2019	Sailor Moon	Luna	Viz Media dub	
2015–2016	Durarara!!x2	Anri Sonohara		
2014–present	Sword Art Online	Sinon, Akiyo Sada	2 seasons and movie	
2015	Lupin the Third Part IV: The Italian Adventure	Fujiko Mine	TV series	
2015	The Disappearance of Nagato Yuki-chan	Yuki Nagato		
2015	BlazBlue Alter Memory	Carl Clover		
2015	A Lull in the Sea	Manaka Mukaido		
2015	JoJo's Bizarre Adventure	Erina Pendleton		
2015–2017	Sailor Moon Crystal	Luna		
2016	The Asterisk War	Haruka Amagiri		
2016, 2019	Hunter × Hunter	Kikyo Zoldyck, others	2011 series	
2016–2017	Erased	Young Satoru Fujinuma		
2016	Pokémon Generations	Gabby		Tweet
2016–2017	God Eater	Sakuya Tachibana		
2017	Kakegurui	Kirari Momobami		
2017	Occultic;Nine	Ririka Nishizono		
2017	Anohana: The Flower We Saw That Day	Atsumu "Yukiatsu" Matsuyuki (Child)		
2018	Sword Gai	Arnys, Sayori		
2018	Lupin the Third Part V	Fujiko Mine	TV series	
2018	Naruto: Shippuden	Itachi Uchiha (young)		
2019	Ingress: The Animation	Sarah		
2019	Demon Slayer: Kimetsu no Yaiba	Takeo Kamado		
2020	Pokémon	Manager	Ep. "A Talent for Imitation!"; Credited under Additional Voices	
2021	Sakura Wars the Animation	Sumire Kanzaki		
2022	Lupin the Third: Part 6	Fujiko Mine		
2022	Kakegurui Twin	Kirari Momobami		
2022–present	Bleach: Thousand-Year Blood War	Rukia Kuchiki		

=== Animation ===
List of voice performances in animation
Year	Title	Role	Notes	Source
2001	The Oblongs	Yvette Ann Rebee Debbie		
2003	Tutenstein	Amisi		
2009	Little Nick	Nick's Mom		
2010	Respect the Pouch	Luna Balloona		
2010–2011	Wild Animal Baby Explorers	Ms. Sally, Skip		
2012	Lego Friends	Stephanie, Lacy	Credited as Sophie Roberts	
2014	Judge Dredd: Superfiend	Kid Sydney		

=== Films ===
List of voice performances in feature films
Year	Title	Role	Notes	Source
2003	Lupin the Third: The Mystery of Mamo	Fujiko Mine	CA	
2004	What the Bleep Do We Know!?	Voice Over Talent		
2006	Over the Hedge	Talking Doll, Telephone Toy		
2008	Kung Fu Panda	Additional voices	Uncredited (Note: At the Anime Banzai convention in Utah in 2009, Ruff mentioned how she was initially cast in the looping, but the movie used her voice part for Young Tai Lung.)	
2011	Hop	Fluffy the Pink Beret, Additional Voices	Credited under "ADR Voice Actors"	Press
2017	Sailor Moon R: The Movie	Luna	Viz dub	
2018	Lupin the Third: Legend of the Gold of Babylon	Fujiko Mine		
2018	Sailor Moon S: The Movie	Luna	Viz dub	
2018	Sailor Moon SuperS: The Movie	Luna	Viz dub	
2019	Lupin the Third: Blood Seal of the Eternal Mermaid	Fujiko Mine	(Special)	
2019	The Angry Birds Movie 2	Additional Voices		Closing credits
2020	Lupin the Third: Goodbye Partner	Fujiko Mine	(Special)	
2020	Lupin III: The First	Fujiko Mine		
2021	Demon Slayer: Kimetsu no Yaiba – The Movie: Mugen Train	Takeo Kamado		
2021	Sword Art Online Progressive: Aria of a Starless Night	Akiyo Sada	Theatrical release	
2022	The Bob's Burgers Movie	Additional Voices		
2023	Spider-Man: Across the Spider-Verse	Mayday Parker		
2025	Fixed	Emma, Additional Voices		
TBA	Spider-Man: Beyond the Spider-Verse	Mayday Parker	In production	

List of voice performances in direct-to-video and television films
Year	Title	Role	Notes	Source
2001	Akira	Kaori	Pioneer dub	
2003	WXIII: Patlabor the Movie 3	Noa Izumi		
2003	Sakura Wars: The Movie	Sumire Kanzaki		
2003	Cardcaptor Sakura Movie 2: The Sealed Card	Tomoyo Daidouji		
2005	Digimon Frontier: Island of Lost Digimon	Zoe Orimoto		
2008	Resident Evil: Degeneration	Rani Chawla		
2010	The Disappearance of Haruhi Suzumiya	Yuki Nagato		
2011	Kung Fu Panda: Secrets of the Masters	Village Bunny		
2012	Fate/stay night: Unlimited Blade Works	Saber		

=== Video games ===
List of voice performances in video games
Year	Title	Role	Notes	Source
1998	Jade Cocoon: Story of the Tamamayu	Mahbu	as Georgette Rose	
2003–2004	.hack//Liminality series	Mai Minase		
2003–present	Disgaea series	Etna, Desco		
2004	Seven Samurai 20XX	Jodie		
2005	Rave Master	Elie		
2006	Dirge of Cerberus: Final Fantasy VII	Incidental characters		
2007	Rogue Galaxy	Norma Kissleigh		
2007–2010	Bleach series	Rukia Kuchiki		
2007	Digimon World Data Squad	Yuma Kagura, Rosemon, Digivice		
2007–2018	Persona series	Yukari Takeba	Uncredited (Note: The closing credits do not list the voice actors involved.)	Press
2008	Tales of Vesperia	Rita Mordio	Uncredited	
2009–2014	Street Fighter IV series	Crimson Viper, Juni		
2009–present	BlazBlue series	Carl Clover	Uncredited	Facebook
2009	Magna Carta 2	Zephie		
2010–present	Sonic the Hedgehog series	Cream the Rabbit		
2011	Marvel vs. Capcom 3: Fate of Two Worlds	Crimson Viper	Also Ultimate	
2011	Catherine	Katherine McBride	NAVGTR Award for Supporting Performance in a Drama	
2011	Saints Row: The Third	Pedestrians		
2012	Dragon's Dogma	Aelinore, Quina		
2012	Resident Evil: Revelations	Jill Valentine		
2012	Resident Evil: Operation Raccoon City	Jill Valentine		
2012	Growlanser Wayfarer of Time			
2012	Divina	Clarisse, Claudia		
2012	Skullgirls	Eliza	DLC character	
2012–present	Lego Friends	Stephanie, Lacy	Credited as Sophie Roberts	
2013	Fire Emblem Awakening	Female Avatar, Noire		
2014	Akiba's Trip: Undead and Undressed	Toko Sagisaka		Tweet
2015	Danganronpa Another Episode: Ultra Despair Girls	Jataro Kemuri, Yuta Asahina		
2015	Resident Evil: Revelations 2	Jill Valentine	Raid Mode only	
2015	Xenoblade Chronicles X	Additional voices		
2016	Street Fighter V	C. Viper, Juni		
2017	Nier: Automata	Additional voices		
2017	Persona 5	Sadayo Kawakami		Tweet
2017	Fire Emblem Heroes	Soleil, Noire		
2019	Catherine: Full Body	Katherine McBride		
2019	Ace Combat 7: Skies Unknown	Húxiān		Tweet
2020	Persona 5 Royal	Sadayo Kawakami		
2020	The Legend of Heroes: Trails of Cold Steel IV	Scherazard Harvey		
2021	Nier Replicant ver.1.22474487139...	Additional voices		
2021	Akiba's Trip: Hellbound & Debriefed	Mana Kitada		
2021	Demon Slayer: Kimetsu no Yaiba – The Hinokami Chronicles	Takeo Kamado		
2022	Fire Emblem Warriors: Three Hopes	Additional voices		
2023	Street Fighter 6	Juni, C. Viper		
2023	Trinity Trigger	Additional voices		
2023	The Legend of Heroes: Trails into Reverie	Scherazard Arnor, citizens		
2024	Granblue Fantasy: Relink	Additional voices		
2024	Persona 3 Reload	Mayoido Antiques owner		
2025	Trails in the Sky 1st Chapter	Scherazard Harvey		
2026	Trails in the Sky 2nd Chapter	Scherazard Harvey		

=== Other ===
List of appearances in other media
Year	Title	Role	Notes	Source
2007	Adventures of the ASOS Brigade	Herself	Web series	
2008	Adventures in Voice Acting	Herself	Documentary	
