= Yoshiyuki Kono (voice actor) =

Japanese voice actor

Yoshiyuki Kono (幸野 善之, Kōno Yoshiyuki; born May 21) is a Japanese voice actor from Tokyo who is affiliated with Aoni. He attended the Osaka University of Arts.

== Notable Roles ==
=== Video Game Roles ===
- Dynasty Warriors and Warriors Orochi series as Meng Huo, Zhang He
- Der Langrisser as Morgan
- Voltage Fighter Gowcaizer as Marion, Ball Boy

=== Drama CD Roles ===
- Emerald Dragon as Nakai Kazuya

=== Anime Roles ===
- Angelic Layer as Shuji Inada; Host
- Code Geass: Lelouch of the Rebellion as Gilbert G.P. Guilford
- Code Geass: Lelouch of the Rebellion R2 as Gilbert G.P. Guilford
- Dragon Ball Z as Yakon
- Gegege no Kitarō (1996)
- Gregory Horror Show as Cactus Gunman; Judgement Boy (2nd Voice)
- Jigoku Sensei Nube as Ishikawa-sensei
- Kuso Kagaku Sekai Gulliver Boy as Man (ep. 1); Resistance man (eps. 13, 14, 48)
- Marmalade Boy as Bob; Sakurai
- Otogi Zoshi as Customer (ep. 25)
- Sailor Moon as Soldier (ep. 44)
- Sailor Moon Sailor Stars as Choreographer (ep. 176); College Student (ep. 191); DJ (ep. 195); Mysterious Person (ep. 183); Staff (ep. 175)
- Sailor Moon SuperS as Candy Vender (ep 146); Editor 1 (ep. 134)
- Slam Dunk as Male Student (ep. 3), Satoro Sasaoka (eps. 30-36), Senior (ep. 32)
- Yu-Gi-Oh! as Chairman (ep. 12); Radio announcer (ep. 2); Teacher (ep. 7); Watchmaker's shop salesperson (ep. 4)
- Zone of the Enders as Worker (Ep. 2)

=== Tokusatsu Roles ===
- Mirai Sentai Timeranger as Hacker Yuugento (ep. 35)
- Tokumei Sentai Go-Busters as Domeloid (ep. 38)

=== OVA Roles ===
- Kishin Corps as Messenger (ep. 7)
- Legend of Crystania as Fang of the Animals
- Voltage Fighter Gowcaizer as Ball Boy, Saburo Jumonji/Brider 2

=== Movie Roles ===
- Sailor Moon S: The Movie as Press
- Howling Basketman Spirit!! as Yoshi Ebina
