= Rie Tanaka =

Japanese voice actress (born 1979)

- 田中 理恵
- Born: January 3, 1979 (age 47); Sapporo, Japan
- Occupations: Voice actress; singer
- Years active: 1997–present
- Agent: Office Anemone
- Spouse: Koichi Yamadera (m. 2012; div. 2018)
- Musical career
- Genres: Anison; J-pop; Metal
- Instrument: Vocals
- Labels: Aniplex (1997–2000); Victor Entertainment (2001–2003); Geneon Universal (2004–2009); Wave Master Happies (2010–present)

Japanese name
- Kanji: 田中 理恵
- Hiragana: たなか りえ
- Katakana: タナカ リエ
Transcriptions
- Romanization: Tanaka Rie

Rie Tanaka (田中 理恵, Tanaka Rie; born January 3, 1979) is a Japanese voice actress and singer. Notable among her numerous roles in anime are Lacus Clyne in Mobile Suit Gundam Seed and Mobile Suit Gundam Seed Destiny, Chi in Chobits, Hikari Kujou/Shiny Luminous in Futari wa Pretty Cure Max Heart, Minna-Dietlinde Wilcke in Strike Witches and Suigintou in the anime adaptation of Rozen Maiden. In video games, she provides the voice of title character Neptune in the Hyperdimension Neptunia franchise, Morrigan Aensland in Ultimate Marvel vs. Capcom 3 and Project X Zone, Sesshoin Kiara in Fate/Extra CCC and Fate/Grand Order, both versions of Himeko in the Honkai series, Mitsuru Kirijo in Persona 3, Lisa Minci in Genshin Impact and Ciel in Megaman Zero. She is also the singer of Swedish-Japanese heavy metal band Uz:ME.

== Biography ==
When Tanaka was in elementary school, she was a member of the book club. She loved to read to others, and would give picture story shows to the younger students in the morning before the homeroom teacher came to the classroom. One of the activities of the book committee was to hold a picture-story show competition in the audio-visual room, and when the students saw her picture-story show, they were delighted. She loved reading and illustrations to begin with, especially those of Mutsumi Inomata, and her desire to become a voice actress was directly triggered when she bought and listened to the drama CD CD Theater Dragon Quest, whose jacket illustration was done by Inomata, at a bookstore.

When she was in high school, she was a member of the Manga Research Club and participated in the Manga Nationals, where she directly appealed to Kazuhiko Shimamoto, a judge from her hometown, that she wanted to be a voice actor. After graduating from high school, she moved to Tokyo and enrolled in the voice acting course at Yoyogi Animation Academy. As she was very fond of reading and taking care of children, becoming a nursery teacher was also a big dream of hers. She was torn between going on to higher education and becoming a nursery teacher or becoming a voice actor, but she chose the latter because she wanted to bring her voice to children in a larger world, not stopping at one world. While still in school, Tanaka won the grand prize at the vocal audition held by MediaWorks & Scitron Digital Contents. She made her debut in the entertainment industry when she sang the opening theme song for the PlayStation version of "Eien no Shin'yū" in Yūkyū Gensōkyoku 2nd Album. This is why her debut as a singer was earlier than her debut as a voice actor. At the same time, she also participated in the theatrical anime Rurouni Kenshin: The Motion Picture as a minor role. She made her debut as an agency voice actress in 1999, playing the role of Mitsuki Sanada, one of the heroines in Dual! Parallel Trouble Adventure. 2006 saw her first starring role as Hiroko Matsukata in Hataraki Man.

Due to management reasons, Tanaka moved from Dramatic Department, to which she had belonged for many years, to Retreat on April 1, 2008, and to Office Anemone on March 1, 2019.

In addition to voice acting, Tanaka is also active in music, singing character songs for some works, and sometimes releasing singles under her own name. On April 26, 2019, it was announced that she will be working as a YouTuber under the show name "Rie Tanaka TV."

== Personal life ==
Tanaka's favorite phrase is "Never get discouraged, never run away, never give up," and she has been actively increasing her Twitter friends since around 2010, including Rina Satō and Kenjiro Hata. However, on June 23, 2013, a man with a knife intruded a Neptunia promotion where Tanaka was present, yelling "Give me Tanaka! I am the victim!". In the hustle, Tanaka fell and bruised her knee, and after the incident, she took a break from Twitter and later returned in 2014.

On June 17, 2012, Tanaka announced on her blog that she had married voice actor Koichi Yamadera. A year later, she disbanded her official fan club, "Cafe de Rie." She co-starred with Yamadera as Kusuo's maternal grandparents in 2016's The Disastrous Life of Saiki K.. On August 3, 2018, she announced on Twitter that she and Yamadera had divorced in July.

== Filmography ==
=== Anime ===
List of voice performances in anime
Year	Title	Role	Notes	Ref.
1998	Dokkiri Doctor	Akiko	debut role	
1999	Hello Kitty's Paradise	Mimmy		
1999	Shin Hakkenden	Yumi		
1999	Dual! Parallel Trouble Adventure	Mitsuki Sanada	Also voices Mitsuki's reincarnation, Miki Steinbeck in Tenchi Muyo! Ryo-Ohki OVA 5	
1999	Great Teacher Onizuka	Akane Fujita		
1999	Kyorochan	Mayu		
1999–2001	Steel Angel Kurumi series	Saki		
2000	Miami Guns	Kaken Musume		
2000	Yu-Gi-Oh!	Vivian Wong		
2000	Case Closed	Yumemi Noda (ep 190), Naeko Miike		
2000	Amon: The Darkside of The Devilman	Miko	OVA	
2000	Gravitation	Ayaka Usami		
2001	Sadamitsu the Destroyer	Yayoi Kamishiro		
2001	Hanaukyo Maid Team	Mariel		
2001	Hello Kitty's Animation Theater	Mimmy		
2001–2003	Angel Tales	Ran the goldfish		
2002	Full Metal Panic!	Ren Mikihara		
2002	Chobits	Chi		
2002	.hack//Sign	Morganna Mode Gone		
2002	Azumanga Daioh	Koyomi Mizuhara		
2002	Atashinchi no	Fubuki Haruyama		
2002–2006	UFO Princess Valkyrie series	Sanada		
2002–2003	Mobile Suit Gundam SEED	Lacus Clyne		
2002	Pocket Monsters Advanced Generation	Saori; サオリ		
2003	Stellvia	Akira Kayama		
2003	DNAngel	Towa		
2003	Di Gi Charat Nyo!	Mosana		
2003	Full Metal Panic? Fumoffu!	Ren Mikihara		
2004	Burn Up Scramble	Matsuri Tamagawa		
2004	Hanaukyo Maid Team La Verite	Mariel		
2004	Burst Angel	Sei		
2004	Ichigeki Sacchu!! HoiHoi-san	RRX-7.8 Combat-san		
2004–2011	Ring ni Kakero 1 series	Kiku Takane		
2004–2006, 2013	Rozen Maiden series	Suigintou		
2004–2005	Mobile Suit Gundam Seed Destiny	Lacus Clyne, Meer Campbell		
2004–2005	Tales of Phantasia the Animation	Martel	OVA series	
2005	Futari wa Pretty Cure – Max Heart	Hikari Kujo / Shiny Lumionus		
2005	Hell Girl	Akane Sawai, Cheppo		
2005–2006	Onegai My Melody	Tsukune		
2005	My-Otome	Tomoe Marguerite		
2006	Ray the Animation	Kaori		
2006	Air Gear	Simca		
2006	The Good Witch of the West	Leandra Cheviat		
2006	The Third: The Girl with the Blue Eye	Fira Malik; フィラ・マリーク		
2006	Pokémon: Diamond & Pearl	Mars		
2006	Red Garden	Lula		
2006	Shōnen Onmyōji	Tenitsu		
2006–2007	Onegai My Melody: KuruKuru Shuffle!	Tsukune		
2006	Fist of the Blue Sky	Sophie		
2006	Katekyo Hitman Reborn!	Bianchi		
2006	Hataraki Man	Hiroko Matsukata		
2006	Strain: Strategic Armored Infantry	Mary, Isabella		
2007–2020	Strike Witches	Minna-Dietlinde Wilcke	OVA and 4 TV series	
2007	My-Otome Zwei	Tomoe Marguerite	OVA vol. 2	
2007	Moonlight Mile series	Riyoko Ikeuchi		
2007–2013	Hayate the Combat Butler series	Maria		
2007	Wangan Midnight	Rikako Ota		
2007–present	Higurashi When They Cry	Nomura		
2007	Mononoke	Shino		
2007	Red Garden: Dead Girls	Aunt; おばさん	OVA	
2007	Kimikiss pure rouge	Eriko Futami		
2007	Rental Magica	Kikyou Katsuragi		
2008	Kimi ga Aruji de Shitsuji ga Ore de	Ageha Kuki		
2008–2010	Yume-Miru Anime on-chan; ja:ユメミル、アニメ「onちゃん」	On-Chan		
2008	Rin: Daughters of Mnemosyne	Sayara Yamanobe		
2008	Macross Frontier	Monica Lange, Miranda Merin		
2008	Allison and Lilia	Erishia-Lowry (Claire Nihito); エリシア・ラウリー（クレア・ニヒトー）		
2008	The Tower of Druaga: The Aegis of Uruk	Ishtar, narrator		
2008	Toradora!	Yuri Koigakubo		
2008–2013	Yozakura Quartet series	Mariabelle		
2008	Akaneiro ni Somaru Saka	Mitsuki Siina		
2008–2016	夢想夏郷, 東方 (Touhou Musou Kakyou / A Summer Day's Dream)	Sakuya Izayoi	Ep. "Musō Kakyō"	
2009	The Girl Who Leapt Through Space	Xanthippe		
2009	Asura Cryin' series	Shuri Kurosaki		
2009	Queen's Blade series	Nyx		
2009	Arad Senki: Slap Up Party	Hiria		
2009	Tears to Tiara	Octavia		
2009	First Love Limited	Misaki Yamamoto		
2009	Canaan	Liang Qi		
2009	My-Otome Zwei Complete	Tomoe Marguerite	OVA	
2010	Arakawa Under the Bridge series	Shimazaki		
2010	Crayon Shin-chan	Shōko Yasema		
2010	MM!	Michiru Onigawara		
2010–2014	Squid Girl series	Chizuru Aizawa		
2011	Nekogami Yaoyorozu	Amaterasu; 天照大神		
2011	C3	Alice Bivorio Basskreigh		
2011–2012	Horizon on the Middle of Nowhere series	Juana		
2011	Maken-ki! series	Demitra Midia		
2012	Lagrange: The Flower of Rin-ne series	Eri Watabe		
2012	Aquarion Evol	Alicia		
2012	Leiji Matsumoto's Ozma	Maya		
2012	Ginga e Kickoff!!	Anzu		
2012	Muv-Luv Alternative: Total Eclipse	Sharon Heim		
2012	Zettai Junpaku: Mahō Shōjo	Misae Suzuhara	OVA	
2012	Chōsoku Henkei Gyrozetter	Akamei cumulative; 赤名累		
2012	Girls und Panzer	Maho Nishizumi		
2013	Red Data Girl	Himegami		
2013	Space Battleship Yamato 2199	Akira Yamamoto		
2013	Hyperdimension Neptunia: The Animation	Neptune / Purple Heart		
2015	Mobile Suit Gundam: Iron-Blooded Orphans	Merribit Stapleton		
2016	The Disastrous Life of Saiki K.	Kumi Saiki		
2017–2019	Granblue Fantasy The Animation series	Rosetta		
2019	Dr. Stone	Darya Nikitina		
2020	Arte	Sofia		
2018–2021	That Time I Got Reincarnated as a Slime	Treyni		
2021	Mushoku Tensei: Jobless Reincarnation	Elinalise Dragonroad		
2021	Idoly Pride	Kiriko Himeno		
2021	Yasuke	Ichika		
2021	Record of Ragnarok	Aphrodite		
2023	Rail Romanesque 2	Kaniko		
2025	The Unaware Atelier Master	Ophilia		

=== Film ===
List of voice performances in film
Year	Title	Role	Notes	Ref.
1999	My Neighbors the Yamadas	Ghibli Cheering Section		
2003	Atashinchi	Fubuki Haruyama; 春山ふぶき		
2007	The Garden of Sinners: Overlooking View	Kirie Fujou		
2008	The Garden of Sinners: The Hollow Shrine	Kirie Fujou		
2009	Macross Frontier: Itsuwari no Utahime	Monica Lange		
2010	Doraemon: Nobita's Great Battle of the Mermaid King	Sofia		
2010	Time of Eve	Sammy		
2011	Macross Frontier: Sayonara no Tsubasa	Monica Lange		
2011	Hayate the Combat Butler! Heaven Is a Place on Earth	Maria		
2012	Strike Witches: The Movie	Minna-Dietlinde Wilcke		
2013	Persona 3 The Movie: No. 1, Spring of Birth	Mitsuru Kirijo		
2013	Lupin the 3rd vs. Detective Conan: The Movie	Naeko Miike		
2014	Persona 3 The Movie: No. 2, Midsummer Knight's Dream	Mitsuru Kirijo		
2015	Persona 3 The Movie: No. 3, Falling Down	Mitsuru Kirijo		
2015	Girls und Panzer der Film	Maho Nishizumi		
2016	Persona 3 The Movie: No. 4, Winter of Rebirth	Mitsuru Kirijo		
2023	Rakudai Majo: Fūka to Yami no Majo	Reia		
2024	Mobile Suit Gundam SEED Freedom	Lacus Clyne		

=== Video games ===
List of voice performances in video games
Year	Title	Role	Notes	Ref.
2000	St. Luminous Mission High School	Katou Mihoko	PS1/PS2	
2001	Mega Man Zero series	Ciel		
2002	Azumanga Daioh games	Koyomi Mizuhara	PS1/PS2	
2003	Chobits games	Chi	PS1/PS2	
2003	Ichigeki Sacchu!! HoiHoi-san	RRX-7.8 Combat-san	PS1/PS2	
2004	Stellvia	Akira Kayama	PS1/PS2	
2004	Magna Carta	Elaine; イレイン	PS1/PS2; Also Portable in 2006	
2004–2007	Shonen Onmyoji games	Tianyi; 天一		
2005	Namco × Capcom	Ki, Sylphie	PS2	
2005	Pretty Cure Max Heart games	Hikari Kujo / Shiny Luminous		
2006–2007, 2014	Rozen Maiden video games	Suigintou	PS2, PS3, and PS Vita	
2006	Kimikiss	Eriko Futami	PS2	
2006–2009	Persona 3 games	Mitsuru Kirijo	Also FES and Portable	
2006–2009	Phantasy Star Universe games	Karen Ella / Milly, Helga Neumann	PS1/PS2; Also Portable and Portable 2	
2006	Tales of Phantasia	Martel	PSP	
2006	My-Otome games	Tomoe Marguerite	PS1/PS2	
2007–2010	Reborn! games	Bianchi		
2007	Everybody's Golf 5	Yumin; ユミン	PS3	
2007–2009	Hayate the Combat Butler games	Maria	DS	
2007	Higurashi When They Cry games	Nomura	PS1/PS2	
2008	Luminous Arc 2	Sophia	DS	
2008–2009	Tears to Tiara games	Octavia	Starting 2008	
2008	Fatal Frame: Mask of the Lunar Eclipse	Haibara Sakuya; 灰原朔夜		
2008–2009	Akaneiro ni Somaru Saka games	Shiina Mizuki	PS1/PS2	
2008–2009	Memories Off 6: T-wave	Rein Suzushiro,稲穂鈴	PS1/PS2; Also Next Relation	
2008	Rune Factory Frontier	Drop	Wii	
2009	Dengeki Gakuen RPG: Cross of Venus	Kurosaki Shukairi; 黒崎朱浬	DS	
2009–2010	11eyes CrossOver games	Kanae Kuroshiba Kanae		
2009	Toradora Portable!	Yuri Koigakubo	PSP	
2009–2010	Strike Witches games	Minna-Dietlinde Wilcke		
2009–2011	Queen's Blade games	Nyx	PSP	
2010	Blaze Union: Story to Reach the Future	Medoute, Jiruva; メデューテ / ジルヴァ	PSP	
2010	Dragon Nest	Elena		
2010	Tales of Phantasia: Narikiri Dungeon X	Martell; マーテル	PSP	
2010	Another Century's Episode: R	Monica Landa; モニカ・ランダ	PS3	
2010–present	Hyperdimension Neptunia	Neptune / Purple Heart		
2011	Marvel vs. Capcom 3: Fate of Two Worlds	Morrigan Aensland	Also Ultimate, replaces Yayoi Jinguji	
2011	A Certain Scientific Railgun	Mio Aizono	PSP	
2011	Call of Duty: Modern Warfare 3	AC-130FCO		
2012	Project Zero 2: Wii Edition		Wii	
2012	Time Travelers	Itoyama Junko; 糸山純子		
2012	Aquapazza: Aquaplus Dream Match	Octavia	PS3	
2012	Project X Zone	Morrigan Aensland	3DS	
2012	Tales of Xillia 2	Vera	PS3	
2013	Horizon on the Middle of Nowhere games	Juana	PSP	
2013–present	Final Fantasy XIV	Kan-E-Senna, Garuda, Sophia, Sadu, Ameliance	PS3, PS4, PC, Mac	
2013	Fate/Extra CCC	Kiara Sesshoin	PSP	
2013	Super Robot Wars Operation Extend	Monica Lange	PSP	
2013	Drakengard 3	One	PS3	
2014–present	Granblue Fantasy	Rosetta	Browser game, Android, iOS	
2014	Persona Q: Shadow of the Labyrinth	Mitsuru Kirijo	3DS	
2014	The Legend of Heroes: Trails to Azure Evolution	Mariabel Crois		
2014	CV: Casting Voice	Nishinomiyatera Milly; 西宮寺美礼	PS3	
2014	Girls und Panzer games	Maho Nishizumi		
2014	Persona 4 Arena Ultimax	Mitsuru Kirijo	PS3	
2015	Devil Survivor 2 Record Breaker	Miyako Hotsuin	3DS	
2015	Project X Zone 2: Brave New World	Morrigan Aensland, Sylphie	3DS	
2016	Senran Kagura: Estival Versus	Jasmine		
2016	Skullgirls 2nd encore	Parasoul		
	Mobile Suit Gundam Seed games	Lacus Clyne	PC	
2016	World of Final Fantasy	Faris Scherwiz		
2017	Fate/Grand Order	Kiara Sesshoin	Android, IOS	
2017	Dissidia Final Fantasy Opera Omnia	Faris Scherwiz	Android, iOS	
2017	Honkai Impact 3rd	Himeko	Android, iOS, PC	
2018	Azur Lane	HMS Duke of York (17), Neptune / Purple Heart	Android, iOS	
2019	Punishing: Gray Raven	Haicma	Android, iOS	
2019	Teppen	Morrigan Aensland	Android, iOS	
2020	Nioh 2	Nōhime		
2020–2021	Dragalia Lost	Ariel, Rose Queen	Android, iOS	
2020	Genshin Impact	Lisa	Android, iOS, PC, PS4, Switch	
2020–present	Identity V	Mary (Bloody Queen)	Android, iOS, PC	
2021	Ash Arms	Messerschmitt Me 262, Kyushu J7W Shinden	Android, IOS	
2021	Girls' Frontline	ZB-26, LTLX7000	Android, IOS	
2021	Resident Evil Village	Bela Dimitrescu	PS4, Xbox One, PC, PS5, Xbox Series X/S, Stadia	
2021	Mobile Legends: Adventure	Eudora, Aurora	Android, iOS	
2021	Langrisser Mobile	Rozenciel	Android, iOS	
2021	Magia Record	Minou	Android, IOS	
2021	Shiro Project:RE	Kibougamine Gakuen	Android, iOS, PC	
2021	Counter:Side	Anastasia Chernova, Serapel	Android, iOS, PC	
2022	Blue Archive	Mimori Mizuha	Android, iOS	
2022	Mobile Legends: Adventure	Nimbus Eudora	Android, iOS	
2022	Massage Freaks	Mirei Ranjou	Switch	
2022	Path to Nowhere	Ninety-Nine	Android, iOS	
2022	Goddess of Victory: Nikke	Ingrid, Isabel	Android, iOS	
2022	Return to Shironagasu Island	Riehl Bextor	PC, Switch	
2023	Octopath Traveler II	Throne Anguis	PS4, PS5, PC, Switch	
2023	Honkai: Star Rail	Himeko	Android, iOS, PC, PS4, PS5	
2023	TEVI	Empress Dahlia, Queen Tahlia, Revenance	PC, Switch, PS4, PS5, Xbox	
2024	Persona 3 Reload	Mitsuru Kirijo	PC, PS4, PS5, Xbox One, Xbox Series X/S	
2025	Ensemble Stars!	Hiyori Tomoe (young)	iOS, Android	

=== Tokusatsu ===
List of voice performances in tokusatsu
Year	Title	Role	Notes	Ref.
2011-2012	Kamen Rider Fourze	Virgo Zodiarts, Shun Daimonji's Mother	Ep. 18–42 (Virgo Zodiarts), 41 (Shun Daimonji's Mother)	
2011	Kamen Rider × Kamen Rider Fourze & OOO: Movie War Mega Max	Virgo Zodiarts	Movie	

=== Drama CDs ===
List of voice performances in audio dramas
Title	Role	Notes	Ref.
Akaneiro ni Somaru Saka	Mitsuki Siina		
Hayate the Combat Butler	Maria		
Macross Frontier	Monica Lange		
Hello Kitty	Mimmy		
My-Hime Destiny	Hinagiku		
Squid Girl	Aizawa Chizuru		
Shounen Onmyouji: Kazane-hen			
Karakurizōshi Ayatsuri Sakon	Suzuna unknown; 鈴鳴未知		
Getbackers	Haruki Kaoruryu		
My Bride is a Mermaid	Seto-chan		
Wanna Be the Strongest in the World	Kazama		

=== Dubbing ===
Voice over performances
Title	Role	Voice dub for	Notes	Ref.
Justice League	Mera	Amber Heard		
Aquaman	Mera	Amber Heard		
Zack Snyder's Justice League	Mera	Amber Heard		
Aquaman and the Lost Kingdom	Mera	Amber Heard		
Ant-Man and the Wasp	Ava Starr / Ghost	Hannah John-Kamen		
Avengers: Doomsday	Ava Starr / Ghost	Hannah John-Kamen		
Thunderbolts*	Ava Starr / Ghost	Hannah John-Kamen		
Adventure Time	Princess Bubblegum	Hynden Walch	Animation	
Power Rangers S.P.D.	Katherine "Kat" Manx	Michelle Langstone		
Castle Rock	Annie Wilkes	Lizzy Caplan		
Resident Evil: Welcome to Raccoon City	Ada Wong	Lily Gao		
Send Help	Linda Liddle	Rachel McAdams		

== Discography ==
=== with Uz:ME ===
- SPEKTRA (2024)

=== Songs anime/video games ===
- Azumanga Daioh
  - Oishii Kimitachi (Yomi's image song)
  - Sorezore no One Way (Yomi's second image song)
- Bakuretsu Tenshi – Breathe (Sei's image song)
- Chobits
  - Raison d'être (ED1) (Reason To Be)
  - Ningyo hime (ED2) (Doll/Mermaid Princess)
  - I Hear You Everywhere (Chi image song)
  - Hitomi no Tonneru
  - Shiranai Sora
- Dual! Parallel Trouble Adventure
  - "DUAL!" (alternate version in episode 14)
- Mega Man Zero Soundtracks
  - L'oiseau du Bonheur (vocal version of Ciel's theme, 'Labo', for Remastered Tracks Rockman Zero IDEA)
  - Freesia (vocal version of the 'Promise -Next New World- (Overseas Version)' and 'Esperanto' songs for Remastered Tracks Rockman Zero PHYSIS)
- Gundam SEED
  - Shizuka na Yoru ni (静かな夜に, In the Quiet Night)
  - Mizu no Akashi (水の証, Token of Water)
- Hayate no Gotoku!
  - Epu Romanesque (Maria character song)
  - Kakurenbo (2nd character song)
  - Kanpeki, Egao Desu
- Gundam SEED Destiny
  - Fields of Hope
  - EMOTION
  - Quiet Night C.E. 73
- Hyperdimension Neptunia
  - Lady Cool -パープルハート- (Neptune's image song)
  - スマイル・スパイラル (Neptune/Nepgear image song, performed with Yui Horie)
- Hanaukyo Maid Tai – Song of the Hanaukyo Maid team
- Hanaukyo Maid Tai La Verite – Voice of heart
- Mabinogi – Eternal (for the commercial of the Mabinogi game in Japan)
- Toradora! Character Song Album
  - TANPOPO (Yuri Koigakubo's theme)

=== Singles ===
==== Raison d'être ====
Released May 22, 2002, Victor Entertainment.

1. Raison d'être
2. Hitomi no Tunnel
3. Raison d'être (Original Karaoke)

==== Ningyo Hime ====
Released August 21, 2002, Victor Entertainment.

1. Ningyo Hime
2. Soshite Sekai wa Kyomo Hajimaru -Chii Ver.-
3. Kata Koto no Koi -Chii Ver.-
4. Ningyo Hime (without Rie)

==== Yasashii Jikan no Naka de ====
Released August 10, 2009, label unknown.

1. Yasashii Jikan no Naka de
2. Yasashii Jikan no Naka de (Piano version)
3. Yasashii Jikan no Naka de ~Instrumental~

=== Albums ===
==== garnet ====
Released February 7, 2001, Aniplex Music.

1. Eien ni Shinyu (a cappella version)
2. Boku wa kimi ga suki
3. Have You Never Been Mellow
4. KISS Kara Hajimaru Miracle (Jazz Version)
5. Like a favorite song
6. garnet
7. Umi no mieru oka de
8. Anata ni nita hito
9. SKY
10. Tadaima

==== 24 wishes ====
Released January 3, 2003, Victor Entertainment.

==== Kokoro ====
Release: October 20, 2010, Geneon Universal.

1. Let it be
2. Dilemma
3. in or out?
4. Tsuki to Dance (月とダンス, Dance with the Moon)
5. SUPERMAN
6. Ningyo Hime no Namida (人魚姫の涙, Mermaid Princess' tears)
7. FRAME
8. Kokoro (ココロ, Heart)
9. Sora Tobu Pierrot (空飛ぶピエロ)
10. Orange

=== Mini albums ===
==== Chara de Rie ====
Released September 10, 2003, Victor Entertainment. The album reached No. 34 on Oricon weekly chart and stayed on charts in 4 weeks.

1. Katakoto no Koi -Chii Ver.-
2. Let Me Be With You -Chii Ver.-
3. Soshite Sekai wa Kyou mo Hajimaru -Chii Ver.-
4. Mizu no Akashi -Acoustic Ver.-
5. Shizuka na Yoru ni
6. JUDY
