= Angelic Layer =

Japanese manga series by Clamp

- Manga volume 1 cover (English edition), featuring Misaki Suzuhara (left) and Hikaru

エンジェリックレイヤー (Enjerikku Reiyā)
- Genre: Adventure; Science fiction comedy
- Manga
- Written by: Clamp
- Published by: Kadokawa Shoten
- English publisher: NA: Tokyopop (expired) Dark Horse Comics
- Magazine: Shōnen Ace
- Original run: July 1, 1999 – October 1, 2001
- Volumes: 5
- Anime television series

Battle Doll Angelic Layer
- Directed by: Hiroshi Nishikiori
- Produced by: Masahiko Minami; Shinsaku Hatta; Taihei Yamanishi
- Written by: Ichirō Ōkouchi
- Music by: Kohei Tanaka
- Studio: Bones
- Licensed by: AUS: Madman Entertainment (expired); NA: ADV Films (expired) Sentai Filmworks (expired); UK: Anime Limited (expired)
- Original network: TV Tokyo
- English network: NA: Anime Network; ZA: Animax
- Original run: April 1, 2001 – September 23, 2001
- Episodes: 26

Angelic Layer (Japanese: エンジェリックレイヤー, Hepburn: Enjerikku Reiyā) is a Japanese manga series created by Clamp. The manga was published in Japan by Kadokawa Shoten, and in English originally by Tokyopop, but has since been re-licensed by Dark Horse Comics. It was the group's first work using a significantly pared-down style, which lowered emphasis on detail and accentuated posing and gestures. It would later be repeated in series like Chobits and Tsubasa: Reservoir Chronicle.

The manga was adapted into a 26-episode anime series produced by Bones titled Battle Doll: Angelic Layer (機動天使エンジェリックレイヤー, Kidō Tenshi Enjerikku Reiyā; lit. 'Angelic Layer: Mobile Angel') which aired on TV Tokyo from April 1, 2001 – September 23, 2001. Seven volumes of videos were released by ADV Films on VHS and DVD in 2003. It was re-released in 2005 as a five-volume box set. North American publisher Dark Horse Comics re-released Angelic Layer in omnibus format in 2011. Sentai Filmworks re-released the series under their Sentai Selects label on November 24, 2015. Anime Limited re-released the series in the United Kingdom in 2018.

Angelic Layer takes place in the same universe as Clamp's later work Chobits, which similarly deals with the relationship between humans, human-created devices, toys, and godlike power. Several characters also appear in Clamp's Tsubasa: Reservoir Chronicle including most of the main characters, as well as the angel Blanche.

== Plot ==
The primary protagonist is Misaki Suzuhara. Despite her short stature, she is a seventh grader who just moved to Tokyo to live with her aunt, Shouko Asami. After arriving in the city outside of Tokyo Station, Misaki watches a battle between two dolls on a big live-screen called Angelic Layer, a highly popular game in which players (called Deus) buy and custom-design dolls known as Angels that are moved by mental control when on a field called the "layer".

Interested in learning about Angelic Layer, an eccentric man wearing a white lab coat and glasses, calling himself "Icchan" (いっちゃん), encourages Misaki to purchase and create her own angel. She wants the angel to be "a short girl, but strong and happy", and names it Hikaru, based on Hikaru Shidō from Clamp's Magic Knight Rayearth (a manga in Angelic Layer's world). Even though she's clueless about the game, Misaki soon competes in tournaments and is assisted and watched carefully by Icchan. Later, Icchan's identity is revealed as Ichiro Mihara, the co-creator of Angelic Layer.

Misaki begins studying at the Eriol Academy, an educational institution that includes grades from kindergarten through high school. There she becomes friends with Hatoko Kobayashi, a very intelligent and mature kindergarten girl who is a famous Deus and an Angelic Layer expert. Her incredibly fast angel Suzuka is a favorite contender in tournaments. Misaki also befriends Hatoko's older brother Kōtarō and his friend Tamayo Kizaki, a girl fascinated by martial arts. Both turn out to be Misaki's classmates.

While adjusting to her new surroundings, Misaki is also gripped by her past. Her thoughts often dwell on her mother, whom she has not seen since pre-school. Eventually, Misaki learns that her mother was key in the development of Angelic Layer, which she worked on in an attempt to develop a perfect prosthesis for her multiple sclerosis, which has confined her to a wheelchair. Her mother is also the Deus of Athena and the champion of Angelic Layer.

Differences between the manga and the anime adaptation: Misaki names her angel after her favorite doll from childhood. In the manga, her angel is named after a character she saw in a manga she read on the train, and it is heavily implied that this character is Hikaru from Clamp's older work Magic Knight Rayearth. The ending to the manga also has different couplings. In the manga, Misaki's mother does not have multiple sclerosis. Icchan plays an important role in the Chobits storyline, but this connection was reduced to a single scene in the anime; the Chobits anime was also made by Madhouse instead of Bones. Kaede's younger brother Minoru is also a Chobits character.

== Media ==
=== Manga ===
==== Japanese version by Kadokawa Shoten/English version by Tokyopop ====
No.	Original release date	Original ISBN	North American release date	North American ISBN
1	July 1, 1999	4-04-713283-7	June 25, 2002	1-931514-47-X
2	March 9, 2000	4-04-713319-1	September 17, 2002	1-59182-003-0
3	December 1, 2000	4-04-713375-2	November 12, 2002	1-59182-004-9
4	May 1, 2001	4-04-713414-7	January 7, 2003	1-59182-086-3
5	October 1, 2001	4-04-713454-6	March 11, 2003	1-59182-152-5

==== English version by Dark Horse Comics ====
- Angelic Layer Book 1 (ISBN 1-61655-021-X/978-1-61655-021-9; 2012-09-19): Includes chapters 1–20 (volumes 1–3)
- Angelic Layer Book 2 (ISBN 1-61655-128-3/978-1-61655-128-5; 2013-03-27): Includes chapters 21–40 (volumes 3–5)

== Music ==
Opening Theme:

- "Be My Angel"

Lyrics by: Gorō Matsui
Composition by: Takahiro Ando, Gorō Matsui
Arrangement by: Takahiro Ando
Song by: Atsuko Enomoto

Ending Theme:

- "The Starry Sky" (☆the starry sky☆)

Lyrics by: HALNA
Composition by: Atsushi Sato
Arrangement by: HAL
Song by: HAL

- "After the rain" (雨あがり, Ame Agari)

Lyrics by: Chisa Tanabe
Composition by: Kazuhiro Hara
Arrangement by: Takao Kōnishi
Song by: Moeko Matsushita

All of the background musical scores were composed, arranged and conducted by Kōhei Tanaka.

== Reception ==
Angelic Layer won the Animation Kobe Award for TV Feature in 2001. Jason Bustard of THEM Anime Reviews gave Angelic Layer a five-star rating, noting that the character designs were well-presented and the animation was colourful. He also said that Angelic Layer portrayed the concepts of friendship and how "through common interests, even very different people can be friends". Zac Bertschy of Anime News Network however, published a less favorable review, comparing it to Pokémon and Digimon, and calling it a glorified tie-in to "a toy you can't purchase". Writing in the third edition of The Anime Encyclopedia (2015), Jonathan Clements and Helen McCarthy observed that despite being based on a manga by CLAMP, Angelic Layer had "all the appearance of a game tie-in, just without a real game to tie into".
