= List of Chobits characters =

This is a list of characters from the manga and anime series Chobits by Clamp.

== Main characters ==
=== Hideki Motosuwa ===
Voiced by: Tomokazu Sugita (Japanese); Crispin Freeman (English)

Hideki Motosuwa (本須和 秀樹, Motosuwa Hideki) is a 19-year-old (18 in the anime) repeat student (ronin) attempting to get into a university by studying at Seki cram school, which his parents have sent him to. They have also severed his allowance, which means he has to work at Yorokonde (My Pleasure), an izakaya, to make ends meet. One night, while walking home from a convenience store, he finds a persocom lying in the trash outside his apartment building. He takes her home, and after much searching, switches her on and finds that the only word she can utter is "Chi". Because of this, he gives her the name "Chi" and takes her into his care, doing his best to protect and teach her.

Living in the country his entire life, Hideki has trouble adjusting to his new life in Tokyo. Due to this, he is prone to outbursts of confusion and frustration. Also, because of the time spent by himself on his family's farm (which in the anime is revealed to be in Hokkaidō), Hideki has a habit of thinking out loud and talking to himself which is a not infrequent source of comedy. He has an active libido, possessing many pornographic magazines which he refers to as "okazu" ("side dish"). (In the English manga translation, Chi refers to one of the magazines as a "tasty side dish"; in the anime's American translation, Chi refers to these magazines as "Hideki's yummies"). When he moves to Tokyo, Hideki desires a persocom so that he can finally surf the internet for pornography and he is not the only character who thinks this way. In fact Shinbo himself proudly admits that Plum is also equipped to perform these tasks when he first meets Hideki.

Despite his shortcomings and occasional moments of awkwardness with the bustling environment of Tokyo, Hideki is a genuinely kind and honest person, whose habit of thinking of others' well-being before his own can cause many problems. When a friend is in trouble, especially Chi, he is always there to help. Although many characters in the series often tease him for being a "nice guy", mostly by saying that is why he is a virgin, they turn to him for advice with their problems, knowing he will always hear them out and do his best to assist them.

In an extra 27th episode included on the Chobits anime DVD, it is shown that Hideki is finally admitted to college after studying for a year at the prep school.

=== Chi ===
Voiced by: Rie Tanaka (Japanese); Georgette Rose (English)

Chi (ちぃ, Chii) is a "chobit," a technologically advanced persocom rumored to possess true sapience, unlike other persocoms. She is found by Hideki one night in the trash, as he makes his way home from work. Her on-off switch is located in an unusual location. CLAMP has stated that this was done to create a major plot point. Upon Hideki finding the switch and turning her on, she is only able to say the word "chi," remembers nothing of her past life, and is unable to perform even simple tasks. Because of this, Hideki names her Chi and undertakes teaching her how to function. Because her system cannot be scanned by other persocoms, Minoru Kokubunji suggests she may be one of the legendary Chobits. Through the course of the series, Chi learns basic skills and eventually takes a job to help support Hideki.

As Chi and Hideki learn more about her, Chi begins to have visions of another persocom who is identical to herself. Hideki eventually learns that this is Freya, her twin, and that Chi was originally called Elda; after Freya fell in love and broke her heart, her memories were downloaded into Chi, before her system stopped. While Ms. Hibiya was telling Hideki about Chi's earlier life Freya was telling a simpler, less detailed, version of the same story to Chi.

During the series, Chi reads a series of children's picture books, A City with No People, about a character searching for the "person just for me," which were written pseudonymously by Chitose Hibiya as a way of reconnecting Chi to her past self as Elda, and to guide Chi's search for love. At the end of the series, Hideki finally admits that he loves Chi, and is her special person.

== Major supporting characters ==
=== Chitose Hibiya ===
Voiced by: Kikuko Inoue (Japanese); Ellen Wilkinson (English)

Chitose Hibiya (日比谷 千歳, Hibiya Chitose) is the landlady at the apartment where Hideki is staying. In the manga, she was previously an employee of Piffle Princess Enterprises and participated in the development of Angels and later, persocoms. She was married to the president of the company, the late Ichiro Mihara (a character from CLAMP's shared universe work Angelic Layer), who used the data gathered from the Angelic Layer research to create the Chobits to be Chitose's children, because she was unable to have children of her own. She also authors the A City with No People series of books to help Chi find the person just for her.

=== Hiromu Shinbo ===
Voiced by: Tomokazu Seki (Japanese); Tony Oliver (English)

Hiromu Shinbo (Note: Shinbo's name is spelled Shinbo on the Japanese Chobits website and in the English anime & manga, and is also pronounced identically (Japanese "n" is pronounced as "m" before bilabials such as "p" and "b").) (新保弘, Shinbo Hiromu) is Hideki's best friend and is also studying at Seki cram school. In the anime, Shinbo lives in the same apartment complex as Hideki and is his next-door neighbor. Shinbo is usually the first person Hideki turns to for help with persocoms. Shortly after beginning school he finds his teacher Takako Shimizu in a park late at night because she had been unwittingly locked out of her house by her husband, who was too busy with his persocom. He later falls in love and becomes her husband.

=== Plum ===
Voiced by: Motoko Kumai (Japanese); Sandy Fox (English)

Sumomo (Note: Plum is a direct translation of her Japanese name.) (すもも) is a miniature "mobile persocom"—the equivalent of a laptop computer. Wearing an outfit that makes her resemble a genie, she is programmed to be cute and tends to be quite hyperactive, for example leading Hideki in wakeup exercises each morning and dancing when she is in standby mode. Shinbo was the original owner of Plum, but left her with Hideki after leaving with Takako. He later transfers Plum's registration to Hideki, giving him permanent ownership. At the beginning of the series, Shinbo uses Plum in an attempt to analyze Chi, and Plum is nearly broken in the process, requiring new main memory, and in the manga, a new video card as well. Once Kotoko joined Hideki, she quickly came to the conclusion that Plum was mad, with her nonsensical ways.

=== Minoru Kokubunji / M ===
Voiced by: Houko Kuwashima (Japanese); Mona Marshall (English)

Minoru Kokubunji (国分寺 稔, Kokubunji Minoru) is a wealthy twelve-year-old genius whose specialty is persocoms. In particular, he has built a custom persocom named Yuzuki, designed to look like his late sister, and has given her self-teaching software, meaning that she can learn things on her own instead of having to have programs loaded into her as is the case with most persocoms.

For the most part, Minoru is a very reserved and very gentle individual who surrounds himself with persocoms. His curiosity over Chi's origins leads to him becoming one of Hideki Motosuwa's closest friends. Minoru does what he can to help his friends whether it be technological help, such as tracking things down or allowing Hideki to make video phone calls, or advice on relationships with persocoms. Although he is known for being calm and collected most of the time, Minoru's attitude completely changes when Yuzuki is present. Similar to Hideki's behavior toward Chi, Minoru is very protective of Yuzuki and is prone to outbursts whenever she is in trouble. He is also very forgiving, always comforting her on the fact that it is never her fault if something goes wrong.

Minoru is also known as "M" on the bulletin boards, where he is considered one of the leading experts in the field of persocom development. Minoru's late sister is Kaede Saito, a character from Angelic Layer.

=== Yuzuki ===
Voiced by: Fumiko Orikasa (Japanese); Karen Strassman (English)

Yuzuki (柚姫) is a custom-built persocom created by Minoru Kokubunji roughly two years before the start of the series. She is very tall with long braids and blue hair. Her main outfit is a maid's uniform and at times outdoor civilian clothing. Yuzuki was created to resemble, physically and mentally, Minoru's late sister, Kaede, who had died from an illness two years earlier and has given her self-teaching software, meaning that she can learn things on her own instead of having to have programs loaded into her as is the case with most persocoms. Yuzuki is programmed with all of the data that Minoru could remember about his sister; what she liked, what she disliked, as well as her habits and behaviors. However, Minoru still realizes that no matter how realistic she may be, she is still only a persocom that is following her programming. Yuzuki also possesses an awareness of her own limitations, although she doesn't share it when conversing with Yumi and Yumi has told of her own feelings of limitation with respect to persocoms.

Yuzuki is shown to have good interaction with other persocoms around her. She is very sweet to Chi when they first met and even helps her learn along the way. To Yuzuki's surprise, Chi even helps her discover her true feelings for Minoru and thanks her for it.

It is shown in the manga that Yuzuki can also be very insecure. She always worries that she is not perfect enough for Minoru, just like how Yumi feels she cannot compare to a persocom.

Yuzuki, like every other persocom, was incapacitated twice in the story when Chi is in danger. After one of those Minoru asks what she experienced while she was incapacitated.

Toward the end of the anime and manga, Yuzuki loses a large portion of Kaede's personality data as a result of trying to hack into Zima and being counter-hacked by Dita. However, Minoru declines to reenter this data, because he has grown to love Yuzuki for who she is; because she is Yuzuki, rather than because she is a replacement for his sister.

=== Yumi Oumura ===
Voiced by: Megumi Toyoguchi (Japanese); Julie Maddalena (English)

Yumi Oumura (Note: Yumi's last name is spelled "Omura" on the Japanese website and in the English anime release.) (大村 裕美, Ōmura Yumi) is a seventeen-year-old girl who works at the Japanese pub called My Pleasure alongside Hideki. In the anime, she is the daughter of the club's owner, but in the manga, she is only an employee. It is initially implied that Yumi is interested in a relationship with Hideki, but as the series progresses it is revealed that she initially approached him because he also worked at My Pleasure, and that she thinks of him as an older brother. Throughout most of the series Yumi has an inferiority complex toward persocoms, and becomes upset at any mention of a human-sized persocom. However, she does carry a small persocom, shaped like a rabbit, on a key chain that can only do basic functions. In the manga she says that she has a larger persocom, also shaped like a rabbit, at home. In one episode of the anime it is revealed that one of those functions is a cell phone, which is later used by Chi to determine her location.

The reason for her inferiority complex is that while Yumi was working at Chiroru she fell in love with the manager, Hiroyasu Ueda. She gathered the courage to tell him, and found out that he reciprocated her feelings. However, Yumi later discovered that Ueda had previously been married to a persocom that he had named Yumi and she thought that he would compare her to the persocom Yumi and find her inferior. However, Hideki eventually manages to persuade Yumi that Hiroyasu would not have started anything if he did not love Yumi for who she was, and he and Yumi resume their relationship.

=== Takako Shimizu ===
Voiced by: Ryoka Yuzuki (Japanese); Wendee Lee (English)

Takako Shimizu (清水 多香子, Shimizu Takako) is Hideki and Shinbo's teacher at the Seki cram school. Like Yumi, Shimizu has had a negative experience with persocoms. Her husband bought a persocom, and eventually she became unimportant to him compared to the persocom. He spent more and more time with it until he forgot about his wife completely, locking her out of the house one night because he was so enamored with it. Because of this, Shimizu is no longer able to trust human men. In the end, she returns to the cram school, married to Shinbo.

=== Hiroyasu Ueda ===
Voiced by: Yuji Ueda (Japanese); David Lucas (English)

Hiroyasu Ueda (植田 弘康, Ueda Hiroyasu) is the owner of Chiroru, a local bakery which Yumi (and in the manga, Hideki) once worked in and which Chi ends up working at. He is 39 years old, although he looks as though he is only in his mid-20s, at one point noting jokingly that he has a "baby face".

He too has suffered a trauma involving persocoms. When he first opened his bakery, he bought a persocom to help with math and accounting, which he admits he is terrible at. He eventually fell in love with this persocom and then married her, but she developed a hard disk fault which resulted in the gradual degradation of her memory, until she remembered almost nothing at all.

Rarely, she would suddenly recall small fragments of memories from her life with Hiroyasu. He could not bring himself to have her repaired because her memories might be lost completely in the process of transferring them to a new hard drive, and he felt she would not be the same person if this happened. Soon, her memory degraded to the point that she could not remember anything for more than a few seconds at a time, and Hiroyasu had to keep a constant watch on her to prevent her from wandering away. One night while walking with his persocom, Hiroyasu, lost in thought, walked into the middle of the street, unaware of an oncoming truck. In a final moment of clarity, his persocom pushed him out of the way and was herself run over. Her last word to Hiroyasu was "Konnichiwa"; the default greeting for a newly activated persocom with no memories.

Hiroyasu and Yumi Oumura were in love in the past, but broke up when Yumi quit her job at the bakery after discovering that the persocom he was previously married to was named Yumi and feared she could never live up to the other Yumi. Through the help of Chi and Hideki, he and Yumi resume their relationship.

== Minor characters ==
=== Freya ===
Voiced by: Rie Tanaka (Japanese); Georgette Rose (English)

Freya (フレイヤ, Fureiya) was the first Chobit, who was created before Elda by Hibiya's husband, Ichiro Mihara. Freya was created to be Hibiya's daughter because she was unable to have children of her own. Freya's development was kept secret from Hibiya; she did not know of Freya's existence until she was called down to the lab one day without explanation. Upon awakening for the very first time, she was given the name Freya by Hibiya.

Freya lived happily with the Mihara couple for a time until Hibiya noticed that her attitude was becoming increasingly melancholy with no explanation as to why. At this point, Hibiya asked her husband to build a little sister for Freya in an attempt to make her happy again. From this request, Elda was created. Freya was happy to have a little sister and, for a time, seemed to be acting normally, although, as Hibiya would later tell Hideki in the anime, "there were still these odd times when she looked as though she was thinking very deeply about something."

Some time after, Freya suddenly lost consciousness and collapsed to the ground. In the anime, the impetus for this event was witnessing her mother and father flirting with each other in the compound's courtyard. It was only then that Hibiya finally realized the source of Freya's sadness; she had fallen in love with her own father, Mihara. Freya knew that her father still loved his wife and did not want to disturb their happiness, so she pained her heart with efforts to suppress her feelings. Over time, her pain became so great that she began to malfunction under the strain of her emotional burden. Freya was no longer able to move and was bedridden from that point on. Toward the end, she could not lift a finger or even shift her focus and began to suffer from memory loss.

In the anime, Freya never found the courage to tell her father how she truly felt; in the manga, she resigns herself to the fact that because of the damage to her body, all hope is lost regardless of the outcome, and chooses to tell him her true feelings. Eventually Freya's pain became so unbearable that she chose to self-terminate rather than continue to exist. Before this could happen, Elda offered to take Freya's heart into her own so that she would not disappear completely and so that her memories would be preserved. In the anime, nobody knew that Elda had taken in Freya's heart; conversely, in the manga, both Hibiya and Mihara learned of this only moments after it occurred.

Now that Elda has become Chi, Freya does everything she can to ensure that Chi will find the person just for her. Freya comforts Chi when she is in distress, guides her to understand her feelings for Hideki, and intervenes when she is in danger.

=== Yoshiyuki Kojima / Dragonfly ===
Voiced by: Jun'ichi Suwabe (Japanese); Terrence Stone (English)

Known in online circles as "Dragonfly", Yoshiyuki Kojima (小島 良由起, Kojima Yoshiyuki) is an ego-driven custom persocom-builder and a man willing to overlook scruples to learn more about building better persocoms. Unlike Minoru Kokubunji, he is more obsessed with persocoms and even kidnaps Chi during the course of the story. He attempts to hack into Chi, using all of his persocoms in a massive parallel processing network. During this time, he makes an ill-advised attempt to sexually molest Chi, and Freya takes over, restraining him with all of the cords attached to her. She then attacks him with a concussion blast, blowing out the windows in his house and knocking him unconscious. Afterwards, he is seen assisting Minoru to help solve the mystery of Chi and the Chobits. He mentions that Chi "is too interesting a safe not to try and crack!" Because of these events, Hideki feels uncomfortable in his presence. Yoshiyuki is the original owner of Kotoko.

=== Kotoko ===
Voiced by: Yukana (Japanese); Kari Wahlgren (English)

Kotoko (琴子) is a laptop-sized persocom, like Plum, but, she told Chi, "I am desktop powerful." She was custom-built by Yoshiyuki and has much higher specifications than Plum. Kotoko originally belonged to Yoshiyuki, but following Chi's kidnapping, Hideki and Shinbo force Yoshiyuki to transfer ownership of Kotoko to Hideki so that her memories of Yoshiyuki kidnapping Chi cannot be erased. Kotoko is far more serious than Plum and thinks that everyone in the Motosuwa household is crazy, Plum in particular. Kotoko's specialty is research, which twice drives the story forward. Kotoko is also programmed to always tell the truth, no matter what, even when it works to her owner's disadvantage. She is serious and cynical, except when researching something, to the point of being tsundere.

=== Zima ===
Voiced by: Isshin Chiba (Japanese); Kirk Thornton (English)

Zima (ジーマ, Jīma) is one of two government persocoms who are looking for Chi and is the Japanese government's national data bank which all persocoms are connected to. During the course of the series an attempt is made by Yuzuki to hack into him to gain information concerning Chi. In the anime, Zima remarks that he and Dita were created from the same basic system architecture that Chi is, rendering them immune to her ability to immobilize persocoms. This does not appear to be the case in the manga.

Zima and Dita have been assigned to prevent Chi from executing her final program as it is believed that the program would destroy the person-recognition abilities of all persocoms. The manga and anime differ on what would cause the final program to execute. It executes in a preliminary way twice during the story when Chi is in danger. Zima, however, believes that this will resolve in a good way and does not want to take action against Chi. He believes that if Chi can find her own happy ending, he can have happiness with Dita. He loves Dita but she does not understand this because she thinks that persocoms are unable to have anything considered to be true feelings. He lies to Dita about Chi's whereabouts and stalls as long as possible before finally going to stop her. However, upon arriving Zima physically restrains Dita from attacking Chi.

In the anime, Zima is referred to as "The King of Persocoms".

=== Dita ===
Voiced by: Yuka Tokumitsu (Japanese); Dorothy Elias-Fahn (English)

Dita (ディタ) Dita is one of the two persocoms looking for Chi. Her role is to protect Zima both physically and as a pro-active firewall protection program, hacking into any persocom who poses a threat to Zima. In the manga, she is also a government persocom assigned to protect the nation's databank, Zima. The anime adaptation though drops the government connection. She is observed by Zima in the manga as having a temper, even if her program does not recognize it as such. Dita appears to show feelings for Zima, but constantly denies it believing that persocoms cannot or should not experience such feelings. Towards the end of the series, Zima disables Dita when she tries to go after Chi to stop her program from running. Upon awakening asking what happened, she is told by Zima that "this fairytale had a happy ending". The two are last seen holding each other as presumptive lovers after a final small resistance by Dita, who again tries to deny her feelings.
