= Chobits =

Japanese manga series by Clamp

- Volume 1 tankōbon cover, featuring Chi

ちょびっツ (Chobittsu)
- Genre: Romantic comedy; Science fiction
- Manga
- Written by: Clamp
- Published by: Kodansha
- English publisher: AUS: Madman Entertainment (expired); NA: Kodansha Comics
- Imprint: Young Magazine KC
- Magazine: Weekly Young Magazine
- Original run: September 2000 – October 2002
- Volumes: 8
- Anime television series
- Directed by: Morio Asaka
- Produced by: Tatsuya Ono; Yuichi Sekido; Tetsuo Genshō
- Music by: Keitarō Takanami
- Studio: Madhouse
- Licensed by: AUS: Madman Entertainment; NA: Geneon Entertainment (expired) Crunchyroll; UK: MVM Films (expired)
- Original network: TBS
- English network: SEA: Animax Asia; US: Funimation Channel
- Original run: 2 April 2002 – 24 September 2002
- Episodes: 27 + OVA

Chobits (Japanese: ちょびっツ, Hepburn: Chobittsu) is a Japanese manga series written and illustrated by the Japanese manga collective Clamp. It was serialized in Kodansha's seinen manga magazine Weekly Young Magazine from September 2000 to October 2002, with its chapters collected in eight bound volumes. Chobits was adapted as a 26-episode-long anime television series broadcast on TBS from April to September 2002. In addition, it has spawned two video games as well as various merchandise such as model figures, collectible cards, calendars, and artbooks.

The series tells the story of Hideki Motosuwa, a college student who finds an abandoned personal computer (パーソナルコンピュータ pāsonaru konpyūta) or "persocom" (パソコン) with an anthro-human form, which he names "Chi" after the only word it initially can speak. As the series progresses, they explore the mysteries of Chi's origin together and questions about the relationship between human beings and computers. The manga is set in the same universe as Angelic Layer, taking place a few years after the events of that story, and like Angelic Layer, it explores the relationship between humans and electronic devices shaped like human beings. Chobits branches off as a crossover into many other stories in different ways, such as Tsubasa: Reservoir Chronicle, xxxHolic and Kobato.

In North America, the manga was licensed for an English-language release by Tokyopop in 2002 and was re-released by Dark Horse Comics in 2009 and later, Kodansha Comics in 2020. The anime series was licensed by Geneon in 2002 and re-licensed by Funimation in 2010.

== Plot ==
The series centers on the life of Hideki Motosuwa, a held-back student attempting to qualify for university by studying at Seki prep school in Tokyo. Besides a girlfriend, he dreams of having a persocom (パソコン): an android used as a personal computer, which is expensive. On his way home one evening, he stumbles across a persocom in the form of a beautiful girl with floor-length hair lying against a pile of trash bags, and he carries her home, not noticing that a disk fell on the ground. Upon turning her on, she instantly regards Hideki with adoration. The only word the persocom seems capable of saying is "chi" (ちぃ, Chii), thus he names her that. Hideki assumes that there must be something wrong with her, and so the following morning he has his neighbor Hiromu Shinbo analyze her with his mobile persocom Sumomo. After Sumomo crashes during the attempt they conclude that she must be custom-built.

Shinbo introduces Hideki to Minoru Kokubunji, a twelve-year-old prodigy who specializes in the field of custom-built persocoms. Minoru's persocoms, including Yuzuki, a fairly exceptional custom-built persocom, are not able to analyze Chi either, and thus they conclude that she may be one of the Chobits, a legendary series of persocoms rumoured to have free will and emotions. Although this is a possibility, Minoru is confident that it is only rumour. Yuzuki also adds that she does not resemble any persocom model in any available database and so she must be custom made after all.

A major part of the plot involves Hideki attempting to teach Chi words, concepts, and appropriate behaviours, in between his crammed schedule of school and work. At the same time, Chi seems to be developing feelings for Hideki, at an emotional depth she is not supposed to possess, and Hideki struggles with his feelings for her. The need to figure out more about Chi and her mysterious functions and past becomes a pull for the characters in the series.

Hideki's feelings intensify for Chi regardless of her being a persocom and despite his friends' painful experiences involving other persocoms. Chi becomes aware of her purpose through a picture book series called A City with No People which she finds in a bookstore. The books speak about many different things involving human and persocom relationships: persocoms and their convenience as friends and lovers, how there are things that they cannot do and questioning whether a relationship between a persocom and a human is really one-sided. It also speaks about the Chobits series; that they are different from other persocoms, and what they are incapable of doing unlike other persocoms. These picture books awaken Chi's other self, her sibling Freya who is aware of their past and helps Chi realize what she must do when she decides who her "person just for me" is. Together, Chi and Hideki explore the relationship between human beings and persocoms, as well as their friends' and their own.

== Production ==
Clamp—a creative team consisting of Satsuki Igarashi, Ageha Ohkawa, Tsubaki Nekoi and Mokona—wrote and illustrated Chobits, which is the first of their manga to be targeted towards older male readers (seinen manga). The idea for Chobits originated from the group's experiences with computers, which would present indecipherable error messages when experiencing difficulties, to which they added a "sexier spin" to the concept. After completing their previous manga series Cardcaptor Sakura, the group successfully pitched Chobits to the Japanese manga magazine Weekly Young Magazine. Clamp completed fourteen pages per week for Chobits's weekly serialization, totaling fifty-six pages a month. The title of the manga has its origins in "Chobi", the name of a cat at the place of Nekoi's former employment, which the group made into "Chobits", as the characters Elda and Freya were twins.

Ohkawa designed Hideki and Chi first. Chi's design as a personal computer resulted from Ohkawa's wish to increase the sense of "emotional discomfort" around becoming emotionally involved with something considered to be merely a lifeless machine. The characterization of the protagonist Hideki proved to be difficult for her; in the beginning, she considered an "aloof" man who gradually warms up emotionally or a sex-obsessed man. She decided that neither characterization would be a good fit for Chi and settled on one of a penniless and benevolent student. In keeping with the conventions of the romantic comedy genre, the group had planned to introduce conventional characters, such as an older female neighbor and a physically attractive friend from childhood; in the case of Chobits, the "childhood friend" never appeared. The artwork was done in ballpoint pen to evoke the sense of "rough" lines, and colored pages were done in acrylic gouache.

== Media ==
=== Manga ===
Chobits began as a manga written and illustrated by Clamp, a collective of four Japanese manga artists. It appeared as a serial in the seinen manga magazine Weekly Young Magazine from the 43rd issue for 2000 to the 48th issue for 2002. Kodansha compiled the eighty-eight chapters into eight bound volumes and published them from February 14, 2001, to November 29, 2002.

In 2002, Tokyopop licensed Chobits for an English-language translation in North America and marketed it as part of its new unflipped manga line, which reads from right-to-left. Previously, translated manga was typically flipped from its original reading order to a left-to-right one to better suit Western readers. Tokyopop published the series from April 23, 2002, to October 7, 2003, and its translation was distributed in Australia and New Zealand by Madman Entertainment. Tokyopop's license concluded in 2009. At the 2009 San Diego Comic-Con, Dark Horse Manga announced an omnibus edition of the series in celebration of Clamp's 10th anniversary. In 2010, it published the two volumes on March 24, and September 29, respectively.

After Dark Horse Comics' license expired, Kodansha USA Publishing announced its publication in 2019 under the Kodansha Classics line. Chobits 20th Anniversary Edition was announced in 2020.

Chobits is also published in Hong Kong in Traditional Chinese by Jonesky, in Singapore in Simplified Chinese by Chuang Yi, in South Korea by Daiwon C.I., in France by Pika Édition, in Spain by Norma Editorial, in Mexico by Grupo Editorial Vid, in Italy by Star Comics (which serialized it in Express), in Germany by Egmont Manga & Anime (which serialized it in Manga Power), in Poland by Japonica Polonica Fantastica, in Brazil by JBC, and in Sweden by Carlsen Verlag.

An artbook based on the series, titled Your Eyes Only, was published by Kodansha; it was licensed in North America by Tokyopop. In addition, A City with No People, the fictional picture book written in the series by Chitose Hibiya, was released in Japan as a picture book;

=== Anime ===
An animated adaptation of Chobits was produced by Madhouse, Tokyo Broadcasting System, Pioneer LDC and Movic and directed by Morio Asaka, with Hisashi Abe designing the characters and Keitarō Takanami composing the music. The series was broadcast in 26 episodes from 2 April 2002 to 24 September 2002 on TBS. It was later released on 8 DVDs. The original episodes 9 and 18 are "recap" episodes, summarizing previous events. These episodes were re-numbered for the DVD release as episodes 8.5 and 16.5, respectively, and removed from their original sequence by being published together on the final DVD. As a result, the series is 24 episodes long on DVD. In addition, there are two DVD-only OVAs: a 27th episode recapping the series (numbered episode 24.5) and a 6-minute special, "Chobits: Plum and Kotoko Deliver". The opening theme is "Let Me Be With You" by Round Table featuring Nino. The ending themes are "Raison d'être" (Reason to Be) by Rie Tanaka (episodes 1–13), "Ningyo-hime" (Mermaid Princess) by Rie Tanaka (episodes 14–25), and "Katakoto no Koi" (Awkward Love) by Rie Tanaka and Tomokazu Sugita (episode 26). The ending theme for the OVA is "Book End Bossa" by Round Table featuring Nino.

Chobits was licensed in North America by Geneon in July 2002, which has released the series in 7 DVDs. This release is redistributed in the United Kingdom (on 6 DVDs instead of 7, placing the recap episodes and special as extras on disk 6) by MVM Films, and in Australia and New Zealand by Madman Entertainment. At Anime Boston 2010, North American anime distributor Funimation announced that they license rescued Chobits and would release the series on DVD and Blu-ray on April 26, 2011, and May 10, 2011, respectively. The anime series made its US television debut on May 9, 2011, on the Funimation Channel.

The series is also licensed in Taiwan by Proware Multimedia, in France and the Netherlands by Kazé, in Germany by ADV Films and later Kaze Germany, and in Russia by MC Entertainment. The series was broadcast in Korea by AniOne TV, in France by Europe 2 TV, in Spain by both Animax España and Buzz Channel, in Portugal on Animax Portugal, and in Poland by Hyper.

=== Soundtracks ===
Two soundtracks from the anime were released by Pioneer. Chobits Original Soundtrack 001 was released 1 July 2003 and Chobits Original Soundtrack 002 was released 7 October 2003. Three singles were released, the opening theme "Let Me Be with You" by Round Table featuring Nino, and two ending themes by Rie Tanaka, "Raison d'être" and "Ningyo Hime". In addition, a character song album, Chobits Character Song Collection, was released on 17 February 2004.

One piece of music in the anime nicknamed "Dark Chi's Theme" by fans (because it appears in "Freya mode") appears on the Best of Chobits soundtrack. Original name of the track is "Fuuma (Dialogue Mix)" and "Kamui (Dialogue Mix)", which are available on their respective singles "Fuuma" Single and "Kamui" Single from the X soundtrack.

=== Video games ===
In 2002 Marvelous Entertainment released in Japan only a Chobits game for the Nintendo Game Boy Advance called Chobits: Atashi Dake no Hito. The game was available bundled with a clear blue Game Boy Advance with a decal of Chi above the A+B buttons and a Chobits logo above the D-pad.

In 2003 Broccoli released a Sony PlayStation 2 game titled Chobits: Chii Dake no Hito, a Bishōjo visual novel. Like the Game Boy Advance game, this too was released only in Japan.

Another PC-version game was also released in 2002, using Macromedia and QuickTime as the background support. This game is called Communication Game, in which the player can "talk" with Chi and teach her to speak. It also contained some small games inside such as a keyboard typing game.

== Reception ==
Reviews have been mixed. Shaenon K. Garrity of Anime News Network criticized the series' description of persocoms as "obedient" and "perfect," writing, "The persocoms are perfect women, stripped clean of everything that makes real women less than perfect servants to men—that is, one might say, everything that makes women human." The adaptation was criticized for shifting the focus from Hideki to Chi, in particular for having episodes devoted to Chi "doing cute things" and providing fanservice. Helen McCarthy in 500 Essential Anime Movies stated that the OVA's main strength is "its questioning of how we use technology, and whether it can be a substitute, rather than a support, for real life".

The Encyclopedia of Science Fiction described Chobits as a good but flawed anime that engages with questions about people's relationships with technology, particularly its potential to substitute artificial companionship for relationships with other people. It criticized the series' depiction of the predominantly female persocoms as adolescent male wish-fulfilment figures who are obedient, non-threatening and sexually available, arguing that this sits uneasily with a work that otherwise appears interested in interrogating such attitudes. The encyclopedia noted that a critique of male fantasies can be inferred but is rarely made explicit, comparing this ambiguity unfavourably with The Stepford Wives. It also considered the first half of the series burdened by "cringe" elements and fan service, while noting that the original manga treated its themes more seriously and in greater depth.
