= List of Gun X Sword episodes =

Gun X Sword
- Cover of the first DVD volume
- No. of episodes: 26

Release
- Original network: TV Tokyo
- Original release: July 4 – December 26, 2005

Gun Sword is a 2005 Japanese anime series produced by AIC A.S.T.A, written by Hideyuki Kurata, and directed by Gorō Taniguchi. The series aired on TV Tokyo from July 4 to December 26, 2005, totaling 26 episodes. The series was licensed for North America by Geneon Entertainment, who produced an English dub overseen by New Generation Pictures. The dub is also available in Australia from Madman Entertainment and in the United Kingdom by MVM Films. At Anime Central 2010, North American anime distributor Funimation announced that they have rescued Gun X Sword and re-released the series in late 2010.

The opening theme is "GUNXSWORD" by Kōtarō Nakagawa while the ending themes are "A Rising Tide" by Shuntarō Okino (episodes 1 to 8, 10, 12 to 16, 18 to 21, 23, 25), "Paradiso" by Hitomi (episodes 9 and 11), "S.O.S" by Kikuko Inoue, Houko Kuwashima, Satsuki Yukino & Saeko Chiba (episode 17), "A Rising Tide" (acoustic version) by Shuntaro Okino (episode 22), "Calling You" by Shuntaro Okino (episode 24), and "GUNXSWORD" (starting again) by Kotaro Nakagawa and Ondekoza (episode 26). The insert songs are "Niji no Kanata" by Satsuki Yukino (episode 3) and "La Speranza" by Hitomi (episodes 16, 25).

== Episode list ==
No.	Title	Original release date
1	"Tuxedo Blowing in the Wind"; Transliteration: "Takishīdo wa Kaze ni Mau" (Japanese: タキシードは風に舞う)	5 July 2005
On the verge of starvation, Van, sporting a tuxedo and cowboy hat, enters a church looking for food, but he encounters some thieves after a 12-year-old girl named Wendy Garret. After being rescued, Wendy graciously brings him back to her town of Evergreen, where she treats him to lunch. It is explained that Evergreen is under siege by a gang called the Wild Bunch led by their boss, Lucky Roulette. Van declines to help, but Wendy persistently chases after him, even offering to be his bride. Lucky later attacks the town with his armor. Van finally summons his armor, Dann, after Wendy is threatened and Lucky attacks Van dishonorably – from behind. After Van defeats Lucky Roulette, Van and Wendy confront Lucky on the whereabouts of Michael Garret, Wendy's brother. Lucky says he sold Michael to a man with a claw on his right hand a week past, but doesn't know where they are now. The next day, when Van leaves to continue his search for The Claw, Wendy informs him she is joining him because she intends to rescue her brother. Nothing Van can say will convince her otherwise. Whether he likes it or not (and he doesn't), he has a companion.
2	"Funny Stream"; Transliteration: "Fanī Sutorīmu" (Japanese: ファニーストリーム)	12 July 2005
Van and Wendy enter a town on a long bridge called Bridge City. While staying at a hotel, Van meets an old friend nicknamed Carmen 99, who offers her services as an information broker. They find out that the gate has been closed for the past few days, not allowing the residents to cross the bridge, due to construction. It is later realized that Baron Mayor, the major of the town, is building an immense armor while under the guise of repairing the bridge. He captures two hundred women as slaves for his utopian nation, among them are Wendy and Carmen 99. Van comes and fights off Baron and his minions, while Wendy and Carmen 99 guide the women outside. Baron then summons his armor called the Metal Glow. Van summons Dann and fights until Metal Glow appears to defeat Dann with a massive cannon shot. In reality, Van was waiting for such an attack to reveal Metal Glow's power source and he uses Dann's 'defeat' to draw the Baron in where Dann can strike, destroying Metal Glow.
3	"Heroes One More Time"; Transliteration: "Yuusha wa Futatabi" (Japanese: 勇者は再び)	19 July 2005
Van and Wendy make their entrance to the desert town of Gloria at a local restaurant and bar called The Pink Amigo with Van being dragged by Wendy after he evidently passed out from hunger. The Pink Amigo is now owned by Yukiko Steavens who inherited it from her grandmother. The 'old timers' Nero, Josè, Carlos, and Barrio are introduced as the four surviving members of a five armor rider team who had protected the town long ago with their armor called the Eldorado. They can tend to get loud and obnoxious in their reminiscing of the 'old days' which annoys the younger generation who don't believe the tales. Yukiko often calms them down with her singing voice, reminding them of her deceased grandmother, Chizuru Steavens, the missing fifth member of The El Dorado Five. When Van introduces himself as "Steel Van" they recognize him and that he is an armor rider and so 'adopt' him as 'one of them'. Later, after the four are imprisoned for reckless behavior, a mad scientist named Bucchi suddenly attacks the town with armor he invented. Van seems willing to turn his back and let it happen. The four are released when the jail becomes endangered and immediately go to reclaim their own armors. It is quickly evident that the individual armors are no match for Bucchi's, so they combine to form the humanoid El Dorado. But without the fifth component -- Chizuru's energy booster pack -- they are still no match against Bucchi's modern armor. Finally Van uses Dann to quietly launch the fifth component to join the El Dorado. Once all five are joined, El Dorado defeats Bucchi's armor and saves the town. In the process, the "old-timers" get a chance to relive the glory days and prove to the younger generation that they really were heroes all along.
4	"And the Rain Kept Falling"; Transliteration: "Soshite, Ame wa Furiyuku" (Japanese: そして、雨は降りゆく)	26 July 2005
While traveling through a forest, Van rescues Wendy from being harassed by a thug piloting a small armor, and very shortly afterwards collapses with a high fever. Wendy manages to drag the unconscious Van to a cave and where, in the process of nursing him, she discovers a strange symbol on Van's abdomen. As his fever worsens through the night, she determines that she needs to hurry to the nearest town to get help. She is able to get medicine from a disabled doctor and kind nurse at a private clinic called the Denehee Clinic. While she is gone, Van's fever breaks and though still weak, he manages to summon his armor (which lands an unfortunate distance away forcing him to travel to it) which has the ability to heal him, but at the cost of time spent dreaming about the wedding and his bride's death at the hand of The Claw. Meanwhile, Wendy's hurried return through the forest is interrupted by a boar which prompts her own remembrance of how she received her brother's gun and how she first met Van. She returns to the cave to find Van gone, and while she is despairing his absence, the thug from earlier returns with friends looking for payback. They are more than willing to take it out on her. Van makes a sudden reappearance, in Dann, just in time to save Wendy from the thugs, and then, without Dann, confronts Wendy about her own disappearance. She tells of trying to take care of him, offering the bag of medicine, then collapses against him. She wakes in the cave next to a cozy fire, surprised to be covered with Van's tuxedo jacket as he stares into the bag of medicine. He tells her again she should go home, and then tells her to go back to sleep, ending the conversation by -- deliberately -- calling her by name and wishing her "pleasant dreams." Back at Denehee Clinic, a knock at the door interrupts the doctor's musing over the drawing Wendy made of Van's mark. At the door is a dangerous looking blonde man in a white coat asking about a man with a clawed hand.
5	"Twin's Guards"; Transliteration: "Tsuinzu Gādo" (Japanese: ツインズガード)	2 August 2005
Van and Wendy find themselves to a city inside a ravine ruled by identical twin sisters who hate each other. The twins fight to claim their deceased father's inheritance all for themselves. Carmen 99 meets up with Van and informs him that he can get information about The Claw if he becomes one side's bodyguard and does battle with another hired gun to determine the winner between the two sisters. Van is hired by R Driver, and another man named Ray Lundgren is hired by her sister L Driver. After a few initial hostilities, Van discovers that Ray, likewise, is hunting the Claw for exactly the same reason, but Ray's desire for revenge has turned him cold, heartless and determined to succeed at any cost whether it be to himself or others. During their supposed match, Ray steals the key of the inheritance, finding out that the father had used various twin test subjects for a dual piloted armor. The twins, having both gone rather insane, then take the armor. Realizing the deal has gone south, Carmen 99 finds and takes two golden decorations set with large colored stones as compensation for her trouble, and escapes with Wendy leaving Van to take care of himself. Fearing the destruction the twin could wreak in their armor, Van summons Dann but tries reasoning with the twins first. Ray has no such compulsion, and after summoning his armor, he strikes decisively and violently destroying the armor with the twins still in it despite Van's interference. Van emerges from the smoking crater alone to rejoin Wendy and Carmen 99, who then takes off leaving the two of them to continue their trek across the desert.
6	"Light My Fire"; Transliteration: "Hāto ni Hi o Tsukete" (Japanese: ハートに火をつけて)	9 August 2005
Van and Wendy continue onto a port town called Harbor Parade. Two lawless lovebirds, nicknamed Muscat and Honey Cherry, try to finance their wedding by repeatedly attempting to steal Van's armor, but their intended prey becomes their heroic rescuer when a mafia boss named Tony comes looking for a piece of the action. It is revealed that Tony is actually Honey Cherry's father and that her real name is Bunny Montana. Tony is enraged that Muscat, whose real name is Klatt, remodeled his 'armor' into a green and pink car named the Love Deluxe. Disgraced by the defilement, Tony initially asks Honey Cherry to kill Muscat, but Wendy urges Van to help, and so he comes to the rescue. Confronted by Van, Tony summons his own 'armor' and Van realized what passes for armor in Tony's mind is a tricked out car - tricked to the hilt and impressive, but no match for the real thing. Van easily defeats Tony's 'armor', and the couple decides to sell what remains of Tony's car to pay for their wedding.
7	"Vengeance Within"; Transliteration: "Fukushū suru wa Ware ni Ari" (Japanese: 復讐するは我にあり)	16 August 2005
Thieves maroon Van and Wendy on a remote island where a mysterious man of great wealth, named Joe Lutz, welcomes them into his palatial estate until another boat passes the island in ten days. Although the two feel that there is something eerie about him, they have no choice but to accept his hospitality. Joe is nothing but friendly and caring as he makes the two feel at home, offering quiet counsel and using his vast resources to aid them in their quest to track the Claw, giving his guests hope that their stay will not put them too far behind. Even the suspicious Van finds himself coming to appreciate Joe's compassion and opens up about his quest for the claw handed man and the reason. With 'been there, did that' reasoning, Joe tries to convince Van that even if he were to succeed, Van would find his victory hollow and he asks Van if this violent quest would be something Van's wife would condone. Separately Joe has also convinces Wendy that it is obvious The Claw never intended to kill Michael and that she would be wiser to return to Evergreen where Michael would know where to look for her once the Claw releases him. The man is smooth and convincing, and it appears his gentle approach is effectively separating the two seekers and derailing their intent to continue, but after some deep soul searching Van figures out exactly what Joe is doing. Discovered, Joe reveals his true colors, summoning his armor - the Golden Cradle. Van summons his armor and the resulting destruction sends the inhabitants of the island fleeing for their lives. The Golden Cradle is powerful, but Joe hasn't Van's skill and cunning, and Joe is defeated. Kneeling at Dann's feet, Joe offers one last sacrifice to the friend he is working for - The Claw -- and sacrificially detonates his armor, but when the smoke clears, Dann is still standing. Resuming their journey, Van realizes it has just gotten harder - the Claw has friends and he knows Van is coming after him, but his resolve remains unshaken, and when he asks, Wendy remains committed as well.
8	"Bound By Blood"; Transliteration: "Sono Kizuna ni Yō ga Aru" (Japanese: その絆に用がある)	23 August 2005
An armor resembling a dragon attacks Van and Wendy while they traverse through a mountainous path. An obnoxious boy named Joshua Lundgren tries to help them but causes more harm than good. Ray, later recognized to be Joshua's brother, shows up in his armor called the Vulcan, forcing the dragon armor to retreat. Wendy empathizes with Joshua seeing that he's trying to find his brother – at least the kind and gentle one Ray once was – much like she is. Meanwhile, Van and Ray meet again at a restaurant in town, where Ray reveals a plan to defeat the dragon armor if Van will help. It requires Van to hold the dragon immobile while Ray shoots at what he perceives as its weak point. Back in town, Joshua reveals himself to be an expert on armor, having had a close relationship with Ray's wife Shino, who worked on an experimental lab that designed armors. He realizes there is a vulnerability that can be exploited that Ray is unaware of. Wendy and Joshua run back to the mountain to tell the armor riders, but Ray won't listen. Luckily, Van does and the information enables them to stop the dragon armor. They discover pilot inside the dragon armor is long dead and the thing has been running on auto pilot. Van also discovers a data disk and prevents Ray from taking it away. Wendy invites Joshua to join them, but he declines. A short time later, however, he reconsiders and much to Van's frustration, they continue as a threesome.
9	"Carmen Goes Home"; Transliteration: "Karumen Kokyō ni Kaeru" (Japanese: カルメン故郷に帰る)	30 August 2005
Van, Wendy, and Joshua hitchhike with Carmen 99 to her hometown named Trinolia where Van knows of an engineer who should be able to crack the data disk recovered from the dragon armor. Carmen 99 reunites with her childhood friend Haeta, the daughter of an engineer named Findley who just happens to be the engineer Van was seeking. Haeta declines Van's request because of her father is now crippled and in poor health, but Findley overhears Van's request and accepts. While Wendy and Joshua stay at Carmen 99's house to spruce up, Van goes with Carmen 99 to her old school where she explains that Findley and her father had been business partners, and that Findley had fostered her after the deaths of her parents. The town has prospered in the last six years thanks to a special flower Haeta has helped cultivate. But Joshua overhears a conversation between Haeta and a visitor and realizes Haeta is growing the flowers for the Claw. He runs and tells Carmen, but knowing Van's reaction, orders Joshua not to tell him until she has gathered more information. She goes to Uncle Findley. She finds him collapsed in his lab, and he reveals the flowers are a drug that makes people happy, but it has horrible side effects – inhaling its pollen without the proper antibodies causes debilitating physical side effects, the cause of his poor health and crippling. The Claw supplies them with the medicine, but even with it, long term the pollen still causes problems. He begs Carmen to stop his daughter and destroy the flowers before they destroy the town, and Carmen goes to confront Haeta. Their talk is interrupted by smoke coming from Haeta's house. Wendy had made her own discoveries about the flowers. Trying to identify the flower Haeta is growing, Wendy had inhaled too much pollen and collapses and then woke up joyful and hyper to an extreme degree. Seeking to find out what ailed his young companion, Van started looking for answers and found them in Findley. Haeta has been growing the flowers for the Claw, Findley can no longer bear knowing what his daughter has done or knowing that he let her do it. He willing turns over the medicine to help Wendy and returns the disk, apologizing for not completing the job. Finally he asks Van to carry a message for him and then he sets fire to their house. When Haeta and Carmen arrive, Van says Findley chose to die in atonement for his daughter's crimes and to free her from her obligation to The Claw. As things end the Carmen has lost her childhood friend and is no longer welcome in Trinolia, and Van is no closer to finding The Claw despite having the disk. Carmen takes it, offering to bring it to another engineer, and they hope it will have been deciphered by the time Van and crew catch up. As Carmen's aircar travels, she pauses to watch as Haeta burns the flower field, and then leaves.
10	"Thank You Ocean"; Transliteration: "Umi yo Sankyū" (Japanese: 海よサンキュー)	6 September 2005
After arriving at the seaside city of Meuuniere, Van, Wendy, and Joshua planned to take the train to Zonnet Junction to rendezvous with Carmen 99. However, their plans take a detour when the railway is attacked by pirates. Vivian, a foreman with a local salvage union, asks Van to assist in stopping the pirates in their next operation to retrieve an enormous metal coffin from the ocean floor. Van agrees when he hears the reward includes express tickets to Zonnet Junction. The cunning seamen named Kaiji, the captain of the pirate submarine destroys the crane then freezes the water just as the coffin was nearly lifted. While the union tries to break through the ice, Van summons his armor and faces the pirates underwater, though struggling to maneuver against their torpedoes serves as a disadvantage. Van is able to defeat the pirates when they resurface after the union shatters the ice.
11	"Where The Goodbyes Are"; Transliteration: "Sayonara no Arika" (Japanese: さよならのありか)	13 September 2005
Upon arriving at Zonnet Junction, Wendy is shocked to find her brother Michael at the train station. Van and Joshua lose track of Wendy when the train passes by, having to split up to go search for her. Wendy is surprised to know that Michael has sided with The Claw, thereby supporting his cause. Michael then tells Wendy to return home to Evergreen as he departs. After Carmen 99 meets up with Joshua, the two see an angry Van after hearing that Wendy saw her brother but did not inform him, hence missing a crucial opportunity to find The Claw. He tells Wendy to go home like her brother suggested since she has no reason to go on anymore. Meanwhile, the metal coffin retrieved from Meuuniere arrives at Zonnet Junction. Michael and his comrades witness its opening to reveal the first armor of the Original Seven, called the Saudade of Sunday.
12	"The Days Of No Return"; Transliteration: "Kaerazaru Hibi" (Japanese: 帰らざる日々)	20 September 2005
Michael has begun activating Saudade of Sunday deep underneath Zonnet Junction. Gadved, who is a former friend of Van, appears before him at Zonnet Junction offering him to join the reestablished Original Seven. When Gadved reveals he is now working for The Claw, Van becomes enraged and challenges him to a duel. Fasalina, the woman who introduced the poisonous flower to Haeta, confronts Carmen at the train station, stealing the data disk. Joshua loses sight of Wendy, who wanders through the sky park within the train station and unknowingly encounters The Claw himself. They discuss how dreams make lives meaningful. As Joshua finds Wendy, Fasalina gives The Claw his prosthetic clawed hand.
13	"Dream in Progress"; Transliteration: "Yume no Tochū" (Japanese: 夢の途中)	27 September 2005
Ray locates the Claw Man in the sky park and lets loose an all-out attack, though Fasalina manages to hold him off temporarily. All the while, Van has summoned Dann of Thursday, revealed as the fifth armor, being in a pitch battle against Gadved, who beckons Diablo of Monday, recognized as the second armor. Van is vastly outclassed by Gadved's experience and is clearly on the losing end of this fight. Gadved urges Van to decide between retribution and atonement. Joshua blocks Ray from shooting The Claw, while Carmen 99 restrains Fasalina from fighting. Michael arrives in Saudade of Sunday, allowing The Claw and Fasalina to escape. Van releases a final blow on Gadved, terminating his life.
14	"Swift Brownie"; Transliteration: "Suwifuto Buraunī" (Japanese: スウィフト·ブラウニー)	4 October 2005
Van, Wendy, Carmen 99, and Joshua arrive at Duel Park, a town famous for holding armor battle events. The favorite contender in the current tournament, the B-1 Grand Prix, is an agile armor called Brownie piloted by a young girl named Priscilla. Giovanni, an armor manufacturer of the Rail Work Corporation, hires Van to defeat Priscilla in a duel while trumpeting Dann of Thursday as one of their own products. While Joshua is stuck in the hospital, Van, Wendy, and Carmen 99 trail Priscilla to discover her weaknesses but instead find out she would her prize money to support a group of orphans. Van and Priscilla meet in person before their fight and find they share a great deal in common. They agree to have a fair battle the next day with each side fighting with full strength.
15	"Neo Originals"; Transliteration: "Neo Orijinaru" (Japanese: ネオ·オリジナル)	11 October 2005
Desperate for money, Van, and Wendy go to a nearby casino, after two days of offering bodyguard services were for naught. Wendy bets her remaining money on a turtle race, with her pet turtle Kameo as her contestant. After having won the race, Wendy spends the money on one-way tickets to Jhoschdarn, via the blimp called Birca One. From there they can walk to Missoghi, where they plan to meet up with Carmen 99. A flashback is seen of when Van was first introduced to Dann of Thursday. Wendy tries to impress Van by dressing elegantly. The blimp is suddenly attacked by Woo, who seeks to prevent Van from approaching The Claw. Woo awakens Metsä of Tuesday, shown as the third armor of the Original Seven, and engages in combat against Van with Dann of Thursday.
16	"Electric Fireworks"; Transliteration: "Kagayaku wa Denryū Hibana" (Japanese: 輝くは電流火花)	18 October 2005
Van is left lying on the ground in his armor, with Woo announcing to him that he has three days to leave this land. Woo goes back to his castle and declares to the portrait of his mother that he plans to kill Van on the anniversary of her death. Meanwhile, Wendy is nursing Van back to health, but as soon as he wakes up, she catches a fever and Van has to take care of her. Van spends his days shaken up about his upcoming battle with Woo. Van remembers when Gadved had first given him a hexagonal puzzle, as well as how he had loved Elena in the past. As the dawn of the third day approaches, Van is on the brink of giving up and running away from his fight. However, one more reflection on his love for Elena might be just what he needs to win the match.
17	"Follow the X Spot"; Transliteration: "Zahyō Ekkusu o Oe" (Japanese: 座標Xを追え)	25 October 2005
Van and Wendy are surprised to see The El Dorado Five at the rendezvous point, along with Carmen 99, Yukiko, Joshua, and Priscilla. After they all agree that they must stop The Claw, Carmen 99 sets up coordinates on the data disk in the hover-base, while getting money for supplies through a man named Manson. They are guided to a seaport kingdom near Missoghi controlled by its queen Catherine Nakata, where the initial plan is to capture her and sail through. However, they are invited to participate in a swimming challenge, to which they accept. Wendy faces off against Marianne in a race, and, with the help of Kameo, is able to reach the goal. Meanwhile, Manson explains to Joshua that he and the queen were once business partners in marriage, working together to develop an innovative metallic fiber. However, Manson had rejected her idea of creating underwear using the fiber, which had led her to build a bikini kingdom prospered by women. Fasalina is seen making a transaction with Catherine for materials called the "impregnable armor stock". After the race, Carmen 99 and Fasalina cause the kingdom to crumble from underground, as everyone evacuates. In the end, Manson reunites with Catherine after sporting her metallic underwear prototype.
18	"Prayers Are For Saudade"; Transliteration: "Inoru wa Saudāde" (Japanese: 祈るはサウダーデ)	1 November 2005
After Michael has finished integrating with Saudade of Sunday, he is confirmed by Zapiero Muttaaca and introduced to Domingo. He later fixes a data link for Melissa, but Carossa misunderstands the situation. While at a mall in Missoghi, Catherine unveils to Carmen 99 of the transaction that Fasalina made. Back at the base, Muttaaca reveals to Michael that The Claw would create a utopia by means of a genocide. Taking Michael as a hostage Muttaaca and his crew demand a negotiation with The Claw, who attests to achieve world peace. Domingo is crushingly embraced by The Claw, as Muttaaca and rest of the crew escapes into a dragon armor underwater. Michael, while chasing after them in Saudade of Sunday, dodges their torpedoed attacks then slices the armor into pieces.
19	"Prayer's End"; Transliteration: "Sokai no Hate" (Japanese: 素懐の果て)	8 November 2005
The protagonists enter a secret passageway inside a cavern using the hover-base, but they later encounter two dragon armors. The El Dorado Five as well as Priscilla dispatch themselves to hold them off, though the seawater pierces through the tunnel during their attack. After Carmen destroys one dragon armor, Priscilla manages to damage the dorsal fin of the other dragon armor, while The El Dorado Five tear it apart. Meanwhile, Van summons Dann of Thursday, and Ray concurrently arrives on the scene with Vulcan. They are met by Carossa and Melissa in Sin of Friday and Sen of Saturday, respectively the sixth and seventh armors of the Original Seven. While Van spars with them head-on, Ray launches a missile and kills Melissa. Saddened by her death, a furious Carossa charges at Ray but is soon shot as well.
20	"Wonderful Universe"; Transliteration: "Wandafuru Yunibāsu" (Japanese: ワンダフル·ユニバース)	15 November 2005
The protagonists stumble upon an abandoned base, where they find a map and an injured survivor. Even though Michael is shocked to hear from Fasalina that Carossa and Melissa died in battle, Fasalina makes love to him, helping him grasp the meaning behind The Claw's dream of world peace. The survivor, after waking up, yells about Michael being a demon and should be stopped, before dying shortly thereafter. Michael and Fasalina discreetly go to see Wendy, attempting to ask her to join their side. As the other protagonists find them, Fasalina reveals that The Claw has contracted a fatal illness, and will sacrifice himself by catalyzing the special flower in order to reformat the world, therefore striving to make all inhabitants instinctively equal.
21	"Prayers to Heaven & Peace on Earth"; Transliteration: "Sora ni Negai o Chi ni wa Heiwa o" (Japanese: 空に願いを 地には平和を)	22 November 2005
Van summons Dann of Thursday after Fasalina calls forth Dahlia of Wednesday, shown as the fourth armor of the Original Seven, and the two begin to fight. Meanwhile, Michael is preparing to launch himself to the moon using the Saudade of Sunday. Wendy, Carmen 99, and Priscilla decide to scout out in the forest. When Priscilla mentions her feelings for Van, Wendy and Carmen 99 startlingly react. Soon after, Priscilla is attacked by a knight armor, though she easily defeats it. When Van finds himself subdued by Fasalina, The El Dorado Five intervene, but Fasalina manages to escape. Ray prepares to snipe Michael during the launching sequence, but Fasalina prevents that from happening, allowing Michael to orbit the atmosphere. To avoid a collision, Michael destroys the satellite base of Dann of Thursday, shutting down its functions.
22	"For Whose Sake?"; Transliteration: "Ta ga Tame ni" (Japanese: 誰がために)	29 November 2005
Wendy is contacted by The Claw to meet him on the shore of the island. She questions his purpose for his upcoming sacrifice as well as his use for Michael. When she returns to the hover-base, only to see an unsettled Van, who is still set on revenge. Priscilla comes up with the idea that Dann of Thursday could be restored by another satellite base. Wendy and Joshua spend countless hours researching outer space. The protagonists convince Ray to use Vulcan as an engine to fuel enough energy to launch. Wendy overhears Priscilla confessing her feelings to Van. It is revealed that Ray is slowly losing his eyesight, as Van gradually becomes weak. Van is soon launched into the sky and targets the satellite base of Diablo of Monday.
23	"A Song for Everyone"; Transliteration: "Minna no Uta" (Japanese: みんなのうた)	6 December 2005
Michael finds himself caught inside a bluish fluid shell on the moon that serves as a destroyer system, finding a deceased crew surrounding a spaceship, formerly the comrades of The Claw who had been trying to achieve colonization on the moon, but they had ended up murdering each other. Michael begins to transmit the destroyer system from the moon to the world. Van, inside Gadved's satellite base, starts the restoration process of his armor. The protagonists at the hover-base make their way towards The Claw's base-of-operations, set to take seven days to arrive there. Not only has the moon changed color, but it also seems as if it is falling out of orbit. Fasalina comes to stop them and commands her army of knight armors to attack. A blind Ray uses his Vulcan guided by Joshua to wipe them out. Van, now recuperated, briefly battles against Michael in outer space, confronting their differences.
24	"End of a Dream"; Transliteration: "Yume no Owari" (Japanese: 夢の終わり)	13 December 2005
When Fasalina retreats, The El Dorado Five and Priscilla handle the knight armors from behind, while Ray deals with the knight armors up ahead, as the hover-base continues to move forward. Meanwhile, The Claw initiates the Birthday Celebration sequence, as the base-of-operations begins to levitate into the sky. Fasalina returns to have a rematch with Ray. She is defeated by the blast of his cannon, but his armor is badly damaged in the process. After Joshua brings Ray onto the hover-base with Vulcan in tow, Ray knocks Joshua unconscious and drives the hover-base to the location of the birthday armor. When Michael returns there, Ray detonates Vulcan, though Michael survives the attack. Ray then travels up the stairway to attempt to shoot The Claw but to no avail. When The Claw deflects one of the bullets, it becomes jammed into the birthday armor.
25	"Fool Comes by Armor"; Transliteration: "Baka ga Yoroi de Yattekuru" (Japanese: バカがヨロイでやってくる)	20 December 2005
Ray is now killed by the subordinates, while Joshua becomes captured. Fasalina contacts Michael, saying she will return to the base of operations through an underground route. The birthday armor undergoes a repair session of forty-seven minutes. Using this as a diversion, Carmen 99 plans to sneak inside and wreck the distribution chambers while Wendy remains by her hover car. Their plan goes awry when the repair session finishes before schedule, and Carmen encounters Fasalina inside the distribution chambers growing the flowers that destroyed her hometown. While Carmen engages Fasalina, Yukiko finds Joshua, and the two begin sabotaging the launch sequence. Just then, the Dann of Thursday reenters the atmosphere is challenged by Saudade of Sunday. After a long battle, Dann manages to cripple Saudade and goes to battle The Claw. Bolstered by Van's reappearance, The El Dorado Five activate a backup engine for El Dorado, while Priscilla reawakens Brownie, as they both take on the remaining knight armors. Wendy rides the hover-car into the hangar of the base-of-operations and encounters Michael, returning from the destruction of Saudade of Sunday.
26	"Tuxedo Blowing in Tomorrow"; Transliteration: "Takishīdo wa Ashita ni Mau" (Japanese: タキシードは明日に舞う)	27 December 2005
Van, struggling to land a blow on The Claw, is soon defeated in the midst of battle. However, after reminiscing of all the people that care for him, Van unleashes the full strength of his armor. Joshua disconnects the launch sequence and disables the main power supply. Van delivers a final blow to the birthday armor, which destroys the base-of-operations. Van then walks into the armor and slashes The Claw to his death. After Michael reunites with Fasalina underground, Carmen departs after seeing them crushed by a boulder from above. The protagonists all make it out alive, with the assistance of Kaiji, Catherine, and Manson. Van says his farewell, with mixed reactions from the others. Years later, when Wendy helps a reporter write an article of her journey, Van unexpectedly crosses paths with her once again.
