= Masayo Kurata =

Japanese voice actress (born 1969)

- 倉田雅世
- Born: May 21, 1969 (age 57); Yokkaichi, Mie, Japan
- Other name: Koho Takayanagi (高柳香帆)
- Occupation: Voice actress
- Years active: 1994–present
- Agent: 81 Produce
- Height: 150 cm (4 ft 11 in)
- Spouse: Takeharu Ohnishi(voice actor)

Masayo Kurata (倉田雅世, Kurata Masayo; born May 21, 1969 in Yokkaichi, Mie) is a Japanese voice actress. Some of her major roles are Koyomi from Girls Bravo, Shinobu Maehara in Love Hina, Tomoe Kashiwaba in Rozen Maiden, Karinka from Steel Angel Kurumi, and Subaru Mikage in Comic Party. In video games, she voices Kurara in Purikura Daisakusen, Ai Senou in Hourglass of Summer, Chizuru Sakaki in the Rumbling Hearts / Muv-Luv visual novels, and Souffle Rossetti in Star Ocean: Till the End of Time.

== Filmography ==
=== Anime ===
List of voice performances in anime
Year	Title	Role	Notes	Source
1995	Bit the Cupid	Cursor		
1997–99	Agent Aika	Black Delmo	OAV series	
1997	Hanitarou Desu ja:ハニ太郎です。	Hani-ko, Miki Hirayama, Goddess		
1998	Marvelous Melmo	Tako	1998 redub	
1999	Toki no Daichi ja:刻の大地	Furea フレア	OVA	
1999	D4 Princess	Doris Rurido		
1999	Kyorochan	Go-chan		
1999–2001	Steel Angel Kurumi series	Karinka		
1999	Shūkan Storyland ja:週刊ストーリーランド	Girl		
1999	Tail of Two Sisters シスターズ輪舞	Yuibi Kawano 川野唯美	OVA Adult; As Norika Ashiro	
2000	Boys Be...	Risa Fujiki	TV ep. 2	
2000–02	Love Hina series	Shinobu Maehara	Also OVAs and specials	
2000	Hand Maid May	High School Girl		
2000	Inuyasha	Saya		
2000	Ghost Stories	Saeko		
2001	Angelic Layer	Girl, TJ's deus, Classmate, Torimaki, Kindergartener		
2001	Haré + Guu	Laya		
2001	Star Ocean EX	Eleanor		
2001	Go! Go! Itsutsugo Land	Yurika Nohara		
2001	Immoral Sisters	Tomoko Kitazawa	Adult OVA series	
2001	Magical Meow Meow Taruto	Charlotte		
2001	s-CRY-ed	Scherice Adjani		
2001	A Little Snow Fairy Sugar	Maiden		
2001	Najica Blitz Tactics	Fuyuki		
2002	Cheeky Angel	Yoshimi Shirasagi		
2002	Atashin'chi	Nohara		
2002	Jing: King of Bandits	Vermouth		
2002	G-On Riders	Yayoi Hoshikawa		
2002	Mao-chan	Carol Cameron		
2002	Mobile Suit Gundam Seed	Mayura Labatt		
2003	Immoral Sisters 2	Tomoko Kitazawa	OVA Adult	
2003	Gad Guard	Aiko Mary Harmony		
2003	Rumic Theater	Kamoshita		
2003	Planetes	Lucy Askam		
2004	Mermaid Melody Pichi Pichi Pitch Pure	Alala		
2004	Sgt. Frog	Heroine		
2004	Melody of Oblivion	Monster King S II		
2004	Hourglass of Summer	Ai Senou	OVA	
2004–05	Girls Bravo series	Koyomi Hare Nanaka		
2004–13	Rozen Maiden series	Tomoe Kashiwaba		
2004–05	Akane Maniax	Chizuru Sakaki	OVA series As Kaho Takayanagi	
2004	Mobile Suit Gundam SEED Astray	Kisato Yamabuki / Red Frame	promotional OVA	
2005	Fushigiboshi no Futagohime	Jill		
2005	Comic Party Revolution	Subaru Mikage		
2005	Doraemon	Tsubasa Ito, Cat, Non-chan, Hoka Minami	2005 TV series	
2005	Aria the Animation	Ami		
2005	Gun Sword	Fasalina		
2006–08	Code Geass series	Rakshata Chawla		
2006	Kujibiki Unbalance	Komaki Asagiri	replaced Yukari Tamura	
2007	Blue Drop	Onomil		
2007	Kimi ga Nozomu Eien: Next Season	Chizuru Sakaki	OVA	
2008	Kurenai	Head maid, Yasuko		
2009	Jungle Taitei – Yūki ga Mirai wo Kaeru	Tsushin	TV special 2009	
2009	Gokyodai Monogatari ご姉弟物語	Clerk		
2010	Stitch!	Announcer		
2010	Tegami Bachi Reverse	Sonny		
2012	The Knight in the Area	Passing woman		
2012	Kuromajo-san ga Toru!!	Toko Miyase		
2012	Girls und Panzer	Momoga, Yuri Isuzu		
2013	Fantasista Doll	Mikoto Uno, Anchi, Tennis club senior		
2015	Comical Psychosomatic Medicine	Wife	ONA	
2016	Active Raid	Rin Yamabuki		
	Anpanman	Eriko Aoki	OVA	
	Case Closed	Various characters		
	Crayon Shin-chan	Mieno, Chikage, cabin attendant, Katayama		

=== Film ===
List of voice performances in feature films
Year	Title	Role	Notes	Source
2003	Atashin'chi the movie	Nobara		
2006	Doraemon: Nobita's Dinosaur 2006	Pregnant Woman		
2007	Crayon Shin-chan: The Storm Called: The Singing Buttocks Bomb	Karukettsu CM Narration		
2007	Detective Conan: Jolly Roger in the Deep Azure	Kimiko Yamaguchi		
2010	Crayon Shin-chan: Super-Dimension! The Storm Called My Bride	TV Narration		
2011	Crayon Shin-chan: The Storm Called: Operation Golden Spy	Black suit		
2013	Crayon Shin-chan: Very Tasty! B-class Gourmet Survival!!	Hahappoi		
2015	Girls und Panzer der Film	Yuri Isuzu, Momoga, Rukuriri		

=== Video games ===
List of voice performances in video games
Year	Title	Role	Notes	Source
1996	Quiz Nanairo Dreams	Momoko Fujiya, Momoko Fujikura		
1996	Revelations: Persona	Yuka Ayase		
1996	Purikura Daisakusen	Kurara Apricot		
1996	Fire Woman Matoigumi ja:ファイアーウーマン纏組	Mako Mizuya	Also 1998 port	
1996	Pyon Pyon Kyaruru no Mahjong Hiyori	Kyaruru		
1997	Digital Ange: Dennou Tenshi SS	Sefinesu	Sega Saturn	
1998	Kindaichi Case Files: Star Viewing Island: Sad Demon of Revenge	Reika Hayami		
1998	Eiyuu Shigan: Gal Act Heroism	Kurara	Sega Saturn	
1999	Tokimeki Memorial Pocket Sports	Patricia McGrath	Game Boy	
2000	Summon Night	Monati	PS1/PS2	
2000	Immoral Sisters	Tomoko Kitazawa	PC Adult	
2000	Sakuranbo Kaigan さくらんぼ海岸	Tomomi Ishizuka	PC Adult	
2000	Yume no Tsubasa	Oka Shiragiku	PS1/PS2	
2000–03	Love Hina series	Shinobu Maehara		
2001	Macross M3	Operator	Dreamcast	
2001	Super Galdelic Hour スーパーギャルデリックアワー	Toko		
2001	Yume no Tsubasa: Fate of Heart	Oka Shiragiku	Dreamcast	
2001	Comic Party	Subaru Mikage	Dreamcast; Also DCE in 2003, PSP version in 2005	
2001	Ashita no Yukinojou ja:あしたの雪之丞	Akiko Kubo	PC Adult	
2002	Akane Maniax	Chizuru Sakaki	PC	
2002	Hourglass of Summer	Ai Senou	PS1/PS2	
2002	Brave Knight ~Leverant Eiyuuden~ ブレイブナイト ～リーヴェラント英雄伝～	Ferryl Tread フェリル=トレッド	Other	
2002	Ashita no Yukinojou 2 あしたの雪之丞2	Akiko Kubo	PC Adult	
2002	Cross Hermit ~Welcome to the Farthest~	Arushie Bersado アルシエ=ベルサード		
2002	Lupin the 3rd: Treasure of the Sorcerer King	Teresa Faust	PS1/PS2	
2003	Star Ocean: Till the End of Time	Souffle Rossetti		
2003	Muv-Luv	Chizuru Sakaki	PC Adult, also all ages version	
2003	Kyuuketsu Hime Yui: Senyasyo 吸血姫夕維～千夜抄～	Naho Hasebe		
2003	Sunrise World War from Sunrise Eiyuutan サンライズワールドウォー From サンライズ英雄譚	Sherrice Adjani	PS1/PS2	
2004	Mobile Suit Gundam SEED: Owaranai Asu e	Kisato Yamabuki		
2005	Girls Bravo Romance15's	Koyomi Hare Nanaka	PS1/PS2	
2005	3rd Super Robot Wars Alpha: To the End of the Galaxy	Mayurarabattsu		
2006	Rozen Maiden ~duellwalzer~	Tomoe Kashiwaba	PS1/PS2	
2007	Kujibiki Unbalance	Komaki Asagiri	PS1/PS2	
2007	Luminous Arc	WiWi	Nintendo DS	
2007	Rozen Maiden ~gebetgarten~	Tomoe Kashiwaba	PS1/PS2	
2008	Code Geass: Lelouch of the Rebellion Lost Colors	Rakshata Chawla		
2008	Tales of Hearts	Kyashiti		
2010	Another Century's Episode: R	Rakshata Chawla	PS3	
2014	Rozen Maiden: Wechseln Sie Welt ab	Tomoe Kashiwaba		
2014	Girls und Panzer: Senshadō, Kiwamemasu!	Momoga		
2018	Super Mario Party	Pom Pom	Nintendo Switch	

=== Drama CDs ===
List of voice performances in audio recordings
Title	Role	Notes	Source
Code Geass series	Rakushata	talk CD	
G-On Riders series	Yayoi Hoshikawa	CDs and radio	
Gun Sword	Fasalina	talk CD	
Love Hina series	Shinobu Maehara	CDs and radio	
Mobile Suit Gundam SEED Astray	Juri Yamabuki	promotion	
Rozen Maiden series	Tomoe Kashiwaba	Drama CDs	
Steel Angel Kurumi series	Karinka		
Chara Ani Night		Radio	
Digital Ange Dennou Tenshi SS	Sephines	Radio drama	
Ika Rosu no tanjōbi	Kazene Kiryuu	Radio	
Seiyuu Best Talk Collection		CD	
Seiyuu Paso Con		Radio	
Sweet Tanteidan		Internet	
Yume no Tsubasa		Drama CD	

=== Dubbing ===
List of voice performances in overseas dubbing
Title	Role	Notes	Source
Little Bear	Emily		

=== Tokusatsu ===
List of voice performances in tokusatsu
Year	Title	Role	Notes	Source
2006	Chousei Kantai Sazer-X	Thunder Shogun Sandara		
