= Girls Bravo =

Japanese media franchise

- First volume, released by Kadokawa Shoten on June 27, 2001, featuring Miharu Sena Kanaka

GIRLSブラボー (Gārusu Burabō)
- Genre: Harem, romantic comedy
- Manga
- Written by: Mario Kaneda
- Published by: Kadokawa Shoten
- English publisher: NA: Tokyopop
- Magazine: Shōnen Ace; Ace Momogumi
- Original run: December 26, 2000 – September 13, 2005
- Volumes: 10
- Anime television series
- Directed by: Ei Aoki
- Produced by: Yoshiyuki Matsuzaki; Atsuya Takase (Season 1); Hiroyuki Kitaura (Season 2)
- Written by: Hiroshi Watanabe
- Music by: Noriyasu Agematsu
- Studio: AIC Spirits
- Licensed by: AUS: Madman Entertainment; NA: Funimation Entertainment
- Original network: Fuji TV (Season 1), WOWOW (Season 2)
- Original run: July 6, 2004 – April 21, 2005
- Episodes: 24
- Video game

Girls Bravo Romance 15's
- Developer: Kadokawa Shoten
- Publisher: Kadokawa Shoten
- Genre: Dating sim, Visual novel
- Platform: PlayStation 2
- Released: JP: January 27, 2005

Girls Bravo (Japanese: GIRLSブラボー, Hepburn: Gārusu Burabō) is a Japanese manga series written and illustrated by Mario Kaneda and serialized from 2000 to 2005 in Shōnen Ace by Kadokawa Shoten. The story focuses on a high school boy who is allergic to girls who is transported to a mysterious world with a mostly female population; when he returns, one of the girls from that world becomes his housemate.

The anime adaptation of Girls Bravo, directed by Ei Aoki and animated by AIC Spirits, aired in Japan from 2004 to 2005. There are 24 episodes total. The anime series was released in English by Geneon, and the manga was released in English by Tokyopop. A visual novel was also released for the PlayStation 2.

In July 2010, Funimation Entertainment released a statement on their Twitter feed confirming that they have licensed Girls Bravo.

== Plot ==
Yukinari Sasaki is an average high school student who is frequently ridiculed by girls to the point that he developed an allergic reaction to them. As a result, he breaks out in hives whenever he comes into contact with a female. One day, when he returns home from school, he is kicked into his bathtub by his neighbor Kirie Kojima, but is transported to Seiren (セーレン, Sēren; "Siren" in the Tokyopop manga translation), a mysterious world with a mostly female population. He befriends Miharu Sena Kanaka, who ends up following him to Earth. Other Seiren girls with various motives soon visit and join the household. They are taken on many adventures as Miharu discovers the wonders of Earth.

== Characters ==
=== Main ===
Yukinari Sasaki (佐々木 雪成, Sasaki Yukinari)
Voiced by: Mamiko Noto, Daisuke Sakaguchi (Drama CDs) (Japanese); Yuri Lowenthal (English)
Yukinari has been ridiculed by girls all his life, and has developed an extreme case of gynophobia in which he suffers an allergic reaction whenever he comes into contact with one. One day, after he is kicked into his bathtub by Kirie Kojima, his next door neighbor, he is transported to the alien world of Seiren, a planet where men comprise less than 10% of the population. He meets Miharu who does not trigger his allergy. She follows him back to Earth and is the main cause of his misadventures involving girls and subsequent abuse by Kirie.
Miharu Sena Kanaka (ミハル·セナ·カナカ)
Voiced by: Ayako Kawasumi, Kawasumi (Drama CDs) (Japanese); Michelle Ruff (English)
Miharu is a resident of Seiren who pulls Yukinari Sasaki to Seiren and follows him back to Earth to live with him. She has a mark on her forehead shaped like three dots in a triangle called Seikon, which provides her with several powers, including the ability to travel between Seiren and Earth and the power to create explosions whenever she is in emotional distress. She is also the only woman who can touch Yukinari without triggering his allergy. Miharu has a large appetite and a rapid metabolism. On Earth, much of her focus is in questioning her friends as to whether something is edible or not (like butterflies), and her continuous misunderstandings about Earth (such as believing that April Fools' Day means that everyone on Earth lies for one day) are the title's primary source of humor. Despite this, she has a heart of gold, an explorer's fascination with Earth, and has a close relationship with Yukinari. She is an extremely innocent girl who does not show any discomfort with being partially or fully naked in front of Yukinari, and she does not lose her temper even when made the target of Fukuyama's lecherous actions, unless the process involves food or disrupts her eating time.
Kirie Kojima (小島 桐絵, Kojima Kirie)
Voiced by: Chiwa Saitō, Masumi Asano (Drama CDs) (Japanese); Lulu Chiang (English)
Kirie is Yukinari Sasaki's next door neighbor, classmate, and childhood friend who takes care of him from time to time since. She is especially well-endowed, which makes her a natural target for Kazuharu Fukuyama's perversions. However, due to her physical aptitude and martial-arts abilities, she always defeats him. She regularly beats up Yukinari Sasaki for his bad luck. Kirie inadvertently sends Yukinari to Seiren for the first time when she slugs him for innocently walking in on her when she was showering in his bathroom. Despite their often turbulent relationship, Kirie has a deep affection for Yukinari and usually tries to help him. Because of her strong character and appearance, Kirie attracts a large number of admirers among the boys in her high school, in particular Kazuharu Fukuyama who often molests and gropes her whenever he has the chance to. In the manga, Kirie is accosted by an alternate version of Lisa Fukuyama when she enters a parallel world through an enchanted mirror in Fukuyama's house. In the anime adaptation, she also attracts female admirers, specifically Kosame and Hijiri Kanata, much to her displeasure. A running gag throughout the series is Kirie's complete lack of cooking skills which result in the creation of food that is inedible and dangerous. Kirie has a fear of ghosts and the paranormal, and despite her tomboyish character enjoys collecting dolls.
Kazuharu Fukuyama (福山 和春, Fukuyama Kazuharu)
Voiced by: Ryōtarō Okiayu, Shin-ichiro Miki (Drama CDs) (Japanese); Liam O'Brien (English) of which O'Brien received a nomination for Best Actor in a Comedy at the American Anime Awards.
Fukuyama is a classmate of Yukinari Sasaki and Kirie Kojima. Fukuyama is a rich, powerful, corrupt, perverted, selfish, and arrogant boy, and while he often chases girls and insults Yukinari by calling him "Puny-Nari" (チビなり, Chibi-nari), he does show a serious, caring side in critical situations. He suffers androphobia to the point that he has developed an allergy that causes him to break out with a rash whenever he comes into contact with another male. He often appears without the others noticing until he announces his presence, whereupon he either gropes or strips the girls of their clothing, which always earns him a severe beating from Kirie. For unknown reasons despite sexually assaulting many girls including Kirie herself, he has never suffered consequences from the law. Despite his own lecherous behavior, Fukuyama is highly protective of his younger sister, Lisa, and strongly objects to her affections for Yukinari.
Lisa Fukuyama (福山 リサ, Fukuyama Risa; spelled as "Risa Fukuyama" in the Tokyopop manga translation)
Voiced by: Yuki Matsuoka, Satomi Kōrogi (Drama CDs) (Japanese); Hunter MacKenzie Austin (English)
Lisa is Kazuharu Fukuyama's slightly insane younger sister. Lisa is a master of black magic, which causes several issues throughout the series such as infesting her family's mansion with ghosts, summoning a giant octopus in the school swimming pool, and causing an explosion within a shopping center. Lisa is constantly accompanied by Hayate and Kosame, who cater to her every whim such as gathering intelligence or even kidnapping. She develops an infatuation for Yukinari after his appearance matches a description in her horoscope for her soul mate and often employs her magic to get closer to him—with predictably disastrous results. Although she considers Miharu a rival, she is very fond of Ebi, who reminds her of the pet cat she owned when she was a little girl. In the anime adaptation, Ebi's girl form reminds her of a doll she used to spend her days with, which she reunites with later on thanks to Tomoka's magic.
Koyomi Hare Nanaka (コヨミ·ハレ·ナナカ)
Voiced by: Masayo Kurata, Hekiru Shiina (Drama CDs) (Japanese); Carrie Savage (English)
Koyomi is an androphobic resident of Seiren. She has fear of men on Earth and her phobia is only made worse by being one of Kazuharu Fukuyama's favorite targets; in the manga, she keeps a diary of how many times he has accosted her. Originally sent to Earth on a mission from the Space Travel Agency to 'retrieve' Miharu Sena Kanaka, she later moves into Yukinari's house along with her companion Tomoka Lana Jude on a prolonged mission to find a husband for Miharu's sister Maharu. However, her fear of men makes the act of even talking to a man nearly impossible. Koyomi's favorite pastime is reading, but she has a natural talent for table tennis, having won a tournament for a similar sport on Seiren. In the anime adaptation, Koyomi is also searching for her father, a native of Earth, whom she eventually reunites with. Koyomi's mother possessed a Seikon mark, and Koyomi herself possesses a dormant form of Seikon allowing her to create a portal to Seiren after Miharu is kidnapped by Hijiri Kanata. After she loses in Fukuyama's Cosplay Mahjong game, she is forced to wear nothing but a python, which she later ironically adopts as a pet.
Tomoka Lana Jude (トモカ·ラナ·ジュード, Tomoka Rana Jūdo)
Voiced by: Ayaka Saitō (Japanese); J-Ray (English)
Tomoka is a resident of Seiren who is sent to aid Koyomi Hare Nanaka in finding Miharu's older sister Maharu a groom after her less than productive efforts. Although a child, Tomoka deeply resents being treated as one and insists that she is as mature as anyone else, despite frequent actions by her which prove otherwise. She gets along fairly well with Fukuyama, whom she later refers to as an older brother after the two team up to obtain some mutual objective. She has developed a small crush on him but it is not something he is aware of. Tomoka can also use transformation magic. In the anime adaptation, Tomoka frequently uses Ebi as a makeshift club for hitting almost anything and anyone; she becomes friends with Lisa after conceding defeat in a magical duel. She is also obsessed with Poyon, her favorite TV show character. Because she is a child, Tomoka is able to have contact with Yukinari without triggering his female allergy. She also looks up to Kirie as an older sister. For example, she follows Kirie's example of drop-kicking Fukuyama right in the face. Tomoka is later revealed to be a genius capable of instantly answering a complex math equation from a college entrance exam.
Ebi (えび)
Voiced by: Tomoko Kaneda (Japanese); Karen Thompson (English)
In the Mahjong episode, Voiced by Fumihiko Tachiki (Japanese); Dameon Clarke (English)
Ebi is a creature from Seiren that resembles a plump miniature seal with the face of a cat and a pair of large bobbing antenna, which causes Miharu to claim she resembles a shrimp (ebi is the Japanese word for shrimp). She is accidentally summoned by Miharu during a bath, and becomes a pet for Miharu and the girls. In the anime adaptation, Tomoka pulls her out of her bag. She suffers a great deal of torment at the hands of Tomoka, who uses her as a club, flail, fishing bait, or handball. When Tomoka transforms Ebi into a girl for a brief amount of time, Yukinari and Kirie pay more attention to the transformed Ebi than to her. In the anime episode where the gang play Mahjong, Ebi is able to think through the entire play in her mind but is unable to communicate the move to novice Tomoka, rendering her plan fruitless. Also in the anime, Ebi can shoot a powerful beam attack called the E-beam from her mouth although it takes a while to recharge.

=== Supporting ===
Maharu Sena Kanaka (マハル·セナ·カナカ)
Maharu is Miharu's well-endowed older sister. She is very determined and will not hesitate to use violence to get her way. Although initially jealous of Miharu's relationship with Yukinari Sasaki, she eventually gives them her blessing. Much to Yukinari's dismay, that does not stop her from flirting and fondling him whenever she gets a chance. Due to Seiren's low male population and the fact that she is close to 30, Maharu assigns both Koyomi and Tomoka to find a man of her own on Earth. Though flirtatious, she is, in fact, quite picky by Seiren standards, rejecting Kazuharu Fukuyama immediately upon discovering his perverted nature. In the epilogue for the anime adaptation, she proposes to Hayate. Despite proposing to him, getting married in the manga, and giving Yukinari and Miharu her blessing, she is still obsessed with Yukinari, loves him, flirts with him, and wants to be with him. Maharu is voiced by Sayaka Ohara in Japanese and by Megan Hollingshead (credited as "Karen Thompson") in English. Kotono Mitsuishi provides her voice for the Drama CDs.
Lilica Stacy (梨々花・ステイジー, Ririka Suteijī)
Lilica is the Fukuyamas' chief maid. She is stoic and polite, even when Kirie destroys some expensive equipment. However, she shows shock when Kirie and Yukinari introduce themselves as Fukuyama's friends. She later reveals that she has fought in military operations in Bosnia, Somalia, Chechnya, and Afghanistan. She is highly intelligent and is sometimes seen with a laptop which operates mechanical devices within the Fukuyama mansion, and also a spy satellite, which explains how Kazuharu Fukuyama constantly finds Koyomi and the others. In the anime adaptation, Lilica places Mamoru Machida as an apprentice after being impressed by his desire to clean the world. She is also occasionally hinted to be in love with Fukuyama. Lilica is voiced by Natsuko Kuwatani in Japanese and by Wendy Tomson in English.
Hayate (疾風)
Hayate is one of Lisa Fukuyama's attendants. While he only makes a handful of appearances in the manga, Hayate in the anime forms a strong rivalry/friendship with Tomoka, and the two occasionally battle one another in friendly duels. Hayate is a very calm, loyal, and serious individual who will go to great lengths for his mistress, Lisa; this usually involves doing some sort of research or private investigating. Tomoka nicknames him "ninja" because of his stealthy ways, only revealing himself when attending to Lisa, or to attack. Hayate is voiced by Takanori Hoshino in Japanese and by Patrick Seitz in English.
Kosame (小雨)
Kosame is Lisa Fukuyama's second attendant. In the anime adaptation, Kosame is also a considerably stronger fighter than Kirie Kojima, and after fighting with Kirie, she falls in love with her. Her obsession is so strong that just being in Kirie's presence is enough to make Kosame either grope or make some other pass at her, which usually requires Hayate to rein her in. When not fawning over Kirie, Kosame is as stoic a figure as Hayate and frequently uses her gun to either pry information out of others or to force them into doing her bidding. Kosame is voiced by Nozomi Masu in Japanese and by Zarah Little in English.
Nanae Kuh Haruka (ナナエ・クウ・ハルカ, Nanae Kū Haruka)
Nanae is Koyomi and Tomoka's superior in the Space Travel Agency. Nanae is in charge of the missing persons department and assigns agents to find and retrieve residents of Seiren who have accidentally been transported to Earth. In the anime adaptation, she helps Maharu Sena Kanaka contact Yukinari so that the others can rescue Miharu. Nanae is voiced by Yukiko Iwai in Japanese and by Rita Stephens in English.
Mamoru Machida (町田 守, Machida Mamoru)
Mamoru is an obsessive-compulsive classmate of Yukinari Sasaki's. He dons an alter-ego, Lightning Squadron Mamo Ranger - a parody of the Super Sentai series - in the pursuit of his passion for cleaning and pointing out litterbugs, although at first glance his 'squadron' consists of only him. Extremely accident prone, he tends to cause more problems than he solves, whereupon his deluded sense of reality causes him to blame his "villainous opponents." He later drafts the others into the Mamo Rangers, although they want absolutely nothing to do with it. In the anime adaptation, Mamoru becomes an apprentice to Lilica which turns him from a mild annoyance into a serious threat to public safety. Mamoru is voiced by Hiroyuki Yoshino in Japanese and by Sam Riegel in English.
Hijiri Kanata (彼方 ヒジリ, Kanata Hijiri; spelled as "Hiziri Kanata" in the Tokyopop manga translation)
Hijiri is a strict guidance counselor who joins Yukinari's high school. In the anime adaptation, she serves as a subordinate for Yukina, whose mission is to observe and eventually kidnap Miharu. Hijiri had been obsessed with Miharu since they were both children, and Yukina promises to give Miharu to her in exchange for helping her achieve her goals. However, Hijiri is eventually defeated by Kirie, and forgets about Miharu and begins to obsess over Kirie instead. Hijiri is voiced by Aya Hisakawa in Japanese and by Erica Shaffer in English.
Mrs. Sasaki
Mrs. Sasaki is Yukinari Sasaki's mother. As Yukinari keeps Miharu Sena Kanaka a secret from her, Mrs. Sasaki begins to fear that the strange occurrences in her house were due to a ghost, but eventually decides not to worry about it since all the "ghost" did was eat all the food. She later leaves Yukinari to be with his father, who is on a business trip.
Vegetable Store Keeper
A local grocer who befriends Miharu at the start of the series, and gives her the nickname Banana Girl. He is voiced by Takashi Nagasako in Japanese and by Doug Stone in English.
The Boss (弟分, Otōbun)
A character exclusive to the anime adaptation, The Boss is an overweight and soft-spoken thug dressed in a Hawaiian shirt and is usually accompanied by an exuberant man in a blue leisure suit. The thugs cross pass Yukinari Sasaki and his friends throughout the series. However, after Miharu Sena Kanaka is kidnapped by Hijiri Kanata, the Boss helps Yukinari realize that the only way to get Miharu back is to fight for her with everything he has got. When his friend later asks why he never spoke before, the Boss tells him that he simply never had anything to say. The Boss is voiced by Toshihide Tsuchiya in Japanese and by J.C. Miller in English.
Hakana (はかな)
A ghost who has been haunting the Fukuyamas' private hot spring. Last winter, she was bathing at the spring when a pervert caught and groped her. When she tried to catch him, she slipped on a wet rock, hit her head and died. In order to move on to the afterlife, she wants to catch a pervert. Lisa suggests they re-enact the scene, and volunteers Yukinari and herself, although Hakana accidentally possesses Kirie instead. When Kirie tries to resist the groping, Hakana realizes that Kirie likes Yukinari. When Kirie and Yukinari hug, Hakana is freed; she thanks the group and tells Kirie what a wonderful person Yukinari is. She is voiced by Ai Shimizu in Japanese and by Tara Platt in English.
Yukina (ユキナ)
A character exclusive to the anime adaptation, Yukina is the ruthless leader of the Space Management Bureau's Special Forces Division in Seiren, who also has the power of Seikon. Because of her slight build and Seikon markings covering her body, Yukina felt that no man would ever love her and developed a condition that causes her to break out in hives upon contact with men. Her illness and anti-masculine prejudices are what cause Yukina to decide that if she cannot be loved by men then no one in Seiren can. Eventually, Yukina has her subordinate Hijiri Kanata send Miharu Sena Kanaka back to Seiren to permanently seal the gateway to Earth using her power, making Seiren a "woman-only paradise". But after being shown kindness by Yukinari Sasaki, Yukina falls in love with him and releases Miharu. Yukina is voiced by Sakura Nogawa in Japanese and by Elise Baughman in English.

== Media ==
=== Manga ===
Written and illustrated by Mario Kaneda, the manga was originally serialized in 2000 in Kadokawa Shoten's Shōnen Ace magazine and has since been released in 10 tankōbon volumes. The first volume was published and released in Japan by Kadokawa Shoten on June 27, 2001 and the last volume was released on April 9, 2005. In English the series was released by Tokyopop. Book one was released in September 2005 with the last book being released in December 2007. Viz Media released the digital version starting with volume one on March 17, 2015, and completing with the release of volume ten on September 29, 2015.

The series has also been licensed in Europe and Asia. In Europe, the series was published in French by Pika Édition and in German by Carlson Comics. In Asia, the series was published in English by Chuang Yi.

==== Volume list ====
No.	Original release date	Original ISBN	English release date	English ISBN
1	June 27, 2001	978-4-04-713435-5	September 13, 2005	978-1-59816-040-6
2	November 28, 2001	978-4-04-713466-9	December 13, 2005	978-1-59816-041-3
3	April 25, 2002	978-4-04-713491-1	March 7, 2006	978-1-59816-042-0
4	August 28, 2002	978-4-04-713506-2	June 13, 2006	978-1-59816-043-7
5	February 26, 2003	978-4-04-713535-2	September 5, 2006	978-1-59816-044-4
6	September 1, 2003	978-4-04-713570-3	November 28, 2006	978-1-59816-045-1
7	April 3, 2004	978-4-04-713616-8	February 27, 2007	978-1-59816-046-8
8	June 18, 2004	978-4-04-713631-1	May 29, 2007	978-1-59816-047-5
9	November 26, 2004	978-4-04-713682-3	September 4, 2007	978-1-59816-048-2
10	April 9, 2005	978-4-04-713716-5	December 4, 2007	978-1-59816-197-7

=== Anime ===
North American DVD cover of Girls Bravo volume 1

An anime adaptation of the manga was directed by Ei Aoki and produced by Anime International Company's AIC Spirits division. It aired on Fuji Television on July 6, 2004, and ran until September 28, 2004, spanning 11 episodes. A second season, consisting of 13 episodes was later broadcast on WOWOW from January 27 to April 21, 2005. Four pieces of theme music were used in the series. The first opening theme, titled "Going My Way", was performed by Yozuca*. Yozuca* also sang the second opening theme, titled "Ever After". "Koko ni Iru kara", the ending theme, was performed by Miyuki Hashimoto, who also sang the second ending theme "And Then...". In Japan, the series was released across 13 Region 2 DVD compilation volumes. Geneon Entertainment also licensed the series for an English-language dubbed release in North America. Madman Entertainment also licensed the series for release in Australia and New Zealand.

In July 2010, North American anime distributor Funimation Entertainment announced on their Twitter feed that the company has licensed Girls Bravo after streaming the first episode of the series on YouTube.

==== Episode list ====
===== Season 1 =====
No.	Title	Original release date
1	"Bravo From the Bathroom!"; Transliteration: "Ofuroba kara Burabō!" (Japanese: お風呂場からブラボー!)	July 6, 2004
Yukinari Sasaki walks home from school, but his neighbor Kirie Kojima beats up Yukinari, inadvertently sending him to Seiren, a planet whose population is 90% female. While there, he meets Miharu Sena Kanaka, as well as her older sister Maharu. Yukinari discovers that touching Miharu does not make him allergic to girls. After being chased around by the locals, Yukinari returns to Earth only to find that Miharu has appeared there as well.
2	"Bravo at School!"; Transliteration: "Gakkō de Burabō!" (Japanese: 学校でブラボー!)	July 13, 2004
Enticed by the thought of spicy curry bread, Miharu ventures outside to find Yukinari's school and buy some, instead of waiting for him to come back. Along the way, she discovers the shopping district, including bananas.
3	"Cooking is Bravo!"; Transliteration: "Kukkingu wa Burabō!" (Japanese: クッキングはブラボー!)	July 27, 2004
After reading her daily horoscope, Kazuharu's sister Lisa has a prophecy-fulfuilled romantic encounter with Yukinari on the way to school. She kidnaps Yukinari and tries to marry him.
4	"Bravo in the Mansion!"; Transliteration: "Gōtei de Burabō!" (Japanese: 豪邸でブラボー!)	August 10, 2004
Kirie's planned outing with Yukinari becomes a search for Miharu within the vast Fukuyama estate.
5	"Bravo on a Rainy Day! Part 1"; Transliteration: "Ame no Hi ni Burabō! (Zenpen)" (Japanese: 雨の日にブラボー!(前編))	August 17, 2004
An amnesiac Koyomi arrives from Seiren; and after some recollection, she remembers her mission of finding Miharu and return her home.
6	"Bravo on a Rainy Day! Part 2"; Transliteration: "Ame no Hi ni Burabō! (Kōhen)" (Japanese: 雨の日にブラボー!(後編))	August 24, 2004
Koyomi observes Miharu's time on Earth. Despite her decision to return to Seiren alone, Miharu joins her. After a brief Seiren stay, Maharu allows Miharu to return to Earth, along with Tomoka and Koyomi.
7	"Look for a Groom Bravo!"; Transliteration: "Omuko-san Sagashi de Burabō!" (Japanese: おムコさん探しでブラボー!)	August 31, 2004
Koyomi is given the task of finding a husband for Maharu and struggles with her androphobia. Tomoka competitively takes on that same task.
8	"Lots of Bravo!"; Transliteration: "Ippai de Burabō!" (Japanese: いっぱいでブラボー!)	September 9, 2004
Miharu consumes an unknown liquid in chemistry class, and inadvertently creates a swarm of Miharu clones which explode upon physical contact. Local shop keepers are then left to defend themselves from the clones insatiable appetite.
9	"Bravo at the Great Magic War!"; Transliteration: "Mahō Taisan de Burabō!" (Japanese: 魔法大戦でブラボー!)	September 14, 2004
Tomoka and Lisa fight over the human form of Ebi. Lisa is then reminded about her magically animated doll friend.
10	"Bravo at the Hot Springs!"; Transliteration: "Onsen de Burabō!" (Japanese: 温泉でブラボー!)	September 21, 2004
Yukinari and friends travel to a hot springs resort. There, they find a female spirit unable to leave Earth and work together to help her move on to the afterlife.
11	"Ping-Pong is Bravo!"; Transliteration: "Pinpon de Burabō!" (Japanese: ピンポンでブラボー!)	September 28, 2004
After the Fukuyamas buy out the various local hot spring resorts, Kazuharu issues a table tennis challenge between himself and Yukinari and Koyomi, where, if Kazeharu wins, Kirie has to do whatever Kazeharu tells her.

===== Season 2 =====
No.	Title	Original release date
12	"Bravo at the Pool!"; Transliteration: "Pūru de Burabō!" (Japanese: プールでブラボー!)	January 27, 2005
In an attempt to get close to Miharu, Fukuyama buys the school swimming pool, remodels it into a resort, and sends every boy but himself and (accidentally) Yukinari, tumbling out through a hole in the floor. And with the inadvertent help of Lisa's magic, he switches bodies with Yukinari.
13	"Fight Bravo!"; Transliteration: "Faito Burabō!" (Japanese: ファイト·ブラボー!)	February 3, 2005
An invitation to a baseball game turns out to be a trap set by Fukuyama. Kirie is forced to fight in his all-girl fighting tournament.
14	"First Date is Bravo!"; Transliteration: "Hatsu Dēto wa Burabō!" (Japanese: 初デートはブラボー!)	February 10, 2005
Yukinari and Miharu finally go out on a date, with Fukuyama and Kirie in hot pursuit. Miharu does some rather bold actions; it turns out she has been acting scenarios from Fukuyama's book. Later on Fukuyama steals Yukinari and Miharu's lunch, causing Yukinari to chase Fukuyama down. Yukinari eventually recovers the lunch (thanks to Kirie's help) but he cannot find Miharu.
15	"Clean Up Bravo!"; Transliteration: "Osōji Burabō!" (Japanese: お掃除ブラボー!)	February 17, 2005
A classmate of Yukinari and the others, Mamoru Machida, appears as a superhero who wants to keep the school clean, and who confronts everyone that tries to litter. Miharu senses how hard he tries, and introduces him to Lilica, Fukuyama's maid, so that he learns how to do a better job.
16	"As Long As We're Together Then Bravo!"; Transliteration: "Futari Nara Burabō!" (Japanese: ふたりならブラボー!)	February 24, 2005
Tomoka goes out to continue with her mission on getting a man for Maharu, but meets Fukuyama. They both agree to tail Kirie, who seems to be attracting every man in town as she walks around, and try to set up a situation where Kirie can think of Tomoka as being mature and not just a kid.
17	"Bravo at the Part-time Job!"; Transliteration: "Arubaito wa Burabō!" (Japanese: アルバイトはブラボー!)	March 3, 2005
Miharu, Kirie, and Koyomi acquire a part-time job at a video game convention to fix the bathtub after being damaged by one of Miharu's sneezing fits. Tomoka and Yukinari tail them, but are discovered. When a fourth part-timer fails to arrive, Yukinari is drafted into dressing up like a girl and playing eye-candy as a host. After "Yuki" interviews some voice actors, Kirie gets an offer for extra cash by putting Yuki through a series of contests where the winner gets to go on a date with Yuki. The competitor turns out to be Fukuyama.
18	"Bravo at Mahjong!"; Transliteration: "Mājan de Burabō!" (Japanese: 麻雀でブラボー!)	March 10, 2005
To bring an end to Tomoka's boredom, Fukuyama brings a Mahjong game over to Yukinari's place, but it has special rules: the consequences for losing include rubbing dares, stripping and cosplay.
19	"Rabbit Ears Bravo!"; Transliteration: "Usa Mimi Burabō!" (Japanese: ウサ耳ブラボー!)	March 17, 2005
A trio of rabbit girls (Miharu, Kirie, and Koyomi) act as phantom thieves as they steal a mask from Mamoru. Detective Fukuyama tries to track them down. He visits the girls' cafe and reveals that Mamoru's daughter has been kidnapped. The girls manage to steal a CD from Fukuyama which reveals the location. The girls try to rescue the daughter (Lisa), but it is a trap by Fukuyama. The girls are caught, but escape. Fukuyama pledges his love to Kirie and asks for her to surrender. It is eventually revealed that the entire story is a film produced by Fukuyama that he hopes to enter for the school festival.
20	"School Festival is Bravo!"; Transliteration: "Gakuensai wa Burabō!" (Japanese: 学園祭はブラボー!)	March 24, 2005
Yukinari and his friends attend the local school festival. However, the portal to Seiren opens once again and Maharu is sent to Earth. Koyomi and Tomoka lament on their duties, only for Maharu to chase them throughout the school. Maharu reconciles with Tomoka and Koyomi and later returns to Seiren.
21	"Sunny Afternoon Bravo!"; Transliteration: "Hareta Hi no Gogo wa Burabō!" (Japanese: 晴れた日の午後はブラボー!)	March 31, 2005
After a discussion involving the Seikon, a star mark, on Miharu's forehead, Koyomi thinks that she has spotted her father in the background of a news report. She attempts to search for him, but Hijiri Kanata kidnaps him.
22	"Present is Bravo!"; Transliteration: "Purezento wa Burabō!" (Japanese: プレゼントはブラボー!)	April 7, 2005
While Miharu goes gift shopping, chaos breaks loose at Yukinari's house as the Fukuyamas and main servants visit. Yukinari discovers he no longer gets an allergic reaction to girls. Because the girls can now touch him without triggering his reaction, Miharu feels like she is no longer needed after returning home. Hijiri lures Miharu back to Seiren.
23	"Bravo to Seiren!"; Transliteration: "Sēren e Burabō!" (Japanese: セーレンへブラボー!)	April 14, 2005
Yukina has Hijiri take Miharu back to Seiren. Koyomi discovers she has the star powers of transportation like her mother. Yukinari does not know what to do, but eventually musters the courage to go with his friends to rescue Miharu.
24	"Final Bravo!"; Transliteration: "Fainaru Burabō!" (Japanese: ファイナル·ブラボー!)	April 21, 2005
On Seiren, Yukinari, Kirie, Tomoka and the Fukuyamas enter Seiren and fight off Hijiri and the others. Meanwhile, Koyomi discovers that her father has been hypnotized and Kosame fights him. Yukinari makes his way towards Miharu and confronts Yukina, who reveals that her entire body is covered with the Seikon marks and that she is allergic to men. Therefore she wants to destroy the gates and rid the world of men, However, Yukinari accepts Yukina and tells her that she is loved because he was the same way before he met Miharu. In the epilogue, Miharu discovers that Yukina - who had gotten over her allergy - in Yukinari's bed. Koyomi and her father have reunited. Everyone gathers at Yukinari's home.

=== Video game ===
Kadokawa Shoten published a video game based on the series for the PlayStation 2 in 2005, entitled Girls Bravo Romance 15's (GIRLSブラボー Romance15's). The game received a CERO rating of "15 up".

== Reception ==
Chris Johnston of Newtype USA comments that "The 17+ rating is well-earned," and that "The raunchy, raucous humor is definitely not for young ones." Carlo Santos of Anime News Network writes "Girls Bravo has moments of promise as a screwball comedy, but as a whole, it falls victim to the same flaws of every other harem anime." Mania reviewer Chris Beveridge wrote "Though Girls Bravo does dip into some of the traditional elements of the harem anime design, it's naughtier and slightly raunchier take along is a welcome change for a lot of it." In his review Stig Høgset of THEM Anime Reviews wrote that "Characters get kicked, kneed in the face, stomped on and god knows what else" and that "the show is THICK with fan service that, while censored in the fansubs, might be VERY explicit in any potential future release."
