= Purikura Daisakusen =

1996 video game

Princess Kurara Daisakusen
- Developer: Atlus
- Publisher: Atlus
- Platforms: Arcade, Sega Saturn
- Release: Arcade: JP: October 1996; Saturn: JP: 15 November 1996
- Genre: Shooter/Platform
- Mode: Up to 2 players simultaneously
- Arcade system: Sega Titan Video (ST-V)

Purikura Daisakusen (プリクラ大作戦, Purikura Great Tactics) is an arcade game developed and published by Atlus. Purikura in this case is an abbreviation of "Princess Kurara" of the Power Instinct game series (not to be confused with the Purikura arcade machines by Atlus), who stars in this action shooter. It was released in the arcades in 1996 and received a Sega Saturn port later on in the year. The character designs were by You Shiina.

== Story ==
Peace in Miracle World, a kingdom ruled by the Queen Urara, was torn suddenly by the invasion of the "Scrap Empire" a realm of machines.

The Scrap Empire's leader turned all the citizens of Miracle World in animals. Being defenseless, the Queen was kidnapped.

Before being kidnapped, the Queen encommended Gray to find her little sisters and take care of the "Miracle Gem" a gem that is vital for the existence of Miracle World.

== Gameplay ==
The game is an isometric shooting game with two playable characters.

The gem that transforms Kurara, Kirara and Grey and brings them invincibility for a little bit of time.

== Characters ==
Kurara Apricot (クララ・アプリコット)
After completing her training in other world (in Power Instinct), Kurara returns to her homeland just to find that it has been conquered by the machines. Now she is determined to save her realm at any cost. Like in Power Instinct series, Kurara can transform into Super Kurara form and be invincible for a while, this same effect works for Kirara and Grey. Kurara Apricot is voiced by Masayo Kurata.

Kirara Apricot (キララ・アプリコット)
Kirara is the most immature of the Apricot sisters. She is not really conscious of the true danger of her mission and sees it as a way to have fun. Like her sister, she also can transform into a grown-up woman. Kirara Apricot is voiced by Tomoe Hanba.

Grey O'Brien (グレイ・オブライエン)
Grey is the leader of the Miracle World's army and Urara's boyfriend. Thanks to the power of the miracle gem he wasn't converted completely into an animal, but instead he was transformed in a half beast-half human being. Unlike Kurara and Kirara, who can transform into grown-up women with the power of the gems, Grey becomes his real form for a while. Grey O'Brien is voiced by Makiko Ohmoto.

Urara Apricot (ウララ・アプリコット)
Ruler of Miracle World and elder sister of Kurara and Kirara, and also Grey's girlfriend. She was kidnapped by Mr. Fargus, the Scrap Empire. Urara Apricot is voiced by Jun Mizusawa.

== Reception ==
Reception

Review score
Publication	Score
Famitsu	6/10, 4/10, 5/10, 6/10

Purikura Daisakusen has been considered by critics at Hobby Consolas as one of the best in the Saturn's library.

== See also ==
- Power Instinct
