= List of Gun X Sword characters =

The protagonists of Gun X Sword. From left to right: Yukiko, Carlos, Carmen 99, Jose, Wendy, Van, Priscilla, Joshua, Nero, Barrio and Ray.

This is a list of the fictional characters, with biographical details, in the Japanese anime Gun Sword (full name Gun x Sword: the "x" is silent) the story of which takes place on the fictional "Planet of Endless Illusion".

== Protagonists ==
=== Van ===
Voiced by: Takanori Hoshino (Japanese); David Vincent (English)

Van is the primary protagonist of the series. He is traveling the world, searching after a mysterious man with an artificial claw hand who killed his bride, Helena, on the day of their wedding. Van swore to kill this man to avenge Helena.

His primary weapon is a shape-memory cloth held at his side like a pistol. When an electrical charge is run through the weapon, it can change configuration to a dueling sword or extend to grapple or embed itself into walls. Van can also spin it in place from its hilt at high speed to act as an efficient shield against projectiles.

Through his travels he has been given several titles, including: "Van the Unemployed", "Van the Freeloader", "Hangover Van", "Steel Van", "Invincible Van", "Pretty Boy Van from the Garbage Dump", "Van the Unsung Hero who Gives It All He's Got", "Van of the Dawn" (his favorite), "Daybreak Van", "Nice Guy Van", "Van that Weird Guy who Helped Out", "Van of a Thousand Conquests", "Van of a Thousand Naps" (according to Joshua), "Van, The Devil in The Poisoned Tuxedo", and "Van the Devil's Swallowtail Suit". Although laconic and calm of nature, whenever information about the Claw's whereabouts are mentioned, he quickly shifts to extreme anger.

His white Armor, Dann of Thursday, or simply Dann, is held in place over the planet in a crucifix-shaped satellite, and is launched to his position when he twists his hat 180 degrees, holes varying in size form on his sword and then swings a 'V' with his sword in the air. It is one of the strongest armors on the planet, and uses a sword as its primary weapon. Due to Van's position as one of the "Original Seven" he needs to enter his armor once a week to regenerate. If he does not, he will fall ill and eventually die. In addition, Dann's regenerative abilities grant Van immortality as long as he rides periodically.

Van tries his best to remain uninvolved with those he meets along his way, and if he does help them, he does so out of public sight. He has an extremely low tolerance for alcohol, and drinks milk instead. When dining, he asks for all the available seasonings or all the condiments.

Although unexplained at first, he also possesses an unusual scar on his stomach; a circle split vertically down the center with seven lines radiating from the outside.

Van has a habit of forgetting the names of those he meets on his travels, especially Carmen, much to her chagrin. It wasn't until later that he begins to remember consistently. The first whose name he begins to remember is Wendy. The only person's name whom he does remember right away is Priscilla because she is a strong opponent which Van considers to be almost on the same level as him.

He is shown to still love his wife Helena even after her death and shows no romantic interest in anyone else.

He suddenly disappears without saying goodbye, and doesn't show up until a few years later, unwittingly meeting Wendy at her home.

=== Wendy Garret ===
Voiced by: Houko Kuwashima (Japanese); Stephanie Sheh (English)

Wendy is Van's first traveling companion and joins him to find her brother Michael Garret who had been kidnapped by the Claw. Wendy is kind, compassionate, and determined and often wishes to assist those in need of help that they meet during their travel, in contrast to Van's policy of leaving everybody to him/herself. Around her neck is a pink tortoise, Kameo, that serves as a good luck charm, given to her by her brother. In the first episode it does so by stopping an incoming bullet meant for her, which leaves it with a dent in its shell.

Wendy grew up in a town called Evergreen with her brother, whom she deeply cares for as he protected her from danger in her early childhood days. She carries her brother's gun which she retrieved after his kidnapping. The gun contains only one bullet, and Wendy does not use it until the final episode of the anime, ironically to shoot her brother.

A point constantly made in the series is Wendy's coming of age. She is often irritated when people put her aside as a child and she has attempted various times to be more adult-like in Van's presence from when he dismissed her as a brat in the first episode to go back to her town, and Wendy tells him to stop treating her as a child because she was ready to be his wife at any time. With each progression in the story, she begins to be more ladylike as she learns more about the world. When she finally finds her brother, she decides to continue journeying with Van to find out what is right or wrong and what is true happiness, especially when she finds that she cannot deny that the world the Claw envisioned was attractive to her. She eventually follows Yukiko in trying to help the others despite not being able to fight. Also, Wendy grows to refute Van's statements at times, standing for her beliefs instead of subsiding. At the end, before Van departs, he remarks to her about how she'd grown since the first time he'd seen her in Evergreen.

(An older Wendy is seen years later at the end of the series, retelling the events of the series to a reporter. By that time, Kameo had grown to the size of a coffee table and Wendy's cooking had become oriented towards how 'Van liked it', as she explains to the reporter. At that point, Van stumbles into her house unexpectedly, asking for some food and milk yet again, and the two stare at each other in shock.)

Her relationship with Van is another aspect as it presented her with a revenge-driven drifter who still managed to be kind. She goes to extensive lengths to take care of him and it has been hinted quite constantly that she has feelings for him. Wendy refers to Van as her hero in the beginning, but sheds that title from him as she learns more about him, growing closer and seeing him with his flaws and his hidden side; she refers to this part of him with a memory of 'how very sweet and precious he looked when he was like that' (Episode 16 preview).

=== Carmen 99 ===
Voiced by: Kikuko Inoue (Japanese); Michelle Ruff (English)

Carmen 99 (real name, Carol Mendosa) is a bright and self-sufficient intelligence agent/mercenary who Van and Wendy encounter in the second episode of the anime, although Van apparently has met her before. The nickname 'Carmen 99', comes both from her bust measurement (99 cm) and the number of hidden accessories she always carries. She is often looking for more ways to earn money.

Carmen grew up in the town of Trinolia with her uncle and his daughter (having lost her parents), both of whom she shared a close friendship with until she left the town. Throughout the series, Carmen frequently leaves Van and Wendy's company to later reunite with them, until she finally joins forces with them at the final stand to save the planet.

In the second to the last episode, she infiltrates the Claw's headquarters along with Yukiko, planting bombs along the way. Carmen winds up in a room filled with the flowers that devastated her hometown, where she confronts Fasalina, her nemesis, for the last time. While they fight, Carmen admits to being jealous of Fasalina's directness, freedom and innocent appearance, but declares that she would rather die than become like her. When the Claw dies, Fasalina begs Carmen to kill her. At first, Carmen is more than happy to do so, but when she finds Michael Garret running towards Fasalina, she spares both of them.

In the end, she also admits to liking Van very much after he finally remembers her name, though she laughs it off, before flying away.

=== Ray Lundgren ===
Voiced by: Takahiro Sakurai (Japanese); Liam O'Brien (English)
Ray is a withdrawn and ruthless Armor pilot whose wife, Shino, was killed by the Man with the claw hand. He first appears in episode 4 at the last minute, making his main appearance in episode 5 but is opposed at first to Van. Like Van, he travels to find the Man with the claw hand and exact his revenge by killing him. Unlike Van he has far fewer qualms over who dies by interfering with him, something Van despises and is easily provoked by. However, according to Joshua, he apparently was completely different in behavior prior to his wife's death. Later in the series he reveals that he seeks to kill the Claw and then die too in order to meet Yoshimo again. Like Van, he also abstains from alcohol, drinking water instead, though drinks it in a sake cup.

Near the end of the series his eyes are injured and his vision is blurred. His vision remains blurred until he is killed on episode 24 while he tries to kill the Claw Man, his gunshots becoming more erratic with his deteriorating vision. His final shot temporarily derails the Claw's plans by lodging itself in the timer used by the Claw Man to activate his plan. He is then killed by security vehicles and falls down the steps. He is seen in his last scene in a sort of dream sequence where Shino is still alive and he remarks on the 'strange dream' he had before being reunited with her.

His rivalry with Van stems from the fact that both of them want to kill the Claw. Later in the series, they work together, although they show little concern for each other, even when engaged in combat with enemies.

Ray's primary weapon is a katana-shaped gun with a large magazine where the blade would be. He holds it just ahead of the hilt and spins a disc on the chamber to fire streams of bullets. He has several hidden weapons, such as the heels of his shoes. One acts as a very small hand held gun, while the other provides a way of summoning, remote-controlling, and self-destructing Volkan.

In many ways he is both very similar and opposite to Van. They both use Armors their wives worked on, completely dedicated to kill the Claw because he killed their wives, and are weak to alcohol. Where they are opposite is where Van wears a more western style, Ray wears more of a samurai style, Van uses a sword that looks like a gun, and Ray uses a gun that looks like a sword, Van focuses more on close combat where Ray fights with long distance, and finally Van summons his Armor from the sky where Ray summons his from the ground.

Last words: "Thank you...Josh."

=== Joshua Lundgren ===
Voiced by: Junko Noda (Japanese); Yuri Lowenthal (English)
Joshua is Ray's brother and is talkative, upbeat and sociable. Though he deeply cares for Ray, he is entirely different in behavior than his older brother. Joshua claims his brother changed to his present behavior after his wife, Shino, died at the hands of the Claw, and although he also loved Shino, he wishes for Ray to accept her death and return home instead of exacting his revenge on her killer. Joshua has great technical skills, being able to repair numerous everyday items, analyze armor weaknesses, and even set up timed explosives. Joshua is somewhat dense when it concerns females, however, since he just walks in on Priscilla when she was taking a shower, and entered a women's restroom to find Wendy in a train station.

When he and Wendy first meet, they instantly get along, probably because they share so much in common. However, Van finds Joshua very annoying, and when Joshua is hospitalized after being injured when Ray confronts the Claw for the first time in the series, Van leaves Joshua behind. however, Joshua manages to catch up with help from Carmen 99, and they rejoin Van and Wendy for the final showdown.

When Ray is killed, Joshua rushes to his aid, only to find himself captured by the Claw. However, before Yukiko can bust him out, he has already escaped, vowing to put a stop to the plan his older brother managed to stall before dying, and saves Yukiko as well. He is instrumental in the final battle as he succeeds in cutting power to Birthday thereby halting the Claw's plans.

=== The El Dorado Five ===
Nero Voiced by: Masaharu Satō (Japanese); Michael Sorich (English)
Josè Voiced by: Motomu Kiyokawa (Japanese); Michael Forest (English)
Carlos Voiced by: Takashi Taguchi (Japanese); William Frederick Knight (English)
Barrio Voiced by: Katsuhisa Hōki (Japanese); Harry Molloy (English)

The El Dorado Five consist of four aging but boisterous Armor pilots, Nero, Josè, Carlos, and Barrio. They spend their days reminiscing about past battles, which annoys the rest of their town to no end (because they believe they are making it all up for attention), fueled by their great liking for alcohol. The fifth member, Chizuru, has already died. Each of their animal-themed Armors can unite into a one gigantic mech (Legs, Torso, Head and Shoulders, Arms, Backpack) called El Dorado Five, which possess great strength and power. The inn they frequently visit is managed by Yukiko, Chizuru's granddaughter.

Van and Wendy first meet them in their home town boasting about their deeds as armor pilots. When the town is attacked by a scientist who feels himself neglected by the town community, they arrive on the scene, but are incomplete since only four of the armors are connected together. Van remedies this, after a scathing comment, by taking Chizuru's Armor and hurling it at their armor where it connects and finally unites it into the El Dora Five for the first time in many years and defeat the villain. After this incident, their respect in the eyes of the town youngsters rises considerably. Later they also join Van's company to defeat the Claw and save the world, claiming that not many people get the opportunity to do so. After they help Van and Dann blast off into space to regenerate, they claim that Van is their "student" and that they would name him El Dora Dann.

A comic trait is that Carlos is nearly always asleep, even when the group is engaged in the most ferocious battles. He does, however, wake up occasionally, and provides good advice when he does. During the final battle, their Armor is seriously damaged and the power fails. Carlos then wakes up completely, as the others admit defeat, and activates a backup power system before leading the last attack on Birthday's defenses, and helping Van get the finishing blow.

Their "secret base", stereotypical speech, distinct characteristics (Nero as the hot-blooded main pilot; Jose as the cool rival and foil to Nero; Barrio as the 'big guy'; Carlos possibly as the pint-sized genius technician; and Yukiko as the token girl) uniting mechs and colorful costumes are a loving homage of super robot and Super Sentai team shows. Their final form is an homage to GaoGaiGar.

When they defeat an enemy, they turn their back on their opponent, pose, and yell out "ADIOS, AMIGO!!!"

=== Priscilla ===
Voiced by: Saeko Chiba (Japanese); Carrie Savage (English)

Priscilla is a pink-haired girl who met Van for the first time in an Armor battle tournament. She loves to pilot her Armor and gives all the prize money she wins to the efforts of her sister, Johanna, in raising orphans. Both were raised by a former Armor pilot-turned-nun who was the original owner of Brownie, Priscilla's Armor. She controls her armor through a control interface system implanted in her lower spine, which allows her movements to be directly mimicked by her Armor, thus taking advantage of her athletic abilities. Priscilla is a firm believer in fair play, and refused a big company's bribe to throw a championship fight. Her personality is somewhat naïve and is almost always cheerful. She later joins Van's company and also gains a crush on him, much to Wendy's chagrin. She is not afraid to show her feelings for Van. The El Dorado Five even once enthusiastically encouraged her to propose a marriage to him, seeing her strong feelings. Priscilla settled on a first date instead, since it was too soon to be considering marriage. In the end, her date is postponed when Van suddenly departs after fulfilling his mission to kill the Claw and avenge his wife. Priscilla vows to one day find him and have that date.

Another thing which seems to irritate Wendy (and Carmen), is that Van managed to remember Priscilla's name almost right away after their first meeting, while he didn't manage to remember Carmen's name before the very last episode.

=== Yukiko Steavens ===
Voiced by: Satsuki Yukino (Japanese); Megan Hollingshead (English)

Yukiko is the owner of the inn "Pink Amigo" in the El Dorado Five's hometown. She is the granddaughter of the late Chizuru Steavens, one of the members of the El Dorado Five. Yukiko has a soft spot for the remaining members and the sound of her beautiful voice always calms them down when they are about to create a ruckus.

When the El Dorado Five join Van's company to save the world, she decides to go as well to care for the aging group. She acts as the cook during that period of time.

In the last two episodes, she accompanies Carmen 99 as they infiltrate the Clawed Man's headquarters to find Joshua after he was imprisoned. She was almost captured herself, but was saved by Joshua, who had already escaped. Toting a stolen rifle, Yukiko then guards him as he hacks into the system and cuts the power, and also provides him with moral support when he reminisces about Ray.

== Antagonists ==
=== The Claw ===
Voiced by: Kenyu Horiuchi (Japanese); Kirk Thornton (English)
The Claw, whose real name is never revealed, is a mastermind with a prosthetic claw for a right hand and is the primary antagonist of the series. He killed both Van's and Ray's wives, and is the subject of their furious lust for revenge. Before episode 12, he is only shown in flashbacks as a shadowy figure with a claw in place of his right hand. In episode 12 however, Wendy runs into a kind old man who helps her in overcoming her sorrow for her brother. Immediately after the conversation, it is revealed that this man is the Claw the group had been looking for when Fasalina delivers his claw prosthetic to him, replacing the ordinary-looking hand he had attached beforehand.

It has been confirmed that the Claw killed the Original Seven pilots and replaced them with his own. It is known, however, that he did assassinate individuals with the potential knowledge and abilities to stop him. Helena and Shino, Van and Ray's wives respectively, were two such victims.

Later in the series, it is revealed he plans to create a new world which supposedly will bring happiness to all people and eradicate all sins one has committed during life, regardless of whether the people want it or not, and totally ignoring those who were already happy to begin with. His plan apparently is to change the world by dissolving himself and then combining with everyone and everything on the planet on a subconscious level, perhaps acting as a sort of conscience for people. It is never made clear what exactly would happen to civilization or to himself, nor how the process would occur. It was described by Wendy as 'mental terrorism'.

Near the end of the series, it is revealed the planet's moon, as controlled by Birthday, could be used as a terraformer. The Claw Man hints that he intends to terraform the Endless Illusion into the perfect world he dreams of. It is implied that the entire population of the planet will be killed during the process and will be reborn in the new world. It is unclear whether this rebirth is possible as the Claw is very clearly insane.

The plan was also violently opposed by some of his crew members, claiming he was planning on committing genocide. In one of the episodes they attempt to commit a coup against him in order to force him into revealing the details for his plans. During the negotiations, the Claw seems to strongly prefer talk instead of violence, insisting that genocide is not part of his plans. This pacifism and goodwill is debatable, as minutes later, he kills one of the rebels by hugging him (apparently of love) while slashing his back with the claw. When he relinquishes him and discovers he is dead, he breaks into shock, saying "I did it again", and repeatedly apologizing, as if unaware of his embrace being lethal for the rebel. He also shows very little sadness and is somewhat indifferent whenever one of the Original Seven is killed by Van or Ray, maintaining that as long as he has the DNA samples of each pilot, his plan will succeed.

To realize his plans, he gathers a society of loyal and devoted followers (including Wendy's brother Michael and Van's mentor Gadved), six of whom are pilots of the Original Seven save Dann of Thursday. Within this society he is only known as "The Comrade".

He wears simple clothes most of the time, despite being the leader. In the final episodes however he replaced this with a white outfit with a chain which leads from his collar down. This is later seen to be the standard uniform of the scientists when Michael sees their remains, all of them wearing the same sort of clothing. He also is shown to like gardening, and the company of animals. In general, he is shown to engage in creative and nurturing activities. Though he appears to be a kind and somewhat absent-minded old man, the Claw is actually very insane and does not admit to any kind of wrongdoing, despite the fact that nearly all of his actions have caused death and misery to innocents. He always rationalizes his acts as being ultimately for the good of mankind. Another driving force to his insanity is due to his impending death, probably brought about by an illness.

It was revealed later in Episode 23 that the Claw managed to escape the Mother Planet 'Earth' along with a collection of other people. Apparently, they loved each other at first, but they eventually all went insane from their prolonged isolation and began killing each other, leaving only the Claw left. This is what inspired him to "make the world a peaceful place with my own hands".

A little known fact is that the world known as the "Endless Illusion" was once a prison planet with the Original Seven Armors acting as 'wardens.' The Comrade had been present during the planet's fall and evolution into its present state. Not wanting to see more misery and pain to the world, he decided to become the population's 'conscience,' and embarks on a plan to assimilate himself into everyone's sub-conscious.

His plan is halted before its completion when Van and his allies stop the process and the Claw meets his end as Van cuts him in half with his sword. During the final battle, the Claw shows the scope of his insanity by saying things like 'Amazing! I have so many new friends!' and finally 'Van... I really like you' before Van slices him in half.

Super Robot Wars K has confirmed The Claw Man's real name to be Koo Krying Kroo (クー・クライング・クルー), William Woo's father.

=== Michael Garret ===
Voiced by: Sōichirō Hoshi (Japanese); Johnny Yong Bosch (English)

Michael Garret is Wendy Garret's older brother and was her only remaining family member in Evergreen after her parents died. When they were younger, he cared very much for her, protecting her when their town of Evergreen was assaulted by bandits. He is later kidnapped by the Claw, and Wendy joins Van in order to rescue him. However, when she finally finds him, it proves out he no longer is kept with the Claw against his will. He reveals that he has joined forces with him in order to realize the Claw's dream of eradicating all sorrow on the planet by creating a new world.

Like his sister, he is usually kind and compassionate, but can be fiercely independent when he wants to. Although he has freely joined the Claw, he still has his doubts and struggles to rid himself of his suspicious feelings against the project he has joined, especially when a mutinous group attempts to rebel and they try to get Michael to join them. But in the end, he chooses to stay with the Claw and Fasalina, with whom he ends up sharing a deep bond.

Michael is one of the only member of The Original Seven along with Woo who is able to control an "Original Armor" without needing surgical implants embedded into his body. This is the main reason why the Claw chose him, and Michael later proves out to be a vital part of the Claw's plan.

He pilots the Original Seven Armor Saudade of Sunday, which was launched into space and destroyed two of the Original Seven satellites. There, he encounters Van and the two of them battle, with Van constantly reminding Michael about Wendy. Whether this is a diversion tactic or Van genuinely cares very much about Wendy, it enrages Michael and he blames Van in turn for making Wendy leave Evergreen. Their fight is interrupted by an explosion brought about by the moon and the liquid-state material surrounding it, but continues when they return to the Planet of Endless Illusion, where Van also continues to scold and taunt Michael for not being a good brother. In the end, Michael is defeated and Saudade destroyed.

In the penultimate episode, he and Wendy meet again, and when he tells her to step aside as he still has to complete his mission, she points his own gun towards him, answering that he's not the only one with a mission to complete. She ultimately shoots him in the arm when he keeps on going, using up the last bullet in the gun. Wendy begins to explain the negative effects of the Claw's plan, which only makes Michael even angrier. He then tries to strangle her out of rage, but Wendy is saved by Kameo biting Michael's hand. Even so, he still saves her from being crushed by falling debris, and the two siblings come to an understanding and part ways, with Michael leaving his gun with Wendy and advising her to follow her own path, while he follows his. He and his lover Fasalina seemingly perish after a boulder falls on top of them, though this is not confirmed.

Armor: Saudade of Sunday resembles an energy handgun

=== Fasalina ===
Voiced by: Masayo Kurata (Japanese); Karen Strassman (English)

Fasalina is extremely loyal to the Claw and is his right-hand woman, and will do anything to protect both him and his dream. Before being recruited, she worked as a prostitute, and is eternally grateful for being offered the opportunity to work for the Claw. When battling in her Armor, Fasalina often taunts her opponents by being very flirtatious, thereby bringing them out of focus. She also pole dances with her staff to control her Armor. She later develops a romantic relationship with Michael and becomes a faithful supporter of him.

When not fighting inside her armor, she uses a staff which can extend, bend or contract at her will. Carmen 99 develops a glowing animosity against Fasalina later in the series, for Fasalina corrupted Carmen's hometown with poisonous flowers and was indirectly responsible for the death of the latter's best friend. When the Claw is killed by Van, and the former prostitute is defeated by Carmen in their own final showdown, Fasalina begs for Carmen to kill her, after losing all of her will to live. She is later reunited with Michael only to seemingly perish with him when a boulder lands on top of them. Whether or not they had survived is in question, since they are never seen afterward.

Armor: Dahlia of Wednesday resembles a staff

=== Gadved ===
Voiced by: Kazuhiko Kishino (Japanese); Dan Woren (English)

Gadved was once a good friend of Van and Helena, as both Helena and Gadved worked researching the Original Seven armors. On the tragic wedding day when Van and Helena was critically injured by the Claw, a dying Helena asked Gadved to permanently make Van "Dann of Thursday"'s pilot, thereby making him a member of the Original Seven. In the series, Van discovers to his enormous shock that Gadved has become one of the Claw's followers. He also reveals that he was the one who told the Claw where to find Van's wife. He is a veteran Armor pilot and the last surviving member of the former generation of Original Seven pilots which he says had become corrupted, especially after the fall of the Mother Planet Earth. He is the first of the pilots to be killed by Van after they both agree to share the same dream, and the outcome of their battle was to prove who had the better conviction. In end, Van won out. Gadved, like most Original Seven Armor riders, possesses a memory-cloth weapon, in his case one shaped like an axe.

Armor: Diablo of Monday resembles an axe.

=== Carossa ===
Voiced by: Makiko Ohmoto (Japanese); Sterling Beaumon (English)

Carossa is a member of the Claw's society and twin brother of Melissa, though far more aggressive and rash than her. Whenever they are together it is always he who takes the initiative. Both he and Melissa were orphans and as such he has developed a deep need for attention, especially from the Claw. He is also very protective of his sister and will attack anyone who scares her or makes her cry. Nearly from the beginning, he develops a growing sense of animosity of Michael, partly because he becomes the center of the Claw's attention (due to his importance in his plan) and partly because Melissa develops a crush on him. Both siblings are members of the Original Seven and appear to be the result of research using a mental link between twins. Ray mercilessly kills both of them with his rifle during their attempt to delay the protagonists' approach to the Claw.

Armor: Sin of Friday resembles a tonfa.

=== Melissa ===
Voiced by: Chiwa Saitō (Japanese); Megan Harvey (English)

Melissa is Carossa's twin sister. She is easily frightened but is far more reasonable and cautious than her brother. She later gains a crush on Michael, much to Carossa's chagrin. When in armor battle, she and Carossa operate in sync, allowing them to seamlessly combine into one armor for greater strength and defense. The two are also the final product of twin genome project in the wind valley city.

Armor: Sen of Saturday resembling a chakram

=== Woo ===
Voiced by: Mitsuaki Madono (Japanese); Dameon Clarke (English)

Woo (full name, William Will Woo) is a member of the Original Seven and heir to a noble family. He appears cold and collected on the outside, but is filled with rage and turmoil on the inside. Woo suffers from an Oedipus complex. He regarded his father as an adversary and competitor for the exclusive love of his mother. When Woo was an adolescent, he attacked his father with a knife in an attempt to kill him, but his mother jumped in the way and was killed. After that, Woo left the township his family had governed due to the painful memories, and left it to succumb to decay. However he says he returned to this place to intercept Van, and that this proved he had finally succeeded. Woo had become increasingly mentally unstable since then and seeks to unleash his pent-up rage in any way he can. He also calls Van and Gadved 'old types'. Van kills him after luring him towards Dann on top of his castle and they clash in a fight of wills where it is revealed that Woo 'abandoned his mother for his father's sake' (This, along with silhouettes of his parents shown in flashbacks, suggest that his father was the Claw). Van then challenges this by saying that no one who abandons their true love can defeat him.

In Super Robot Wars K, it is confirmed that the Claw was indeed his father.

Armor: Metsä of Tuesday resembles a fencing sword.

== The Original Seven ==
"Armor" is the term used in the series to refer to any kind of giant, pilotable mecha, typically designed for combat purposes. Armor pilots are known as "Armor riders."

Among the wide variety of Armors, there are seven unique units that are far more powerful than others, known as "The Original Seven Armors." They are named after the seven days of the week and are piloted by people who are picked out for the task for each generation, known as "The Original Seven". Many of these riders are given special implants in order to be able to control their Armor, but some of them are born with this ability and are considered more important. The Original Seven Armors also differ from ordinary Armors because they are contained in crucifix-shaped satellites in space when they are not in use, one station for each of the Armors. Here, they are refueled and repaired and can be summoned down to their owner at their leisure. When the Armor is summoned, it takes the shape of a giant version of a certain weapon, typically the Armor and its rider's weapon of choice, but in battle they change into a humanoid form. All Original Seven units have a blue-black liquid called G.E.R. fluid that permeates the entire armor. It runs through the body of the mecha like blood, seeping out of any wounds that the armor sustains in combat. It also fills the cockpit, able to accept neural inputs and impart healing abilities to the pilot's injuries when they are connected. The normally blue-black flow of G.E.R. fluid in the cockpit becomes a bright, iridescent white if a pilot is especially in tune with his or her Armor.

Gadved eventually reveals to Van that originally the Original Seven were the guardians of the Endless Illusion, a planet "at the very bottom of the universe", used as a prison by "Mother" Earth. However they became corrupt over the coming generations and ignored their duties. With the destruction of Mother Earth, this became more extreme. Gadved also states that Van's ability to access Dann's pilot healing feature is the reason Dann of Thursday was the "strongest armor" in existence. Whether this includes Saudade of Sunday and Birthday, which were not active at the time, is not clear. It is also not clear if all of the Original Seven could heal their pilots or if said pilots could access this ability successfully. Gadved is the only remaining member from the previous generation, the others, according to him, were killed by the Claw so his own pilots could be used as part of his plan.

=== Saudade of Sunday ===
Pilot: Michael Garret

Saudade of Sunday was retrieved from the sunken ruins of a city in episode 10, therefore, it is the only Original Seven armor without a satellite station. It is hinted that this was because being an experimental or stronger Armor; they could not control its power and its satellite station ended up underwater because of it. When it is in its compact form it has the appearance of a gigantic gun. In humanoid form, it sprouts several large wings which functions as large solar panels, thus allowing Saudade to function without continuous refueling unlike the other Original Seven Armors. Saudade wields a large sword with a gun at the hilt which fires energy beams.

Saudade is later launched into space and to the moon as part of the Claw's scheme, but calculations showed that there was a 20% chance of it colliding with Dann of Thursday's base, and the satellite was destroyed because of it. Later, Saudade also destroyed Diablo of Monday's satellite station when it was reentering the planet after Dann used it to recharge. A battle between the two armors ensues, interrupted by an explosion brought about by the Claw's plan.

Saudade was the first to reenter the Endless Illusion's atmosphere in episode 24 in pretty good condition. It launches into another attack against Dann when the latter returns and threatens the Birthday and the Claw. In the second and final confrontation, Dann of Thursday slashes a V into Saudade and destroys it, much to Michael's disbelief, since Saudade of Sunday was supposed to be the most advanced of the Original Seven Armors. Saudade, along with Sen of Saturday, possesses gold armor instead of the typical grey-white of most of the other Original Seven.

=== Diablo of Monday ===
Pilot: Gadved

In appearance, Diablo is a bulkier version of Van's Armor, Dann of Thursday, and appears in episode 12, where Gadved fought Van. It appears to be slightly stronger than Van's armor, although it is unknown if this due to Gadveds longer experience in piloting or the Diablo itself.

In its compact form it resembles a giant axe and it therefore wields a halberd in its humanoid form. It was defeated by Dann of Thursday with Van's greater drive and conviction. Later near to the end of the series Dann of Thursday used Diablo's satellite to repair itself after Saudade of Sunday destroyed Dann's storage satellite while on its way to the Moon. Diablo's satellite station was destroyed when Saudade of Sunday was reentering the planet's surface.

=== Metsä of Tuesday ===
Pilot: William Will Woo

Metsä is a slender armor which first appears in episode 15, where it does battle with Van and his armor Dann. In its compact form, Metsä takes the shape of an enormous lance, wielding a rapier in humanoid form.

During the first battle, Dann is no match against Metsä due to Van's inexperience in using the mech's electromagnetic shield and other capabilities. Van then descends into a sort of depressing mood playing endlessly with a rotating puzzle Gadved had given him to prepare him for piloting the Original Seven. He finally solves it by thinking of Helena and her love (more accurately, it was solved by emptying his mind of all thought of the puzzle itself, essentially making the puzzle a part of his body in his mind). By using the puzzle's solution in piloting Dann, Van unlocked the complete abilities of the Armor. This makes the rematch take a complete reversal. In the rematch, it is more will than strength which proves the outcome as both of them challenge each other about their 'loves'. Van pushes Metsä down through Will's 'sanctuary' and it falls onto its back, with its own lance striking the middle. This causes it to explode.

Metsä means "forest" in Finnish.

=== Dahlia of Wednesday ===
Pilot: Fasalina

Dahlia is Fasalina's unique Armor which she reveals in episode 20. In its compact form it is shaped as a three-part staff and accordingly wields a similar weapon in humanoid form. Dahlia is very agile and has speed to match, despite its appearance. Fasalina controls it by swinging around a pole installed in the cockpit of the armor (referring to her life as a prostitute before joining the Claw), which is also her staff.

Dahlia possesses some unconventional weapons as it can fire a burst of its own G.E.R. fluid against the enemy Armor, effectively binding them since the liquid solidifies on contact. Another unique weapon is its ability to create tendrils of G.E.R. fluid from its chest for close range combat. It can also fire rocket missiles for long range combat, and even use camouflage to evade or surprise an enemy, as Dahlia looks very much like a large flower.

During its fight with Dann of Thursday, it was almost destroyed until it was kicked out of the way by the El Dorado Five. However, during its second fight, Ray and Vulcan destroy her mech's arm and body with Vulcan's guns at point-blank range, thereby crippling Dahlia forever. Dahlia is one of three Original Seven Armors with a unique coloration, the armor on its body being a shade of pink.

=== Dann of Thursday ===
Pilot: Van

Dann is Van's armor, built along the same lanky proportions as Van himself. In compact form it resembles a giant sword and thus wields a huge sword in humanoid form, from which a smaller knife can be separated. A giant blade is mounted on its back, and can provide limited flight capabilities similar to rocket propulsion. Dann is one of the few Armors which possesses no long range attacks, and it depends entirely on Van's movements and swordsmanship in order to inflict damage on its opponents. In the beginning of the series, Van has not learned to activate all of Dann's power yet, but by the last episode he has discovered how to utilize Dann's electromagnetic shield, which greatly improves Dann's odds against a long range-attacking opponent. Later towards the end of the series Dann's satellite station was shot down by Saudade of Sunday during its rocket to the Moon because of the chances Saudade might have collided with the satellite station, therefore stopping Dann from repairing itself after its battle with Dahlia of Wednesday. Dann later repairs itself using Diablo of Monday's satellite station which is later destroyed by Saudade of Sunday. In the end, Dann is stored in another of the remaining satellites, though is not mentioned which one.

Most unusual is its ability to instantly heal injuries or illnesses that Van has, including hangovers, once he enters the cockpit. Furthermore, it also has an Overdrive ability which can emit a highly devastating beam of supercharged G.E.R. fluid which cuts like a giant sword, although it is hinted that this ability is Van's and not Dann's. Van, as a result of a special surgery, is symbiotically linked with Dann and is required to interface with the Armor at least once per week. If he does not, he will eventually fall ill as if with a bad fever and die. Accordingly, if either Van dies or Dann is destroyed, the other will cease to exist.

=== Sin of Friday ===
Pilot: Carossa

Sin, along with its sister armor Sen, differs from the other Original Seven because it has a nonhumanoid structure. In its compact form it is in the shape of a tonfa, while in its battle state, it is hunched backwards with large hind legs and a tail. When battling it wields a tonfa which can morph into different weapons. Sin and Sen can combine into a single Armor to increase their attack and defense, but can just as easily separate again. It can also fire energy beams at an extremely rapid rate and is protected by an electromagnetic shield. It is destroyed along with its pilot by Vulcan's beam howitzer.

=== Sen of Saturday ===
Pilot: Melissa

Sen is Sin's sister armor, but smaller. In its battle state it is more humanoid than its sibling but the head is very alien looking. In its compact form it resembles a chakram, which is also its weapon when in battle form. The chakram is a deadly ring which can be thrown against an enemy and pierce its armor and will return to its owner like a boomerang. Sen can interlock with Sin to a single armor, where Sen resides in the interior and bottom section, protected by the stronger and bigger Sin. Like Sin, it can fire energy beams and is protected by an electromagnetic shield. It is destroyed by Vulcan's beam howitzer. Sen is one of three Original Seven Armors with a unique armor color, possessing the same pale gold as Saudade of Sunday.

== Other armors ==
=== Vulcan ===
Vulcan, (pronounced "Volkein") is Ray's Armor and was built by his late bride Shino, who was killed by the Claw. It is armed with a long-range rifle, a strong handgun that is fired by connecting a pressurized hose to the Armor's power source, a gatling gun, and missiles from its back. In contrast to Van's armor, Ray summons Vulcan by repeatedly firing his gun downwards into the ground to trace out a circle around himself, signaling where it will rise from underground encased within a transport. The shell also serves to protect him while shooting his rifle long-range. Vulcan also has an extremely powerful beam howitzer capable of punching through an Original Seven's electromagnetic shields, but it has one major setback; it takes a long time to charge. Ray has also equipped Vulcan with a special energy dissipating cloak which absorbs energy blasts, giving him a huge advantage against other armors using energy weaponry. When not in combat it moves in a large drilling vehicle which can burst up from the ground wherever Ray summons it. It also includes a self-destruct feature which Ray can activate with one of his shoes.

It is later revealed that Vulcan served as an inspiration for the construction of beam weapons on five of the Original Seven Armors (excluding Dann and Saudade, both not in the Claw's possession at the time), since Shino worked with the people that designed the Original Seven, though was not present when they were being constructed and upgraded. The weapons were actually recent additions, only being added after the Claw recruited the Original Seven for his own purposes.

=== Metal Guru ===
The armor appeared in episode 2, and resembled a battleship with a vast humanoid torso attached. Metal Guru was commanded by Baron Mayor of the bridge city in order to conquer the world. Its main attacks were the use of its gigantic arms and the Regulus Cannon, a turret that sprayed molten metal over its opponents. Van managed to destroy Metal Guru by throwing Dann's sword through into the regulus cannon then used his foot to push on it sending the sword through the center and back out the other side.

=== El Dorado ===
El Dorado is an older Armor piloted by the El Dorado Five. When the series start, they have not used it for many years, but they finally use it when the safety of their hometown is threatened. El Dorado is composed of five separate smaller mechas which combine into one Armor, known as "El Dora Five", though they can combine without the support backpack to create the weaker "El Dora Four". In order for it to activate its most powerful mode, all five must be interlocked. The armor mostly relies on hand-to-hand combat but is also capable of missile attacks and launching powerful special moves. El Dorado depletes its energy fast and therefore does not last long in prolonged battle without Chizuru's "support unit". Later in the series El Dorado is upgraded into the El Dora Soul, gaining power but losing its ability to separate.

In the final showdown, the El Dorado Five helps Priscilla and Brownie take down the incoming One-on-Ones, armors at the Clawed Man's disposal. Near the end, El Dora Soul hurls Dann of Thursday like a javelin towards the Birthday after the shield around it was deactivated, so that Dann could finish off the Birthday.

El Dora Five (and by extension El Dora Soul) carries a striking resemblance to GaoGaiGar and Dancouga. Its final attack is a homage of GaoGaiGar's Hell and Heaven attack.

=== Brownie ===
Brownie is Priscilla's rabbit-themed Armor, first shown in episode 14 when Van is to face Priscilla in a battle tournament. At first, Brownie is only equipped with a large electrically charged spear. During the tournament, Priscilla's main strategy is to dodge her enemies' attacks (using her athletics) waiting for the right moment to attack the opponent's weak point with the spear in a final blow known as "The Pixie Stab". It can also create a strong wind current creating a dust storm in the arena, which Priscilla uses to hide.

In addition to the base unit, Priscilla installs a set of "heavy" armor on to Brownie for the tournament. The armor adds a pair of sharp blades to the knees that can be used in dashing slash attacks, but most importantly the equipment reduces Brownie's speed significantly. This is used to confuse opponents when they try to gauge the true speed and power of the armor. After Van manages to fend off Priscilla effectively, she removes Brownie's heavy armor and battles in her true form.

When Priscilla rejoins Van on the Claw's base, Brownie appears with several additional forms of weaponry. A long-range cabled spike, similar to the close range Fairy Stab, has been mounted on its right elbow. Also, Vulcan cannons were added to Brownie's shoulders to provide light ranged fire. The most unusual addition is seen when Priscilla fights one of the Claw's One-on-One automated armors: Brownie attacks by flying butt-first, shooting a tail-mounted gun-pod.

=== S-Drive Dragon ===
First appeared in episode 8, the S-Drive Dragon resembles a metallic Chinese dragon. As well as being able to hover through the air, it used a powerful water-jet cutter from its mouth and a constricting attack to overcome any who tried to cross the mountains where it lay. The S-Drive designation referred to a set of solar panels on the spine of the dragon that would store energy from the sun. When the dragon was finally defeated, Van and Ray discover that the armor was unmanned; the Rider inside had died long ago.

Van's team is ambushed by a pair of automated Dragons when they attempt to pass through the underwater tunnel leading to the Claws's base. These two dragons are armed differently, as instead of using the hydro cutter of the first dragon they attack primarily with a pair of head mounted beam cannons. These two were dispatched by Brownie and El Dora Soul.

Finally, a fourth Dragon armor is used by Zapiero Muttaaca's rebel force as they try to escape from the Claw. It also attacks using the twin beam cannons, as well as unleashing a missile barrage against Saudade of Sunday from multiple back-mounted launchers. Zapiero Muttaaca's Dragon was destroyed by Michael during this encounter.

=== Golden Cradle ===
After Van sees through Joe's deception in episode 7, Joe summons Golden Cradle to do battle against Dann. Golden Cradle looks like a large medieval knight, with a massive cross-bearing shield and large lance as its primary armaments. Its face is half-covered by a golden helmet, the other half revealing a robotic skull face. Despite its heavily armored appearance, the Golden Cradle is reasonably agile and able to duel with Dann to some degree.

After slicing open Joe's outer cockpit, Van manages to severely wound the Golden Cradle by blinding Joe with a well-reflected beam of sunlight and slashing through the armor's shield in the confusion. Joe self-destructs Golden Cradle, depriving Van of any information regarding the Claw.

The Golden Cradle design is seen again when Van's team journeys to the Claw's secret base. Several automated green colored versions, called One-on-Ones, form the outer defense line of the Claw Man's facilities. The One-on-One version is armed with a set of shield-mounted machine guns in addition to its large melee lance. Their autopilot is seemingly crude and predictable, as Priscilla is able to anticipate its movements and destroy them handily.

The controls of this particular armor is different from most of the other ordinary armors, the pilot needs only to put his hands on the two orbs in the cockpit to control the armor, presumably using only thoughts.

=== Birthday (Big Brain) ===
The ultimate Armor designed by the people who escaped from Earth, the Mother Planet, which supposedly surpassed the Original Seven. It controlled the moon of the Endless Illusion, which was actually a giant satellite used to escape from Earth by a group of scientists. It is crucial to the Claw's plot, who pilots it himself and fights against Dann of Thursday several times. Inside it is just a large room full of golden fluid instead of the traditional blue with a pillar which the Claw Man only has to lie in to control. Its prime defense is the 'Guardian Curtain' which is a curtain made of energy surrounding it. This was destroyed by Brownie and El Dora Five continuously attacking it.

It is very strong, as demonstrated when it managed to almost crush Dann of Thursday with both hands, cracking the armor. It can also utilize the liquid system in the satellite to shoot streams of energy from orbit (This was later also copied by Dann who did something similar forming a sort of lance from the energy to attack with). It is immobile and appears like a gigantic smiling face with two large hands on the side. It also stores the countdown timer for the Claw's final plan (A huge upright combination lock type pillar with the reels turning, similar in design to the puzzle Van carries around). It was momentarily stopped by Ray's final shot which rebounded off the Claw's prosthetic hand and embeds itself between the reels effectively stopping the countdown at the last minute.

In the end, with the help of the El Dorado Five and Joshua Lundgren (who hacked the system causing a power failure), Dann destroys the shield around Birthday before jumping up and slicing it cleanly in half.

== Sources ==
- Detailed information on characters and screenshots
