= Capcom Cup 2017 =

- 2017
- Logo

Tournament information
- Sport: Street Fighter V
- Location: Anaheim, California
- Dates: December 8–10, 2017
- Tournament format(s): Double elimination
- Venue(s): Anaheim Hilton Hotel and Anaheim Convention Center
- Participants: 32
- Purse: US$350,000

Final positions
- Champion: MenaRD
- Runner-up: Tokido

Capcom Cup 2017 was a Street Fighter V video game tournament that was held in December 2017. 32 players qualified for the tournament by scoring high on the game's leaderboards during the 2017 Capcom Pro Tour. The tournament spanned three days during the PlayStation Experience weekend, and took place in the Anaheim Hilton Hotel and Anaheim Convention Center. The first day of the tournament featured a Last Chance qualifier, which was won by newcomer Naoki "Nemo" Nemoto. The finals were won by Dominican newcomer Saul Leonardo Mena "MenaRD" Segundo, who defeated Hajime "Tokido" Taniguchi in the final match.

== Capcom Pro Tour ==
The Capcom Cup was the final tournament of the 2017 season of professional Street Fighter V competitions, the Capcom Pro Tour. Players could qualify for the 2017 Capcom Cup by competing in the fifteen Premier Events, the few dozen smaller tournaments, several online tournaments, and the 2017 Evolution Championship. The 30 players who had accumulated the most points in these events automatically qualified for the tournament.

== Tournament background ==
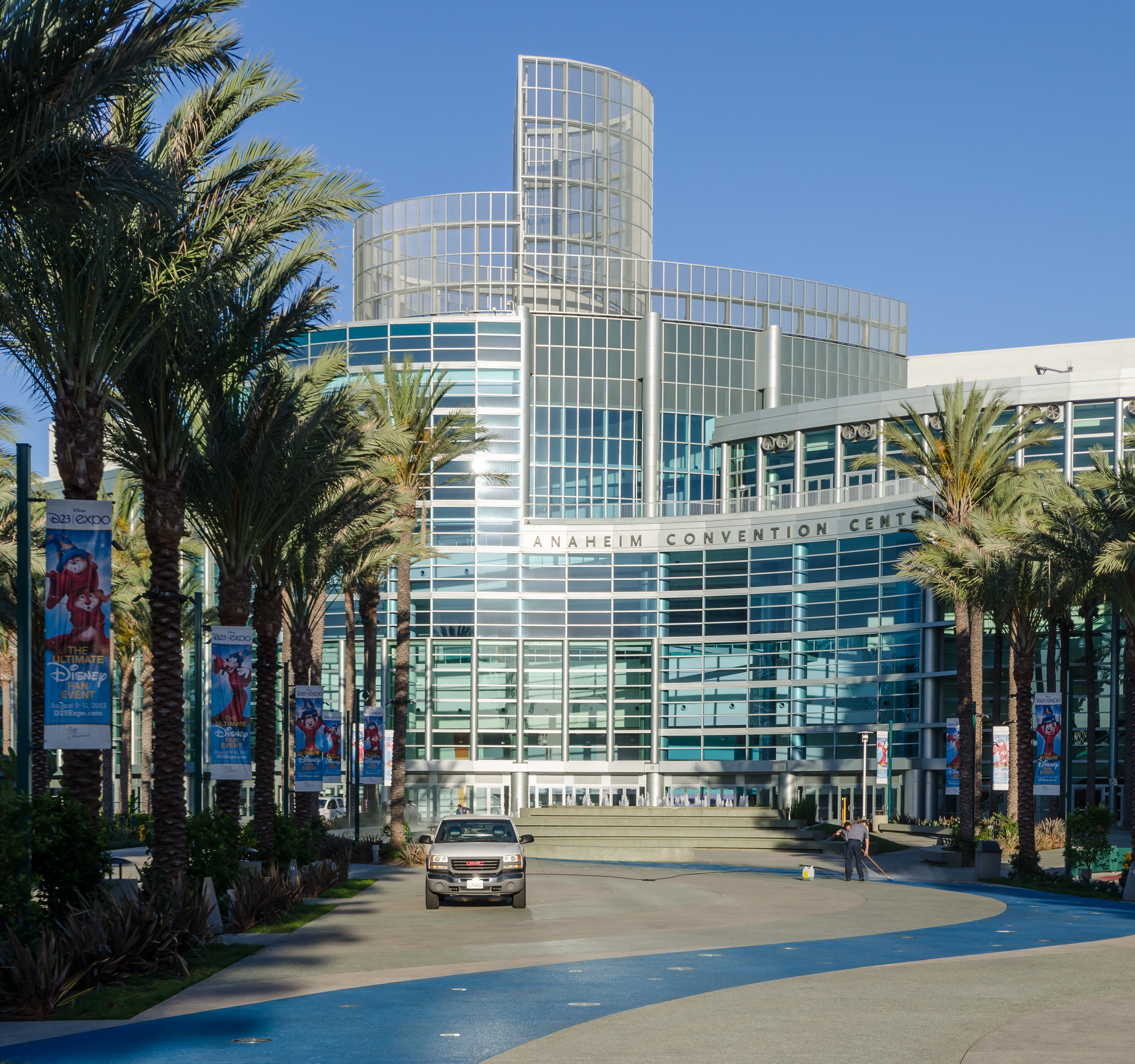
The top eight portion of the tournament took place at the Anaheim Convention Center.

The 2017 Capcom Cup took place over the course of three days, beginning with the Last Chance Qualifier played at the Anaheim Hilton on Friday, December 8. Featuring 164 players from 18 different countries, the champion of the Last Chance Qualifier automatically qualified for the bottom seed of Capcom Cup itself. The Top 32 phase of the Capcom Cup took place on Saturday, December 9. Tournament organizers decided to stick to a traditional bracket system, foregoing the group tournament system that was originally announced. The group tournament system was planned in an effort to make timing more accurate, and the Capcom Cup team stated that they were still looking into it as a possible alternative for future events.

The finals of the Capcom Cup, featuring the top 8 players of the event, took place during the PlayStation Experience in the Anaheim Convention Center.

== Participants ==
Du "NuckleDu" Dang, the winner of the 2016 Capcom Cup, announced on November 27 that he would not attend the 2017 edition of the tournament, giving up his auto-qualification to the runner-up of the 2016 tournament, Ricki Ortiz. As the seeding of the Capcom Cup is fully based on the overall leaderboard ranking, Ortiz obtained the seed number 31, ranking only above the Last Chance qualified competitor Naoki "Nemo" Nemoto.

Nemo faced top-seed Victor "Punk" Woodley in the first round of the tournament, while Ortiz faced Evo 2017 champion Hajime "Tokido" Taniguchi. The first round of the tournament also featured a match between the high-level Japanese players Kenta "Fuudo" Ai and Yusuke Momochi. Veteran Japanese player Daigo Umehara secured the 17th seed during the 2017 Pro Tour, and Brazilian Didimokof secured a place in the Capcom Cup by winning the Latin America Regional Finals. Fujimura "Yukadon" Atsushi won three Premier Events during the 2017 Capcom Pro Tour, ranking 4th in the overall standings. United Kingdom player Benjamin "ProblemX" Simon, meanwhile, won two Premier Events and two Ranking Events, ranking 6th in the overall standings.

The 18-year old Dominican competitor MenaRD qualified for the Capcom Cup despite the high cost and difficulty of traveling to the United States during the Capcom Pro Tour, coupled with the destruction caused by Hurricane Maria. Sponsored by The Rise Nation, MenaRD was ranked 25th when the tournament began. MenaRD's first round was against Ibuki-player Ho Kun Xian.

== Tournament summary ==
=== Last Chance qualifier ===
Of the 164 entrants, the winner of the Last Chance qualifier was Naoki "Nemo" Nemoto, who was already considered one of the favorites to win the event. Nemo was unable to qualify for the Capcom Cup due to a lack of free time, and had only competed in five events during the 2017 Capcom Pro Tour. Playing with the character Urien, Nemo played against Lee "Infiltration" Seon-Woo three times during the tournament. The two first faced off in the Winner's Semifinals, where Nemo defeated Infiltration's Menat 3–1. After beating Brian "Brian_F" Foster in the Winner's Finals by a 3-2 margin, Nemo faced Infiltration again in the Grand Finals. Here, Infiltration opted to switch to his old character of choice Juri. This switch paid off in the first set, as Infiltration beat Nemo 3-1 and forced a bracket reset. However, Nemo adjusted his play and scored a 3–1 victory of his own in the second set, winning the tournament. Brian_F finished third place after losing to Infiltration in the Loser's Finals.

=== Main tournament ===
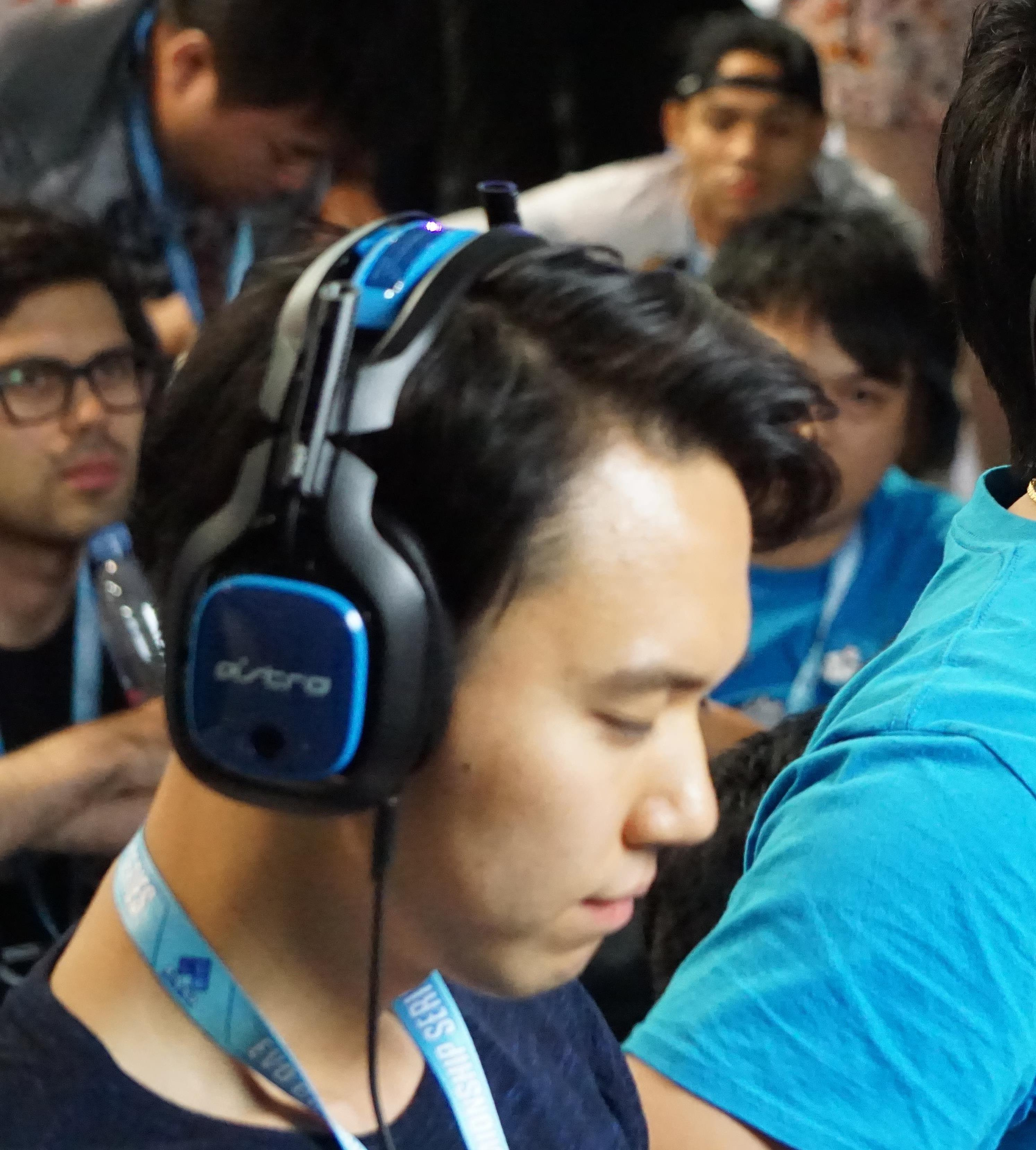
Tokido finished the 2017 Capcom Cup in second place.

Nemo knocked top-seed Punk into the loser's side during their first match of the second day, and was then knocked into the loser's side himself after losing to Daigo Umehara. Nemo went on to defeat Ryo "Dogura" Nozaki, Didimokof, and Masato "Bonchan" Takahashi in order to make it into the Top 8. Punk lost to Naoki "moke" Nakayama in the fourth round of the loser's side, missing the Top 8 by one game.

MenaRD, playing with the character Birdie, managed to remain on the winner's side for the majority of his run through the tournament, defeating high-level players such as Xian, Kazunoko, Umehara in the quarter-finals, and Itabashi Zangief in the semi-finals. MenaRD was knocked out of the winner's side in the next round by Tokido, who was playing with the character Akuma. After winning the loser's final against Nemo, MenaRD faced Tokido once again and managed to reset the bracket with a 3-2 match. Tokido controlled the fighting space using Akuma's ranged fireball attacks and tried to keep MenaRD at a distance in order to frustrate him. However, using unique quirks of Birdie that are difficult to anticipate, MenaRD could unpredictably close the distance, consistently leaping forward to execute a special attack. MenaRD won the last match of the Grand Finals 3–1.

== Impact ==
The 2017 Capcom Cup showcased entirely different player characters than seen in 2016. Characters such as Ryu, Ken, and Cammy did not appear at all in the Top 32, and characters such as Guile, R. Mika, and Laura were all knocked out early. Characters that were considered middle-tier at the start of the 2017 Capcom Pro Tour, such as M. Bison and Rashid, took the place of these formerly high-tier characters. MenaRD's mastery of Birdie was particularly notable. Shack News stated that 2017 was an "amazing year ... for Street Fighter V's character diversity." Each of the Top 8 competitors played with a unique character, resulting in a very diverse final day.

Red Bull described MenaRD's success as "a beacon of hope" for the Caribbean fighting game community. Players from this region face difficulties traveling to events, and few Premier tournaments take place in the Caribbean. MenaRD had stated that he hoped to invest his winnings ($250,000 USD) back into his local community and bring about more successful players. In a recap video produced by Capcom, MenaRD said: "kids or teenagers that want to do something in competition, you know, they usually do baseball. They usually do basketball. But I want fighting games or esports, in general, to be an option in my country."

== Reveals ==
During the final day of the Capcom Cup, Capcom announced Street Fighter 30th Anniversary Collection, a collection of Street Fighter games that predate Street Fighter IV to be released in May 2018.

Following the closing ceremony of the Capcom Cup, Street Fighter executive producer Yoshinori Ono revealed the six characters that would be incorporated into Season Three of Street Fighter V. The introduction of the character Sakura had been teased leading up to the event and did not come as a surprise. However, a second, unexpected trailer played directly after it, serving as cinematic opening for Street Fighter V: Arcade Edition. The live audience cheered in excitement sudden reveal of familiar Street Fighter characters such as Blanka, Sagat, and Cody. This trailer also revealed two new characters: G and Falke. Red Bull described Season Three's cinematic reveal as "the pinnacle of Capcom Cup 2017," calling it "the most polished and hype-inducing cinematic trailers made thus far for Street Fighter V."
