= Capcom Pro Tour 2017 regional finals =

- 2017

Tournament information
- Sport: Street Fighter V
- Location: Milan, Italy; Suntec City, Singapore; São Paulo, Brazil; Boston, Massachusetts
- Dates: October 1–November 19
- Tournament format: Double elimination
- Purse: $12,000 per tournament

The regional finals of the 2017 Capcom Pro Tour were a series of closed Street Fighter V tournaments held throughout the world. The champions of the four different regions – North America, Latin America, Europe, and Asia – automatically qualified to compete at the 2017 Capcom Cup. People qualified to compete in their regional finals by scoring highly on their regional leaderboard or winning ranking events during the 2017 Capcom Pro Tour. The four tournaments all took place between October 1 and November 19, 2017.

== Background ==
from April to September 2017, Capcom held a Ranking Event season with tournaments all over the world. Players of each of the four regions – Europe, Latin America, North America, and Asia – could compete in these tournaments in order to gain points towards their regional leaderboard standing. The top 7 players of each leaderboard qualified for their respective regional final. The winner of each regional final automatically qualified for the 2017 Capcom Cup and were awarded 400 points on the global leaderboards. Unlike the 2016 Capcom Pro Tour regional competition, the regional events were region-locked so only residents of that region are allowed to compete. While describing the details of the 2017 Capcom pro Tour, Capcom stated that they "felt we could do more to truly highlight the talent from each region. The events ended up effectively being last chance qualifiers for all regions, and that is something we want to avoid this year. With points being awarded to players only from that region and the last chance qualifier being region locked, we will be able to truly see who the best player from each region is."

Each of the four regional finals was a two-day event with a "Last Chance Qualifier" on day 1 and an 8-player tournament on day 2. Each regional final had a purse of $30,000 USD, which was distributed among the top 8. The grand prize of each regional final, besides qualifying for the Capcom Cup, was US$12,000.

== Tournaments ==
Four regional finals took place throughout the world between October 1 and November 19, 2017. These events were held (chronologically) in Europe, Asia, Latin America, and North America.

=== Europe ===
The European regional finals of the 2016 Capcom Cup were the first of the four events, held during the Milan Games Week in Milan, Italy on October 1. The tournament was won by Benjamin "Problem X" Simon, scoring a 3–2 win over Olivier "Luffy" Hay and defeating Arman "Phenom" Hanjani 3–1 in the grand finals. Problem X' triumph at the European regional finals constituted his fifth victory in the 2017 Capcom Pro Tour, and the top three all qualified for the Capcom Cup.

=== Asia ===
The Asian regional finals were held at the Southeast Asia Major at GameStart 2017 in Suntec City, Singapore, on October 14–15. The tournament was held side by side with the Tekken World Tour Asia Pacific Regional Championships and the Windjammers Asia Championships. The tournament was won by Tokido, playing using the character Akuma, defeating Li-Wei "Oil King" Lin in the grand finals.

=== Latin America ===
The Latin American regional finals were held on Saturday, November 4 in São Paulo. Brazilian laws prevented Capcom from offering any prize money at the event. The tournament was won by Brazilian Dhalsim player Renato "DidimoKOF" Pereira Martins. While DidimoKOF only finished ninth on the Latin American leaderboards, he was added to top 8 bracket (along with eighth-ranked Moisés "Moise" Berrios) when the region's two top-seed players both withdrew. Saul "MenaRD" Mena and Thomas "Brolynho" Proença had already secured a Capcom Cup placing and had little to gain by competing in a tournament with no prize pot. DidimoKOF won against Dominican player Cristhoper "Caba" Rodriguez in the opening round and went on to defeat Moise and Bruno "DoomSnake507" La Grotta before facing Caba again in the grand finals. Here, DidimoKOF defeated Caba's Guile by a 3-2 margin and won his first major tournament.

=== North America ===
The North American finals were hosted by Red Bull GmbH and held on November 18–19 at The Castle at Park Plaza in Boston, Massachusetts. The event, again titled "Red Bull Battlegrounds", was announced during a Capcom panel on the first day of Evo 2017. The Last Chance qualifier took the form of a 512-player open bracket tournament, featuring champions from regional events as well as the top amateur players from the online Red Bull Proving Grounds tournament. The Last Chance qualifier was won by Marcus "The Cool Kid93" Redmond, playing with the character Abigail. The Cool Kid93 was defeated by Victor "Punk" Woodley in the winner's quarterfinals and knocked out by Gustavo "801 Strider" Romero in the loser's bracket. Punk went on to win the tournament, defeating rising star Derek "iDom" Ruffin in the grand finals. Playing with the character Karin, Punk bested iDom's Laura three times, without taking a single loss.

Capcom teased the inclusion of the character Sakura in Street Fighter V by releasing cherry blossom-like confetti during the closing ceremony of Red Bull Battlegrounds.
