= Punk (gamer) =

American professional esports player

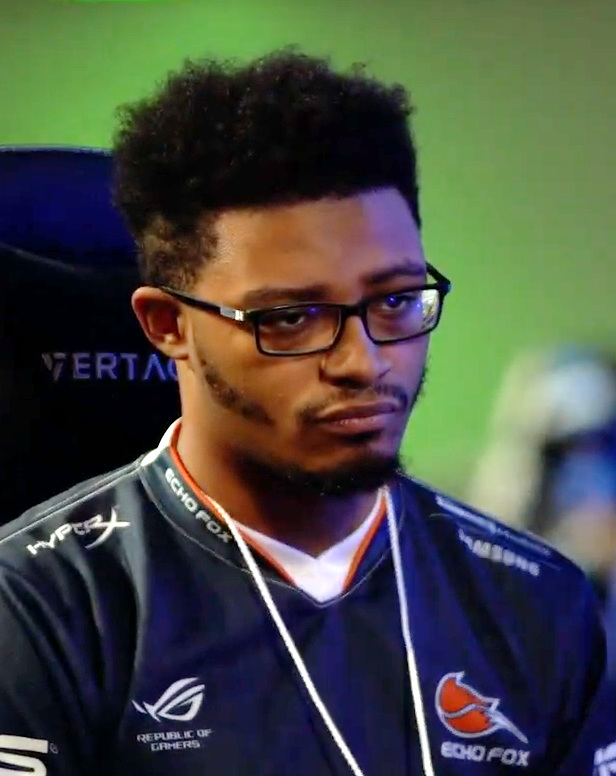
- Woodley in 2018

Personal information
- Name: Victor Woodley
- Nationality: American

Current team
- Team: FlyQuest
- Game: Street Fighter 6

Career information
- Playing career: 2009–present

Team history
- 2017–2018: Panda Global
- 2018: Echo Fox
- 2018–2019: Team Reciprocity
- 2020–2022: Panda Global
- 2023–present: FlyQuest

Career highlights and awards
- Evo champion (2024); ELEAGUE champion (2017)

Victor Woodley, better known under the name Punk, is an American Street Fighter player.

== Career ==
=== Rise to success and Eleague 2017 ===
Punk began playing Street Fighter professionally after the release of Street Fighter IV in 2009. Though he occasionally visited local events, Punk primarily played Street Fighter online while focusing on his education. When Street Fighter V was released in 2016, Punk had completed high school and began attending tournaments more frequently. Punk first appeared on the professional scene when he qualified for the 2016 Red Bull Battlegrounds (the North American Capcom Pro Tour regional finals) through netplay. Here, Punk defeated various high-level players such as Filipino Champ|Ryan "Filipino Champ" Ramirez, Chris Tatarian, and Justin Wong, and settled on third place after losing to Tokido and NuckleDu. In the months after, Punk took home first place three tournaments in a row: Northeast Championships, Winter Brawl, and The King of New York. At the Austin, Texas tournament Fighters Underground in March 2017, Punk defeated players such as NuckleDu, Yusuke Momochi, and Arman "Phenom" Hanjani in the group stage, but was defeated by Justin Wong and Filipino Champ and ended up tied for seventh place.

On March 8, 2017, Panda Global announced that the company had signed Punk, with CEO Alan Bunney predicting that Punk would be "one of the dark horses of 2017." This contract came ahead of South by Southwest (SXSW) 2017 and the ELeague Street Fighter V Invitational that ran from March 27 to May 26. At SXSW Conference's Fighters Underground, Punk beat NuckleDu, Yusuke Momochi, Filipino Champ, and K-Brad in the group stages, but quickly bottomed out on day 2 because he felt unusually nervous. At the Eleague opening event on March 27, Punk was able to defeat all opponents except for Evo 2016-champion Lee "Infiltration" Seon-woo.

During Eleague and the early 2017 Capcom Pro Tour, Punk's dominating play-style with the character Karin and his trash-talk during interviews became frequently discussed. After winning West Coast Warzone 6, Punk stated that he wanted "to do well at tournaments so people can't talk [shit] about me. I like when people boo me. It motivates me to keep winning. I don't even have to respond back." Punk noted that people would get frustrated while playing against him. When Punk competed in California again during the 2017 NorCal Regionals, he was routinely teabagging his opponents Long "Circa LPN" Nguyen and NuckleDu in an effort to taunt them. After winning the tournament, Punk told Kotaku that he uses teabagging to undermine and distract his opponents, stating that the taunt "gets in certain people's heads and messes them up." Though this behavior was answered by laughs and cheers from the crowd, Punk's teabagging proved controversial throughout the fighting game community.

Punk went on to win the 2017 Eleague Street Fighter V Invitation, defeating Arman "Phenom" Hanjani in the finals. Phenom kicked Punk into the loser's bracket during their first match-up in the tournament, but when Punk faced Phenom's character Necalli again in the grand final, he won the match 4–2, taking home $150,000 USD in prize earnings.

=== Second half of the 2017 Capcom Cup ===
Punk placed second at Evo 2017, losing to Street Fighter veteran Hajime "Tokido" Taniguchi. After defeating Itabashi Zangief and Kazunoko, Punk faced Tokido's Akuma in the winner's finals, but eventually lost against him 6–1. After accepting his second-place medal, Punk buried his face in his hands. Later that night, Punk sent out the Twitter message: "Let everyone down I'm so disappointed in myself."

Punk competed once more at the Red Bull Battlegrounds, which served again as the Capcom Pro Tour North American regional final. This time, Punk was a high ranking player, and he went up against a new player – Derek "iDom" Ruffin – in the finals. Punk defeated iDom 3–2, taking the title and the US$12,000 first-place prize. In a post-match interview, Punk stated that "[Winning this tournament] actually means a lot," as he originally entered the scene through Red Bull Battlegrounds one year prior.

After having won a large number of tournaments in the 2017 Capcom Pro Tour, Punk entered the Capcom Cup as the top seed. However, Punk tied for ninth place after losing to Last Chance-qualifier Naoki "Nemo" Nemoto and fellow newcomer Naoki "Moke" Nakayama.

== Background ==
Woodley was only 18 years old when he became a professional Street Fighter player in 2016, much younger than most of his competitors. In an interview with Red Bull in April 2017, he stated: "I actually like having a target on my back. It's good that everyone wants to beat me. I like the feeling of people being scared or nervous when they see me in their pool. I really like that." Punk chose his screen name in honor of pro wrestler Phillip Jack Brooks, who goes by the ring name "CM Punk".
