= MenaRD =

Dominican esports player (born 1999)

Personal information
- Name: Saul Leonardo Mena II
- Born: 28 August 1999 (age 27); Santo Domingo, Dominican Republic
- Nationality: Dominican

Current team
- Team: Red Bull eSports; Weibo Gaming
- Game(s): Street Fighter series Guilty Gear Strive; Injustice 2

Career information
- Playing career: 2015–present

Team history
- 2016–2017: REFORCE eSports
- 2017: Magitek Esports
- 2017–2019: Rise Nation
- 2019–2024: Bandits Gaming
- 2024–2025: Team Falcons
- 2024–present: Red Bull eSports
- 2025–present: Weibo Gaming

Career highlights and awards
- 4× EVO champion (2024 Japan, 2025 x2, 2026); 2× Capcom Cup champion (2017, 2023)
Medal record
Esports
Representing Dominican Republic
Central American and Caribbean Games
Gold medal – first place	2026 Santo Domingo	Street Fighter 6

Saul Leonardo Mena II (born 28 August 1999), known by the pseudonym MenaRD, is a Dominican professional fighting game player. MenaRD mainly specializes in Street Fighter and has also competed in Injustice 2 and Guilty Gear Strive. He won the EVO championship four times, the Red Bull Kumite 2024 and the Capcom Cup in 2017 and 2023. He also represented the Dominican Republic national team at the 2026 Central American and Caribbean Games, earning a gold medal.

== Professional career ==
=== 2017 ===
MenaRD began to gain prominence during the Capcom Pro Tour 2017. He won his first 2017 CPT event at Game Over Tournament 2017. He also competed in the Latin American region finals and the SoCal Regionals 2017, finishing in fourth place in the latter.

MenaRD was able to qualify for the Capcom Cup despite the high cost and difficulty of traveling to the United States during the Capcom Pro Tour, coupled with the destruction caused by Hurricane Maria. Sponsored by The Rise Nation, he was ranked 25th when the tournament began. MenaRD's first round was against Ibuki-player Ho Kun Xian.

Playing with the character Birdie, MenaRD managed to remain on the winner's side for the majority of his run through the tournament, defeating high-level players such as Xian, Kazunoko, Umehara in the quarter-finals, and Itabashi Zangief in the semi-finals. MenaRD was knocked out of the winner's side in the next round by Tokido, who was playing with the character Akuma. After winning the loser's final against Nemo, MenaRD faced Tokido once again and managed to reset the bracket with a 3-2 match. Tokido controlled the fighting space using Akuma's ranged fireball attacks and tried to keep MenaRD at a distance in order to frustrate him. However, using unique quirks of Birdie that are difficult to anticipate, MenaRD could unpredictably close the distance, consistently leaping forward to execute a special attack. MenaRD won the last match of the Grand Finals 3–1.

=== 2023 ===
In February 2023, MenaRD won Capcom Cup IX, becoming the first gamer to win the Capcom Cup twice. In August, he competed in Evo 2023, where he lost to the Street Fighter 6 tournament to Angrybird.

=== 2024 ===
In March 2024, MenaRD won the Red Bull Kumite. The following month, he won the SF6 tournament at Evo Japan 2024. He also competed in Evo 2024 and the 2024 Esports World Cup, where he was eliminated in the first phase in the latter. On 24 August 2024, he won Cream City Convergence 2024.

=== 2025 ===
In May 2025, MenaRD won the SF6 tournament in Evo Japan 2025. Three months later, he competed at Evo 2025, where he defeated Kakeru in the final. Additionally, he was nominated for the Best Esports Athlete at The Games Awards 2025, but did not win.

=== 2026 ===
At Evo 2026, MenaRD won the Street Fighter 6 tournament, becoming the first player to win back-to-back Street Fighter 6 championships at Evo.

== National team career ==
In August 2026, MenaRD competed for his country at the Street Fighter 6 tournament of the 2026 Central American and Caribbean Games, where he won the gold medal.
