= Evo 2017 =

Fighting game event in Las Vegas, Nevada

2017 Evolution Championship Series

Tournament information
- Location: Las Vegas, Nevada, United States
- Dates: July 14–16, 2017
- Tournament format: Double elimination
- Venue: Mandalay Bay

Final positions
- Champions: SFV: Hajime "Tokido" Taniguchi; SSB4: Saleem "Salem" Young; T7: Hyun-jin "JDCR" Kim; BBCF: Ryusei Ito; UMvC3: Rene "RyanLV" Romero; SSBM: Adam "Armada" Lindgren; IJ2: Ryan "Dragon" Walker; GGXrdR2: Omito Hashimoto; KOFXIV: Jiahong "E.T." Lin

Tournament statistics
- Attendance: ~10,000

The 2017 Evolution Championship Series (commonly referred to as Evo 2017) was a fighting game event held in Las Vegas on July 14–16 that was part of the long-running Evolution Championship Series. The event offered tournaments for various fighting games, such as Street Fighter V, Tekken 7, and Injustice 2. Over 10,000 people registered for the event with Tekken 7 receiving double the number of players from the previous year.

== Venue ==
Contrast to the previous year's event which took place in two venues, Evo 2017 took place in the Mandalay Bay resort for all three days of the event. The first two days of the event were held in the Mandalay Bay Convention Center, while the final day was held in the Mandalay Bay Events Center like it had in 2016.

== Games ==
The nine games played at Evo 2017 were announced in January 2017 during a special announcement stream on Twitch, with event co-founder Joey Cuellar discussing the inclusion of each game. The games set to be contested consisted of new releases, FGC contemporaries, and updated releases. New additions included BlazBlue: Central Fiction, The King of Fighters XIV, and Injustice 2 while Guilty Gear Xrd REV 2 would replace Guilty Gear Xrd -REVELATOR-. A major change among the Smash community was that Super Smash Bros. Melee's finals would be moved to the prime time spot on Saturday, contrast to its Sunday spot in the previous years. A ninth game, a Player's Choice title, was later won by Ultimate Marvel vs. Capcom 3, after having donated the most money for Make-A-Wish International via Generosity.com. The other three games were Street Fighter V, Super Smash Bros. for Wii U, and Tekken 7.

In an interview with PVP Live's Amanda Stevens, veteran Super Street Fighter II Turbo player and commentator, James Chen had mixed opinions regarding the lineup praising Guilty Gear and BlazBlue's simultaneous inclusion while criticizing the Player's Choice game. Although Pokkén Tournament lost the Make-A-Wish Foundation poll, in recognition of the Pokkén scenes passion for their game as shown by being the second most funded fighting game; Joey Cuellar offered $10,000 for pot bonuses towards various tournaments surrounding the game.

=== Side events ===
As with the previous two years, the AnimEVO series of side tournaments, which is dedicated to airdasher fighting games was at the event with more than sixteen fighting games that were competed in including Catherine, Gundam Versus, Puyo Puyo Tetris, Guilty Gear XX Accent Core Plus R and Under Night In-Birth EXE: Late as well as former EVO titles Persona 4 Arena Ultimax and Pokkén Tournament. The side tournament is notable for the large amount of support it received from Bandai Namco, Sega, and other developers. Voice actress Kana Ueda was also in attendance and placed 5th in the Gundam Versus tournament. Other side events for games like Super Street Fighter II Turbo, Project M, Dissidia Final Fantasy NT and the upcoming Dragon Ball FighterZ also occurred during the event.

== Participants ==
The Evolution Championship Series has historically been the largest fighting game tournament in the world, allowing free registration for anyone who wants to compete. Registration for the event closed on July 1, which Joey "Mr. Wizard" Cuellar had announced the final registration numbers. The three largest games from last year: Street Fighter V, Super Smash Bros. for Wii U, and Super Smash Bros. Melee have all seen decreases in numbers with the games going from 5107 to 2622, 2662 to 1515, and 2372 to 1435 respectively. In contrast, Tekken 7 doubled in entrant numbers receiving over 1,200 entrants which was commonly associated with the release of the title's console version.

Evo 2017 has received over 10,000 attendees in competition.

== Broadcasting ==
It was announced that ESPN2 would once again broadcast the finals of the Street Fighter V tournament on July 16 with Kevin Lopes stating "This final will provide no shortage of compelling competition, and we look forward to delivering this event to fans.". The Super Smash Bros. for Wii U finals in addition to the aforementioned Street Fighter V finals were also broadcast on Disney XD, as part of the launch of the network's new video game-focused D|XP block.

As every year, the entire tournament was streamed through the Twitch streaming service. The tournament was broadcast across nine different streams: six Evo-run streams provided coverage of all games throughout the weekend, while Capcom ran its own stream that features additional coverage of Street Fighter V on Friday and Saturday, Namco provided a stream with additional coverage of Tekken 7 on Friday, while NetherRealm Studios provided a stream with additional coverage of Injustice 2.

During the Street Fighter V finals, ESPN2 pulled the match between Ryota "Kazunoko" Inoue and Du "NuckleDu" Dang and forced the former to change his costume for Cammy as the company felt that the character's default costume was "too sexy" for broadcasting.

== Reveals ==
A day before Evo 2017 began, SNK announced PlayStation 4 and PlayStation Vita ports of Samurai Shodown V Special, with a beta build being playable during the event at the SNK booth.

On the first day of the event, Capcom revealed three nostalgic costumes (one for Alex, Ibuki, and Juri Han) and Ryu's classic Street Fighter II stage, Suzaku Castle, for Street Fighter V. They also announced a new stage called Ring of Pride as well as a new costume for Guile designed by Capcom Cup 2016 champion, Du "NuckleDu" Dang.

Shortly after the Ultimate Marvel vs. Capcom 3 finals, Capcom's Peter "Combofiend" Rosas revealed Jedah for Marvel vs. Capcom: Infinite during a match against Street Fighter V finalist, Ryan "Filipino Champ" Ramirez. Following the BlazBlue: Central Fiction finals, Toshimichi Mori of Arc System Works went on the Mandalay Bay stage to reveal Jubei as a DLC character for BlazBlue: Central Fiction. Additionally, Mori announced BlazBlue: Cross Tag Battle, a crossover fighter featuring characters from BlazBlue, Persona 4 Arena, Under Night In-Birth, and RWBY. Another trailer prior to the Tekken 7 finals showcased Arika's upcoming fighting game, also revealing Street Fighter EX characters Skullomania and Darun Mister would be joining the roster. Between the Tekken 7 finals and Super Smash Bros. for Wii U finals, Bandai Namco Entertainment showed the first gameplay footage of Trunks in the upcoming Dragon Ball FighterZ, as well as announcing a nine character beta for later in the year; this was instantly followed by Katsuhiro Harada and Michael Murray revealing Geese Howard as a DLC guest character for Tekken 7. Before the Street Fighter V finals began, Yoshinori Ono went on-stage to announce Abigail from Final Fight as the next DLC character in Street Fighter V's second season.

Prior to the Street Fighter V finals, the EVO tournament organizers announced the EVO Japan 2018 dates as January 26–28.

== Tournament summary ==
=== Street Fighter V ===
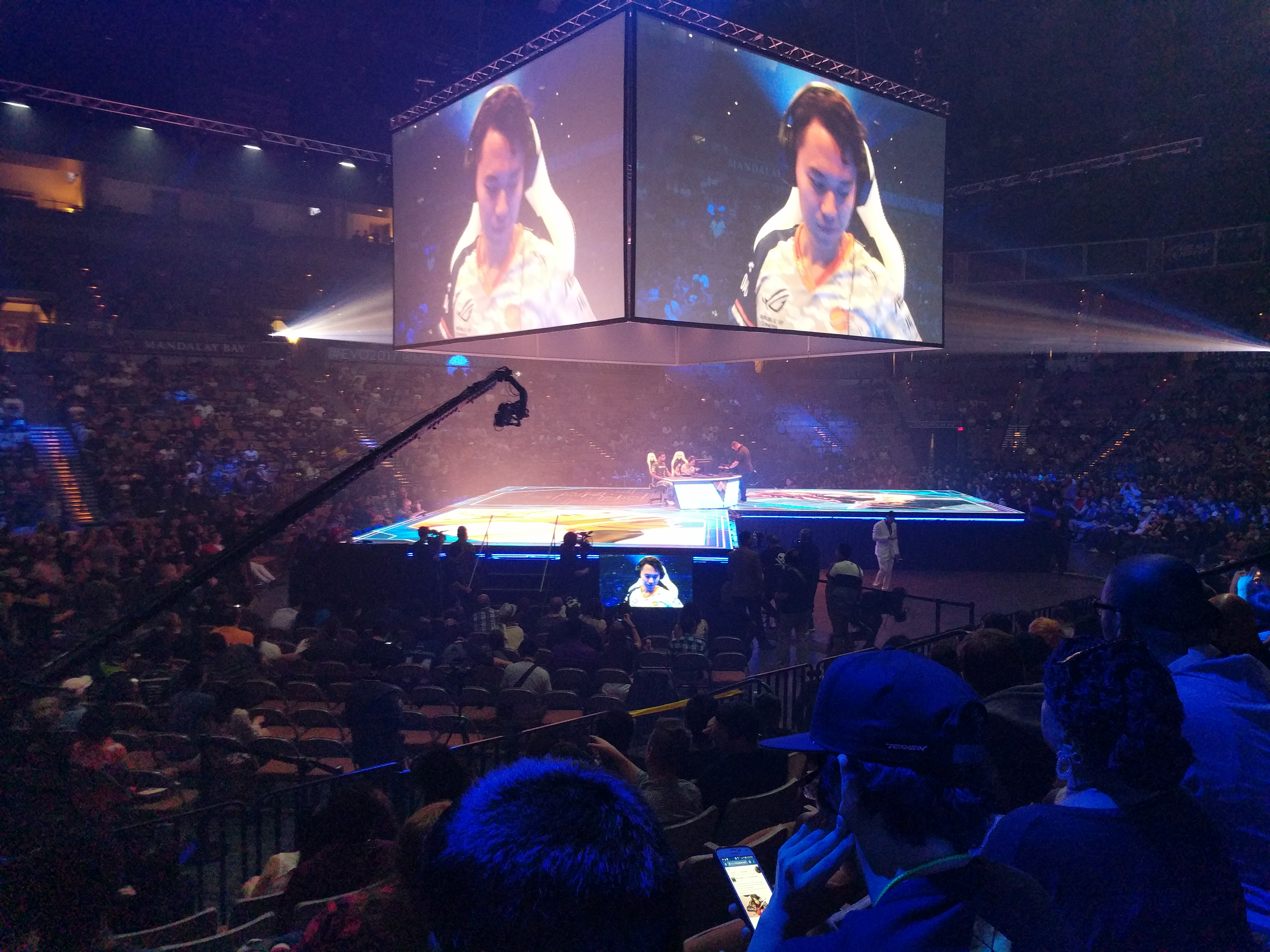
The Mandalay Bay Events Center shortly before the Street Fighter V grand finals, with Tokido featured on the video board.

Evo 2017 was the second year that Street Fighter V was featured on the big stage with the event once again being the closing game. Ryota "Kazunoko" Inoue would notably place 3rd in the tournament, making his appearance in the Street Fighter V finals his second Top 8 finish during the event. Hiromiki "Itabashi Zangief" Kumada would place 4th in the event; both Kazunoko and Itabashi Zangief were sent to the Loser's Bracket by the event's eventual runner-up Victor "Punk" Woodley. The finals had a diverse number of characters including Karin, Nash, Cammy, Zangief, and Akuma.

The Grand Finals was a showdown between Japan's Hajime "Tokido" Taniguchi and the United States's Victor "Punk" Woodley. Tokido took the first two games with the first match notably having Tokido using Akuma's taunt to defeat Punk's Karin. Tokido's relentless pressure, okizeme, and fireball game would lead to him resetting the bracket 3-1 and then follow it up with a clean 3–0 upset over Punk in order to become the Evo 2017 Street Fighter V champion. Tokido received $35,000 for winning the finals and at the time moved up to second place in the Capcom Pro Tour 2017 standings. This victory would also give Tokido his third EVO trophy, with his first two being for Capcom vs. SNK 2 (2002) and Super Street Fighter II Turbo (2007).

PC Gamer described the grand finals between Tokido and Punk as a match between a veteran and a newcomer as the players at the time of the event were 32 and 18 respectively. One of the Twitch commentators at the end of the finals, James Chen, notably bursted in tears and gave a message saying "Evo is love. L-O-V-E. When you hold that L and run it back: EVO.”; the message is a response to all of the passion and support that the fighting game community has done towards the events and fighting games.

=== Super Smash Bros. for Wii U ===
Taking the spot of Melee on Sunday, Wii U nevertheless saw a drop in attendance from 2016, but still had the second highest attendance of any game at Evo 2017 with the exception of Street Fighter V. Wii U featured many notable upsets; the game's 2016 winner Elliot "Ally" Carroza-Oyarce and runner-up Takuto "Kameme" Ono were both eliminated before the semi-final round. Ultimately, despite seven of the final thirty-two players using the controversial top tier Bayonetta, only one secured a place in the finals, and each of the top eight players mained a different character. Evo 2015 champion Gonzalo "ZeRo" Barrios of Chile defeated veteran player Larry "Larry Lurr" Holland in winners' finals 3-2 after being down 2–0. Saleem "Salem" Young, after being sent to the losers' bracket by Larry Lurr, defeated Kengo "KEN" Suzuki in losers' quarters, Gavin "Tweek" Dempsey in losers' semifinals, and won a rematch with Larry Lurr 3–1 in losers' finals. Salem would then go on to win the tournament, resetting the bracket against ZeRo 3-2 and then winning 3–2 in the second set of grand finals.

=== Tekken 7 ===
The third year at the Evolution Championship Series and its first since its console release, Tekken 7 had over 1,200 entrants competing for a qualification to the Tekken World Tour finals. South Korea was the most dominant region represented in the finals with half of the Top 8 being Korean players. Sang-hyeon "JEOnnding" Jeon was the lowest finishing of the four in 5th place, with the top three being established EVO champions; Jae-min "Knee" Bae, Jin-woo "Saint" Choi, and Hyun-jin "JDCR" Kim placing 3rd, 2nd, and 1st respectively. JDCR's victory in an Echo Fox team kill Grand Finals lead to him receiving his second EVO championship, his previous title was in 2014 for Tekken Tag Tournament 2.

=== BlazBlue: Central Fiction ===
Although BlazBlue: Central Fiction didn't have more entrants than its sibling, Guilty Gear Xrd REV 2, the finals did not disappoint. The title is considered to be among the most popular fighting games in Japan, in which all of the Top 8 finalists hailed from. In the grand finals, it came down to Shoji “Fenrich” Sho and Ryusei Ito using Jin and Carl respectively. Both have played each other frequently in tournaments and are well acquainted friends. Fenrich was able to reset the bracket, sending Ryusei Ito to the loser's bracket; however in the final game of the event, Ryusei came out as the victor 3–2.

=== Ultimate Marvel vs. Capcom 3 ===
The finals of Ultimate Marvel vs. Capcom 3 at Evo 2017 was considered by many as the game's swan song. The defending champion, Christopher "NYChrisG" Gonzalez would fall second place to fellow Morrigan player, Rene "RyanLV" Romero. RyanLV benefited in the grand finals with his unique synergy of Chun-Li, Morrigan, and Phoenix; a style which emphasized very heavily on offensive play, in contrast to NYChrisG's defensive play. The third-place finisher, Canada's Jose "Quackbot" Aldape (who entered as PC Marvel God), was a surprise by many as he upset many fan favorites along the way including Ichihara Takumi, Kenneth "K-Brad" Bradley, Vineeth "ApologyMan" Meka, Justin Wong, Raynel "RayRay" Hidalgo among others.

=== Super Smash Bros. Melee ===
Although the finals took place on Saturday, the Super Smash Bros. Melee event had as much excitement as the previous years. One notable upset was where fan favorite, William "Leffen" Hjelte was notably eliminated by Ryan "The Moon" Coker-Welch in a match to advance in Top 8 in Loser's Bracket. Adam "Armada" Lindgren would face off against Joseph "Mango" Marquez in the Winner's Finals with Armada sending Mango to Loser's Finals, 3–0. Mango then eliminated the defending champion, Juan "Hungrybox" Debiedma over the course of five close games. In Grand Finals, Armada won the first set 3-1 and took the title of EVO champion for the second time.

=== Injustice 2 ===
In its debut year at the Evolution Championship Series, Injustice 2 had one of the most unexpected victories at the event. While Echo Fox's Dominique "SonicFox" McLean was the favorite to win the event, he fell victim to Tim "HoneyBee" Commandeur's Flash in Winner's and Andrew "Semiij" Fontanez' Catwoman and netted himself a fifth-place finish. The grand finals would see HoneyBee face off against Ryan "Dragon" Walker in a runback from Winner's Finals. Dragon would come out on top with his Aquaman secondary 3–2 against HoneyBee's Flash. The event saw plenty of character diversity with characters such as Atrocitus, Catwoman, Poison Ivy, Batman, Black Adam, Brainiac and the aforementioned Flash and Aquaman receiving exposure. Many of the mistakes in the finals made were attributed to the title's status as a recently released title as Injustice 2 was released two months prior to the event itself.

=== The King of Fighters XIV ===
As with the previous years that the King of Fighters franchise was represented, which was with the thirteenth installment; the Evo 2017 King of Fighters XIV tournament had global talent represented in its Top 8 with six countries represented. The finals saw some upsets as the Evo 2013 champion and KOF XIV World Champion, Reynald Tacsuan and Murakami "M'" Masanobu respectively, were notably eliminated by Chia-Chen "ZJZ" Tseng and Ruber "Pako" Partida respectively. Ultimately, Taiwanese player and Evo 2014 3rd placer Chia-Hung Lin "E.T." Lin would become the champion after defeating the Evo 2014 champion, Zhuojun "Xiao Hai" Zeng of China with a 3-2 finish, having earned 60% of the $14,000 pot bonus. His victory was attributed to a surprise character pick in which Goro Daimon was used.

== Prize pool ==
The Street Fighter V event has received a $50,000 pot bonus as part of the 2017 Capcom Pro Tour Season. The King of Fighters XIV received a $14,000 bonus pot courtesy of SNK and Atlus. Injustice 2 received a pot bonus of $50,000 as part of the Injustice 2 Pro Series by ESL Gaming. Arc System Works and Aksys Games provided a $10,000 pot bonus each for Guilty Gear Xrd REV 2 and BlazBlue: Central Fiction. Bandai Namco Entertainment also provided a $15,000 pot bonus towards the Tekken 7 finals as part of the 2017 Tekken World Tour Season.

Due to being the most donated fighting game for the Make-A-Wish Foundation crowdfunding, Ultimate Marvel vs. Capcom 3 received a $10,000 pot bonus.

== Controversies ==
In a Super Smash Bros. Melee match between Juan "Hungrybox" Debiedma and Zac "SFAT" Cordoni in Winner's Quarter-Finals, both players were issued a yellow card after Debiedma called his coach, Luis “Captain Crunch” Rosias over for advice; Gordon "G$" Connell mocked Debiedma by miming a coaching session with Cordoni. As both players violated the "No Coaching After Pools" rule, lead EVO tournament organizer Joey "Mr. Wizard" Cuellar let the match stand. Had Connell not teased Debiedma with the coaching session, Debiedma would have most likely been disqualified. This upset many fans, as they believed that Cordoni was not being coached and didn't deserve to get carded. Furthermore, the official EVO ruleset stated that, if the incident was not reported at the time it took place, then the incident will be ignored, meaning that both Debiedma and Cordoni shouldn't have been carded in the first place, since the incident was not reported.

== Results ==
Street Fighter V
Place	Player	Alias	Character(s)
1st	(Japan) Hajime Taniguchi	FOX|Tokido	Akuma
2nd	(United States) Victor Woodley	PG|Punk	Karin, Nash
3rd	(Japan) Ryota Inoue	GGP|Kazunoko	Cammy
4th	(Japan) Hiromiki Kumada	DNG|Itabashi Zangief	Zangief
5th	(Japan) Naoki Nakayama	Moke	Rashid
5th	(United States) Du Dang	Liquid|NuckleDu	Guile, R. Mika
7th	(Japan) Joe Egami	GRPT|MOV	Chun-Li
7th	(United States) Ryan Ramirez	SPY|Filipino Champ	Dhalsim

Super Smash Bros. for Wii U
Place	Player	Alias	Character(s)
1st	(United States) Saleem Young	MVG|Salem	Bayonetta
2nd	(Chile) Gonzalo Barrios	TSM|ZeRo	Diddy Kong
3rd	(United States) Larry Holland	MSF|Larry Lurr	Fox
4th	(United States) Gavin Dempsey	P1|Tweek	Cloud, Donkey Kong
5th	(United States) Nairoby Quezada	NRG|Nairo	Zero Suit Samus, Bowser
5th	(Japan) Kengo Suzuki	KEN	Sonic
7th	(United States) James Makekau-Tyson	CLG|VoiD	Sheik
7th	(United States) Samuel Buzby	RNG|Dabuz	Rosalina & Luma

Tekken 7
Place	Player	Alias	Character(s)
1st	(South Korea) Hyun-jin Kim	FOX|JDCR	Heihachi, Dragunov
2nd	(South Korea) Jin-woo Choi	FOX|Saint	Jack-7
3rd	(South Korea) Jae-min Bae	Knee	Bryan, Feng, Dragunov, Steve, Devil Jin
4th	(Japan) Miyabe Taisei	Taisei	Steve
5th	(United States) Hoa Luu	Streamme|Anakin	Jack-7
5th	(South Korea) Sang-hyeon Jeon	JEOndding	Lucky Chloe, Eddy
7th	(Japan) Aoki Takehiko	Yamasa|Take	Kazumi, Bryan
7th	(United States) Michael Khieu	Suiken	Eliza

BlazBlue: Central Fiction
Place	Player	Alias	Character(s)
1st	(Japan) Ryusei Ito	Ryusei	Carl
2nd	(Japan) Shoji Sho	Fenrich	Jin
3rd	(Japan) Fumihiko Yokobori	Fumi	Nine
4th	(Japan) Tatsuro Fujiyoshi	iGS|Kaibutsukun	Izanami, Nine
5th	(Japan) Yuji Sasaki	TokyoVe|Souji	Arakune
5th	(Japan) Satoshi Kawai	Tochigin	Azrael
7th	(Japan) Ryuji Utsumi	DoraBang	Bang, Mu-12
7th	(Japan) Takao Nao	Mt. Takao	Rachel

Ultimate Marvel vs. Capcom 3
Place	Player	Alias	Character(s)
1st	(United States) Rene Romero	SPY|RyanLV	Chun-Li/Morrigan/Phoenix
2nd	(United States) Christopher Gonzalez	EG|NYChrisG	Morrigan/Doctor Doom/Vergil
3rd	(Canada) Jose Aldape	PC Marvel God (Quackbot)	Magneto/Doctor Doom/Phoenix
4th	(United States) Luis Cervantes	Paradigm	Haggar/Dormammu/Doctor Doom, Arthur/Rocket Raccoon/Haggar, Haggar/Rocket Raccoon/Doctor Doom
5th	(United States) Joey D'alessandro	JoeyD	Zero/Doctor Doom/Vergil
5th	(United States) Hasson Stimphil	KPB|Prodigy	Magneto/Doctor Doom/Phoenix
7th	(United States) Eddie Mu	GB|NotEnoughDamage	Zero/Doctor Doom/Vergil
7th	(United States) David Santiago	NoLife	Zero/Dante/Vergil

Super Smash Bros. Melee
Place	Player	Alias	Character(s)
1st	(Sweden) Adam Lindgren	[A]|Armada	Peach
2nd	(United States) Joseph Marquez	C9|Mango	Fox, Falco
3rd	(United States) Juan Debiedma	Liquid|Hungrybox	Jigglypuff
4th	(United States) Jason Zimmerman	FOX.MVG|Mew2King	Marth, Fox, Sheik, Peach
5th	(United States) Joey Aldama	Lucky	Fox
5th	(United States) Justin McGrath	PG|Plup	Sheik, Fox
7th	(United States) Ryan Coker-Welch	MSF|The Moon	Marth
7th	(United States) Zac Cordoni	CLG|SFAT	Fox

Injustice 2
Place	Player	Alias	Character(s)
1st	(United States) Ryan Walker	Noble|Dragon	Aquaman, Poison Ivy
2nd	(Canada) Tim Commandeur	cR|HoneyBee	Flash, Aquaman
3rd	(United States) Jivan Karapetian	FOX|Theo	Superman
4th	(United States) Andrew Fontanez	Noble|Semiij	Catwoman
5th	(United States) Dominique McLean	FOX|SonicFox	Red Hood, Black Adam
5th	(Canada) Alexandre Dubé-Bilodeau	PG|Hayatei	Robin, Batman
7th	(Bahrain) Sayed Hashim Ahmed	NASR|Tekken Master	Atrocitus, Brainiac
7th	(United States) Daris Daniel	T7G|DR Gross	Green Lantern, Black Adam

Guilty Gear Xrd REV 2
Place	Player	Alias	Character(s)
1st	(Japan) Omito Hashimoto	KSB|Omito	Johnny
2nd	(Japan)	/r/Kappa|T5M7	Leo
3rd	(Japan) Tezuka Kazuyoshi	Summit	Chipp
4th	(Japan)	Nage	Faust
5th	(Japan) Ryota Inoue	GGP|Kazunoko	Raven
5th	(Japan) Kazumitsu Ippongi	PurePure	Jack-O'
7th	(Japan) Hikaru Sato	310	Venom
7th	(Japan) Fukuda Norihiro	Teresa	Jam

The King of Fighters XIV
Place	Player	Alias	Character(s)
1st	(Taiwan) Chia-Hung Lin	HuomaoTV|E.T.	Leona/Daimon/Benimaru, Clark/Benimaru/Daimon, Billy/Leona/Benimaru, Meitenkun/Benimaru/Leona
2nd	(China) Zhuojun Zeng	DouyuTV|Xiao Hai	Kula/Benimaru/Iori, Robert/Kula/Iori
3rd	(Mexico) Luis Martinez	KCO|Luis Cha	Andy/Mai/Muimui
4th	(Taiwan) Chia-Chen Tseng	HuomaoTV|ZJZ	Benimaru/Mature/Athena, Meitenkun/Yuri/Mature, Yuri/Mature/Leona, Athena/Yuri/Mature
5th	(United Arab Emirates) Waqas Ali	GCCM|WhiteAshX	Nakoruru/Yuri/Athena, Mian/Yuri/Athena
5th	(Mexico) Ruber Partida	TC|Pako	Meitenkun/Luong/Muimui, Meitenkun/Luong/Mai
7th	(United States) Reynald Tacsuan	AS|Reynald	Gang-il/Geese/Meitenkun, Mian/Benimaru/Robert
7th	(Japan) Murakami Masanobu	Sanwa|M'	Kula/Benimaru/Iori
