= Birdie (Street Fighter) =

Street Fighter character

- Street Fighter character
- Birdie in Street Fighter Alpha 2
- First game: Street Fighter (1987)
- Designed by: Naoto "Bengus" Kuroshima (Alpha); Takayuki Nakamura (SFV)
- Voiced by: English: Paul Dobson (Street Fighter animated series) Michael Devon (Street Fighter Alpha: The Animation) T.J. Storm (Street Fighter V); Japanese: Wataru Takagi (Street Fighter Alpha, Street Fighter Alpha 2, Street Fighter Alpha 3) Hidenari Ugaki (Street Fighter V) Ryūzaburō Ōtomo (Street Fighter Alpha: The Animation)

In-universe information
- Origin: London, England, United Kingdom
- Nationality: British

Birdie (Japanese: バーディー, Hepburn: Bādī) is a character in the Street Fighter series. He first appeared in the original Street Fighter game in 1987 as a non-playable opponent before becoming playable in Street Fighter Alpha and the subsequent Alpha games. He was originally depicted with light skin in the original game, but is depicted with dark skin in Alpha, with the explanation being that he was pale due to an illness. He later appeared in Street Fighter V, though his design was made more fat compared to his Alpha design.

== Concept and creation ==
A punk representing the United Kingdom in the first Street Fighter game, Birdie originally was depicted with light skin and a simplistic design. When development began on Street Fighter Alpha, a game set between the events of the first Street Fighter and Street Fighter II, they wanted to show more of the series' character diversity without relying too deeply on II's cast. To this end, several characters from the first Street Fighter were included, one of which was Birdie. Artist Naoto "Bengus" Kuroshima handled the character's redesign, seeking advice from colleagues on how to proceed and figure out what would and wouldn't work. The design took a very different direction, with Bengus making light of the contrast between the designs by suggesting the character had been "kidnapped by aliens" in concept art notes. Though originally white even in early sprite line art, he was changed to be black as development progressed. Capcom later added an official explanation for this change in ethnicity by stating that he was paler in the first game due to an illness.

Towards the end of Street Fighter IV's downloadable content development, a new character, Decapre was introduced. Capcom expected her to be a huge success, and replace similar character, Cammy, in the game's followup which they had already started development on. As Cammy was British they felt the game would need another character to represent that country in Street Fighter V, and considered either Birdie or Dudley, a boxer that had appeared in Street Fighter III. The game's director, Takayuki Nakayama, wanted to include Birdie to add a "comedic character" to the game, taking inspiration from the character's previously displayed large appetite and low work ethic, and his feeling that the series lacked such characters. Several designs were considered at this point to reimagine him once more, including a punk rocker, a wrestling heel, and a "London punk" design that returned him to his original white appearance. Ultimately they settled on a design closer to his Alpha appearance, but with a pronounced stomach and a moveset that referenced his voracious appetite. When asked about this, series producer at the time Yoshinori Ono jokingly compared it to his own weight gain from working at Capcom, and felt the lifestyle Birdie was living during the events of the game helped justify it. Nakayama also felt that Birdie could fit the "tsukkomi" role in the game's storyline better than regular characters, and included him more actively in its presentation.

=== Design ===
He has multiple alternative costumes in Street Fighter V, including one that puts him in his original Street Fighter Alpha costume, getting rid of his gut and replacing it with abs.

== Appearances ==
Birdie first appeared in the original Street Fighter as one of multiple opponents that Ryu or Ken Masters had to fight. He later appeared in Street Fighter Alpha as a playable character before being included in Street Fighters Alpha 2 and 3 as well. He went unused in any Street Fighter games until he was added in Street Fighter V. His play style is "completely different" from past entries. Birdie is given an idle animation in Street Fighter V where he flicks snot, which is one of only few idle animations in the game capable of damaging an opponent. The story of Street Fighter V has Birdie freeload in Karin Kanzuki's house, becoming one of her allies to fight Shadaloo. Street Fighter V received digital trading cards, one of which being Birdie, which at one time was the most valuable of the cards. He appears as a card in SNK vs. Capcom: Card Fighters' Clash, and as a non-playable character in Super Gem Fighter Mini Mix.

Birdie appeared in a cameo role in the Street Fighter TV series. He also appeared in the anime adaptation Street Fighter Alpha: The Animation. Birdie appeared in the manga adaptation of Street Fighter Alpha, where he and Ryu are good friends.

=== Gameplay ===
When designing his moveset in Street Fighter V, Ono noted his chain as a standout element of Birdie's design, and thus made a point of incorporating it more into his moveset. They included moves that focus on manipulating the opponent's movement more than Birdie's, which Ono felt made him a more "reactive" character. He was a difficult opponent online due in part to one of his moves, EX Bull Revenger, which lead to nerfs.

== Reception ==
Birdie has been cited in particular as an example of how some perceive the Street Fighter series' poor handling of race, with Wired writer De'Angelo Epps calling him "the epitome of a Black caricature." ComicsAlliance writers Chris Sims and David Uzumeri questioned if the inclusion of the character Dudley in Street Fighter III was in response to player's reaction to Birdie, with Sims calling him "quite possibly the most racist video game character ever", and Uzumeri feeling the reason for his change in appearance for Alpha "messed up", to which Sims responded "Look, I am a lifetime Capcom fan, but the first time I saw Birdie, I seriously could not believe he was in the game." Other sources have examined the character within the scope of the series as a whole, with Kyle A. Harris noting that Birdie fit a similar racial template to fellow Street Fighter characters Balrog and Dee Jay as "hulking figures over six feet tall with extremely huge muscles and brash personalities." The paper "Contours of virtual enfreakment in fighting game characters", in the journal Technological Forecasting and Social Change, noted that while Birdie was an egregious example of negative portrayal, they questioned if his origin from the United Kingdom represented hesitance on the developers to not portray "too negative a stereotype for any specific group" by avoiding a "non-token" country.

His depiction in Street Fighter V has received mixed reception, with Kotaku staff calling his redesign "insulting", while Eurogamer writer Wesley Yin-Poole found his reimagining "stunningly successful" for a character most players forgot. VentureBeat writer Stephen Kleckner had long been hoping for Birdie to appear in a new Street Fighter game ever since Street Fighter IV, stating that he was a fan of Birdie's while noting that he was an "obscure choice" for inclusion. He stated that Birdie was his preferred character to use in the Street Fighter Alpha series, comparing him to a mixture of Balrog and Zangief and describing him as "incredibly mobile for a grappler designed character." Despite enjoying his character mechanically and having positive impressions of his depiction in Street Fighter V, he did not enjoy his visual change, calling it "lazy and disappointing." He contrasted visual depiction in Alpha, which he described as "large, yet lean and muscular" and "mysterious, calculative, and intelligent" with what he felt was "yet another obese, comedy relief oaf." This made him feel bittersweet over the announcement of his inclusion. Comic Book Resources writer Sage Ashford felt that while Birdie's design in Street Fighter Alpha was already unusual, citing his height and punk style, they found the changes made in Street Fighter V made him a negative stereotype of larger people, criticizing the fact that his only goal is unlimited food.

Some outlets, however, also offered praise. Paste praised the uniqueness of his playstyle compared to other "grappler" type characters in the series and an "Alpha series favorite", and noted that while he wasn't a crucial character to the franchise's storyline, they appreciated the humor and variety he helped bring to the games. Meanwhile, though Gavin Jasper of Den of Geek acknowledged him as the introduction of the "big brute" archetype in the series, he praised Birdie's redesign in the Alpha games and felt he was a significantly better character than Balrog due to his ambition of taking over Shadaloo and called him an "evil version of Jeffrey Lebowski." He also appreciated the character's portrayal in the Alpha manga, which showed him being grateful to Ryu despite his loss and displaying friendship, an aspect that carried on to his Street Fighter V appearance that made Gavin appreciate both characters more. He felt this made Birdie's turn as a "good guy" in V also make more sense, even if his character was driven by gluttony. He closed with "if you've never thrown around an opponent by strangling them with chains while growling that they should go to Hell, then you haven't lived."
