= Tokido =

Japanese computer games player

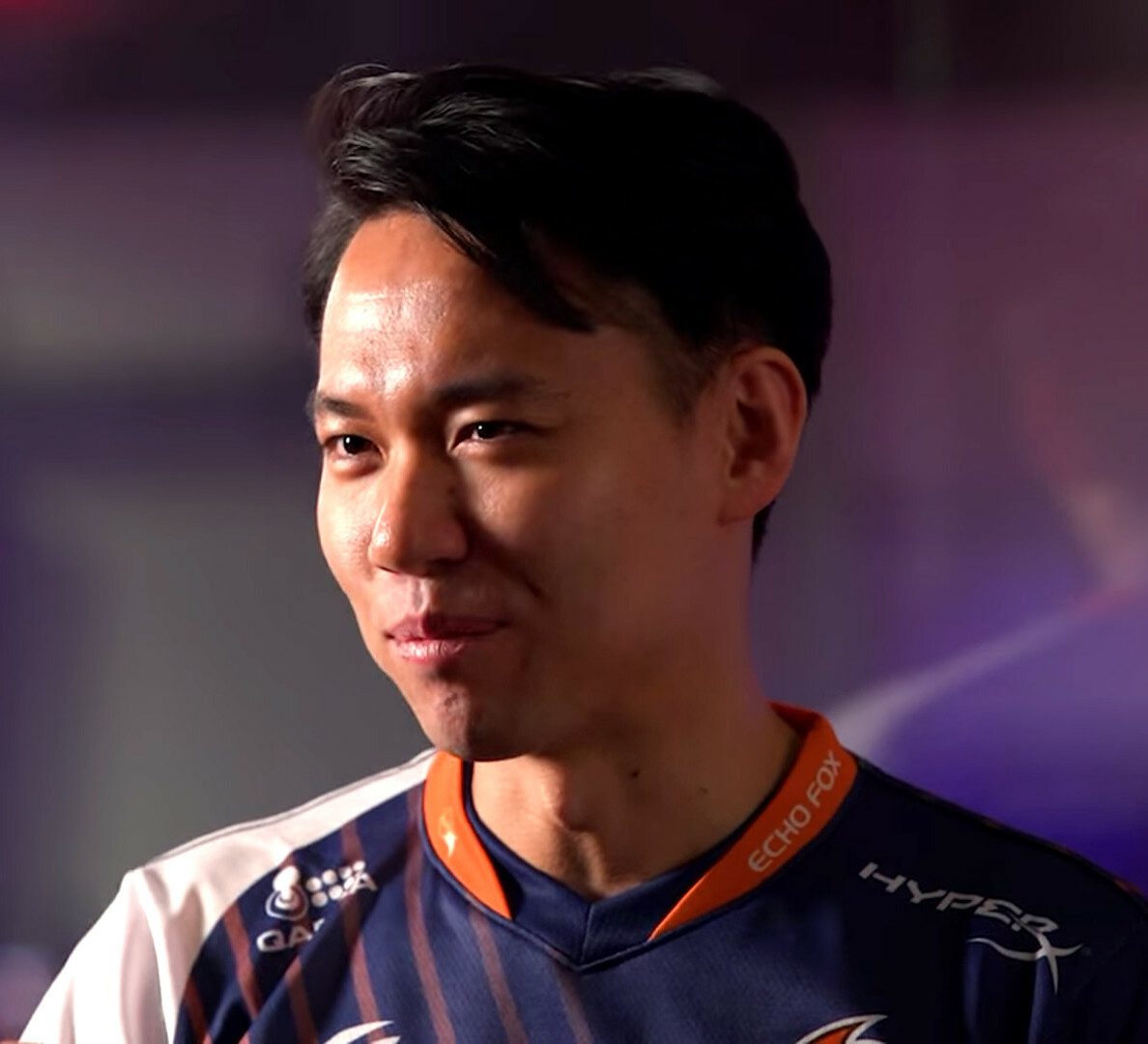
- Tokido in 2018

Personal information
- Name: Hajime Taniguchi
- Nickname: Murderface
- Born: 7 July 1985 (age 41); Okinawa, Japan
- Nationality: Japanese

Current team
- Team: Rohto Zi
- Game: Street Fighter 6

Career information
- Games: King of Fighters; Street Fighter
- Playing career: 2002–present

Team history
- 2011: The Traveling Circus
- 2011–2016: Mad Catz
- 2017–2019: Echo Fox
- 2019–present: Rohto Zi

Career highlights and awards
- 3× EVO champion (2002, 2007, 2017); 2× SBO champion (2003, 2005)

Hajime Taniguchi (Japanese: 谷口 一, Hepburn: Taniguchi Hajime; born 7 July 1985), better known as Tokido, is a Japanese fighting game player who plays the King of Fighters and Street Fighter franchises. He is known for playing multiple fighting games on a competitive level in addition to Street Fighter, including Tekken, Marvel vs Capcom 3, and BlazBlue. Tokido is a three-time EVO champion, having won Capcom vs. SNK 2 in 2002 as well as winning Super Street Fighter II Turbo in 2007 and Street Fighter V ten years later. Tokido has had 28 Evolution top 8 finishes (a feat surpassed only by Justin Wong), having EVO medals in 12 different games across more than 20 years.

== Career ==
Tokido was introduced to fighting games in the 1990s, when he played The King of Fighters '94 on the Neo Geo MVS. The first Street Fighter game Tokido came in contact with was Street Fighter 2 on the Super Famicom.

At CEO 2011 he took 1st place in Super Street Fighter 4 and Marvel vs Capcom 3 and took 3rd place in Tekken 6. Sponsored by Madcatz, Tokido was a highly successful King of Fighters XIII player in 2014. Tokido got into Street Fighter IV late compared to other high-level players. When he did, teammate Daigo Umehara suggested he pick the character Akuma, as a character like Ryu would be too difficult for him. Playing as Akuma, Tokido invented the "Tokido Vortex", a sequence of moves that nearly guarantees an opponent character will take damage.

A few months before Street Fighter V was released in February 2016, Tokido expressed a desire to make a change in his playstyle. Playing with a "more fundamental, grounded style" did not work out well at the 2015 Tokyo Game Show tournament, but he did win the 2015 Canada Cup a month later. The change in style prepared Tokido to use Ryu in Street Fighter V, as the game did not include Akuma at that point. Tokido reached second place multiple times during the 2016 Capcom Pro Tour, losing only to Infiltration at Final Round 19 and NorCal Regionals 2016. Tokido would eventually defeat Infiltration at the 2016 Community Effort Orlando in order to qualify for the Capcom Cup.

Tokido was released from Mad Catz in 2016, as the company was having financial trouble due to the poor sales of Rock Band 4. On January 4, 2017, it was confirmed that Echo Fox had picked up Tokido.

After his signature character Akuma was released for Street Fighter V, Tokido would go on to win the game's tournament at Evo 2017.

== Legacy ==
In 2016, a Yahoo Esports article described Tokido as a "fighting game legend," as a veteran of numerous battles spanning over a decade. Tokido is considered to be one of Japan's five "fighting game gods", a title he shares with Daigo Umehara, Shinya Onuki, Tatsuya Haitani, and Naoto Sako.

Tokido is known for taking on a somewhat eccentric persona on stage. Footage exists of Tokido imitating some of Akuma's taunts, and trash-talking his opponent Bonchan shortly before a tournament in 2015 became highly discussed among the fighting game community. In 2015, Tokido stated that he is meaning to leave such behavior behind him because, as a professional gamer, he wants "to show that entertainment in game, not out of it."

== Achievements ==
Year	Tournament		Game	Place	Character	Note
2018	CAPCOM PRO TOUR RANKING (as of December 16)			1st		
2018	(United States) Capcom Cup 2018		Street Fighter V Arcade Edition	17th	Akuma	
2018	(United States) Red Bull Conquest		Street Fighter V Arcade Edition	2nd	Akuma	
2018	Canada Cup 2018		Street Fighter V Arcade Edition	1st	Akuma	
2018	(Singapore) SEA Major 2018	Asia Regional Finals	Street Fighter V Arcade Edition	2nd	Akuma	
2018	(Singapore) SEA Major 2018	Premier Tournament	Street Fighter V Arcade Edition	2nd	Akuma	
2018	(Japan) Tokyo Game Show 2018		Street Fighter V Arcade Edition	1st	Akuma	
2018	(Taiwan) TWFighter Major 2018		Street Fighter V Arcade Edition	2nd	Akuma	
2018	(United States) Evo 2018		Street Fighter V Arcade Edition	2nd	Akuma	
2018	(United States) ELEAGUE 2018		Street Fighter V Arcade Edition	1st	Akuma	
2018	(Australia) Battle Arena Melbourne 10		Street Fighter V Arcade Edition	1st	Akuma	
2018	(United States) NorCal Regionals 2018		Street Fighter V Arcade Edition	1st	Akuma	
2018	(Thailand) Thaiger Uppercut 2018		Street Fighter V Arcade Edition	1st	Akuma	
2018	(Japan) RAGE Byakko Cup 2018		Street Fighter V Arcade Edition	1st	Akuma	
2018	(United States) Final Round 2018		Street Fighter V Arcade Edition	2nd	Akuma	
2018	Evo Japan 2018		Street Fighter V Arcade Edition	4th	Akuma	
2017	CAPCOM PRO TOUR YEAR-END RANKING			2nd		
2017	(United States) Capcom Cup 2017		Street Fighter V Arcade Edition	2nd	Akuma	
2017	(Singapore) SEA Major 2017	Asia Regional Finals	Street Fighter V Arcade Edition	1st	Akuma	
2017	(Singapore) SEA Major 2017	Last Chance Qualifier	Street Fighter V Arcade Edition	1st	Akuma	
2017	(Japan) Tokyo Game Show 2017		Street Fighter V	2nd	Akuma	
2017	(United States) The Brooklyn Beatdown Round 2		Street Fighter V	1st	Akuma	
2017	(China) LAN Story Cup 2017		Street Fighter V	2nd	Akuma	
2017	(China) Ze 2017		Street Fighter V	1st	Akuma	
2017	(China) U-League 4		Street Fighter V	2nd	Akuma	
2017	(United States) Evo 2017		Street Fighter V	1st	Akuma	
2017	(Vietnam) Saigon Cup 2017		Street Fighter V	3rd	Akuma	
2017	(Australia) Battle Arena Melbourne 9		Street Fighter V	4th	Akuma	
2017	(France) Ultimate Fighting Arena 2017		Street Fighter V	4th	Akuma	
2017	(Japan) Topanga League 6		Street Fighter V	4th	Akuma	
2016	CAPCOM PRO TOUR YEAR-END RANKING			2nd		
2016	(United States) Red Bull Battlegrounds 2016	NA Regional Finals	Street Fighter V	2nd	Ryu	
2016	(United States) Red Bull Battlegrounds 2016	Last Chance Qualifier	Street Fighter V	1st	Ryu	
2016	[ONLINE] Asia-Oceania Two		Street Fighter V	4th	Ryu	
2016	(Singapore) SEA Major 2016		Street Fighter V	1st	Ryu	
2016	(United States) The Brooklyn Beatdown		Street Fighter V	3rd	Ryu	
2016	(Chile) Never Give Up 2016		Street Fighter V	2nd	Ryu	
2016	(Japan) AbemaTV Cup 2016		Street Fighter V	2nd	Ryu	
2016	(Japan) Rage Vol. 2		Street Fighter V	3rd	Ryu	
2016	(United States) Community Effort Orlando 2016		Street Fighter V	1st	Ryu	
2016	(Sweden) DreamHack Summer 2016		Street Fighter V	3rd	Ryu	
2016	(Taiwan) TWFighter Major 2016		Street Fighter V	2nd	Ryu	
2016	(France) Stunfest 2016		Street Fighter V	3rd	Ryu	
2016	(France) Red Bull Kumite 2016		Street Fighter V	2nd	Ryu	
2016	(United States) NorCal Regionals 2016		Street Fighter V	2nd	Ryu	
2016	(United States) Final Round 19		Street Fighter V	2nd	Ryu	
2015	CAPCOM PRO TOUR YEAR-END RANKING			7th		
2015	Canada Cup 2015		Ultra Street Fighter IV	1st	Akuma	
2015	(China) Asia Shanghai Qualifier 2015		Ultra Street Fighter IV	3rd	Akuma	
2015	(China) Sino Duel 2015		Ultra Street Fighter IV	3rd	Akuma	
2015	(Thailand) SEA Major 2015		Ultra Street Fighter IV	2nd	Akuma	
2015	(Germany) FFM-Rumble 2015		Ultra Street Fighter IV	4th	Akuma	
2015	(Japan) KVO 2015		Ultra Street Fighter IV	3rd	Akuma	
2015	(France) Stunfest 2015		Ultra Street Fighter IV	4th	Akuma	
2015	(Scotland) Hypespotting 4		Ultra Street Fighter IV	2nd	Akuma	
2015	(Scotland) Hypespotting 4		The King of Fighters XIII	1st	EX- Duo Lon/Iori/Chin	
2015	(France) Red Bull Kumite 2015		Ultra Street Fighter IV	2nd	Akuma	
2015	(United States) SXSW Fighters Invitational 2015		Ultra Street Fighter IV	4th	Akuma	
2014	CAPCOM PRO TOUR YEAR-END RANKING			26th		
2014	(Japan) Taito Arcade Nationals 2014		Ultra Street Fighter IV (3-on-3)	2nd	Tokido (Akuma), Mago (Yang), Daigo (Evil Ryu)	
2014	(United States) Evo 2014		The King of Fighters XIII	2nd	EX- Iori/Mr.Karate/Chin	
2014	(Japan) Topanga Charity Cup 4		Ultra Street Fighter IV (5-on-5)	1st	Tokido (Akuma), Sako (Ibuki), Fuudo (Fei Long), Kazunoko (Yun), Bonchan (Sagat)	
2014	(Singapore) SEA Major 2014		Ultra Street Fighter IV	4th	Akuma	
2014	(United States) Northwest Majors 2014		Super Street Fighter IV: Arcade Edition v2012	1st	Akuma	
2014	(United States) Northwest Majors 2014		The King of Fighters XIII	1st	EX- Iori/Mr.Karate/Kim	
2014	(Japan) Super Street Fighter IV CR Edition Commemoration		Super Street Fighter IV: Arcade Edition v2012	1st	Akuma	
2014	(South Korea) Café ID Global Tournament 2014		Super Street Fighter IV: Arcade Edition v2012	2nd	Akuma	
2013	(Japan) Topanga League 3B		Super Street Fighter IV: Arcade Edition v2012	4th	Akuma	
2013	(Australia) Shadowloo Showdown 2013		Super Street Fighter IV: Arcade Edition	1st	Akuma	
2013	(Australia) Shadowloo Showdown 2013		Ultimate Marvel vs. Capcom 3	4th	Nova/Spencer/Dr.Strange	
2013	(Australia) Shadowloo Showdown 2013		The King of Fighters XIII	2nd	EX- Iori/Mr.Karate/Kim	
2013	Canada Cup 2013		Super Street Fighter IV: Arcade Edition v2012 (5-on-5)	1st	Tokido (Akuma), Mago (Fei Long), Bonchan (Sagat), Fuudo (Fei Long), Kazunoko (Yun)	
2013	Canada Cup 2013		Street Fighter X Tekken	1st	Chun-Li/Nina	
2013	Canada Cup 2013		Ultimate Marvel vs. Capcom 3	4th	Nova/Dr.Strange/Spencer	
2013	Canada Cup 2013		Tekken Tag Tournament 2	3rd	Eddy, Lars	
2013	Canada Cup 2013		The King of Fighters XIII	2nd	EX- Iori/Mr.Karate/Kim	
2013	(United States) Evo 2013		Super Street Fighter IV: Arcade Edition v2012	2nd	Akuma	
2013	(United States) Evo 2013		The King of Fighters XIII	4th	EX- Iori/Mr.Karate/Kim	
2013	(Japan) Topanga Charity Cup 3		Super Street Fighter IV: Arcade Edition v2012 (5-on-5)	2nd	Tokido (Akuma), Jyobin (Ryu), Nyanshi (Sagat), Mago (Fei Long), Daigo (Ryu)	
2013	(Singapore) SEA Major 2013		Super Street Fighter IV: Arcade Edition v2012	4th	Akuma	
2013	(Singapore) SEA Major 2013		Street Fighter X Tekken	1st	Dhalsim/Nina, Cammy/Nina	
2013	(Singapore) SEA Major 2013		Ultimate Marvel vs. Capcom 3	3rd	Nova/Dr.Strange/Spencer	
2013	(Singapore) SEA Major 2013		The King of Fighters XIII	2nd	EX- Mr.Karate/Chin/Kim	
2013	(Singapore) SEA Major 2013		Persona 4 Arena	2nd	Mitsuru	
2013	(Canada) April Duels 2		Super Street Fighter IV: Arcade Edition v2012	3rd	Akuma	
2013	(Canada) April Duels 2		Street Fighter X Tekken	1st	Dhalsim/Nina, Cammy/Nina	
2013	(Canada) April Duels 2		Ultimate Marvel vs. Capcom 3	3rd	Magneto/Doctor Doom/Vergil	
2013	(Canada) April Duels 2		The King of Fighters XIII	1st	EX- Mr.Karate/Kim/Hwa	
2013	(France) World Game Cup 2013		Super Street Fighter IV: Arcade Edition v2012	1st	Akuma	
2013	(France) World Game Cup 2013		Super Street Fighter IV: Arcade Edition v2012 (5-on-5)	3rd	Tokido (Akuma), Mago (Fei Long), Itabashi Zangief (Zangief), Hameko21 (Rufus), Kamichang (Rose)	
2013	(France) World Game Cup 2013		Street Fighter III: 3rd Strike	1st	Chun-Li	
2013	(France) World Game Cup 2013		The King of Fighters XIII	2nd	Mr.Karate/Chin/Hwa	
2013	(Kuwait) K.O. Fighting Game Festival 2013		Super Street Fighter IV: Arcade Edition v2012 (3-on-3)	1st	Tokido (Akuma), Daigo Umehara (Ryu), Mago (Fei Long)	
2013	(Kuwait) K.O. Fighting Game Festival 2013		Ultimate Marvel vs. Capcom 3	2nd	Magneto/Doctor Doom/Phoenix	
2013	(Germany) Da Ultimate Crushing 2K13 X GodsGarden Europe		Super Street Fighter IV: Arcade Edition v2012	1st	Akuma	
2013	(Germany) Da Ultimate Crushing 2K13 X GodsGarden Europe		Ultimate Marvel vs. Capcom 3	1st	Magneto/Doctor Doom/Phoenix|Vergil	
2013	(Germany) Da Ultimate Crushing 2K13 X GodsGarden Europe		Tekken Tag Tournament 2	1st	Eddy, Lars	
2013	(Germany) Da Ultimate Crushing 2K13 X GodsGarden Europe		The King of Fighters XIII	1st	EX- Mr.Karate/Hwa/Iori	
2013	(Germany) Da Ultimate Crushing 2K13 X GodsGarden Europe		Dead or Alive	2nd	Jann Lee	
2013	(Japan) TOPANGA Z League 2013		Ultimate Marvel vs. Capcom 3	2nd	Magneto/Doctor Doom/Phoenix	
2012	(United States) Street Fighter 25th Anniversary Global Tournament		Super Street Fighter IV: Arcade Edition v2012	4th	Akuma	
2012	(United States) Street Fighter 25th Anniversary Global Tournament		Street Fighter III: 3rd Strike	2nd	Chun-Li	
2012	(United States) Street Fighter 25th Anniversary Global Tournament		Street Fighter X Tekken	2nd	Dhalsim, Cody	
2012	Canada Cup 2012		Super Street Fighter IV: Arcade Edition v2012 (5-on-5)	1st	Tokido (Akuma), Fuudo (Fei Long), Bonchan (Sagat), Kazunoko (Yun), Mago (Adon)	
2012	Canada Cup 2012		Ultimate Marvel vs. Capcom 3	3rd	Magneto/Doctor Doom/Phoenix	
2012	Canada Cup 2012		Tekken Tag Tournament 2	4th	Lars, Bruce	
2012	Canada Cup 2012		The King of Fighters XIII	2nd	EX- Kim/Hwa/Iori	
2012	Canada Cup 2012		Dead or Alive 5	1st	Jann Lee, Kokoro, Hitomi	
2012	Canada Cup 2012		Persona 4 Arena	1st	Mitsuru	
2012	(Japan) Street Fighter 25th Anniversary Official National Tournament		Street Fighter X Tekken	1st	Dhalsim, Cody	
2012	Brazil Street Fighter 25th Anniversary		Super Street Fighter IV: Arcade Edition v2012	2nd	Akuma	
2012	Brazil Street Fighter 25th Anniversary		Street Fighter III: 3rd Strike	1st	Chun-Li	
2012	Brazil Street Fighter 25th Anniversary		Super Street Fighter II Turbo	1st	Vega	
2012	Brazil Street Fighter 25th Anniversary		Street Fighter X Tekken	1st	Dhalsim, Cody	
2012	(United States) Evo 2012		Street Fighter X Tekken (2-on-2)	3rd	Tokido (Chun-Li), Fuudo (Ryu)	
2012	(Australia) Shadowloo Showdown 2012		Super Street Fighter IV: Arcade Edition v2012	4th	Akuma	
2012	(Australia) Shadowloo Showdown 2012		Street Fighter III: 3rd Strike	2nd	Chun-Li	
2012	(Australia) Shadowloo Showdown 2012		Street Fighter X Tekken	4th	Ken, Rufus	
2012	(Australia) Shadowloo Showdown 2012		The King of Fighters XIII	2nd	EX- Mr.Karate/Kyo/Iori	
2012	(Australia) Shadowloo Showdown 2012		Soul Calibur V	1st	Viola	
2012	(Japan) Topanga Charity Cup 2		Super Street Fighter IV: Arcade Edition v2012 (5-on-5)	4th	Tokido (Akuma), Mago (Fei Long), Bonchan (Sagat), Fuudo (Fei Long), Daigo (Ryu)	
2012	(France) World Game Cup 2012		Super Street Fighter IV: Arcade Edition	1st	Akuma	
2012	(France) World Game Cup 2012		Super Street Fighter IV: Arcade Edition (3-on-3)	1st	Tokido (Akuma), Fuudo (Fei Long), Mago (Sagat)	
2012	(France) World Game Cup 2012		Super Street Fighter IV: Arcade Edition (5-on-5)	1st	Tokido (Akuma), Fuudo (Fei Long), Mago (Adon), RF (Sagat), Bas (Cammy),	
2012	(France) World Game Cup 2012		Ultimate Marvel vs. Capcom 3	3rd	Magneto/Doctor Doom/Phoenix	
2012	(France) World Game Cup 2012		Ultimate Marvel vs. Capcom 3 (2-on-2)	2nd	Tokido (Magneto/Doctor Doom/Phoenix), Mago (Wesker/Magneto/Vergil), Fuudo (Zero/Morrigan/Vergil)	
2012	(France) World Game Cup 2012		Street Fighter III: 3rd Strike	1st	Chun Li	
2012	(France) World Game Cup 2012		Street Fighter III: 3rd Strike (2-on-2)	1st	Tokido (Chun Li), Fuudo (Ken)	
2012	(France) World Game Cup 2012		BlazBlue: Continuum Shift Extend	1st	Arakune	
2011	Canada Cup 2011		Super Street Fighter IV: Arcade Edition	4th	Akuma	
2011	Canada Cup 2011		Super Street Fighter IV: Arcade Edition (5-on-5)	3rd	Tokido (Akuma), Mago (Fei Long), Bonchan (Sagat), Neurosis (Bison), Momochi (Cody)	
2011	Canada Cup 2011		Super Street Fighter II Turbo HD Remix	3rd	Akuma	
2011	Canada Cup 2011		Marvel vs Capcom 3	3rd	Wolverine, Sentinel, Phoenix	
2011	Canada Cup 2011		BlazBlue: Continuum Shift	1st		
2011	(United States) Season's Beatings Velocity		Super Street Fighter IV: Arcade Edition	4th	Akuma	
2011	(Japan) Nagoya Street Battle X MadCatz		Super Street Fighter IV: Arcade Edition (3-on-3)	1st	Tokido, Daigo, Mago	
2011	(Japan) Nagoya Street Battle 30		Super Street Fighter IV: Arcade Edition (3-on-3)	1st	Tokido (Akuma), Daigo (Yun), Mago (Fei Long)	
2011	(Japan) GodsGarden #4		Super Street Fighter IV: Arcade Edition	4th	Akuma	
2011	(United States) Evo 2011		BlazBlue: Continuum Shift II	3rd	Noel	
2011	(Australia) Shadowloo Showdown 2011		Super Street Fighter IV: Arcade Edition	4th	Akuma	
2011	(Australia) Shadowloo Showdown 2011		Super Street Fighter IV: Arcade Edition (3-on-3)	1st	Tokido (Akuma), Mago (Fei Long), GamerBee (Adon)	
2011	(Australia) Shadowloo Showdown 2011		Marvel vs Capcom 3	1st	Wolverine, Sentinel, Phoenix	
2011	(Australia) Shadowloo Showdown 2011		Tekken 6	1st		
2011	(United States) Community Effort Orlando 2011		Super Street Fighter IV: Arcade Edition	1st	Akuma	
2011	(United States) Community Effort Orlando 2011		Marvel vs Capcom 3	1st	Wolverine, Sentinel, Phoenix	
2011	(United States) Community Effort Orlando 2011		Tekken 6	3rd	Bob	
2011	(France) Stunfest 2011		Super Street Fighter IV: Arcade Edition	1st	Akuma	
2011	(France) Stunfest 2011		Marvel vs Capcom 3	1st	Phoenix, Sentinel, Wolverine	
2011	(France) Stunfest 2011		BlazBlue: Continuum Shift	1st	Litchi Faye-Ling	
2011	(Japan) Topanga Charity Cup 1		Super Street Fighter IV: Arcade Edition (5-on-5)	1st	Tokido (Akuma), Mago (Fei Long), Nyanshi (Sagat), Bonchan (Sagat), Daigo (Yun)	
2011	(United States) Final Round XIV		Super Street Fighter IV	2nd	Tokido (Akuma)	
2011	(United States) Final Round XIV		Super Street Fighter IV (3-on-3)	1st	Tokido (Akuma), Ricky Ortiz (Rufus), Justin Wong	
2011	(United States) Final Round XIV		Marvel vs Capcom 3 (3-on-3)	1st	Tokido (Wolverine/Akuma/Sentinel), Justin Wong (She-Hulk/Amaterasu/Tron Bonne), Ricky Ortiz (Trish/Chun-Li/Phoenix)	
2011	(Switzerland) Beat By Contest 2011		Super Street Fighter IV	1st	Akuma	
2010	(Australia) Shadowloo Showdown 2010		Super Street Fighter IV	2nd	Akuma	
2010	(United States) SoCal Regionals 2010		Super Street Fighter IV	3rd	Akuma, Fei Long	
2010	(United States) SoCal Regionals 2010		Street Fighter III: 3rd Strike	1st	Chun-Li	
2010	(United States) SoCal Regionals 2010		BlazBlue: Continuum Shift	1st	Bang	
2010	(Japan) Nagoya Street Battle 17		Super Street Fighter IV (3-on-3)	3rd	Tokido (Akuma, Honda), Kindevu (Cammy), Eita (Akuma, Adon)	
2010	(Japan) Super Battle Opera 2010		Street Fighter IV (3-on-3)	3rd	Tokido (Akuma), Mago (Sagat), Nemo (Chun-Li)	
2010	(Japan) Super Battle Opera 2010		Street Fighter III: 3rd Strike (3-on-3)	3rd	Tokido (Chun-Li), Ochibi (Yun), Kenzo (Yang)	
2010	(Japan) Nagoya Street Battle 15		Super Street Fighter IV (3 on 3)	2nd	Tokido (Akuma), Mago (Fei Long), Daigo (Ryu)	
2010	(France) Stunfest 2010		Super Street Fighter IV	3rd	Akuma	
2010	(France) Stunfest 2010		Super Street Fighter IV (2 on 2)	2nd	Tokido (Akuma), Jims (Ken)	
2010	(France) Stunfest 2010		Street Fighter III: 3rd Strike	2nd	Chun-Li	
2010	(France) Stunfest 2010		Street Fighter III: 3rd Strike (3-on-3)	1st	Tokido (Chun-Li), Otana (Urien), Valentin (Necro)	
2010	(France) Stunfest 2010		Super Street Fighter II Turbo	2nd	Vega	
2010	(France) Stunfest 2010		Super Street Fighter II Turbo HD Remix (2-on-2)	1st	Tokido (Vega), NKI (Chun-Li)	
2010	(France) Stunfest 2010		Capcom vs. SNK 2	1st	A- Sakura/Bison/Blanka	
2010	(France) Stunfest 2010		BlazBlue: Continuum Shift (2-on-2)	1st	Tokido (Litchi Faye-Ling), Karim (Lambda 11)	
2010	(Japan) GodsGarden #2		Street Fighter IV	1st	Akuma	
2009	(Japan) Super Battle Opera 2009		Street Fighter III: 3rd Strike (2-on-2)	2nd	Tokido (Chun-Li), KO (Yun)	
2008	(United States) Evo 2008		Street Fighter III: 3rd Strike	4th	Chun-Li, Urien	
2008	(United States) Evo 2008		Super Street Fighter II Turbo	4th	Vega	
2007	(United States) Evo 2007		Super Street Fighter II Turbo	1st	Vega	
2007	(United States) Evo 2007		Street Fighter III: 3rd Strike	2nd	Chun Li, Urien	
2007	(United States) Evo 2007		Virtua Fighter 5	4th	Pai	
2006	(United States) Evo 2006		Hyper Street Fighter II	3rd	CE-Bison	
2006	(Japan) Super Battle Opera 2006		Samurai Shodown VI (2-on-2)	3rd	Tokido (Mina), Reoth (Iroha)	
2005	(United States) Evo 2005		Super Street Fighter II Turbo	3rd	Vega	
2005	(Japan) Super Battle Opera 2005		Capcom Fighting Jam (2-on-2)	1st	Tokido (Jedah/Urien), Mago (Karin/Anakaris)	
2004	(Japan) Super Battle Opera 2004		Capcom vs. SNK 2 (3-on-3)	3rd	Tokido (N- Vega/Sagat/Blanka), Nuki (N- Akuma/Chun-Li/Sagat), Inoue (K- Sagat/Cammy/Blanka)	
2003	(Japan) Super Battle Opera 2003		Capcom vs. SNK 2	1st	A- Sakura/Bison/Blanka	
2002	(United States) Evo 2002		Capcom vs. SNK 2	1st	N- Honda/Blanka/Sagat	
