= Hilton Anaheim =

Hilton-branded hotel in Anaheim, California, United States

- Interactive map of the Hilton Anaheim area

General information
- Location: 777 West Convention Way, Anaheim, CA, 92802
- Coordinates: 33°48′02″N 117°55′06″W
- Opened: 1984

Technical details
- Floor count: 14

Other information
- Number of rooms: 1,572
- Number of suites: 93
- Number of restaurants: MIX Restaurant, MIX Lounge, Pool Bar & Grill, Starbucks

Website
- HiltonAnaheimHotel.com

The Hilton Anaheim is a hotel located in Anaheim, California, United States, next to the Anaheim Convention Center. It originally opened as the Anaheim Hilton and Towers in 1984, in time for The Los Angeles Olympic Games. Hilton Anaheim is the largest hotel in Orange County and the second-largest hotel in all of Southern California with 1,572 guestrooms. The Hilton Anaheim has one of the largest meeting spaces in Orange County, with over 100,000 square feet (9,300 m^{2}) of meeting and event space and is adjacent to the Anaheim Convention Center. The hotel is near the Disneyland Resort and the Anaheim GardenWalk.
