= Cammy =

Street Fighter character

Cammy White
- Street Fighter character
- Cammy in Street Fighter II: The Movie
- First game: Super Street Fighter II (1993)
- Created by: Akira "Akiman" Yasuda
- Voiced by: English: Lisa Ann Beley (Street Fighter cartoon); Debra Jean Rogers (SFII: The Animated Movie, SFII V Animaze); Susan Hart (X-Men vs. Street Fighter, Street Fighter Alpha 2 Gold, Marvel vs. Capcom 2, Capcom vs. SNK); Carol Matthews (SFII V ADV #1); Shawn Taylor (SFII V ADV #2); Alexis Martino (Street Fighter motion comics); Caitlin Glass (games, 2007–present); Japanese: Akiko Koumoto (SF Alpha 3, Namco x Capcom); Miki Nagasawa (Capcom vs. SNK 2); Yōko Sasaki (SFII V, SFII: The Animated Movie); Kotono Mitsuishi (SFII drama CD, Real Battle on Film); Maya Okamoto (Japanese dub of the Street Fighter film); Miyuki Sawashiro (games, 2007–present)
- Portrayed by: Kylie Minogue (Street Fighter film, games); Mel Jarnson (2026 film)

In-universe information
- Fighting style: Shadaloo mixed martial arts (Shadaloo) special forces mixed martial arts
- Origin: United Kingdom
- Nationality: English

Cammy White (Japanese: キャミィ・ホワイト, Hepburn: Kyamī Howaito), also known by the codename Killer Bee (キラービー, Kirā Bī), is a fictional character in the Street Fighter fighting game series created by Capcom. She debuted in Super Street Fighter II: The New Challengers (1993). She has also been featured in the Street Fighter Alpha games, first as a secret character and then as a playable character. The games explore her backstory as one of M. Bison's "dolls" turned into an amnesiac operative for MI6.

Cammy has also appeared in other Street Fighter media, such as the 1994 live-action Street Fighter film and its animated spin-off, as well as Street Fighter II: The Animated Movie, where she first received her full name prior to being integrated into the later mainline games. She has also been featured in various official comics and merchandise, as well as in the crossover series Marvel vs. Capcom and SNK vs. Capcom. Cammy has garnered positive critical reception from critics and fans, with praise towards her backstory, gameplay, and character design. She is a frequent subject of cosplay and is particularly noted for her sex appeal. Cammy is one of the most popular characters in the series, often receiving high rankings in fan polls.

== Character design ==
Capcom's research and development head Noritaka Funamizu stated that Cammy's inclusion in Super Street Fighter II stemmed from his feeling that the game needed another female character besides Chun-Li. She was originally designed by the same person who had previously made Street Fighter's Sagat and later also Morrigan Aensland for Darkstalkers. Compensating for the difference in sheer strength, Chun-Li and Cammy are faster than the other characters in the game.

Cammy is a fighter with a small frame and a slender, yet muscular body. She has long blonde hair which she usually wears in two braided pigtails, blue eyes and a scar on her left cheek. In Super Street Fighter II, she is shown wearing a green sleeveless thong leotard, a military red beret, red gauntlets with armguards and black combat boots, with natural-colored pantyhose decorated with green camouflage stains. This iconic incarnation is known as Delta Red Cammy and appears in the Street Fighter II series of games, in the American film and television productions, in several manga and comic book adaptations, in the home versions of Street Fighter IV and its updates. Street Fighter V retains largely the same look, with the addition of a black harness on her torso and a gun holster around her right thigh, but she no longer wears the camouflage pantyhose. This latter variation is used as her "classic" costume in Street Fighter 6.

Akira Yasuda's concept art of Shadaloo Cammy in X-Men vs. Street Fighter

A different look was introduced in X-Men vs. Street Fighter, where her style and moves are similar to those of both Spider-Man and Psylocke. This time, Cammy was depicted wearing a light blue, long sleeve thong leotard, a matching garrison cap, brown leather boots, and a small yellow necktie. The red gauntlets were kept, with the addition of an elbow pad on the right side. The camouflage of her legs was replaced with blue stains in the shape of lightning bolts. This incarnation is known as Shadaloo Cammy or "Killer Bee" and appears in the Street Fighter Alpha, Marvel vs. Capcom and Capcom vs. SNK series of games, as well as in Namco × Capcom and in several manga and comic adaptations. Shadaloo Cammy is approximately 16 years old.

In Street Fighter IV, in addition to the Delta Red attire, her default, Cammy has an alternate appearance which is reminiscent of the Shadaloo version. This consists of her wearing a blue zipped-up fleece thong leotard with matching knee-high boots with woolen trim, a Delta Red garrison cap, midnight-blue gloves and arm braces, and blue camouflage on her legs. She wears a costume reminiscent of this in the 2026 live-action Street Fighter film. In the consecutive Super Street Fighter IV, she gains an additional alternate costume based on M. Bison's, mostly by its red color and the similarly shaped hat and accessories. However, she still wears a thong leotard and camouflage paint on her legs. Her fourth alternative costume in the game has her in a catgirl-like costume, alluding to her fondness for cats, with metal gauntlets and leg coverings. In Street Fighter X Tekken, Cammy gains an additional two alternate costumes: one is based on King from Tekken, and the second is an all-original design inspired by a punk rock type of look, with her sporting a huge red bow, a black vest with a pink top, a red skirt with leather straps and black leather knee-high boots; she also got a leopard motif costume in an update. In Street Fighter V, Cammy has various different alternate outfits, from a combat swimsuit to a schoolgirl uniform, along with another catgirl outfit. One of her poses in that game was adjusted due to changing cultural attitudes. In Street Fighter 6, in addition to being older, Cammy now has an entirely new outfit, consisting of a bob haircut with her classic front hair bangs, a turquoise blue leather jacket with belt straps and a union jack, a black crop top with white trim, black leggings with a white linear design, red combat boots with black socks, and her classic arm gauntlets with slight modifications to them.

Cammy has a strong personality. She has a tough attitude, where one wrong word to her could mean a snapped neck, and is fearless in battle. She refuses to go down without a fight, using her extensive skills and abilities to her advantage. She is a driven and determined young woman; with a strong sense to help others in need. She wants to see herself as a protector of others as noted in her Street Fighter V story where she is seen taking care of Juni and looking out for her as she recovers from being a brainwashed Doll. Cammy is gentle, respectful, and kindhearted, but she can also be very irritable and dismissive, and can be very harsh on herself when she makes mistakes. One of Cammy's most notable characteristics is her love for cats.

== Appearances ==
=== Street Fighter games ===
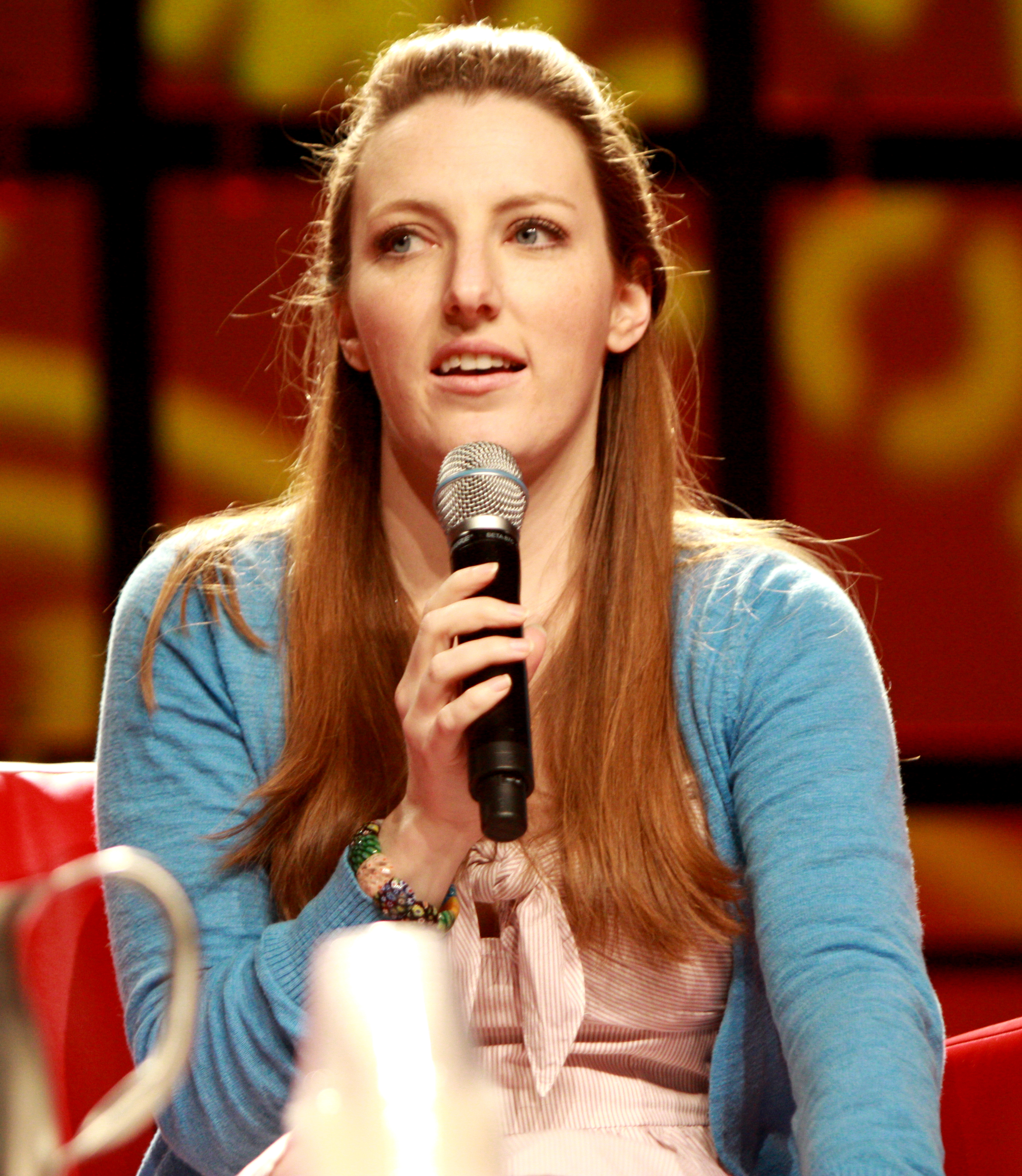
Caitlin Glass, Cammy's English-language voice actress since Street Fighter IV. Her role was well received in Japan.

Cammy was introduced in the fourth Street Fighter II revision, Super Street Fighter II: The New Challengers, as one of four new characters joining the previous games's roster. In this game, Cammy is a teen-aged agent of the fictional Delta Red commando task force within Britain's Secret Intelligence Service (MI6) formed to investigate and eradicate global crime syndicates. In the Japanese version of her ending, she is revealed to have been an agent working for the villain M. Bison in the past, but lost her memories during a past operation. The American version instead reported her as a previous lover of M. Bison's, but still having challenges related to amnesia. Other members of Delta Red include Commander Watson, Colonel Wolfman, Lt. Col. Hannah Ackerson (a relatively new addition), 1st Lieutenant Lita Luwanda (who treats Cammy as a little sister), Matthew McCoy, and George Ginzu.

A younger version of Cammy appears as an assassin working for Bison's Shadaloo organization, with the codename "Killer Bee" (and in later games described as one of the "Shadaloo Dolls"), first in Street Fighter Alpha 2 Gold, where she appears as a hidden character available exclusively in the second player and training modes (however, this would be rectified in Street Fighter Alpha Anthology where she would be fully playable in Arcade mode with a complete storyline and ending), and then in Street Fighter Alpha 3, where she is a full-fledged playable character. In Alpha 3, Cammy is revealed to be a clone created from M. Bison's DNA. The Game Boy Advance version of Super Street Fighter II Turbo: Revival and the Xbox Live and PSN remake Super Street Fighter II Turbo HD Remix take into account this revelation in their versions of Cammy's ending.

Cammy is again featured in Street Fighter IV. Set after the events of Street Fighter II (but before Street Fighter III), it depicts Cammy as having come to terms with her past as a brainwashed super soldier from Shadaloo and is now embarking a new mission with her Delta Red comrades (which include Commander Watson, Matthew McCoy, Colonel Wolfman, 1st Lieutenant Luwanda, and George Ginzu). This is the first time since the Street Fighter II era that Cammy has appeared in her Delta Red depiction as opposed to her Shadaloo depiction, and also the very first time in which she actually speaks with an English accent as per Cammy's birthplace being officially listed as Britain. However, due to her nature as a clone of Bison, this might not be her true place of origin. In her ending in this game, she destroys the BLECE data, believing the project to be what Bison had used to brainwash her in the first place. In the update Super Street Fighter IV, Cammy still remembers her time as a "doll" and affectionately refers to the "Dolls" as her sisters, vowing to rescue them from Shadaloo. Her penultimate, "rival" fight is against newcomer Juri, on whom Cammy swears revenge for her ill actions towards the "dolls", only for Juri to counter the accusation by bringing up Cammy's dark past. In her new ending, Cammy consoles a recovering former "doll" (Juni from Street Fighter Alpha 3); this new ending establishes the fact that she is recovering her memories, or at least trying to atone for the things she did in the past. In Ultra Street Fighter IV, Decapre, an early result of the Shadaloo cloning experiments that created Cammy, appears as a playable character. Cammy returned in Street Fighter V, where Cammy is able to rescue Decapre, who then join her after being freed from the brainwashing, and the other remaining Dolls during a final war against Shadaloo. However, as confirmed in Street Fighter 6, where Cammy returns to investigate the connection between Amnesia's first attack at Nayshall and the remnants of Shadaloo's whereabouts, the death of her fellow former "doll", Marz saddens her and the other surviving "dolls".

=== Other video games ===
Cammy appears in her Alpha incarnation as a playable character in crossover fighting games X-Men vs. Street Fighter, Marvel vs. Capcom 2, Capcom vs. SNK, Capcom vs. SNK 2, and Street Fighter X Tekken. She also appears as a playable character in the shoot 'em up Cannon Spike, where she appears in her SSFII costume for her default form and in her Alpha outfit as an alternate appearance (additionally wearing roller skates in both cases), in the browser-based social games Onimusha Soul, where she is re-designed to fit the feudal Japan theme, and Street Fighter Battle Combination, as well as in the mobile puzzle game Street Fighter: Puzzle Spirits, where she is a super-deformed character.

In the crossover tactical role-playing game Namco × Capcom, Cammy appears as a brainwashed enemy character who later joins the player's side as a partner to Chun-Li. Cammy has also made guest appearances in other non-Capcom games, such as Destiny Child, Gunslinger Stratos 2, Power Rangers: Legacy Wars, and Valkyrie Connect.

A redesigned Cammy appears in the beat'em up Final Fight: Streetwise as one of the underground pit fighters who challenges the player (she also has her own brand of lager, with advertising posters in the pool hall level). In the action role-playing game Monster Hunter Frontier Online, players can dress up their hunters in Cammy's Shadoloo outfit, while Breath of Fire 6 and Monster Hunter Explore have her Delta Red costume. Frank West in Dead Rising 4 can also be dressed up as Cammy. Cammy was also added to Fortnite Battle Royale, alongs with Guile on August 7, 2021.

=== Film and animation ===
Kylie Minogue portraying Cammy for Street Fighter: The Movie based on the 1994 film in which she starred

Cammy appears as one of the main heroes in the 1994 film Street Fighter. The film's Cammy is a British intelligence agent who serves as Colonel Guile's intelligence officer and aide-de-camp in the Allied Nations Army. She was portrayed by Australian pop singer Kylie Minogue, who also played Cammy in both Street Fighter: The Movie video games. Prior to her casting, the film's director, Steven E. de Souza, said they were "having trouble finding Cammy. We're seeing a lot of English girls, but they're not very thin or they're wimpy – they couldn't beat up Pee Wee Herman." After looking at hundreds of actresses in the UK, US and Australia, de Soza came upon Who magazine's "World's 30 Most Beautiful People" edition: "Kylie was on the cover. Right away I said, 'There's our Cammy.'"

Cammy appears in two Street Fighter anime productions by Group TAC. In Street Fighter II: The Animated Movie, Cammy appears in a scene early in the movie, where she assassinates British minister Albert Sellers after being brainwashed by Shadaloo. She is later seen being interrogated by Chun-Li. Her status after that is unclear, with Bison's last orders to Sagat being the elimination of Vega and Cammy. In the English dub of the film, Cammy is portrayed with an American accent, rather than a British one.

In the Street Fighter II V series, Cammy is a former special forces operative-turned-assassin who is hired by Balrog to assassinate Chun-Li's father, but is stopped by Fei Long. After her fight, she realizes that Balrog had tricked her and nearly kills him. Cammy has a completely different look in the series, wearing black leather pants a black body fit shirt, red gloves, red boots, and a black necklace with a silver cross. This incarnation of the character does not have a scar on her cheek and wears her hair in a single ponytail. As in the animated movie, the series' English dub depicts Cammy as American instead of British.

In the American Street Fighter animated series, Cammy appears in several episodes during the first season and is the central focus of a subplot in the second season. During the first season, she is an ally of Guile who has a flirtatious relationship with him, and is eventually made part of his team. However, she is brainwashed by Bison and becomes one of his underlings, fighting both Street Fighters and Delta Red during the remainder of the series. She turns on Bison when she learns that he had killed her parents, and switches sides back to her original allies, but decides not to rejoin the Street Fighters at the end of the series, preferring to sort out her life on her own.

Cammy was mentioned in Street Fighter: Resurrection episodes "Fight & Flight" and "Mission Critical". She appears in a cameo appearance in the 2012 animated film Wreck-It Ralph, alongside other Street Fighter characters.

Cammy appears in the Street Fighter film reboot portrayed by Mel Jarnson, based on her Killer Bee incarnation.

=== Other appearances ===
In addition to appearing in the manga adaptations of the Street Fighter games and anime, Cammy was the central character in Masahiko Nakahira's 1994 manga Super Street Fighter II: Cammy, which was released in English by Viz Communications. It explores the 19-year-old Cammy's background: her commando training in the UK, the years she lost to amnesia, and the encounters with M. Bison and his minions that changed her life. The plotline is not directly tied to the World Warriors tournament, instead introducing many new characters. Cammy would appear in Nakahira's subsequent 1996 manga adaptation of Street Fighter Alpha (predating her appearance in X-Men vs. Street Fighter and Street Fighter Alpha 2 Gold), where she appears as a brainwashed test subject named "Killer Bee", a codename that was later adopted for the video game storyline. The X-Men vs. Street Fighter depiction of Cammy also appeared in the 1997 manga Street Fighter: Sakura Ganbaru!, too by Nakahira. In Sakura Ganbaru! she is first named "Cammy" by Sakura by chance, the name coming from a cat in her neighborhood Cammy reminds her of.

In addition to publishing English-language adaptations of the Street Fighter Alpha and Sakura Ganbaru! manga, UDON released an original comic book series retelling the Street Fighter story. In it Cammy, working as Bison's "Killer Bee" assassin, is the one directly responsible for the death of Chun-Li's father. Elsewhere, she is tracking Ryu in San Francisco under orders from Shadaloo, when she is confronted and captured by Rose, who undoes Shadaloo's brainwashing then leaves her in front of the British embassy in Italy. Cammy has no memory of anything leading up to that moment, but a terrorist attack on the embassy suddenly triggers her latent fighting ability and she foils the threat, after which Delta Red promptly sign her on as a member. While she completes missions with Delta Red, Cammy pieces together remnants of her memory and does her best to make up for any sins she might have committed in Shadaloo's name. During the second series, Cammy takes a leave from Delta Red to find out more about her past. She travels to Mexico with Chun-Li to meet T. Hawk for a joint investigation, but they are intercepted by M. Bison, who recaptures her and demands she represent Shadaloo in the upcoming tournament he is hosting. Cammy is brought back to Shadaloo where her brainwashing is resumed during the third series (Street Fighter II Turbo), but Vega frees her from the brainwashing before the tournament finishes. Cammy acts as though she is still under Bison's command but enlists the help of Chun-Li and Guile. In the aftermath she has rejoined Delta Red.

Cammy History, a two-volume light novel by Yuka Minakawa featuring Cammy as the main character, was published by Wani Books in 1995. Cammy artwork was featured on a lenticular print NubyTech/UDON wireless joypad prototype for the PlayStation 2, which was announced on May 11, 2005, but was never released; and a Mad Catz wireless joypad for the PlayStation 3. She was also a subject of numerous figures from various manufacturers, including Funko, Kotobukiya, S.H. Figuarts, and many others. Assorted merchandise included a line of women's lingerie and a figurine that came with a DyDo drink.

== Reception ==
Cammy has become and remained one of the most popular characters in the Street Fighter franchise, starting as the most successful of the new characters from Super Street Fighter II. She won Capcom's official poll "Which character do fans most want in SFIV?" in 2008, gathering almost as many votes as all the other seven characters in the list combined. She also came second in Capcom's previous poll of 85 characters for the 15th anniversary of Street Fighter II in 2005 and won a 2008 poll put forth by Capcom asking the fans to choose which character they would like to see to return for Street Fighter IV, motivating Yoshinori Ono to implement her as fast as possible to meet the demand. In an official poll by Namco, Cammy has been the fourth-most-requested Street Fighter side character to be added to the roster of Tekken X Street Fighter, taking 15% of all votes. In 2014, users of the Japanese internet board 2channel voted her second most kawaii female Street Fighter character. In a 2018 worldwide poll by Capcom, Cammy was voted 11th-most-popular Street Fighter character. Official Sega Saturn Magazine (UK) described themselves as "big fans of Cammy" and her other fans included Jamie Lee Curtis. At ResetEra, Cammy was voted as the second-most popular Street Fighter character, behind only Chun-Li.

Cammy has been rated highly among the Street Fighter characters by many media outlets. Tips & Tricks stated about X-Men vs. Street Fighter: "If anything XSF is a great game simply because it marks the return of Cammy." IGN placed her as number nine in their 2008 list, noting her sex appeal and unique gameplay and adding "of the four new fighters in Super Turbo, she's the only one who made a return appearance in future games", while GameDaily ranked her at seventh place in their list of top Street Fighter characters for her "incredible" assassin skills and "her military motif that showcases some of the best legs in video games." In 2010, UGO Networks similarly placed her at seventh spot on their list of top Street Fighter characters, stating that while she does not have any projectile attacks, she "makes up for the lack of distance fighting with quick and close kicks." IGN Japan ranked her seventh in 2018. She was ranked as the third-best female character in Street Fighter by The Gamer's Christopher Sanfilippo, whom observed "Cammy's precise close-range combat makes her an enjoyable fighter to play. Flying into the air with her Hooligan Combination and taking a character down is such a satisfying feeling." At Den of Geek, Gavin Jasper ranked her as the eighth-best Street Fighter character, whom added "I mean, the exposed cheeks have helped keep people interested, but even then, she's able to stand alone based purely on her twisty, flippy offense and determined coldness."

Destructoid writer CJ Andriessen considers her the best character in the entire series, citing her moveset and also reasoning "...her awesome back story, great costume and the fact she was played by Kylie Minogue in the movie, Cammy is easily the best Street Fighter character..." SNK artist Falcoon stated Leona Heidern is the company's response to Cammy; both of whom are implosion assassins.

As with R. Mika, Cammy also received some censorship in Street Fighter V, which alters the angle of her entrance pose, removing her "crotch shot;" this has led to some backlash. In addition to the censorship, during a 2017 Street Fighter V tournament, ESPN did not allow players to choose her default costume, due to her thong leotard.

=== Sex appeal ===
Since her debut, Cammy has been acclaimed for her sex appeal, placing in many "hottest girls in gaming" lists. GamePro described Cammy as "one of the most risque characters ever seen in a video game!" Brazilian Ação Games opined she "comes to finish the hegemony of Chun Li" and Hyper similarly commented she "replaces Chun Li as the resident SF2 sex symbol". GamesMaster gave Super Street Fighter II the new subtitle "SSF2: Cammy Forever". Cammy was given the "Hottest Game Babe of 1993" award by Electronic Gaming Monthly. She was ranked as the fifth-sexiest character in games by Ação Games in 1997 and included among the "Miss Consoles" by German Video Games in 2000, described as superior to Chun-Li.

NBC News included Cammy on their 2012 list of the top five most preposterous video game outfits: "[W]e have one simple piece of advice: Put on some pants."
