= Street Fighter V =

2016 video game

- Box artwork for the original home console release, depicting Ryu
- Developers: Capcom; Dimps; Taito (Arcade)
- Publishers: Capcom; Taito
- Director: Takayuki Nakayama
- Producer: Koichi Sugiyama
- Artist: Toshiyuki Kamei
- Composers: Masahiro Aoki; Hideyuki Fukasawa; Keiki Kobayashi; Takatsugu Wakabayashi; Zac Zinger; Steven McNair
- Series: Street Fighter
- Engine: Unreal Engine 4
- Platforms: PlayStation 4; Windows; Arcade
- Release: PS4, Windows: WW: February 16, 2016; Arcade Edition: WW: January 16, 2018; Champion Edition: WW: February 14, 2020; Champion Edition - All Characters Pack: JP: December 9, 2021; Arcade: JP: March 14, 2019
- Genre: Fighting
- Modes: Single-player, multiplayer
- Arcade system: Taito Type X^{4}

Street Fighter V (Note: Street Fighter V (Japanese: ストリートファイターV, Hepburn: Sutorīto Faitā Faibu)) is a 2016 fighting game developed and published by Capcom for PlayStation 4 and Windows. It is the fifth main installment of the Street Fighter series. Similar to previous games in the series, Street Fighter V features a 2D fighting gameplay system, and introduces the "V-Gauge" mechanic. The game featured 16 characters at launch, with four of them being new to the series; a main story mode and 30 additional characters were added through updates and downloadable content.

Upon release, the game received mixed reviews, with critics praising the game's graphics and gameplay, but criticizing its lack of content and characters, as well as its technical issues. At launch the game initially sold lower than Capcom's expectations; however, as of June 2026, Street Fighter V has sold 8 million units, making it the best-selling Street Fighter game on home consoles, surpassing the original version of Street Fighter II. An updated version developed by Taito, Street Fighter V: Arcade Edition, was released in 2018, and was received more positively, with various improvements such as additional single-player content and the addition of Arcade Mode. A second update in 2020, titled Street Fighter V: Champion Edition, includes all fighters, stages, and most of the costumes released through its first four seasons. Street Fighter V was followed up by a sequel, Street Fighter 6, in 2023.

== Gameplay ==
Chun-Li (right) battles Ryu (left) in the Union Station stage. The game features 3D characters and backgrounds, but is played in a 2D arena.

Street Fighter V carries on the 2D fighting gameplay of its predecessors, in which two fighters use a variety of attacks and special abilities to knock out their opponent. The game features the EX gauge introduced in Street Fighter III, which builds as the player lands attacks and can be used to either power up special moves or perform super combos known as Critical Arts, although the Focus Attacks from the previous game have been removed. New to this game is the "V-Gauge", which builds as the player receives attacks and adds four new techniques: V-Skills, V-Reversals, V-Triggers, and V-Shifts. V-Skills are special attacks unique to each fighter; for example, Ryu can parry an attack while M. Bison can reflect projectiles, some of which build V-Gauge when successfully performed. V-Reversals allow players to use a section of the V-Gauge to perform a counter move while being attacked. Similarly, V-Shifts use one section of the V-Gauge to dodge and potentially counter an incoming attack. Finally, V-Triggers use the entire V-Gauge to allow the player to perform a unique ability, such as a temporary damage boost for Ryu's energy balls or added hits to Chun-Li's attacks. Additionally, the Stun Meter, which has been present since Street Fighter II, is made visible under the health bars in this game. The Stun Meter increases when receiving consecutive attacks and will cause the player to become stunned if filled; thus, it encourages players to play offensively when the opponent's Meter is close to full. The game also features an interactive arena, showcasing special animations when a player is defeated at the edge of the arena.

=== Characters ===
The game featured 16 characters at launch, four of whom were new to the Street Fighter series. Following the game's launch, several additional characters were developed and added to the game via updates, split between several "seasons" of content. These characters, among other post-launch content, are able to be purchased via either real-world currency, or "Fight Money", earned through gameplay.

Characters who are playable for the first time in a Street Fighter title are highlighted in bold.

Base Roster
Birdie; Cammy; Chun-Li; Dhalsim; **F.A.N.G.**; Karin; Ken; **Laura**; M. Bison; Nash; **Necalli**; R. Mika; **Rashid**; Ryu; Vega; Zangief
Season 1 (Note: Included in Arcade Edition.) (Note: Included in Champion Edition.)	Season 2	Season 3	Season 4	Season 5
Alex; Balrog; Guile; Ibuki; Juri; Urien	**Abigail**; Akuma; **Ed**; **Kolin**; **Menat**; **Zeku**	Blanka; Cody; **Falke**; **G**; Sagat; Sakura	E. Honda; Gill; **Kage**; **Lucia**; Poison; Seth	**Akira**; Dan; **Eleven**; **Luke**; Oro; Rose

During the game's multiple season passes, in addition to the first Street Fighter appearances of Final Fight characters Abigail and Lucia Morgan as well as Rival Schools character Akira Kazama, several new characters were also introduced to the franchise:

- **Laura Matsuda**, a Brazilian fighter and older sister to previous character Sean Matsuda who uses Brazilian jiu-jitsu and electricity in her attacks.
- **F.A.N.G.**, also known as **Fang Fei** in Street Fighter 6, a leader in series recurring villain M. Bison's Shadaloo criminal organization who combines long ranged attacks and slippery movements with his ability to poison his opponents.
- **Necalli**, an intelligent yet wild Aztec-like warrior who seeks a strong opponent's soul.
- **Rashid**, a Middle Easterner who is capable of manipulating wind and is searching for a missing female friend who has been kidnapped by Bison and Shadaloo, until he finds out at the end of this game's main story that F.A.N.G. killed her. As shown in Street Fighter 6, where he is now a streamer, Rashid's ancestors also has bad histories with the Illuminati, Gill's organization from Street Fighter III, who took over his ancestral land.
- **Kolin**, the Russian assistant to the Illuminati's leader Gill. Previously debuted as a non-playable character in Street Fighter III, she uses systema and cyrokinesis.
- **Ed**, a young man who was abducted as a child to serve as a replacement body for series antagonist M. Bison. Rescued and raised by Balrog since the end of Street Fighter IV sub-series, he utilizes boxing and Psycho power to form the group Neo Shadaloo to fight remnants of the original Shadaloo. Initially uses kickboxing in his playable debut, until he discards kick attacks for a pure boxing style as of Street Fighter 6
- **Menat**, previous character Rose's Egyptian teenage apprentice who fights by manipulating sphere projectiles. The sphere she wields, "Left Eye of Lion" has references to one of the location from Red Earth, Sangypt.
- **Zeku**, the master of Final Fight series ninja Guy, who can switch between his current old form and his younger form. First appearing as a non-playable character in Guy's ending of Street Fighter Alpha 2, he is the founder of Striders, with his younger form resembles Strider Hiryu's Strider 2 incarnation.
- **Falke**, a woman abducted as a child to serve as a potential replacement body for M. Bison. She works alongside Ed in Neo Shadaloo, who utilizes a staff to focus her Psycho power.
- **G**, the self-proclaimed "President of the World".
- **Kage**, known in full as **Kagemono Naru**, a personification of Ryu's Satsui no Hado after Ryu purges it from himself, and later destroyed by Ryu.
- **Eleven**, a prototype of Street Fighter III character Twelve, acting as a randomizer character for the roster. In the game's story it is seen as a failure, and its body is recycled to revive Charlie Nash.
- **Luke**, an American military mixed martial artist who vows to become a hero like his late father, Robert, and is a friend of both series characters Ken Masters and Guile, with the latter served as his mentor since joining a military, as well as befriending with the former's son, Mel. Luke also acted as a preview and a main figure for Street Fighter 6, where he served as primary protagonist in a manga prequel, Luke Rising.

== Plot ==
The story takes place between the events of Street Fighter III and Street Fighter IV. Years after he was killed by M. Bison, Charlie Nash awakens in a tomb and is instructed by a young woman named Helen to retrieve an item from his old friend Guile that will help him destroy Bison. Meanwhile, the Shadaloo organization initiates "Operation C.H.A.I.N.S." by launching seven artificial satellites in orbit known as the "Black Moons", planning to spread fear and despair, the source of Bison's Psycho Power, and siphon this energy in order to render him and his forces invincible. Rashid infiltrates the headquarters of Shadaloo looking for a friend who was kidnapped by them, but is discovered and defeated by F.A.N.G. F.A.N.G. steals a chess piece-like item in Rashid's possession and uses it to detonate one of the Black Moons, triggering a high altitude electromagnetic pulse above New York City.

Unsuccessfully attempting to stop Bison and his subordinates in New York, Guile and Chun-Li are attacked by Charlie, who attempts to take the pieces sent to them before fleeing. Charlie reunites with Helen, who also convinces Rashid and Juri to form an alliance with them to retrieve the pieces. She explains they are the keys to control the Black Moons, which were sent to certain individuals in order to prevent their use. In possession of the same information, Karin Kanzuki summons warriors from around the globe to help gather the pieces before Shadaloo as well. All of them answer Karin's call except Ryu, who stays behind at Ken's suggestion to train further in order to keep his Satsui no Hado at bay.

As the warriors travel the world in search for the pieces, they are repeatedly attacked by Shadaloo's minions and Dolls, as well as the ancient Aztec god Necalli, who seeks to devour the strongest fighters' souls. During a fight, Cammy defeats and restrains her sister Decapre. Knowing she was being brainwashed by Shadaloo, Cammy refuses to surrender Decapre to the police and takes her away with Juri's help. Having gathered all remaining pieces and more allies, the warriors storm Shadaloo's base and successfully deactivate the Black Moons, but fail to defeat Bison's troops and are forced to retreat. F.A.N.G. threatens Li-Fen, a young girl among those kidnapped and forced to create the Black Moons. He demands she alter their course and have them fall on Earth instead, striking six main cities around the globe in 24 hours to cause havoc and generate the Psycho Power they need.

Ryu returns from his training and defeats Necalli in combat, purging the Satsui no Hado from himself and forcing the god to permanently retreat. He rejoins his companions in a second attack on the Shadaloo base. Rashid discovers his missing friend was killed by F.A.N.G. long ago, but manages to stop the Black Moons completely using a hint his friend left for him. Charlie confronts Bison and fails to defeat him, but sacrifices himself to drain part of Bison's Psycho Power, weakening him enough for Ryu to destroy him once and for all. Chun-Li takes Li-Fen, and the warriors evacuate the Shadaloo base as it is destroyed. The brainwashed Dolls recover their senses, while Rashid receives a pre-recorded message from his now deceased friend, thanking him for helping to save the world and telling him to move on with his life. Meanwhile, Helen returns to her master, Gill, who declares he shall restore order to the world and asks Helen, revealed to be Kolin, to follow him.

In a post-credits scene, Ryu and Ken have a sparring match and, afterwards, conclude that their journeys have no end and vow to keep moving forward.

== Development and release ==
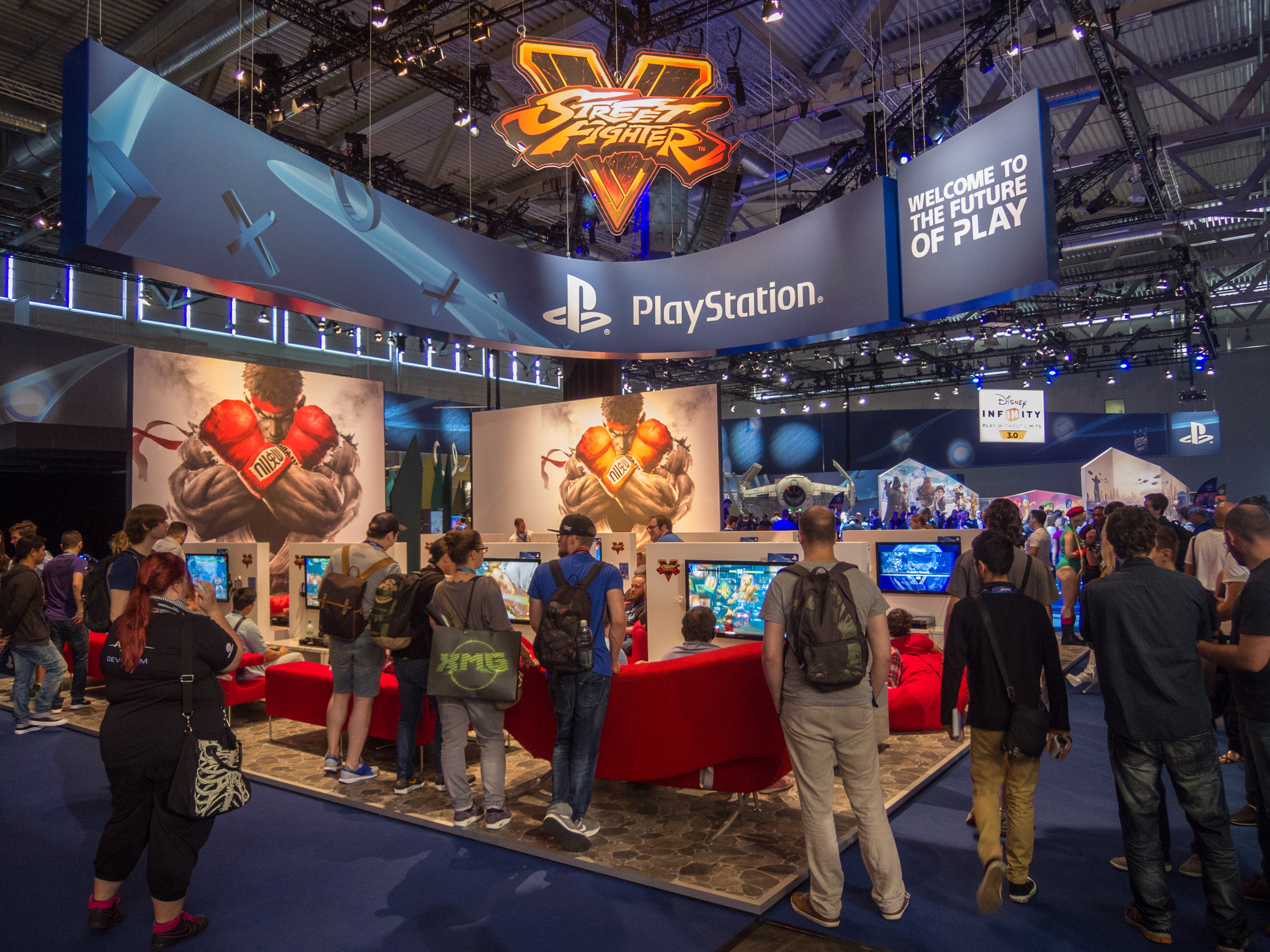
Street Fighter V / PlayStation promotion at Gamescom 2015

Street Fighter V was developed by Capcom and Dimps. The game was unofficially revealed through a YouTube video on December 5, 2014, which was promptly taken down. It was officially revealed the next day during the 2014 PlayStation Experience in Las Vegas and was announced as being developed exclusively for PlayStation 4 and Windows. The game was initially announced for Linux through use on SteamOS but didn't release despite claims of development. Valve's Steam Deck, utilizing SteamOS 3.0, can run the Windows version of Street Fighter V through Proton. The game was built using Unreal Engine 4 and features cross-platform gameplay. The image song was chosen by Capcom to be "Survivor" by Man with a Mission.

On June 12, 2015, Capcom further clarified that the game would not be released on rival consoles due to a development partnership between Sony Computer Entertainment and themselves. On the partnership, Capcom's Matt Dahlgren said "Part of the reason we partnered up with Sony is, we share the same vision for the growth potential in the fighting game space. I'd say the key aspect is working with us on executing cross platform play, this is going to be the first time we've ever united our community into a centralized player base." Starting that July the game was available to play for a limited time at various Six Flags parks around the United States. On July 23, 2015, Capcom offered a beta program for players on the PS4 in North America that preordered the game and European players that signed up on the PSN website. However, while it was expected to last for five days, the beta suffered from significant server problems and was taken offline early as a result. On August 14, 2015, the beta for the PS4 was put back online for an internal stress test. Following the stress test, the beta was put back online on August 28, 2015. Street Fighter V was released for PlayStation 4 and Windows on February 16, 2016.

According to director Takayuki Nakayama, Street Fighter V was originally planned to feature six seasons of DLC content before getting cut to five.

=== Post-release ===
In January 2016, Capcom announced a post-launch update containing a single-player cinematic story mode, titled "A Shadow Falls". The mode was made available as a free update on July 1, 2016.

One update for the PC version caused a driver with the name "Capcom.sys", a rootkit, to be installed into the system that allowed applications to run arbitrary code with kernel-level permissions. On newer processors, it disabled supervisor mode execution prevention (a processor capability that is used to prevent low privilege code like applications from running instructions with higher level privileges) and then re-enabled supervisor mode execution prevention when the application was done running kernel-level code. This was done to prevent cheating. This driver did not validate what application was trying to use it, so any malware could have used the driver to execute kernel-level code. Following the controversy Capcom recalled the rootkit update, reverting to an earlier PC version of the game while still including the new content.

In May 2016, PS4 players became aware that Street Fighter V has an 8 frames of input latency, which affects play at high levels. In June 2016, Capcom apologized for its lack of communication surrounding issues and future updates, saying "We'll be the first to admit that we can improve our communication with the community, in terms of where our priorities lie around the game and status updates."

=== Beta changes ===
During the beta stage of the game, changes were introduced to certain animations, apparently to tone down their sexual content. Namely, a camera angle in Cammy's intro was changed, which originally provided a peek at her crotch, and a shot of R. Mika slapping her butt during her critical art was modified to make the slapping happen off-screen. Reaction to the changes were mixed, many expressing distaste for what they felt was needless censorship that took away from the character's personalities, while others, specifically in the West, praised the changes, feeling the originals were too sexualized. Capcom refused to comment on specific changes, only stating that the game was still in active development, and as such, changes in general were to be expected.

=== Street Fighter V: Arcade Edition ===
On October 5, 2017, Capcom announced Street Fighter V: Arcade Edition, for release on January 16, 2018, in United States and Japan and on January 19, 2018, in Europe. The game includes codes for all of the DLC characters from seasons 1 and 2, as well as new interface graphics, two new gameplay modes (Arcade Mode and Extra Battle Mode), one additional V-Trigger per character, and a new CG opening cinematic. The game is available both as a free downloadable update for owners of the original game, and a standalone retail game sold at a reduced price. The Arcade Edition has been developed to use the NESiCAxLive system.

=== Street Fighter V: Type Arcade ===
During Tokyo Game Show 2018's Street Fighter V tournament prize ceremony event, Capcom's Yoshinori Ono announced that the game would get an actual arcade release exclusively in Japan in 2019, named Street Fighter V: Type Arcade. This version has USB ports on its sides, allowing players to use their own controllers, and features online support for players to link their Capcom Fighters Network account. This version also features time-limited events, Arcade Mode and Training Mode. In June 2020, a new game mode named Boss Rush was announced for Street Fighter V: Type Arcade, which features Extra Battle and Arcade Mode boss characters: Shadow Nash, Shin Akuma, Necalli, The Gief, The Master Ryu, Shadow Lady Chun-Li, Shin M. Bison and Gill. Clearing a certain amount of stages and bosses would reward the player with points and exclusive in-game rewards. "Boss Rush" is a timed event and would only last a few weeks. The first instance of the event lasted between June 24 and July 8, 2020.

In March 2024, it was announced that Street Fighter V: Type Arcade will end its services after April 2024 to make way for Street Fighter 6: Type Arcade.

=== Street Fighter V: Champion Edition ===
A second update to Street Fighter V, Champion Edition was released on February 14, 2020. Champion Edition makes several gameplay and balance changes, including giving every character a second V-Skill; these changes were distributed as a free update to all versions of Street Fighter V. Like Arcade Edition, Champion Edition was released at retail at a discounted price. The retail package includes every character, stage and costume released from Season 1 through Season 4, with the exception of Capcom Pro Tour content, sponsored costumes, and Fighting Chance outfits. Existing Street Fighter V players were given the option of purchasing a digital upgrade kit, which immediately unlocks all content included in the retail release.

On May 27, 2020, Capcom announced that due to the positive reception of Champion Edition, they would be releasing an additional fifth season for the game, titled "Season V", in which they would add five additional characters, along with three new stages. Capcom later confirmed in February 2021 that a bonus sixth character, Eleven, would be included with the season pass.

A physical release containing the voucher code for Champion Edition upgrade kit and all previously released DLC fighters, titled Champion Edition - All Characters Pack, was announced by Capcom during the Pro Tour 2021 Tournament. It was only released in Japan for PlayStation 4 on December 9, 2021.

=== In-game advertising ===
Starting on December 11, 2018, Capcom introduced optional in-game advertising (referred to as "Sponsored Content") to Street Fighter V: Arcade Edition. The advertisements appeared in three forms: "Ad Style" costumes that placed logos on characters, loading/versus screens, and certain stages.

Players could disable the feature in the Battle Settings menu. Those who kept it enabled received a small bonus in Fight Money from Ranked and Casual matches (subject to an upper limit). The initial advertisements primarily promoted Capcom's own content, including the Capcom Pro Tour and downloadable costumes/bundles.

The addition drew immediate criticism from journalists and players, who described the ads as intrusive and poorly implemented, particularly the logos placed on character models.

In response to the backlash, executive producer Yoshinori Ono stated that Capcom valued community feedback and would consider how to improve the feature. The initial Capcom Pro Tour advertisements were temporary and largely disappeared from the game by late December 2018 after the event concluded. Limited sponsored content returned later in a reduced form (for example, a 2019 Uniqlo collaboration that avoided placing ads on character models).

== Related media ==
=== Street Fighter: Resurrection ===
The web mini-series Street Fighter: Resurrection serves as a narrative prologue to the events of the game, with Charlie Nash being the protagonist. It aired on go90 from March 15, 2016, to April 5, 2016.

=== Street Fighter V: Pachislot Edition ===
A pachislot version of Street Fighter V was released exclusively in Japan on July 17, 2018, and is focused on the "A Shadow Falls" cinematic DLC story (which also contains some extra scenes that did not make it into the DLC itself). As of September 2018, Capcom had sold 3,300 machines to pachinko parlors.

=== Street Fighter V: Path of the Challenger ===
A pachislot sequel based on the Champion Edition of the game titled Street Fighter V: Path of the Challenger was released in Japan on May 20, 2024, and focuses on Ryu's journey. It also features the entire character roster, including all the Season 2, 3, 4 and 5 characters.

== Reception ==
Reception

Aggregate score
Aggregator	Score
Metacritic	PC: 74/100; PS4: 77/100

Review scores
Publication	Score
Destructoid	8/10
Edge	70%
Electronic Gaming Monthly	8/10
Eurogamer	70
Famitsu	35/40
Game Informer	7.25/10
GameRevolution	4/5
GameSpot	7/10
GamesRadar+	4.5/5
GamesTM	8/10
Giant Bomb	3/5
IGN	8/10
PlayStation Official Magazine – Australia	90%
PC Gamer (UK)	81%
PC PowerPlay	60%
Play	9/10
Polygon	6.5
Slant Magazine	50%

Awards
Publication	Award
The Game Awards 2016	Best Fighting Game
National Academy of Video Game Trade Reviewers	Game, Franchise Fighting
20th Annual D.I.C.E. Awards	Fighting Game of the Year

The PlayStation 4 version of Street Fighter V received generally favorable reviews from critics, as indicated by review aggregation website Metacritic, holding a score of 77/100 out of 80 reviews. Reception of the Windows version was more mixed, holds one of 74/100, from 33 reviews. The game was praised for its graphics and gameplay, but was criticized for its lack of single-player content, characters, and unstable online performance at launch. Players of the game complained of similar issues (as well as others such as a lack of controller support) with 54% of the reviews on Steam being negative. Capcom's Yoshinori Ono issued an apology to fans for the host of server issues. On May 12, Capcom CEO Kenzo Tsujimoto admitted that Street Fighter V had a "lack of content" and that it "needed more polish". In November 2016, Ono said "we all know that we didn't put out a complete product, in a way that is a learning experience"

Despite the initial launch issues, reviewers praised the game's core gameplay mechanics. GamesRadar praised the game's core fighting engine and accessibility (to newcomers), stating that it would be "...a real shame if the curious new players it has so much to offer were turned off by its limited early content", ultimately concluding that the game was "at its core, still brilliant", just that "during the early phase of its life at least – will vary greatly depending on the availability of fight-ready friends in your immediate vicinity." Similarly, IGN described the game as "An excellent fighting game that's missing too many features", explaining that "Finding the right mix of old-guard fighting game fundamentals and newer, more modern takes on the genre is no small task, but Street Fighter 5 handles that balancing act with grace", at the same time, they were disappointed that "so many key and standard features would be absent on launch day." The Daily Dot gave the game a 4.5/5 score, recognizing improved graphics and sound over its predecessor, while also noting a "lack of polish" in places, including some graphical glitches. Edge magazine also had mixed feelings on the game, stating "Mechanically, it's fantastic. Structurally, it's a mess and a missed opportunity". Metro compared the game to Splatoon as in that "the core gameplay is clearly very good but the content is relatively sparse", and as such, said that they may eventually raise their score from 8/10 to 10/10 if future content downloads are comparable to the ones Splatoon eventually had received from Nintendo. Other reviewers were harsher; Slant praised the balance, however, they said that "the game essentially gives the middle finger to a sizable portion of the audience" due to the lack of content or game modes. The Guardian refused to score the game, concluding "Street Fighter V is an unfinished catastrophe, a game delivered half-cooked, as if to meet a financial deadline rather than an artistic one. Nobody could offer a definitive judgement on the game today in good conscience. One thing, however, is certain: buying Street Fighter V today is a speculative gamble." Famitsu gave it a 35/40.

The game was initially criticized for having too many "rage-quitters", due to there being no penalty system. 75% of players quit the game after a dozen matches. On March 9, Capcom took steps to fix the issue. Ono stated that one of multiple reasons for the game's February release date was for it to be out in time for the Capcom Pro Tour.

The Shadows Falls update was not well received by Destructoid, who scored it 4/10 and summarised it as "The blemishes are raw and sore, the flaws impossible not to gawk at. This is what took another five months? It's a damned shame that only adds to the increasingly sad story of Street Fighter V". The deputy editor of Kotaku said it was "ridiculous and silly", while the Financial Post scored it 6/10, stating "everything surrounding it has been a dismal failure. The Story Mode is barely a narrative."

Some of the DLC has been attacked as too expensive. Commenting on the $10 stages and $6 costumes, Eurogamer said "It all amounts to a sense that Capcom's perhaps been a bit misguided in its DLC pricing." Professional tournament commentator David "UltraDavid" Graham said that while he loved the gameplay, the game had "the worst fighting game release in modern history," and that it needed a re-release. The addition of loot boxes in June 2018 was criticised by journalists and players alike.

=== Arcade Edition ===
Reception

Aggregate score
Aggregator	Score
Metacritic	PC: 89/100; PS4: 87/100

Review scores
Publication	Score
Electronic Gaming Monthly	9/10
Eurogamer	80%
GameSpot	9/10
IGN	9/10
New York Daily News	4/5
4Players	86%

Street Fighter V: Arcade Edition holds a Metascore of 87/100 based on 36 critics, citing generally favorable reviews. Positive reviews came from IGN, GameSpot, Hardcore Gamer, and Electronic Gaming Monthly; all of which gave the game a 9/10 citing the game as a transformation from being an unfinished product to a fully fledged experience. Each praised the addition of the content in Arcade Mode and the option to select a second V-Trigger, with some praising the addition of the Team Battle mode and having frame data in the training mode. EGM praised "the ability to bring up a 3D viewer in the Shop (in order to get a proper look at new costumes and color variants before purchasing them), combined with the option to filter certain purchasables (such as outfits) only for certain characters". Push Square was less positive, giving the game an 8/10, saying that "There's a cynical part of us that says Arcade Edition is little more than a glorified season three update, but the simple truth is that there's never been a better time to jump in". 4Players and NY Daily News both said it was the game "you always wanted".

The Arcade Edition was nominated for "Best Fighting Game" at The Game Awards 2018 and for "Fan Favorite Fighting Game" at the Gamers' Choice Awards, both losing to Dragon Ball FighterZ. Said Arcade Edition was also nominated for the Raging Bull Award for Best Fighting Game at the New York Game Awards, losing to Super Smash Bros. Ultimate. It was also nominated for "Best eSports Game" at the Famitsu Dengeki Game Awards 2019, losing to Fortnite.

=== Champion Edition ===
Reception

Aggregate score
Aggregator	Score
Metacritic	PC: 77/100; PS4: 82/100

Review scores
Publication	Score
Edge	70%
Eurogamer	80%
IGN	8/10

It was nominated for the category of Best Fighting at The Game Awards 2020, losing to Mortal Kombat 11.

== Sales ==
In May 2015, Capcom announced that the company was expecting the game to sell at least 2 million units worldwide before the end of the company's fiscal year. In Japan, Street Fighter V entered the chart at number four, with sales of 42,000 in the first week. The game reached number one in the UK PS4 physical sales chart, but was held off the top spot in the multiformat chart by Call of Duty: Black Ops III. It also reached number five in the US PlayStation Store download chart, but failed to enter the top 20 in Europe. The game was the seventh best-selling retail game in the US in February 2016 according to the NPD Group.

Arcade Edition reached number 12 in the Japanese sales charts, and number 23 in the UK physical sales charts.

Champion Edition spent 2 weeks in the Japanese sales charts, debuting at number 11, before falling to number 24 in the second week. It reached number 37 in the UK. The "Upgrade kit" season pass reached number 5 in the US DLC chart, but failed to make the chart in Europe.

By February 2020, Capcom announced that Street Fighter V had shipped a combined total of 4.1 million units across the PS4 and PC platforms (digital downloads included), surpassing the first version of Street Fighter IV. By May 2020, Capcom announced that Street Fighter V had shipped a combined total of 4.5 million units across the PS4 and PC platforms (digital downloads included), surpassing Monster Hunter 4 and making it to Capcom's top 10 best selling games of all time. As of June 2026, Street Fighter V has sold 8 million units.

In October 2026, the game was delisted from digital stores such as the PlayStation Network and Steam due to the PHP2Shell vulnerability that affected the game's servers, forcing the servers to be shut down.

== In popular culture ==
Street Fighter V was featured in a Roadblock task during the 2017 cycle of the reality television show, The Amazing Race 29, during a leg taking place in South Korea. The contestant had to learn how to play the game from the coach, and then needed to beat a professional eSports player in one round to continue to race. The professional player would play one-handed if the contestant could not win in ten rounds, and then played blindfolded after another ten rounds. The game is also prominently featured in the 11th episode of the anime Tonikawa: Over the Moon for You.

Professional wrestler Kenny Omega uses a move called the "V-Trigger", named after the mechanic in the game.

=== Tournament scene ===
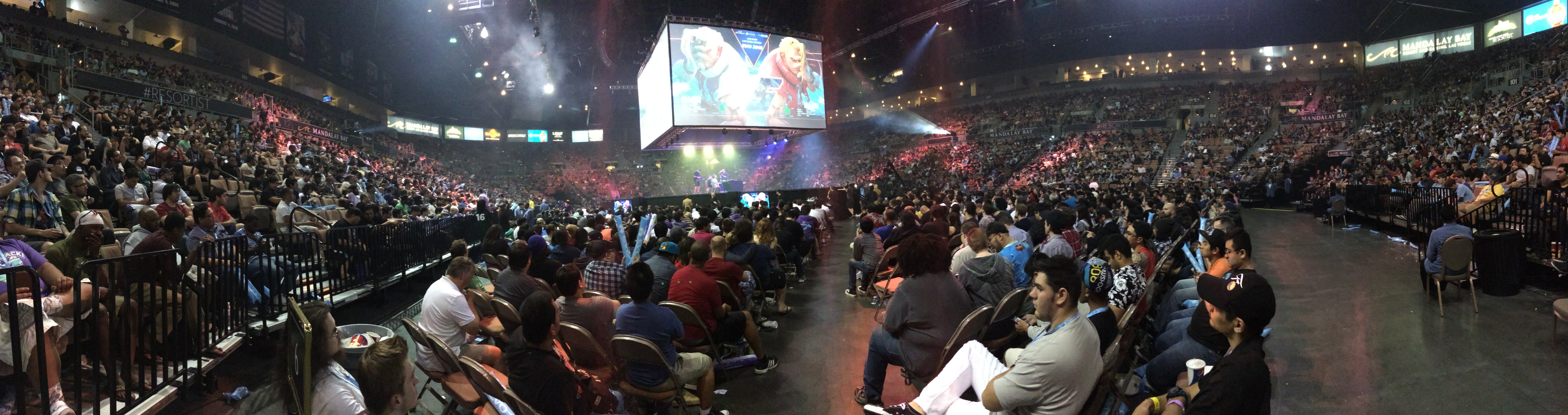
The finals of the Street Fighter V competition at EVO 2016

In 2016, Street Fighter V broke the Evolution Championship Series's record for most entrants in a single game with over 5,000 registrations.

== See also ==
- List of video games that support cross-platform play
