= Daigo Umehara =

Japanese fighting game player

Daigo
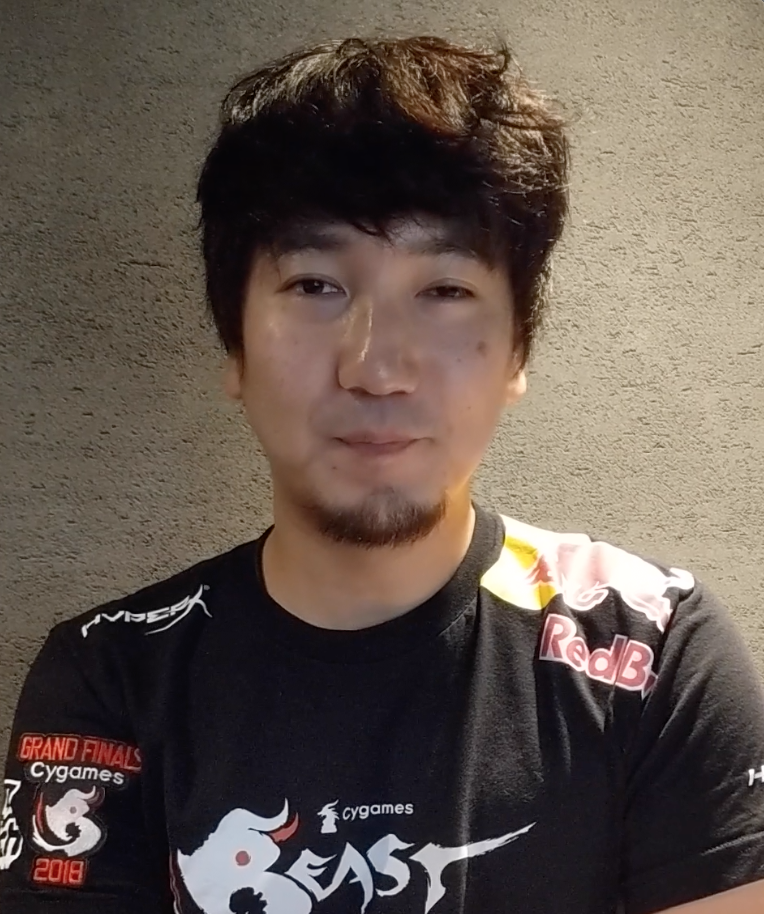
- Daigo Umehara in 2018

Personal information
- Name: Daigo Umehara
- Nickname: The Beast
- Born: 19 May 1981 (age 45); Hirosaki, Aomori, Japan
- Nationality: Japanese

Current team
- Team: REJECT
- Game: Street Fighter 6

Career information
- Games: Super Street Fighter II Turbo; Street Fighter III: 3rd Strike; Ultra Street Fighter IV; Street Fighter V; Street Fighter Alpha 3; Darkstalkers; Capcom vs. SNK 2; Guilty Gear; Capcom Fighting Evolution
- Playing career: 1997–present

Career highlights and awards
- 6× EVO champion (2003–2004, 2009–2010); 2× SBO champion (2003, 2005)

Daigo Umehara (Japanese: 梅原 大吾, Hepburn: Umehara Daigo; born 19 May 1981) is a Japanese esports player and author who competes professionally at fighting video games. He specializes in 2D arcade fighting games, mainly those released by Capcom. Known as "Daigo" or "The Beast" in the West and "Umehara" (ウメハラ; written in katakana instead of kanji) or "Ume" in Japan, Daigo is one of the world's most famous Street Fighter players and is often considered its greatest. His longevity is seen as rare in the world of competitive video games. He currently holds a world record of "the most successful player in major tournaments of Street Fighter" in the Guinness World Records and is a six time Evo Championship Series winner.

Before properly being called a pro gamer from signing a sponsorship deal with Mad Catz, Japanese media usually referred to Daigo as "the god of 2D fighting games" (2D格闘ゲームの神, 2D Kakutō Gēmu no Kami).

== Early career ==
Daigo began going to an arcade game center and playing fighting games as an elementary school student around 10 years of age. Street Fighter II and Fatal Fury: King of Fighters had recently been released and were Daigo's first two fighting games. Street Fighter II often had a very long line with older players, so he began learning Fatal Fury first. After some time and due to the limited time he could stay at the game center, Daigo started challenging other players in Street Fighter II' (Champion Edition) for an opportunity to play even though he felt shy and had to ask for permission. This was when he discovered that he preferred competing with other players.

Around the time when he was a 13-year-old middle school student, Daigo shifted his main game to Vampire Hunter because he thought he was more skilled in that game than in Street Fighter II. He developed a reputation in Vampire Hunter by setting a 286-win streak record in a single outing before he was forced to leave due to Akihabara Sega (now Club Sega) game center closing for the day. Umehara enrolled in his first tournament when he entered GAMEST Cup's national Vampire Hunter tournament in 1995, losing in the block's finals. His first tournament victory came at his second tournament, GAMEST Cup's national Vampire Savior tournament in 1997, where he defeated Ōnuki (now Nuki) in the finals.

In 1998, at the age of 17 Daigo participated in Capcom's official Street Fighter Zero 3 national tournament and advanced to the finals which took place on a stage in Tokyo Game Show 1998: Autumn on October 11. After winning the tournament by defeating Ōnuki 3–1, Daigo, as the champion, went on to face Alex Valle, the winner of the U.S. national Street Fighter Alpha 3 tournament. The international "Grand Championship" was held in San Francisco, California on November 8. This was Daigo's first trip to the U.S. and his first overseas tournament appearance. The match was best of three games, with five-round games. Daigo came from behind to win 2–1. Both events aired as a 50-minute TV report in Japan.

In September 2001, Daigo's popularity led to the publishing of a mini-autobiography called VERSUS (known as "Umehon" (ウメ本) or "Ume Book" by fans). The book's content is separated into six chapters chronicling the games in which he competes and includes background stories, anecdotes of competitions, and analysis of his opponents.

In November 2000, 4 months after the B4 Street fighter championships, the top Ranked players from the event Flew out to Shinagawa, Tokyo Japan to play in an exhibition. American players competed in four games (Super Street Fighter II Turbo, Street Fighter Alpha 3, Street Fighter III 3rd Strike and Marvel vs. Capcom 2) for the right to battle Japan's best players in those respective games. Umehara only entered the 3rd Strike exhibition, but defeated all of his opponents, ending each round with Ken's fierce Shoryuken. These events were filmed for the documentary Bang the Machine.

In 2003, Daigo won the Super Street Fighter II Turbo tournament in the first Super Battle Opera (Tougeki) and won the same game in Evolution Championship Series when he joined the event for the first time in the same year, making him the first player to win both the SBO and Evolution in the same year on the same game. Umehara also went to Evolution 2004 and Absolution 2004 on April 18 in England and won on SSFII Turbo there.

Daigo has participated regularly in a number of tournaments, appearing in at least one each year since his start in 1997, with a brief hiatus in 2008.

== Play style ==
Throughout his career, Daigo Umehara's main character has been Ryu and his play style based on zoning (keeping the opponent at a specific distance) even though he is also adept in close combat. Since Street Fighter V's balance patch in December 2016 that nerfed Ryu to balance the game, Daigo switched to Guile, a charge character. Daigo said, "I don't care if I play a top tier character. I don't need to pick a top tier character, but I want to have a character that can fight the top tiers. It's boring if you go to tournament and you know you're going to run into a really bad match up, it's like 'Oh, I can't win because of the match up'". Hesitating between Urien and Guile, he finally chose the latter, but decided to try Ryu one more time in Topanga League 6 and Final Round 20. His disappointing results (he finished respectively last and 33rd) made him give up on Ryu. Since then, he has continued to play with Guile in spite of a new balance patch that partially restored Ryu in 2017.

== Evolution 2004 ==
Despite having never matched off against him before, Umehara was known for having a supposed rivalry with the American Justin Wong due to their differences in gaming philosophies. The two players met each other in the loser's finals of Evo 2004's Street Fighter III: 3rd Strike tournament. Umehara, playing using the character Ken, was down to his last pixel of vitality and any special attack by Wong's Chun-Li, even if guarded, could knock Ken out. Wong attempted to hit his opponent with Chun-Li's "Super Art" move, forcing Umehara to parry 15 attacks in a very short period of time. Umehara did so successfully and went on to counter a final kick of Chun-Li in mid-air before launching a combo move himself and winning the match. Though Umehara lost the grand finals to Kenji Obata, the clip of him parrying Wong's multihit attack became hugely influential and has been compared to famous sports moments such as Babe Ruth's called shot and the Miracle on Ice. It was at one point the most-watched competitive gaming clip of all time. It has also been called “Most important fighting game moment of all time” by many players in the fighting game community.

== Street Fighter IV era ==
In July 2008, Umehara came out of retirement and became competitive once again. This time, his focus was on the newly released Street Fighter IV. Because of this, Japanese arcade gaming magazine Arcadia has included a DVD featuring "Umehara Concept Matches" in its January 2009 issue (released on November 29, 2008) and "The God has returned" was stated in Umehara's player introduction part. The DVD contains exhibition matches between him and Japan's 6 top players such as Inoue, Itabashi Zangief, Fuudo, Nemo, and Mago.

=== 2009 ===
On March 5, Umehara made an appearance as the "god of the fighting games world" on the TV show "Gamer's Koshien". He and four other top Japanese players (Soushihan KSK, Itabashi Zangief, Mago, and Tokido) competed with each other and with celebrities in a Street Fighter IV round-robin tournament.

On April 18, at GameStop's Street Fighter IV National Tournament 2009 in San Francisco, California, four players from three countries held exhibition matches following the main competition. Umehara, who came by Capcom's invitation, defeated players Iyo, Poongko and Justin Wong to win the tournament. For the win, he was awarded a free trip to Evolution 2009 in Las Vegas.

Umehara began writing a column in Arcadia called Umehara Column: Michi, starting with the August issue. ("Umehara Column: Street")

Thanks to his win at the GameStop tournament, Umehara entered the Evolution 2009 Street Fighter IV competition as a seeded player in the semi-finals on July 18, which was the second day of the event. In the third and final day, Umehara defeated Justin Wong and placed him in the Losers Bracket, then advanced to the grand finals only to meet Wong again. The two fought until the last game possible, but Umehara ultimately won the competition.

The September issue of Arcadia magazine included a DVD featuring a set of "Umehara's Concept Matches." This was a follow-up to a previous DVD which released in late 2008.

On August 7, Umehara participated in an all night tournament called "GODSGARDEN."

Umehara participated in exhibition matches in a Street Fighter IV competition in Taiwan on October 10. The matches were broadcast live on Famitsu's web channel.

Umehara returned to the United States to join a tournament called Season's Beatings, held October 16–18 in Columbus, Ohio. He won Super Street Fighter II Turbo HD Remix and Street Fighter IV Singles competition.

In a November interview with Simon Parkin, a 28 year old Daigo stated that he felt he was, currently, at his peak as a gamer. He went on to clarify his claim: "My reactions are probably comparable to when I was younger, but I no longer grow agitated when I'm cornered. Nothing can mentally break me anymore; I have mastered nervousness and tension. I can instantly tell opponents apart and categorize them into groups and types according to their personality and weaknesses. As I haven't felt my physical abilities weakening yet, I think I might be at the peak of my career as a fighting gamer."

On November 26, Umehara and five other top Japanese Street Fighter IV players joined a Nico Nico live internet show to talk about the second GODSGARDEN tournament. The show also featured an exhibition match between Umehara and Mago.

=== 2010 ===
Instead of participating in GODSGARDEN #2 (March 6), Umehara flew to France to enter Street Fighter IV tournaments in the World Game Cup gaming event, which took place March 3–7. He placed second in singles and first in 2-on-2.

On April 4, Umehara and two teammates participated in an official Street Fighter IV National Tournament and qualified for the top 14. His team was eliminated, in the quarter finals.

Umehara participated in Capcom's Super Street Fighter IV "Fight Club" launch party in Los Angeles, United States on April 23. Umehara held exhibition matches in which he played various characters including Hakan, Guy, and Dee Jay against a dozen challengers. The event closed with a 3-out-of-5 match between Umehara and Justin Wong, ending in a double-K.O. draw which left Umehara undefeated all night. It was also revealed at the event that Umehara had accepted a sponsorship deal with Mad Catz and would play under their name in future tournaments.

The limited edition of Super Street Fighter IV from the e-CAPCOM store included a special DVD featuring two tournaments between Japan's 8 top players: Umehara, Tokido, Iyo, Shirou, Kin Devu, Momochi, Tokidoki Nukings, and Itabashi Zangief. The Super Street Fighter IV Technical Guide published by Enterbrain which was released on April 28 includes a DVD featuring exhibition matches of the new characters played by Japan's 7 top players: Umehara, Tokido, Kin Devu, Iyo, Momochi, Itabashi Zangief, and Shirou.

On May 9, Umehara appeared on the NHK Sunday night program "MAG-NET" in a feature about Street Fighter.

On May 15, Nico Nico Live held a Super Street Fighter IV online competition where participating online players on Xbox Live got a chance to fight Japan's 3 top players: Umehara, Mago, and Tokido. They also held offline matches and a brief talking segment.

May 29–30, Umehara went to Australia for the first time to participate in Evolution Asia Pacific's Super Street Fighter IV tournament in Sydney. He won the tournament, losing just one game. As the grand prize, he earned a paid flight to Evolution 2010 in Las Vegas where he would start off as a seeded player.

On June 4, Umehara joined the 106th Xbox Live Park online event held by Microsoft Japan with Famitsu's editorial department. During the two-hour event, participating Xbox Live Gold members had the opportunity to chat and face off with Umehara in Super Street Fighter IV online matches.

After getting 2nd place in Nagoya Street Battle 15 (July 4), Umehara joined Evolution 2010 on July 9–11 and faced a tougher challenge than before with over 1,700 players from around the world participating in the Super Street Fighter IV tournament. Nevertheless, Umehara secured a win without ever dropping into the Losers bracket. The live stream of the event set a new record with an approximate 48,000 viewers at its peak across its two channels (Stickam 18,000 and Ustream 30,000).

After winning the qualifier on May 22, Umehara's team participated in the Super Battle Opera 2010 Street Fighter IV finals on September 19 and won second place. The event took place as a part of Tokyo Game Show 2010 at Makuhari Messe International Convention Complex.

Umehara participated in the Season's Beatings tournament in Ohio for the second time October 15–17, the Southern California Regionals tournament in Los Angeles November 6–7, the Canada Cup in Canada November 13–14, and the Northern California Regionals tournament November 20–21. He also attended an exhibition event in Kuwait on November 26.

=== 2012 ===
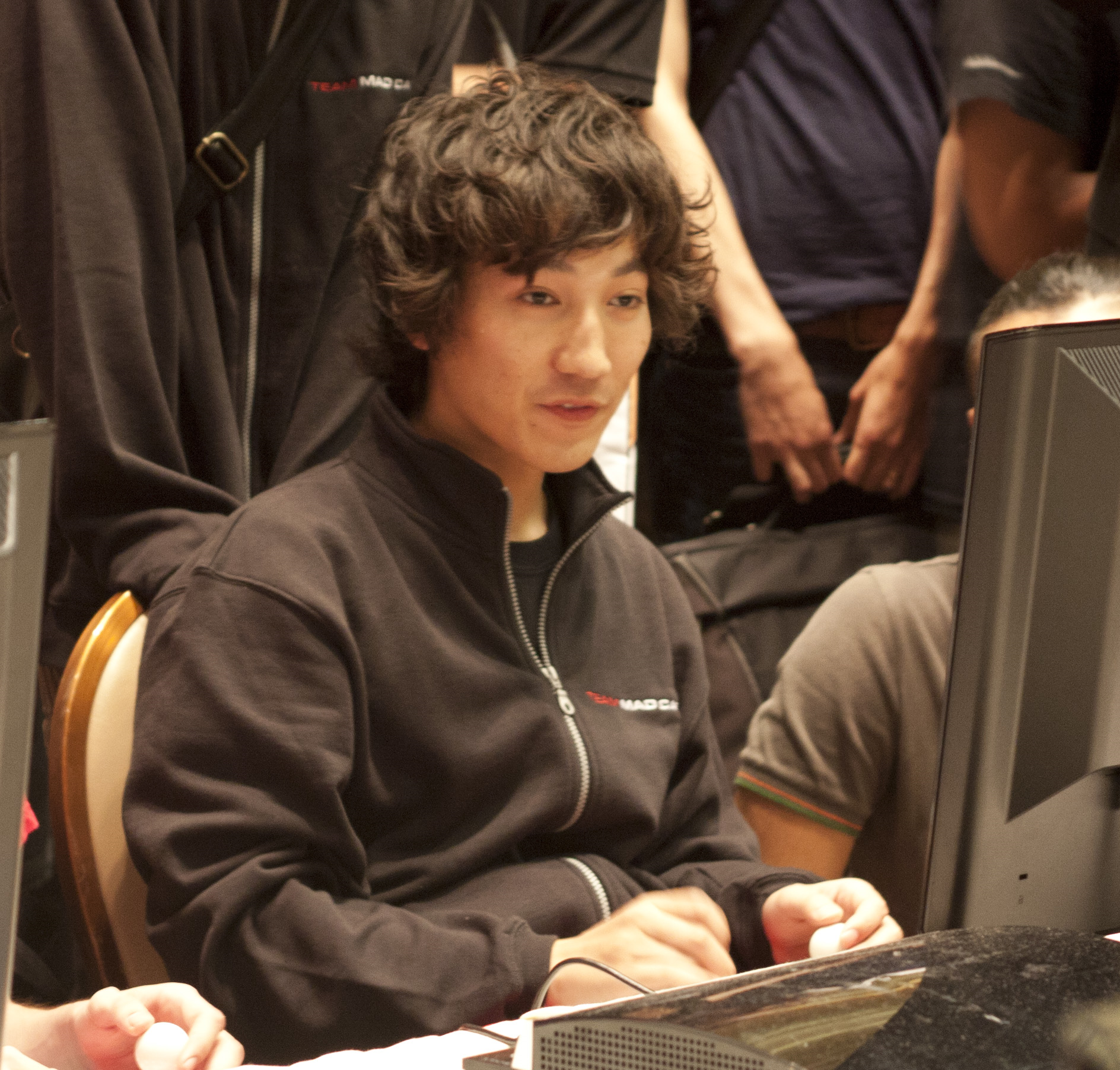
Umehara in 2011

Umehara published his first book The Will to Keep Winning (勝ち続ける意志力, Kachitsuzukeru ishiryoku) on April 2, 2012. The book reached the #1 best-selling spot on Amazon Japan's Kindle store.

=== 2013 ===
On April 13, 2013, Daigo attended the New York University Game Center's fourth annual Spring Fighter event as a special guest alongside Seth Killian. At the event, Umehara and Killian held a talk, in which Umehara discussed his life in and out of the Street Fighter scene.

On June 6, 2013, Daigo spoke at the first in a series of seminars hosted by Tohmatsu Innovation Co, Ltd. targeting business executives.

On August 30, 2013, Daigo had a match against the 2013 EVO Champion Xian. The rule was the first to win 10 matches will be declared the winner. Daigo won the match 10–0 against the world Champion Xian.

A couple of months later, in a similar match, Daigo beat Infiltration 10–2.

On November 24, 2013, Daigo held a panel at the DODA career fair where he spoke about his experiences as a professional gamer.

=== 2015 ===
During the Stunfest 2015 final, Daigo managed to pull off an impressive 25-hit combo with Evil Ryu against Ken controlled by Momochi who was the best Ultra Street Fighter IV player of the season according to the Capcom Pro Tour 2015 ranking. The combo thrilled the crowd and was acclaimed by the live French and English commentators. It was selected by Capcom as one of the «Most Hype Moments» of 2015 in a retrospective video. « You could hear the crowd go wild and if you were watching the stream you could see the stream chat go crazy » wrote Capcom in an article, while a French spectator who was in the crowd said that « Daigo's incredible 25-hit combo with Evil Ryu stunned the crowd and the opponent ». Daigo finally won the tournament beating Momochi, 3–1.

Umehara penned a foreword for the September issue of Japan's Harvard Business Review, with the title "得意なことより好きなことを追求する" ("Tokui na koto yori suki na koto wo tsuikyuu suru", "Pursue that which you like rather than that at which you excel").

In December 2015, Umehara announced his intentions to donate the entirety of his winnings from the Capcom Pro Tour 2015 Finals, a sum of $60,000, to the Evo Scholarship, a New York University scholarship program which offers financial assistance to students wishing to study game design at the NYU Game Center at the Tisch School of the Arts. The NYU Game Center confirmed the $60,000 donation on January 6, 2016.

== Street Fighter V era ==
=== 2016 ===
The January issue of the Japanese Harvard Business Review featured a twelve-page interview with Umehara entitled, "感情を制するものはゲームを制す" ("Kanjou wo seisuru mono wa game wo seisu", "He who controls his emotions controls the game.")

In February 2016, Daigo was narrowly defeated by American rapper and music producer Lupe Fiasco in a Street Fighter V exhibition match. The event, organized by former Mad Catz executive Mark Julio, was live streamed to over 75,000 viewers. Several observers noted that Daigo's timing appeared to be off, and that he did not capitalize on key strategic openings during the match. On April 26, 2016, Daigo held a talk in conjunction with Mizuho bank and medical professor Yoshiki Ishikawa in Osaka, Japan.

In May, 2016, Daigo appeared in the Street Fighter documentary, "格闘ゲームに生きる" (Kakuto geemu ni ikiru | Living the Game), broadcast on WOWOW. Later that month, the documentary was screened at the Hot Docs Film Festival in Toronto, Canada under the name "Living the Game."

On June 1, 2016, Japanese publisher Shogakukan released the book "悩みどころと逃げどころ" (Nayamidokoro to Nigedokoro), a written discussion between Umehara and the popular Japanese blogger Chikirin.

In July 2016, an official English translation of Umehara's first book, The Will to Keep Winning, was sold to Evo attendees as an event exclusive. The book continued to be sold exclusively at fighting game events across the globe throughout the remainder of 2016.

On September 14, 2016, Umehara announced that he had achieved two new World Records recognized by Guinness World Records: "Most views for a competitive fighting game match" (for his famous match against Justin Wong from Evo 2004) and "Highest all-time rank in Ultra Street Fighter IV." Umehara received official recognition for the records via a ceremony held at Tokyo Game Show.

On November 30, 2016, Umehara announced that he had entered a new sponsorship deal with gaming headset maker HyperX.

On December 1, 2016, Red Bull and director Nick McDonald released an eleven-minute documentary on Daigo Umehara entitled, "Mind of a Beast." In the piece, Umehara addressed the pressures of life as a professional gamer, and asserted a distinction between the mythical public figure "Umehara" and the flawed human being, Daigo Umehara.

=== 2017 ===
On January 19, 2017, Daigo gave a two-hour lecture entitled "1日ひとつだけ、強くなる" ("Ichinichi hitotsu dake, tsuyoku naru", "Getting Stronger Everyday") at the Keio University Marunouchi City Campus. In the lecture, Daigo discussed the ups and downs of carving out a niche as a professional gamer. He spoke to a sold-out audience.

On March 1, 2017, Umehara announced that he had entered another sponsorship with Japanese game developer Cygames, alongside fellow pro fighting gamers Darryl "Snake Eyez" Lewis and Eduardo "PR Balrog" Perez. Together, the three athletes donned the moniker "Cygames Beast," sporting T-shirts with a matching new logo. From March to May 2017, Umehara participated in the ELEAGUE Street Fighter Invitational, during which he played solely as Guile. Beginning in Group B alongside Snake Eyez and PR Balrog, Umehara pushed his way into the Playoffs, ultimately finishing 8th overall.

On May 27–28, Umehara participated in Red Bull Kumite in Paris, France. He placed 4th overall.

On June 27, Umehara appeared in the Red Bull France-produced documentary, "The Art of Street Fighting" alongside fellow pro gamers Xiao Hai, Gamerbee, Tokido, and Luffy.

On July 14–16, Umehara participated in EVO 2017. After a no-loss sweep in Round 1, he was bumped into the Losers bracket by Haitani during Round 2, and ultimately eliminated during the Semi-Finals by longtime rival Justin Wong.

On July 14, Daigo launched the "Beast" apparel brand in conjunction with apparel makers Nsurgo. The brand is represented by Daigo as well as fellow Cygames-sponsored gamers Snake Eyez and PR Balrog.

=== 2018 ===
A memorable match took place early in the year when Daigo met his longtime rival, Tokido, in a first-to-ten bout at the Kemonomichi II exhibition. Tokido, who at this point was the defending EVO champion and one of the most dominant players on the scene, was determined to prove that he could outplay Daigo in a long-set format. Although Daigo had been less active by comparison and more focused on hosting events, he was also confident about his chances. On March 10, the pair clashed in their highly anticipated matchup. Daigo ended up winning the competitive set 10–5, leaving Tokido visibly upset at his loss.

On July 22, he won the VSFighting Premier Event in Birmingham (United Kingdom).

Later on during the year in November, Daigo attended the Red Bull Kumite invitational tournament once again, this time placing 3rd behind Problem X and champion Fujimura.

In the Capcom Cup tournament for the year, Daigo finished in 25th place.

=== 2019 ===
Umehara started out his competitive year in 2019 with a disappointing finish in 33rd place at Final Round. Later that same month, he had more success at the NorCal Regionals, where he made the top 8.

At the next major tournament Daigo attended, The Mixup, he managed to battle his way through to the Grand Finals where he faced off against Victor Woodley aka Punk, who was dominating the Capcom Pro Tour. In a hard-fought match that came down to the final round, Punk narrowly defeated his opponent. Nevertheless, Daigo's performance in the year was good enough to place him at 4th overall in the CPT rankings.

Following this, Daigo continued his success with a 5th/6th place finish in the CPT Premier tournament at Community Efforts Orlando 2019, where he was eliminated by Fujimura.

On October 27, Daigo placed 7th/8th in the CPT Premier tournament at First Attack 2019, where he was eliminated by Jonathan "JB" Bautista.

Despite not winning any major tournaments, Daigo's consistent appearance at international CPT events throughout the year was enough to earn him a qualification spot at the 2019 Capcom Cup finals. There, Daigo was eliminated by Tokido with a score of 3–2 in the second round of the tournament, leaving him with a tied 17th–24th place finish to end the 2019 competitive Street Fighter V season.

Daigo participated in another Red Bull Kumite in December, which was being held in Nagoya, Japan. With a tough tournament pool featuring Tokido, Problem X, Punk, and numerous other strong players, Daigo only managed a 13th place finish, tied with Bonchan, Gachikun, and Haku.

=== Books ===
Title	Romanization	Publisher	Release date
ウメハラコラム 拳の巻 -闘神がキミに授ける対戦格闘ゲーム術	Umehara Column Kobushi no kan – Toushin ga kimi ni sazukeru taisen kakutou game jutsu	Enterbrain	2/25/2013
ウメハラ To live is to game	Umehara To live is to game	PHP Kenkyuujo	9/11/2013
勝負論 ウメハラの流儀	Shouburon Umehara no Ryuugi	Shogakukan	10/1/2013
1日ひとつだけ、強くなる。	Ichinichi hitotsu dake, tsuyoku naru	Kadokawa	7/10/2015
勝ち続ける意志力: 世界一プロ・ゲーマーの「仕事術」	Kachitsuzukeru ishiryoku: Sekaiichi pro gamer no shigotojutsu ("The Will to Keep Winning")	Shogakukan	JPN: 4/2/2012 ENG: 7/16/2016

== Manga ==
"Umehara FIGHTING GAMERS!" is a dramatized manga depiction of Umehara's life as a young participant in the Street Fighter arcade scene, and features several noted players from the Japanese fighting game community. The series is considered a flagship title for its publisher, Kadokawa Shoten, who are actively marketing the series and have confirmed plans to serialize it in their seinen comic magazine Young Ace UP.

The series is illustrated by Kengoro Nishide and written by Saitaru Orika and Maki Tomoi, with Daigo acting as an editorial supervisor.

Volume	Release date	ISBN
1	12/26/2014	978-4041020296
2	6/26/2015	978-4041031285
3	11/26/2015	978-4041031292
4	4/26/2016	978-4041042847
5	9/26/2016	978-4041042854
6	1/25/2017	978-4041050491

On July 14, 2017, the English translation of Daigo's manga series, titled Daigo the Beast: Umehara Fighting Gamers, debuted with the release of Volume 1 (which compiles the first and second volumes of the Japanese series). The volume, published and translated by Udon Entertainment, was released as an early exclusive for EVO attendees, and is planned for a wider release in December 2017.

== Achievements ==
Year	Tournament	Game	Character	Place	Eliminated by	Video	Note
2022	Evo 2022	Street Fighter V Arcade Edition	Guile	5th	iDom (Laura) 3–2		
2022	FAV CUP 2022	Street Fighter V Arcade Edition	Guile / Luke	1st	Winner vs Pugera		
2021	CPT 2021 Online Event: Japan 3	Street Fighter V Arcade Edition	Guile	1st	Winner vs Kawano		
2021	CPT 2021 Online Event: Japan 1	Street Fighter V Arcade Edition	Guile	7 – 8th	Itabashi (Zangief) 2:3		
2020	(Japan) CPT 2020 Online Asia East #1	Street Fighter V Arcade Edition	Guile	1st	Winner vs Fuudo		
2020	Blink All Stars Japan Edition	Street Fighter V Arcade Edition	Guile	1st	Winner vs Ryusei (Urien) : 3–1		
2020	Topanga Championship	Street Fighter V Arcade Edition	Guile	4th	3/2 Round Robin		
DAIGO'S SEASON 2018 CAPCOM PRO TOUR OFFICIAL RANKING : 10th (as of December 16) (1st Tokido (Japan) , 2nd Fujimura (Japan) , 3rd Problem X (United Kingdom) )							
2018	(United States) Capcom Cup 2018	Street Fighter V Arcade Edition	Guile	25th	NL (Cammy) : 0–3	Official Capcom YouTube Video	
2018	(France) Red Bull Kumite 2018	Street Fighter V Arcade Edition	Guile	3rd	Problem X (Bison) : 1–3	Official Capcom YouTube Video	
2018	Canada Cup 2018	Street Fighter V Arcade Edition	Guile	13th	Punk (Karin) : 1–2		
2018	(Singapore) SEA Major 2018	Street Fighter V Arcade Edition	Guile	4th	Tokido (Akuma) : 2–3	Official Capcom YouTube Video	
2018	(Japan) Tokyo Game Show 2018	Street Fighter V Arcade Edition	Guile	25th	Verloren (Cammy) : 0–2		
2018	(United States) SoCal Regionals 2018	Street Fighter V Arcade Edition	Guile	25th	Serpentaurus (Zeku) : 0–2		
2018	Hong Kong Esports Festival 2018	Street Fighter V Arcade Edition	Guile	17th	Anman (Urien) : 1–2		
2018	(Taiwan) TWFighter Major 2018	Street Fighter V Arcade Edition	Guile	13th	Xian (Ibuki) : 0–2	Official Capcom YouTube Video	
2018	(United States) Evo 2018	Street Fighter V Arcade Edition	Guile	13th	CABA (Guile) : 1–2	Official Capcom YouTube Video (The video title is wrong, it's not the semi-final)	
2018	(United Kingdom) VSFighting 2018	Street Fighter V Arcade Edition	Guile	Winner vs Fujimura (Ibuki) : 3–2		Official Capcom YouTube Video	
2018	(United States) Community Effort Orlando 2018	Street Fighter V Arcade Edition	Guile	9th	Verloren (Cammy) : 0–2	Official Capcom YouTube Video	
2018	(United States) ELEAGUE 2018	Street Fighter V Arcade Edition	Guile	3rd	Smug (Balrog) : 2–3		
2018	(United States) Combo Breaker 2018	Street Fighter V Arcade Edition	Guile	33rd	Phenom (Necalli)		
2018	(France) Stunfest 2018	Street Fighter V Arcade Edition	Guile	4th	Fujimura (Ibuki) : 0–3	Official Capcom YouTube Video	
2018	(United States) NorCal Regionals 2018	Street Fighter V Arcade Edition	Guile	2nd	Tokido (Akuma) : 1–3	Official Capcom YouTube Video	
2018	(United States) Final Round 2018	Street Fighter V Arcade Edition	Guile	33rd	Fujimura (Ibuki)		
2018	Evo Japan 2018	Street Fighter V Arcade Edition	Guile	3rd	Infiltration (Menat) : 0–3		
DAIGO'S SEASON 2017 CAPCOM PRO TOUR OFFICIAL RANKING : 17th (1st Punk (United States) , 2nd Tokido (Japan) , 3rd NuckleDu (United States) )							
2017	(United States) Capcom Cup 2017	Street Fighter V Arcade Edition	Guile	7th	Moke (Rashid) : 1–3	Official Capcom YouTube Video	
2017	(Japan) Topanga Charity Cup 7	Street Fighter V Arcade Edition (5-on-5)	Daigo (Guile), Orikasa (Akuma), Machaboo (Necalli), Moke (Rashid), Nemo (Urien)	3rd	Mago (Karin), DBKoopa (Ken), Sako (Akuma), Gachikun (Rashid), Mochi (Dhalsim)		
2017	Canada Cup 2017	Street Fighter V Arcade Edition	Guile	25th	LPN (Bison) : 1–2		
2017	(Taiwan) TWFighter Major 2017	Street Fighter V Arcade Edition	Guile	9th	Kichipa-Mu (Zangief) : 0–2	Official Capcom YouTube Video	
2017	Hong Kong Esports Festival 2017	Street Fighter V	Guile	Winner vs Gachikun (Rashid) : 3–0		Official Capcom YouTube Video	
2017	Japan Cup 2017	Street Fighter V	Guile	33rd	Nemo (Urien) : 1–2	Official Capcom YouTube Video	
2017	(Germany) Fight Club NRW 8	Street Fighter V	Guile	Winner vs Jiewa (Akuma) : 3–2			
2017	(Indonesia) Abuget Cup 2017	Street Fighter V	Guile	Winner vs Go1 (Chun-Li, Ibuki) : 3–2			
2017	(United States) Evo 2017	Street Fighter V	Guile	17th	Justin Wong (Karin) : 1–2	Official Capcom YouTube Video	
2017	(Thailand) Thaiger Uppercut (TGU 2017)	Street Fighter V	Guile	5th	Dogura (Urien) : 1–3		
2017	(United States) Community Effort Orlando 2017	Street Fighter V	Guile	33rd	Mo-Joe (Mika) : 1–2		
2017	(France) Red Bull Kumite 2017	Street Fighter V	Guile	4th	Infexious (Necalli) : 1–3	Official Red Bull Kumite YouTube Video	
2017	(United States) ELEAGUE 2017	Street Fighter V	Guile	7th	Momochi (Ken) : 1–3		
2017	(Australia) Battle Arena Melbourne 9	Street Fighter V	Guile	17th	Marn (Ibuki) : 1–2		
2017	(United States) DreamHack Austin 2017	Street Fighter V	Guile	13th	Punk (Karin) : 0–2	Official Capcom YouTube Video	
2017	(United States) NorCal Regionals 2017	Street Fighter V	Guile	17th	Yukadon (Ibuki) : 0–2	Official Capcom YouTube Video	
2017	(United States) Final Round 20	Street Fighter V	Ryu	33rd	Punk (Karin) : 0–2		
2017	(Japan) Topanga League 6	Street Fighter V	Ryu	7th (0–6 Win Loss, −14 Game Diff.)			
DAIGO'S SEASON 2016 CAPCOM PRO TOUR OFFICIAL RANKING : 9th (1st Infiltration (Korea) , 2nd Tokido (Japan) , 3rd Justin Wong (United States) )							
2016	(United States) Capcom Cup 2016	Street Fighter V	Ryu	13th	Fuudo (Mika) : 0–3	Official Capcom YouTube Video	
2016	(United States) Red Bull Battle Grounds 2016	Street Fighter V	Ryu	7th	Vagabond (Necalli) : 2–3	Official Capcom YouTube Video	
2016	Canada Cup 2016	Street Fighter V	Ryu	7th	Phenom (Necalli) : 0–3	Official Capcom YouTube Video	
2016	(Italy) Capcom Pro Tour Europe Regional Finals 2016	Street Fighter V	Ryu	Winner vs Phenom (Necalli) : 3–1		Official Capcom YouTube Video (the video title is wrong, it's the Grand Final, not the Winners' Final)	
2016	(United Kingdom) EGX 2016	Street Fighter V	Ryu	4th	Onuki (Chun-Li) : 2–3	Official Capcom YouTube Video	
2016	(Portugal) Lockdown 2016	Street Fighter V	Ryu	Winner vs Ryan Hart (Ken) : 3–2			
2016	(United States) East Coast Throwdown 2016	Street Fighter V	Ryu	9th	RayRay (Chun-Li) : 1–2	Official Team Spooky YouTube Video	
2016	(Australia) OzHadou Nationals 14	Street Fighter V	Ryu	Winner vs GamerBee (Necalli) : 3–2		Official OzHadou YouTube Video	
2016	Hong Kong Esports Festival 2016	Street Fighter V	Ryu	Winner vs Eita (Ken) : 3–1			
2016	(Japan) Well Played Cup 2016	Street Fighter V	Ryu	2nd	Mago (Karin) : 2–3		
2016	(Japan) Topanga Charity Cup 6	Street Fighter V (5-on-5)	Daigo (Ryu), Sako (Juri), Jyobin (Ryu), Aaru (Vega), Santarou (Guile)	9th	GO1 (Chun-Li), Eita (Ken), Dogura (Necalli), Xian (F.A.N.G.), Esuta (Guile) : 0–5		
2016	(United States) Evo 2016	Street Fighter V	Ryu	33rd	Justin Wong (Karin) : 1–2	Official Capcom YouTube Video	
2016	(United States) Community Effort Orlando 2016	Street Fighter V	Ryu	5th	Tokido (Ryu) : 2–3	Official Capcom YouTube Video	
2016	(Sweden) DreamHack Summer 2016	Street Fighter V	Ryu	5th	Haitani (Necalli) : 0–3	Official Capcom YouTube Video	
2016	(Taiwan) TWFighter Major 2016	Street Fighter V	Ryu	13th	Tokido (Ryu) : 0–2	Official Team Spooky YouTube Video	
2016	(Japan) Tokyo Button Mashers 2016	Street Fighter V	Ryu	3rd	Nemo (Vega) : 2–3		
2016	(France) Stunfest 2016	Street Fighter V	Ryu	7th	Haitani (Necalli) : 0–3	–	
2016	(France) Red Bull Kumite 2016	Street Fighter V	Ryu	9th	GamerBee (Necalli) : 0–2	Official Red Bull eSsports YouTube Video	
DAIGO'S SEASON 2015 CAPCOM PRO TOUR OFFICIAL RANKING : 10th (1st Momochi (Japan) , 2nd Infiltration (Korea) , 3rd Bonchan (Japan) )							
2015	(United States) Capcom Cup 2015	Ultra Street Fighter IV	Evil Ryu	2nd	Kazunoko (Yun) : 2–3	Official Capcom YouTube Video	
2015	(Japan) Topanga League 5A	Ultra Street Fighter IV	Evil Ryu	Winner (3–2 Win Loss, +6 Game Diff.)			
2015	(Japan) Tokyo Game Show 2015	Ultra Street Fighter IV	Evil Ryu	33rd	Fuudo (Fei Long) : 0–2		
2015	(United States) Evo 2015	Ultra Street Fighter IV	Evil Ryu	9th	GamerBee (Elena) : 1–2		
2015	(Japan) Topanga Charity Cup 5	Ultra Street Fighter IV (5-on-5)	Oshina (Adon), Misse (Makoto), Bonchan (Sagat), Daigo (Evil Ryu); Mago (Yang)	2nd	Jyobin (Evil Ryu); Nyanshi (Sagat); Kazunoko (Yun); Nemo (Rolento); Momochi (Ken)		
2015	(Japan) Ouka Ranbu Cup 2015	Ultra Street Fighter IV	Evil Ryu	Winner			
2015	(United States) Community Effort Orlando 2015	Ultra Street Fighter IV	Evil Ryu	17th	Xiao Hai (Evil Ryu) : 1–2		
2015	(Thailand) SEA Major 2015	Ultra Street Fighter IV	Evil Ryu	5th	Tokido (Akuma) : 0–3	Official Capcom YouTube Video	
2015	(France) Stunfest 2015	Ultra Street Fighter IV	Evil Ryu, Ryu	Winner vs Momochi (Ken) : 3–1		–	
2015	(Japan) Topanga World League 2	Ultra Street Fighter IV	Evil Ryu	Winner (6–2 Win Loss, +13 Game Diff.)			
2015	(United States) NorCal Regionals 2015	Ultra Street Fighter IV	Evil Ryu	Winner vs GamerBee (Adon) : 3–0		Official Capcom YouTube Video	
2015	(France) Red Bull Kumite 2015	Ultra Street Fighter IV	Evil Ryu	5th	Infiltration (Decapre) : 0–2	Official Capcom YouTube Video	
2015	(United States) Final Round 18	Ultra Street Fighter IV	Evil Ryu	13th	Kazunoko (Yun) : 0–2		
2015	(United States) South by Southwest Fighters Invitational 2015	Ultra Street Fighter IV	Evil Ryu	5th	Tokido (Akuma) : 1–2		
2015	Canada Cup Masters Series 2015	Ultra Street Fighter IV	Evil Ryu	Winner (6–1 Win Loss, +14 Game Diff.)			
DAIGO'S SEASON 2014 CAPCOM PRO TOUR OFFICIAL RANKING : 11th (1st Luffy (France) , 2nd Bonchan (Japan) , 3rd Xian (Singapore) )							
2014	(United States) Capcom Cup 2014	Ultra Street Fighter IV	Evil Ryu	9th	PR Balrog (Balrog) : 1–2	Official Capcom YouTube Video	
2014	(Japan) Topanga League 4A	Ultra Street Fighter IV	Evil Ryu	Winner (5–0 Win Loss, +22 Game Diff.)			
2014	(Singapore) Capcom Pro Tour Asia Finals 2014	Ultra Street Fighter IV	Evil Ryu	Winner vs Xian (Gen) : 7–2		Official Capcom YouTube Video	
2014	(Japan) Taito Arcade Nationals 2014	Ultra Street Fighter IV	Evil Ryu	9th	Furikuri 2 (Rufus) : 1–2		
2014	(Japan) Taito Arcade Nationals 2014	Ultra Street Fighter IV (3-on-3)	Mago (Yang), Tokido (Akuma), Daigo (Evil Ryu)	2nd	Tare-Zou (Adon), Scoa (Viper), Dath (Fei Long) : 0–3	Official Capcom YouTube Video	
2014	Capcom Pro Tour Qualifier Taiwan 2014	Ultra Street Fighter IV	Evil Ryu	Winner vs GamerBee (Adon) : 3–0			
2014	(United States) Evo 2014	Ultra Street Fighter IV	Evil Ryu	49th	John Choi (Ryu) : 0–2		
2014	(Japan) Topanga Charity Cup 4	Ultra Street Fighter IV (5-on-5)	Nyanshi (Sagat), Daigo (Evil Ryu), Mago (Fei Long), Misse (Makoto), Nemo (Rolento)	4th	Gen@CT (Adon), Yano (Rolento), PE (Gen), Root (Adon), Shinchan (Elena) : 4–5		
2014	(Japan) Topanga World League 2014	Super Street Fighter IV: Arcade Edition v2012	Ryu	Winner (6–1 Win Loss, +21 Game Diff.)			
2014	(Japan) Super Street Fighter IV CR Edition Commemoration Event	Super Street Fighter IV: Arcade Edition v2012	Ryu	2nd	Tokido (Akuma) : 2–5		
2013	(Sweden) DreamHack Winter 2013	Super Street Fighter IV: Arcade Edition v2012	Ryu	Winner vs GamerBee (Adon) : 3–1			
2013	(Japan) Topanga League 3A	Super Street Fighter IV: Arcade Edition v2012	Ryu	5th (2–3 Win Loss, 0 Game Diff.)			
2013	(United States) Evo 2013	Super Street Fighter IV: Arcade Edition v2012	Ryu	7th	Infiltration (Akuma) : 1–3	Official Team Spooky YouTube Video	
2013	(Japan) Topanga Charity Cup 3	Super Street Fighter IV: Arcade Edition v2012 (5-on-5)	Jyobin (Ryu), Nyanshi (Sagat), Mago (Fei Long), Daigo (Ryu), Tokido (Akuma)	2nd	Koichi (Sakura), Darui (Dhalsim), Kyoku (Yang), Machaboo (Fei Long), Maikeru-tan (Ken) : 3–5		
2013	(Japan) Topanga Asia League 2013	Super Street Fighter IV: Arcade Edition v2012	Ryu	2nd (5–2 Win Loss, +5 Game Diff.)			
2012	(United States) Street Fighter 25th Anniversary Global Tournament	Super Street Fighter IV: Arcade Edition v2012	Ryu	2nd	Infiltration (Akuma) : 0–3	Official Street Fighter YouTube Video	
2012	(Japan) Street Fighter 25th Anniversary Official National Tournament	Super Street Fighter IV: Arcade Edition v2012	Ryu	Winner vs Fuudo (Fei Long) : 3–0			
2012	(Japan) Topanga League 2A	Super Street Fighter IV: Arcade Edition v2012	Ryu	2nd (3–2 Win Loss, +2 Game Diff.)			
2012	(United States) Evo 2012	Super Street Fighter IV: Arcade Edition v2012	Ryu	5th	Xiao Hai (Cammy) : 0–2		
2012	(United States) Community Effort Orlando 2012	Super Street Fighter IV: Arcade Edition v2012	Ryu	7th	Ricki Ortiz (Rufus) : 1–2	Official TeamSppoky YouTube Video	
2012	(United States) Community Effort Orlando 2012	Super Street Fighter IV: Arcade Edition v2012 (3-on-3)	GamerBee (Adon), Daigo (Ryu), Mago (Fei Long)	3rd	Combofiend (Oni), Filipino Champ (Dhalsim), Mike Ross (Honda) : 2–3		
2012	(United States) Community Effort Orlando 2012	Super Street Fighter II Turbo	Ryu	Winner vs James Chen (Cammy)			
2012	(Singapore) SEA Major 2012	Super Street Fighter IV: Arcade Edition v2012	Ryu, Guile, Yun	2nd	Xian (Gen) : 5–7		
2012	(Japan) Topanga Charity Cup 2	Super Street Fighter IV: Arcade Edition v2012 (5-on-5)	Mago (Fei Long), Bonchan (Sagat), Fuudo (Fei Long), Daigo (Ryu), Tokido (Akuma)	4th	Tonpy (Viper), Kiharu Boy (Sagat), AOI (Sagat), Gasshuku (Viper), KOICHINKO (Sakura) : 4–5		
2012	(South Korea) LG Cup 2012	Super Street Fighter IV: Arcade Edition	Ryu	2nd	Poongko (Seth) : 0–3		
2011	(Japan) Nagoya Street Battle X MadCatz	Super Street Fighter IV: Arcade Edition (3-on-3)	Daigo, Tokido, Mago	Winner			
2011	(Japan) Nagoya Street Battle 30	Super Street Fighter IV: Arcade Edition (3-on-3)	Tokido (Akuma), Daigo (Yun), Mago (Fei Long)	Winner vs Piyoppia (Sagat), Adoribu Ouji (Fei Long), Chiba (Makoto) : 3–0			
2011	(Japan) Super Battle Opera 2011	Super Street Fighter IV: Arcade Edition (2-on-2)	Daigo (Yun), Iyo (Ibuki)	3rd	Nemo (Yang), Kyabetsu (Viper) : 0–2		
2011	(Japan) GodsGarden #4	Super Street Fighter IV: Arcade Edition	Yun	9th			
2011	(United States) Evo 2011	Super Street Fighter IV: Arcade Edition	Yun	4th	Latif (Viper) : 1–2		
2011	(United States) NorCal Regionals 9	Super Street Fighter IV: Arcade Edition	Yun	Winner vs Infiltration (Akuma) : 3–1			
2011	(United States) ReveLAtions 2011	Super Street Fighter IV: Arcade Edition	Yun	Winner vs Mago (Fei Long) : 3–1			
2011	(Japan) Topanga Charity Cup 1	Super Street Fighter IV: Arcade Edition (5-on-5)	Tokido (Akuma), Mago (Fei Long), Nyanshi (Sagat), Bonchan (Sagat), Daigo (Yun)	Winner vs Yoshio (Guile), Ikari Oyaji (Yang), Shirou (Makoto), Hanamaruki (Sagat), Shungoku Neurosis (Bison) : 5–4			
2010	(United States) NorCal Regionals 8	Super Street Fighter IV	Ryu	4th	Ricki Ortiz (Rufus) : 0–2		
2010	(United States) NorCal Regionals 8	Super Street Fighter IV (3-on-3)	fLoE (Fei Long), Ricki Ortiz (Rufus), Daigo (Ryu)	Winner vs Alex Valle (Ryu), Mike Ross (Honda), Marn (Dudley) : 3–2			
2010	(United States) NorCal Regionals 8	Super Street Fighter II Turbo HD Remix	Guile, Ryu	Winner vs Alex Valle (Sagat, Ryu) : 3–0			
2010	Canada Cup 2010	Super Street Fighter IV	Guile, Ryu	Winner vs Mago (Balrog, Fei Long) : 3–0			
2010	Canada Cup 2010	Super Street Fighter IV (3-on-3)	Air (Ryu), Mago (Sagat), Daigo (Guile)	3rd	Killacam (Cammy), Jozhear (Vega), JSMaster (Balrog) : 2–3		
2010	(United States) SoCal Regionals 2010	Super Street Fighter IV	Ryu	2nd	Filipino Champ (Dhalsim) : 2–3		
2010	(United States) SoCal Regionals 2010	Super Street Fighter II Turbo HD Remix	Guile, Sagat	Winner vs Alex Valle (Ryu) : 3–0			
2010	(United States) Season's Beatings V Redemption	Super Street Fighter IV	Ryu	25th	Marn (Dudley) : 1–2	Official Season's Beating YouTube Video	
2010	(United States) Season's Beatings V Redemption	Super Street Fighter II Turbo	Ryu, Balrog, Bison	Winner vs Roy Bissel (O.Sagat) : 5–1			
2010	(Japan) Nagoya Street Battle 17	Super Street Fighter IV (3-on-3)	Machi (Guile/Akuma), Momochi (Ken/Guile), Daigo (Ryu/Guile)	Winner vs Uryo (Viper), Staygold (Ryu), Kuma (Bison) : 3–0			
2010	(Japan) Super Battle Opera 2010	Street Fighter IV (3-on-3)	Daigo (Ryu), TKD (El Fuerte), Bonchan (Sagat)	2nd	Kindevu (Rufus), Momochi (Akuma), RF (Sagat)		
2010	(England) Super VS Battle 20-X	Super Street Fighter IV	Ryu, Cammy	3rd	Ryan Hart (Ryu) : 0–2		
2010	(United States) Evo 2010	Super Street Fighter IV	Ryu	Winner vs Ricki Ortiz (Rufus) : 3–1		Official Evo YouTube Video	
2010	(United States) Evo 2010	Super Street Fighter II Turbo HD Remix	Ryu, Balrog	3rd	Snake Eyez (Zangief) : 1–2		
2010	(Japan) Nagoya Street Battle 15	Super Street Fighter IV (3 on 3)	Tokido (Akuma), Mago (Fei Long), Daigo (Ryu)	2nd	Jojo (Bison), Eita (Akuma), Y24 (Chun-Li) : 2–3		
2010	(Australia) Evo Asia-Pacific 2010 (APAC)	Super Street Fighter IV	Ryu	Winner vs Humanbomb (Chun-Li, Ryu) : 2–0			
2010	(France) World Game Cup 2010	Street Fighter IV	Ryu	2nd	Fuudo (Akuma) : 2–3		
2010	(France) World Game Cup 2010	Street Fighter IV (2-on-2)	Daigo (Ryu); Eita (Akuma)	Winner vs Yamazaki93 (Ryu); LordDVD (Honda)			
2009	(United States) Season's Beatings IV	Street Fighter IV	Ryu	Winner vs Justin Wong (Fei Long) : 4–1			
2009	(United States) Season's Beatings IV	Street Fighter IV (3-on-3)	Daigo (Ryu), Larry (Zangief), Moses (Rufus)	3rd	Santhrax (Cammy), fLoE (Sagat), Vegita-X (Zangief)		
2009	(United States) Season's Beatings IV	Street Fighter III: 3rd Strike	Ken	4th			
2009	(United States) Season's Beatings IV	Super Street Fighter II Turbo HD Remix	Ryu	Winner vs DGV (Ryu)			
2009	(Japan) GODSGARDEN #1	Street Fighter IV	Ryu	3rd	Mago (Sagat) : 0–2	Official Godsgarden YouTube Video	
2009	(United States) Evo 2009	Street Fighter IV	Ryu	Winner vs Justin Wong (Balrog) : 3–2			
2007	(Japan) 2nd Darkstalker Combination Cup	Vampire Hunter		Winner			
2007	(Japan) X-Mania 7	Super Street Fighter II Turbo (3-on-3)	Daigo (Ryu), Yaya, Aniken	2nd			
2006	(United States) Evo 2006	Street Fighter III: 3rd Strike	Ken	<7th	Alex Valle (Ken) : 1-2		
2006	(United States) Evo 2006	Hyper Street Fighter II	ST-Ryu	5th	Alex Valle (CE-Sagat) : 0–2		
2006	(United States) Evo 2006	Capcom vs. SNK 2	A-Blanka/Vega/Bison	5th			
2006	(United States) Evo 2006	Guilty Gear XX Slash (3-on-3)	Daigo (Sol Badguy), RF (Faust), Kindevu (Eddie)	2nd	Ruu (Bridget), Mint (Testament), BAS (Eddie)		
2005	(Japan) Super Battle Opera 2005	Street Fighter III: 3rd Strike (2-on-2)	Daigo (Ken), Nuki (Chun-Li)	Winner vs KO (Yun), Kokujin (Dudley)			
2005	(Japan) Super Battle Opera 2005	Capcom Fighting Jam (2-on-2)	Urien/Guile	2nd			
2005	(Japan) 4th Cooperation Cup	Street Fighter III: 3rd Strike (5-on-5)	Deshi KFG (Ken), Hayao (Hugo), Boss (Yang), Raoh (Chun-Li), Daigo (Ken)	Winner vs Hitotsume (Ken), AFM (Chun-Li), Erotic Teacher (Dudley), Onanizumu (Urien), Spell Master J (Ken)			
2004	(England) Absolution 2004	Street Fighter III: 3rd Strike	Ken	Winner vs Izu (Makoto)			
2004	(England) Absolution 2004	Super Street Fighter II Turbo	Ryu, Balrog, O.Sagat, Zangief	Winner vs Joseph Zazza (O.Sagat)			
2004	(England) Absolution 2004	Street Fighter Alpha 3	X/A/V-Ryu	3rd	Kiyo (A-Guy) : 1–2		
2004	(England) Absolution 2004	Capcom vs. SNK 2	C-Ken/Sagat/Guile	5th			
2004	(England) Absolution 2004	Guilty Gear XX #Reload	Sol Badguy	Winner vs RF (Faust)			
2004	(United States) Evo 2004	Street Fighter III: 3rd Strike	Ken	2nd	vs KO (Yun) : 2–3		
2004	(United States) Evo 2004	Super Street Fighter II Turbo	O.Sagat, Ryu, Balrog	Winner vs John Choi (O.Sagat, Guile)			
2004	(United States) Evo 2004	Guilty Gear XX	Sol Badguy	Winner vs Kindevu (Eddie)			
2004	(Japan) Kakutou Ishin	Street Fighter III: 3rd Strike		2nd			
2004	(Japan) Kakutou Ishin	Street Fighter Alpha 3		2nd			
2003	(United States) Evo 2003	Street Fighter III: 3rd Strike	Ken	2nd	KO (Yun)		
2003	(United States) Evo 2003	Super Street Fighter II Turbo	Ryu	Winner vs Nuki (Chun-Li)			
2003	(United States) Evo 2003	Capcom vs. SNK 2	C-Guile/Cammy/Sagat	2nd	Ino (K-Blanka/Cammy/Sagat)		
2003	(United States) Evo 2003	Guilty Gear XX	Sol Badguy	Winner vs Miu (Sol Badguy)			
2003	(Japan) Super Battle Opera 2003	Super Street Fighter II Turbo (3-on-3)	Daigo (Ryu), Kurahashi (Guile), Otochun (Chun-Li)	Winner vs KKY (Dhalsim), Akishima (Chun-Li), Yoshimi (Ken)			
2003	(Japan) Super Battle Opera 2003	Guilty Gear XX (3-on-3)	Daigo (Sol Badguy), Arisaka, Pachi	3rd			
2003	(Japan) Super Battle Opera 2003	Capcom vs. SNK 2	C-Guile/Chun-Li/Sagat	2nd	Tokido (A-Sakura/Bison/Blanka)		
2000	(Japan) 3rd Official National Tournament	Street Fighter Alpha 3		Winner			
2000	(Japan) 3rd Official National Tournament	Capcom vs. SNK		Winner			
2000	(Japan) X-Mania 2000	Super Street Fighter II Turbo (3-on-3)	Daigo, Kurahashi, Tamashima	3rd			
1999	(Japan) 2nd Official National Tournament	Street Fighter Alpha 3 (3-on-3)	Daigo (V-Ryu), Naori, Imai	2nd			
1998	(Japan) 1st Official National Tournament	Street Fighter Alpha 3	V-Akuma	Winner (United States) International Champion			
1997	(Japan) GAMEST Cup 1997	Vampire Savior	Bishamon	Winner			
1995	(Japan) GAMEST Cup 1995	Vampire Hunter	Pyron	9th			

== See also ==
- Umehara ga kimeta
