= Evo 2012 =

2012 Evolution Championship Series

Tournament information
- Location: Las Vegas, Nevada, United States
- Dates: July 6–8
- Tournament format: Double elimination
- Venue: Caesars Palace

Final positions
- Champions: SSF4AE2012: Seon-woo "Infiltration" Lee; UMvC3: Ryan "Filipino Champ" Ramirez; KoFXIII: Kwang-noh "MadKOF" Lee; MK9: Carl "Perfect Legend" White; SFxT 2v2: Seon-woo "Infiltration" Lee and Ryan "Laugh" Ahn; SCV: Naoaki "Shining Depocon" Yanagihara

The 2012 Evolution Championship Series (commonly referred to as Evo 2012 or EVO 2012) was a fighting game event held at Caesars Palace, Las Vegas on July 6–8. The event featured a major tournament for six fighting games, including Super Street Fighter IV: Arcade Edition and Ultimate Marvel vs. Capcom 3, as well as various smaller-scale competitions.

== Background ==
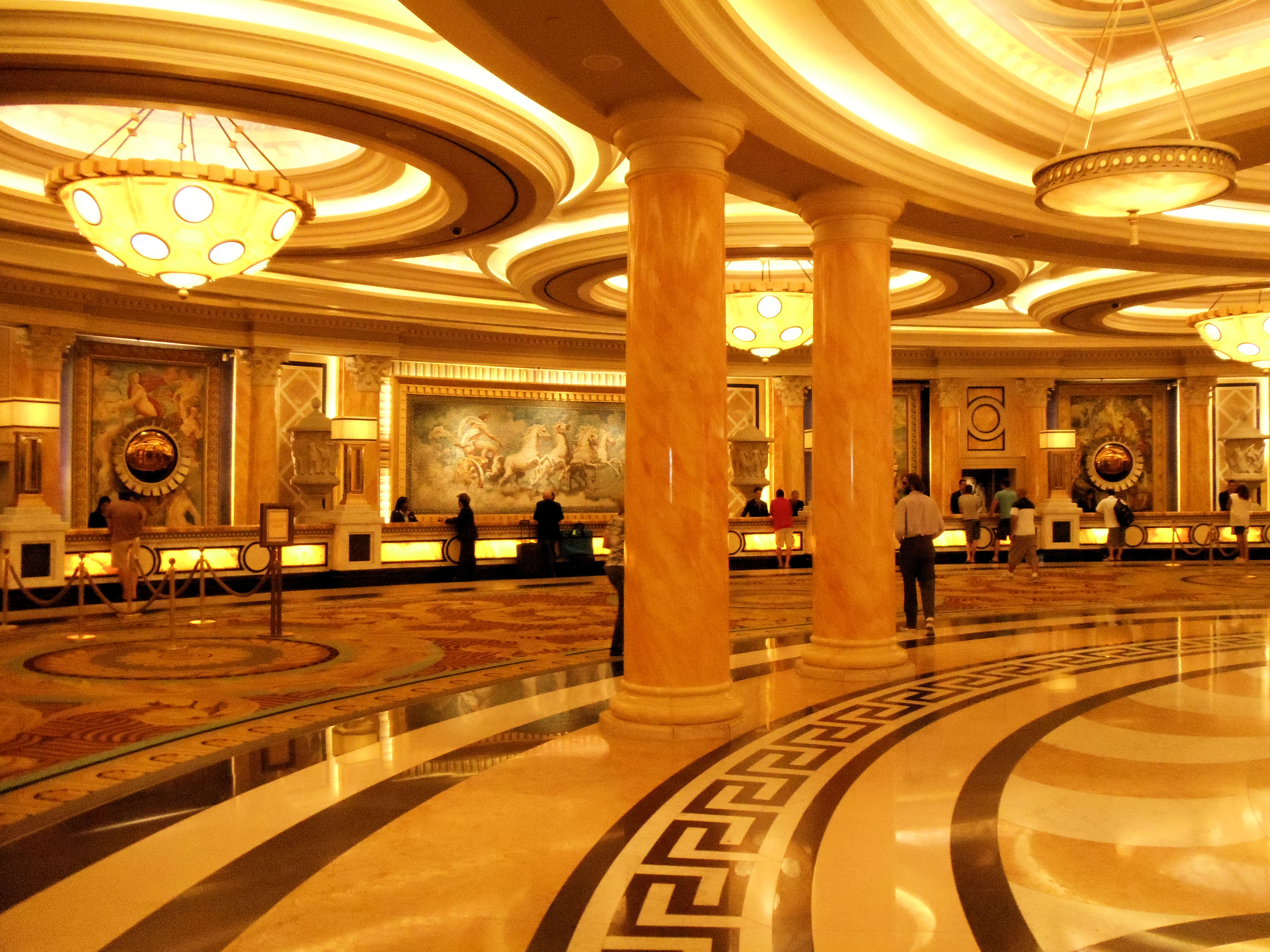
Evo 2012 was held in Caesars Palace, Las Vegas.

Held in Caesars Palace, Las Vegas, Evo 2012 featured over 3,500 entrants among its six major tournaments. The tournaments held at Evo 2012 were livestreamed through the Twitch online video service. A "Road to Evo" tournament series started in January 2012, in which competitors could earn seeding points for the main event.

== Games ==
Six major tournaments were held at Evo 2012. The games played were:

- Super Street Fighter IV: Arcade Edition 2012
- Ultimate Marvel vs. Capcom 3
- Street Fighter X Tekken
- Mortal Kombat
- The King of Fighters XIII
- Soulcalibur V

Evo 2012 was the first event in the Championship Series to include a major King of Fighters tournament. The 2011 reboot of the Mortal Kombat series benefited from multiple balancing updates after its release, allowing the game to be popular among the fighting game community where earlier games in the series weren't. The Mortal Kombat tournament featured the second-largest prize pool at Evo 2012, after Street Fighter IV. Spin-off Street Fighter X Tekken, meanwhile, was unpopular among the fighting game community at the time. The game featured various bugs and unbalanced aspects.

The event also featured various smaller-scale competitions, such as an exclusive Super Street Fighter II Turbo tournament, and side tournaments for Virtua Fighter 5: Final Showdown and Skullgirls. Sony showcased a playable demo for PlayStation All-Stars Battle Royale, while NetherRealm Studios revealed gameplay footage of Injustice: Gods Among Us at Evo 2012.

== Tournament summary ==
While the recent release of Street Fighter x Tekken caused players to juggle between more familiar aspects of the characters and the game's more unusual features, the King of Fighters XIII tournament was praised by commentators for its high-level play, unexpected for such a new game. Meanwhile, Brenna Hillier of VG247 described the Mortal Kombat tournament at Evo 2012 as a "mixed bag", featuring plenty of unusual play styles.

Though there was a lot of discussion regarding whether the character Phoenix in Marvel vs. Capcom is overpowered compared to other selectable characters in the game, competitor Filipino Champ won the tournament with the characters Magneto, Dormammu, and Doctor Doom. The final match at Evo 2012 was the Street Fighter IV finals, in which Infiltration defeated GamerBee to claim the title.

== Results ==
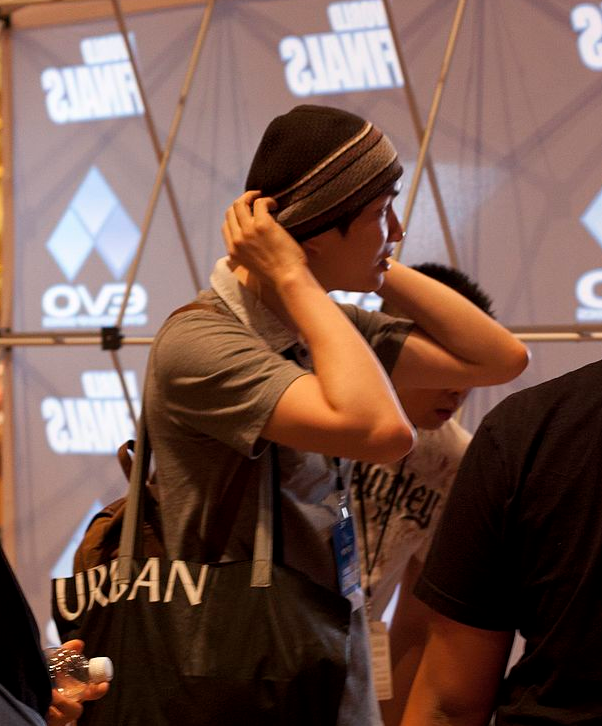
Infiltration at Evo 2012.

Super Street Fighter IV: Arcade Edition (Version 2012)
Place	Player	Alias	Character(s)
1st	(South Korea) Seon-woo Lee	WW.MCZ Infiltration	Akuma, Gouken
2nd	(Taiwan) Bruce Hsiang	AVerMedia GamerBee	Adon
3rd	(United States) Eduardo Pérez-Frangie	CVapor PR Balrog	Balrog
4th	(China) Zhuojun Zeng	eLivePro Qanba Xiaohai	Cammy
5th	(Japan) Daigo Umehara	MCZ Daigo Umehara	Ryu
5th	(Hong Kong) Jonny Cheng	HumanBomb	Sakura
7th	(United States) Kevin Landon	BT Dieminion	Guile
7th	(South Korea) Chung-gon Lee	TH Poongko	Seth

Ultimate Marvel vs. Capcom 3
Place	Player	Alias	Character(s)
1st	(United States) Ryan Ramirez	coL.CC Filipino Champ	Magneto/Dormammu/Doctor Doom, Magneto/Doctor Doom/Phoenix
2nd	(United States) Carlos Randay	LxG Infrit	Nova/Spencer/Sentinel
3rd	(United States) Christopher Gonzalez	FC NYChris G	Morrigan/Doctor Doom/Akuma, Wesker/Ryu/Hawkeye, Morrigan/Doctor Doom/Hawkeye
4th	(United States) Peter Rosas	coL.CC Combofiend	Nova/Spencer/Hawkeye, She-Hulk/Taskmaster/Spencer
5th	(Mexico) César García	TA Frutsy	M.O.D.O.K./Captain America/Taskmaster
5th	(United States) Job Figueroa	Flocker	Zero/Vergil/Hawkeye, Zero/Vergil/Strider Hiryu
7th	(United States) Justin Wong	EG Justin Wong	Wolverine/Storm/Akuma, Spencer/Vergil/Frank West
7th	(United States) Jay Son	Y2J	Wolverine/Spencer/Magneto

The King of Fighters XIII
Place	Player	Alias	Character(s)
1st	(South Korea) Kwang-noh Lee	CafeID MadKOF	Duo Lon, King, Kim, Chin
2nd	(Mexico) Armando Velázquez	IGL Bala	Billy, Iori, Shen, Takuma, Ralf, Clark, Benimaru
3rd	(South Korea) Min-su Shin	CafeID Verna	EX Iori, Duo Lon, Kim, Shen
4th	(South Korea) Pil-su Jun	CafeID Guts	Saiki, EX Iori, Vice, Shen, Mr Karate
5th	(Mexico) José Navarrete	vVv TC Romance	King, Benimaru, Yuri, Hwa
5th	(South Korea) Myung-gu Kang	CafeID Lacid	Ash, Kyo, Kim
7th	(United States) Reynald Tacsuan	AS Reynald	Mr Karate, Benimaru, Kim
7th	(Taiwan) Yang Yao Ren	Yang Yao Ren	Mr Karate, Mature, Hwa

Mortal Kombat
Place	Player	Alias	Character(s)
1st	(United States) Carl White	EMP KN Perfect Legend	Kung Lao
2nd	(United States) Emmanuel Brito	vVv NOS CD Jr.	Jax, Kabal, Rain
3rd	(United States) Brant McCaskill	Pig of the Hut	Kenshi, Mileena
4th	(United States) Malik Terry	IGL MIT	Johnny Cage, Reptile, Scorpion, Stryker
5th	(United States) Christian Quiles	CoCo ForeverKing	Sonya, Kung Lao, Kenshi
5th	(United States) Julian E. Escobar	EGP XBlades	Liu Kang
7th	(United States) Mario Sako	CoCo M2Dave	Freddy Krueger
7th	(United States) Elijah Williamson	EGP Tyrant	Jax

Street Fighter X Tekken 2 vs. 2 Teams
Place	Team Name	Player	Alias	Character(s)
1st	Western Wolves	(South Korea) Seon-woo Lee (South Korea) Ryan Ahn	WW.MCZ Infiltration; WW.MCZ Laugh	Rolento; Ryu
2nd	FGTV	(United States) Eduardo Pérez-Frangie (United States) Ricki Ortiz	CVapor PR Balrog; EG Ricky Ortiz	Ryu; Rufus
3rd	Mad Catz/Razer	(Japan) Hajime Taniguchi (Japan) Keita Ai	MCZ Tokido; RZR Fuudo	Chun Li; Ryu
4th	Complexity Cross Counter	(United States) Peter Rosas (United States) Mike Ross	coL.CC Combofiend coL.CC Mike Ross	Julia; Marduk
5th	TotalHeads	(Japan) Joe Egami (South Korea) Chung-gon Lee	TH MOV; TH Poongko	Ryu; Kazuya
5th	Eternal Rivals/PxG	(United States) Richard Nguyen (United States) Darryl Lewis	ER MCZ Richard Nguyen; PxG SnakeEyes	Law; Zangief
7th	KazBon	(Japan) Ryota Inoue (Japan) Masato Takahashi	Kazunoko; Bonchan	Raven; Ken
7th	Algo Cacho	(Chile) Victor Duarte (Chile) Rubén Ponce	Evil_Craa; Sicario	Ryu; Rolento

Soulcalibur V
Place	Player	Alias	Character(s)
1st	(Japan) Naoaki Yanagihara	Shining Decopon	Tira
2nd	(Singapore) Jovian Chan	Shen Chan	Cervantes
3rd	(United States) Omar Mohammed	Something-Unique	Pyrrha
4th	(United States) Jonathan Vo	Woahhzz	α Patroklos
5th	(Japan) Michio Irie	CRNA Ruka	Patroklos
5th	(United States) Sean Paquette	Xephukai	Astaroth, Patroklos
7th	(Japan) Takeaki Takahata	Kamaage	Mitsurugi
7th	(South Korea) Moon-su Jang	CafeID Kura	Patroklos
