= E. Honda =

Street Fighter character

E. Honda (Edmond Honda)
- Street Fighter character
- E. Honda in Street Fighter Alpha 3 (1998)
- First game: Street Fighter II (1991)
- Created by: Akira "Akiman" Yasuda
- Designed by: Akira "Akiman" Yasuda; Eri "Erichan" Nakamura
- Voiced by: English: Richard Epcar (Street Fighter II: The Animated Movie); Paul Dobson (Street Fighter animated series); John Snyder (2007–present); Japanese: Masahiro Anzai (VHS/DVD dub of the Street Fighter film); Yasushi Ikeda (Real Battle on Film); Nobuaki Fukuda (TV Asahi dub of the Street Fighter film); Daisuke Gōri (Street Fighter II: The Animated Movie); Masashi Sugawara (1998–2001); Yoshikazu Nagano (2007–present)
- Portrayed by: Peter "Navy" Tuiasosopo (Street Fighter film, games); Hirooki Goto (2026 film)

In-universe information
- Origin: Japan
- Nationality: Japanese
- Fighting style: Sumo

Edmond Honda (Japanese: エドモンド 本田), better known as E. Honda, is a character created by Capcom for the Street Fighter fighting game series. Introduced in Street Fighter II as part of the starting lineup, he has appeared in Street Fighter Alpha 3, Street Fighter IV and the Capcom vs. SNK series, and made several cameos. Honda is a professional sumo wrestler and sentō proprietor. He is one of the original eight playable characters in Street Fighter II, representing Japan alongside Ryu.

== Conception and design ==
Conceived by Akira "Akiman" Yasuda, Honda was designed by Eri Nakamura, with oversight by Akiman due to how new she was at the company. Initially named "Sumo", they wanted to give him a Japanese sounding name, considering "Suzuki" or "Tanaka" before settling on Honda, which they felt would be more familiar to Western audiences. The development team held a rock paper scissors match to pick who would work on which character with Nakamura coming in second and choosing him over "the Beast", a character that would later become Blanka. The character was meant to have above average strength, but below average speed, and intended to be popular in Japan but to also make Japanese fighting styles appeal to foreigners. When creating his design and others for Street Fighter II, Akiman leaned heavily into the concepts of caricature and stereotypes to emphasize the contrast between the characters but also make them instantly recognizable, stating in an interview with Steve Hendershot "subconsciously, I was adding elements with the idea that they could go viral. I wanted a reaction, and perfect things don't instigate many reactions,” an idea partially influenced by his reaction to Mickey Rooney's depiction of an Asian character in the film Breakfast at Tiffany's. To differentiate Honda from returning character Ryu, with design notes on the character stating "We made him more 'Japan' than necessary to make it clear to foreigners." Akiman additionally described him as "a character I knew would create misunderstandings about Japan. And that's exactly how I wanted to make him."

Standing 185 centimetres (6 ft 1 in), early designs turned in resembled a regular sumo wrestler too closely and producer Akira Nishitani suggested they make him look more "oriental", resulting in the additions of his yukata and kabuki face paint. Nakamura chose the latter in response to Akiman stating that his "face was lacking", feeling the makeup would illustrate his pride for Japan, and even considered making him "a hero for justice" when fleshing out the concept. However, this caused some controversy after the game was released, as some outlets banned imagery of Honda due to some organizers feeling his facepaint was "sacrilege to the Japanese national sport." Meanwhile, the yukata was intended to give him more of a distinctive look over just a traditional sumo wrestler's belt, a detail Nakamura attributed to Akiman's suggestion. While he has had a wide variety of secondary outfits in the later installments of the series, his appearance from Street Fighter II has served as the basis for his primary outfit in each title, with only occasional minimal changes.

Akiman's idea for Honda's gameplay revolved around the idea of him rushing at his opponent, stating, "I wanted the fat characters like Honda to come charging at you—for some reason. I feel that fat characters have a duty to charge." Nakamura took this concept and gave him his horizontal flying headbutt attack. Named "Super Zutsuki" in the notes she was given, she considered what made it super, and reasoned he had to fly. The concept completely surprised both Akiman and Nishitani, who saw it for the first time in game. Other attacks such as his Hundred Hand Slap, in which he attacks with a rapid flow of palm strikes, were fleshed out by the pixel artists on the team, and then drawn on paper by Nakamura.

== Appearances ==
As introduced in Street Fighter II, Honda is focused on becoming the greatest sumo wrestler of all time, and teaches sumo to several students. However, upon learning that the world outside of Japan did not consider sumo a true sport, he left his dojo and entered the martial arts tournament to prove that sumo wrestlers rank among the greatest fighters in the world.

Honda makes a cameo appearance in Street Fighter Alpha 2, during Sodom's storyline. Sodom, obsessed with both Japanese culture and trying to revive Mad Gear, attempts to recruit sumo wrestlers, citing them as strong warriors. To achieve this, he enters a sumo wrestling competition and faces "Fujinoyama", who is revealed to be Honda. Agreeing to the match, Honda defeats Sodom but is impressed by his effort nevertheless according to their dialogue in Alpha 3. In Street Fighter Alpha 3, his storyline in this game serves more of a prologue to his appearance in Street Fighter II, with him traveling the world looking for strong opponents and to show the strength of sumo wrestling. Here he meets Ryu and has a sparring match with him and tells Sakura later on where she can find him. About this time he fights Sodom again in a friendly match as well. His wanderings lead him to Shadaloo's base where he meets Zangief and while the actual extent of which is unknown the two are confirmed to have worked together to help destroy the base. In the aftermath he took in a few of Bison's Dolls to give them somewhere to stay until they could regain their memories (which ones in particular is never exactly certain due to Capcom reusing sprites in his ending for the Dolls). According to this game's ending and supported by his card profile in SNK vs. Capcom: Card Fighters DS, he may additionally have given them training in sumo during their stay, though none of his pupils in other games are female leaving this definitely up to question.

Honda returns for Street Fighter IV, which is set shortly after the events of the second World Warrior Tournament. His goals have not changed, as his bio states that he is fighting to promote the technique of sumo. To this end, he goes on a world tour. It is revealed that he is a haridashi-yokozuna (effectively meaning that he is of yokozuna level skill and achievement, but has yet to be officially promoted). His rival fight is against El Fuerte, after which the two share a meal. Honda returns in the fourth season of Street Fighter V, having reopened the Honda Sento bathhouse and working to keep its guests happy. In Street Fighter 6, Honda opens a sumo-themed chankonabe restaurant called Chanko House Edomon in Metro City, which proves to be successful, thanks to Manon's suggestion. Prior to opening his restaurant outside Japan, Honda had a small friendly sumo match with Ryu, and has since been keeping in touch with him.

=== In other media ===
==== Live-action ====
In 1993, Jackie Chan played E. Honde in the live-action adaptation of the manga City Hunter after he is thrown through an SFII arcade game by Ken. The surname was changed to "Honde" due to Chan's deal with Mitsubishi Motors. The late William Duen's Toyota in the parody film Future Cops is based on Honda.

In the 1994 motion picture based on the Street Fighter franchise, the role of Honda is played by Peter "Navy" Tuiasosopo. In the movie, Honda is portrayed as a close associate of Chun Li, serving as her news crew technician and programmer, while aiding her on her quest to avenge her father's death alongside Balrog. Like Balrog, he has a personal grudge against Shadaloo, who ruined his reputation as a sumo (though no details on how are given). In the film's climax he battles Zangief, smashing through Bison's base. This version is mixed-race, having Japanese and Polynesian heritage, and is native to Hawaii, the latter being a mirror to real-life Japanese Americans. His personality is rather laid back compared to his video game counterpart and is shown to have a near immunity to pain when one of Bison's goons attempts to torture him, something he attributes to his discipline in sumo when Balrog asks about it. He does seem to enjoy fighting when he gets a chance to with Zangief, despite the degree of damage that it causes. This version of Honda appeared in both the arcade and console games based on the film. In his arcade ending it states that he returned to the world of professional sumo and regained the title of yokuzuna. The console game took this and expanded upon it, stating that he and Zangief had formed a friendship and had practice matches with Honda only having one win over Zangief. The outcomes of said matches however seem to be just as calamitous as their original bout, resulting in the destruction of five sumo dojos.

Japanese wrestler Hirooki Goto played Honda in the 2026 movie. He is among the fighters who joins the second world championship. Ryu approaches him in a sauna asking to take his place. Honda agrees on the condition that he defeat him, leading to a fight. Ryu is successful and Honda willingly gives up his spot.

==== Animation ====
Honda appears as one of the more prominent characters to appear in the second half of Street Fighter II: The Animated Movie, unlike a majority of the characters that were not heavily involved in the backstory of the game. He is voiced by Daisuke Gori in the original Japanese version and by Richard Epcar in the English dub. His personality is relatively unchanged from that in the games, however his goal is shown to be to fight for cash compared to his in-game goal of proving the strength of sumo to the world. Several aspects of his character appearance here saw usage in the Street Fighter Alpha series much like many other characters, but more so in the Capcom vs. SNK games, where outright nods (such as his run animation being a direct copy of his attempt to charge into Bison) were included in the game. He is first seen wrestling with Dhalsim in Calcutta to win prize money. Dhalsim manages to slip away from his grip however, and attempts to mentally subdue Honda. Ryu's presence however distracts Dhalsim enough for Honda to regain control of the match and win due to forfeit. Honda catches up with Ryu, recognizing he helped him win and the fact Ryu is a fellow Japanese fighter, giving him half the prize money as well as a place to stay for a while. Near the movie's climax, Guile and Bison find Ryu while he is with Honda in the mountains. While Ryu tries to deal with a brainwashed Ken, Honda charges forward to take on Bison, only for Bison to teleport out of his path and Ken strikes him which sends him stumbling forward, straight into Balrog. He and Balrog end up fighting, eventually with both of them falling off a nearby cliff. However Honda seems to recover quickly enough, seen lugging both the unconscious Balrog and Guile (who was knocked out by Bison) back just as Ryu and Ken apparently defeat Bison.

Paul Dobson voices Honda in the animated series, where he works for the team as a computer whiz.

== Promotion and reception ==
In 1993, a Honda action figure was made as part of the G.I. Joe "Street Fighter" line, with a variant later released for the Street Fighter live action movie. The figure is unique compared to the others: no parts were reused to make it, requiring a unique mold to be made due to his size. The character's legs could be squeezed together to have the upper body bend down in a headbutt motion and was jointed to allow kids to recreate his Hundred Hand Slap move. Another action figure was released in 2008 as part of SOTA's Revolutions Series 1, with a limited edition variant using his Street Fighter II Turbo colors. The figure featured a positionable waist, arms, and legs, and an alternate head for a different facial expression.

Honda has been well received since his debut. Gavin Jasper of Den of Geek described him as a likeable guy, "one of those guys who laughs way too hard while smacking you on the back and dislocating your shoulder". They further added that Honda didn't stand out against other sumo wrestlers in video games, until they played him off other loud, proud wrestlers. Sergio Sánchez Trujillo of RetroManiac stated that while Honda is a sumo wrestler, he felt some of his moves were taken from Judo, and compared his aggressive fighting style to that of actor Bud Spencer, both factors that encouraged him to become a better player when using the character and his fondness for him. He noted that while the series did add an actual Judo practitioner years later, Abel, "it was already too late. Edmond had won my heart."

Comic Book Resources briefly cited him as an example of body positivity within the franchise, in light of another series character, Rufus. Paste further elaborated on this point, stating "The joy of Edmund Honda can often be highly personal; he's the one overweight character in the series who doesn't feel like a joke," and added "His moderate size and the way his muscle accentuates his weight instead of undermining it (see Rufus for an example of what we mean) give him an air of respectability." They added he "gives the overweight people among us someone to latch onto amidst all the other examples of overweight characters telling us we should be ashamed of ourselves. [...] E. Honda owns his physique in a way no other character does, and for that he'll always be one of our favorites."

=== In academic study ===
Honda's character and design has also been the topic of academic study. University of Delaware professor Rachael Hutchinson noted that in Street Fighter II Honda acted in part as a Japanese caricature, in part due to the "Rising Sun" imagery used in his stage, describing it as a parody of Japanese nationalism but also a more pointed representation of Japan than fellow Japanese character Ryu. Coupled with his Hundred Hand Slap which tied his sumo technique "into the exotic atmospheres of other nations", she felt these aspects were done to help establish Ryu as the "'regular, everyday Japanese' fighter, reassuring the player of normalcy in the crazy world of Yasuda's imagination" in contrast to Honda.

Meanwhile, the book Convergent Wrestling noted that his addition along with Zangief in Street Fighter II set the game apart from other fighting game titles at the time, due to their role as wrestlers, which helped legitimize wrestling among other martial arts. It further described Honda's look as both "simple and iconic", specifically noting his facepaint, a style known as "kumadori" used in kabuki theatre, signifying Honda as "noble and heroic", while his yukata emphasized that he was non-traditional, as sumo wrestlers tend to not wear anything over their belts in competition. They also noted that his Hundred Hand Slap embodied the primary win conditions of sumo wrestling, pushing the opponent out of the ring, and allowed the player to more properly step into the role of a sumo wrestler when playing as him.

In Nicholas Ware's paper "You Must Defeat Shen Long To Stand a Chance": Street Fighter, Race, Play, and Player, he cited a more direction connection between sumo and kabuki theater made by other scholars, and that his design was composed of multiple cultural signifiers to the Japanese: national sport, traditional theater, and everyday Japanese life. He further described Honda's image as cartoonish, noting his constant use of a deep stance, even when moving, despite sumo matches usually at most only lasting a short period of time. He added that his attire was a bit garish, due to real-life wrestlers only wearing such during ceremonial occasions, but added that his "out-of-place, yet real aspects are emblematic of how Street Fighter treats semiotic markers of race and culture. [...] E. Honda is 'Japanese' in visage, but simply pop culture in construction—he recalls Japan thought his image and supposed profession but is a product of a hybrid, international popular culture aesthetic."
