= Lupe Fiasco versus Daigo Umehara =

2016 game exhibition match

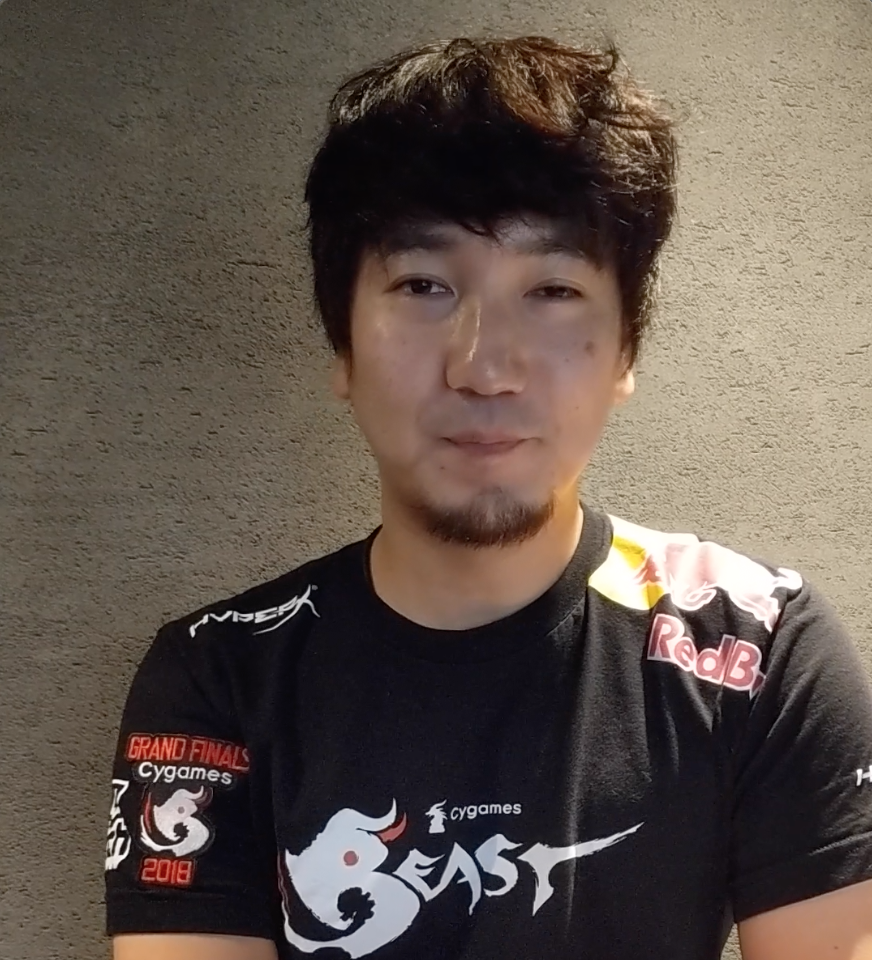
Daigo Umehara

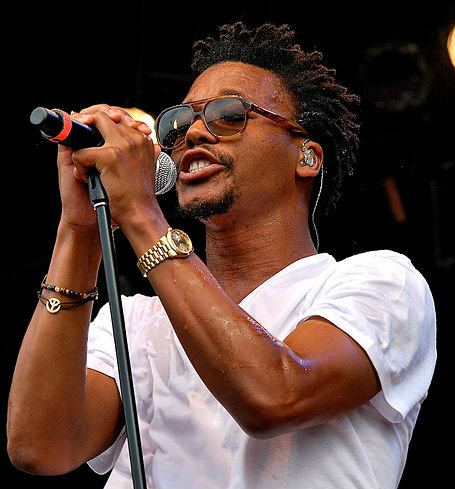
Lupe Fiasco

Lupe Fiasco versus Daigo Umehara was a Street Fighter V exhibition match between rapper Lupe Fiasco and professional Street Fighter veteran Daigo Umehara. The game, held shortly before the public release of Street Fighter V on February 15, 2016, resulted in a three-to-two win for Fiasco. The match has frequently been criticized for possibly being staged, and the celebrity's later association with professional Street Fighter play has resulted in mixed opinions among the fighting game community.

== Background ==
While on tour, Lupe Fiasco released some Twitter messages regarding the Street Fighter franchise. Responding to a question on whether he ever watches the Evolution Championship Series, Fiasco said "Only to study Daigo..." When he was invited to play a match against Daigo Umehara by Mark Julio, community and sponsorship manager for Mad Catz, Fiasco responded with "It would be an honor to lose to Daigo-San." Although the match had not been officially arranged yet, Fiasco stated shortly after with which character he was planning to play and that he was training for the match.

The match was subsequently planned to take place at the Folsom Street Foundry in San Francisco during the Street Fighter V Launch Event on February 15. It was the main exhibition match and part of several pre-launch festivities, and was exclusive to the first 50 people waiting in line. The match was livestreamed on Capcom's official Twitch channel. At the event, Fiasco was gifted a Tournament Edition 2 arcade stick by Mad Catz.

== Match ==
Fiasco versus Umehara featured Fiasco playing as Ken and Umehara playing as Ryu. Fiasco won the first and fourth game, while Umehara beat Fiasco in the second and third. The match ended highly climactically, as both players had won two of the best-of-five games and were tied as they went into the final round.

=== Post-match reactions ===
After Fiasco landed his final KO on Umehara, neither player seemed sure of what happened; Fiasco seemed confused as to what round the game was on until he was notified that the game was over. In an interview shortly after the match, Fiasco stated that he "almost cried on stage," noting that winning against Umehara was a bucket list thing. When asked whether he wanted to compete in future fighting game tournaments, Fiasco stated "I'm retiring... I'll take the win and run, I know when to get out."

When asked about the match by Kotaku, Umehara gave the following response:

I would like to congratulate [Fiasco] on his victory last night, but let's say that you can eagerly await a rematch. The crowd warmly welcomed us and was so excited. I thought it was a great run. Lupe gifted me his own Metal Gear jacket (which I wore at the autograph session latter). I believe it was because he thought we had good matches too!

== Credibility ==
Many journalists and fans believe that the match may have been staged due to the highly climactic final and Fiasco's disregard of the idea of joining future tournaments. The match has been heavily criticized by fans as a poorly veiled marketing ploy to create more buzz for Street Fighter V. Owen S. Good of Polygon suggested that the game may have been similar to an exhibition match in tennis, players of which being "notorious for tanking sets to make sure the show goes the distance and the fans get their money's worth, before playing the last set on the square." When asked by Kotaku if the match was staged, Alex Verrey of Umehara's sponsor Mad Catz responded with "No sir, it was not! Daigo would never allow such a thing."

Other theories for why Umehara lost exist as well, such as that he may have been suffering from the effect of a jetlag or was not able to adapt to the mechanics of Street Fighter V during the match.

== Legacy ==
In the months after the match, Fiasco started forming a connection with several prominent players throughout the fighting game community, developing relationships with players who have a deep interest in the game. In May, Fiasco attended the Street Fighter V tournament Combo Breaker, apparently in order to eventually qualify for the 2016 Capcom Cup. The celebrity's continued interest in the game has produced mixed opinions among the fighting game community. However, some members of the community have suggested that the most important aspect of the Fiasco versus Umehara match was that it may help grow the community more.

Fiasco later made a track titled "Killers", which was used in the hype video that took place before EVO 2016's Street Fighter V finals. The kickoff event of the 2017 Capcom Pro Tour was simultaneously the launch party of Fiasco's album, Drogas Light.
