= Canada Cup (fighting game event) =

Annual Canadian game event

- Formerly: Calgary Cup
- Sport: Fighting games
- Founded: 2009
- Founder: Lap Chi Duong
- Country: Canada
- Qualification: None (open)
- Website: canadacupgaming.com

The Canada Cup is an annual Canadian fighting game event founded and organized by Lap Chi Duong. The event was launched as the Calgary Cup in 2009 and was initially held in Calgary, Alberta, but the tournament moved to Toronto, Ontario shortly after, returning to Calgary every few years. The Canada Cup is a major Street Fighter tournament, generally being the final event in the annual Capcom Pro Tour.

== Description ==
Property manager and granite shop owner Lap Chi Duong organizes the Canada Cup fighting game event once a year. The Street Fighter tournament held at the Canada Cup has been a Premier Event of the Capcom Pro Tour since 2015. David "Atari" Bibona noted in 2016 that the Canada Cup is the biggest gathering of high-level Super Street Fighter II Turbo players, in part due to its international focus, allowing American players to compete with Japanese competitors, where Super Street Fighter II Turbo has a more active scene.

Motherboard described the Canada Cup in 2016 as the "largest and most prestigious fighting game tournament in the country." Daigo Umehara described the Canada Cup as one of his favorite tournaments to attend.

== History ==
The Canada Cup started in 2009 as the Calgary Cup, held in Calgary rather than Toronto. The tournament was rebranded as the Canada Cup the following year as top Street Fighter players like Daigo Umehara and Justin Wong flew in to compete in the competition. In 2011, Duong decided to charge Twitch viewers of the tournaments $8.95 USD for commercial-free, high-definition livestreams, which became a running gag among the fighting game community. Duong moved the tournament to Toronto in 2015, though he had difficulty convincing sponsors and finding support. Duong stated in an interview with Motherboard that he had contacted 200 unique sponsors at the time, and only one responded positively: Mad Catz. The Cup moved back to Calgary for one year in 2014, which Duong noted as the first year it did not operate at a loss.

=== 2015 ===
In 2015, the Canada Cup became the final Premier Event of the Capcom Pro Tour season. The winner of its Super Street Fighter IV tournament automatically qualified for the 2015 Capcom Cup. 13 of the top 23 players in the Capcom Pro Tour rankings competed in the competition, and The Daily Dot described the Canada Cup as the "deepest tournaments of the season". The tournament was eventually won by Tokido, defeating Fuudo in the finale by playing Akuma with a solid ground game.

=== 2016 ===
Canada Cup 2016 hosted 14 tournaments. Duong invited high-level Super Smash Bros. players Armada, Hungrybox, and Mang0 through a publicity stunt, donating a large amount of money to their Twitch streams in order to contact them. The Canada Cup was again the final Street Fighter tournament of the Capcom Pro Tour, and became the first Premier Event in two years to have an American champion: Du "NuckleDu" Dang.

=== 2017 ===
Canada Cup was the final Street Fighter tournament of the 2017 Capcom Pro Tour as well, besides the regional finals. The tournament was attended by players such as Daigo Umehara, Punk, NuckleDu, Yukadon and Problem X. The Canada Cup 2017 Street Fighter tournament was won by Dogura. The event also featured high-level tournaments for Tekken 7, Super Smash Bros. Melee, and Super Smash Bros. 4. A controversy was sparked when competitor Jose Aldape participated in the Marvel vs. Capcom: Infinite tournament under two separate names. Aldape was initially eliminated from the tournament after losing during the "Battle for the Stones" qualifying round, but he reinserted himself in the competition the next day after a friend offered him her spot. Canada Cup organizers decided to replay the pool after a large portion of it had already been completed, and at least one player saw his accomplishments in the pool erased due to the mix-up.

=== 2018 ===
Canada Cup held in October 2018 was part of the Street Fighter 30th Anniversary Collection Tournament Series, featuring a Street Fighter III: 3rd Strike tournament. The event was held at the Enthusiast Gaming Live Expo (EGLX) in Toronto. Canada Cup organizers said they were experiencing "major growing pains", and Chi Duong stated that "working in a convention space for the first year, it became quickly obvious that the trade off for a bigger production is losing the leniency you enjoy in a hotel conference setting." One competitor found himself unexpectedly completely disqualified for the Ultra Street Fighter IV tournament for arriving ten minutes late, and the scheduled live broadcast of the Street Fighter V finals was abandoned due to delays and scheduling issues.

=== 2019 ===
The Canada Cup was again the final Capcom Pro Tour event in 2019, being held on November 1–3. The event returned to Calgary for the first time in four years, being held in the Deerfoot Inn. For the tenth anniversary of the tournament, Canada Cup 2019 had a $50,000 USD prize pool. Actor Cary Tagawa and voice actors Brian Drummond and Peter Kelamis were present at the event.
