= Hong Kong Esports Festival =

2017 esports and music festival

The Hong Kong Esports Festival was an esports and music festival held in Hong Kong from August 25 to August 28, 2017. Held in the Hong Kong Coliseum, the Esports Festival was organized by the Hong Kong Tourism Board in order to strengthen Hong Kong as a tourist destination for the younger generation. This event featured a Street Fighter V tournament that one of the 2017 Capcom Pro Tour Premier Events. The Hong Kong Esports Festival also featured a League of Legends tournament with teams consisting of players from various countries.

== Background ==
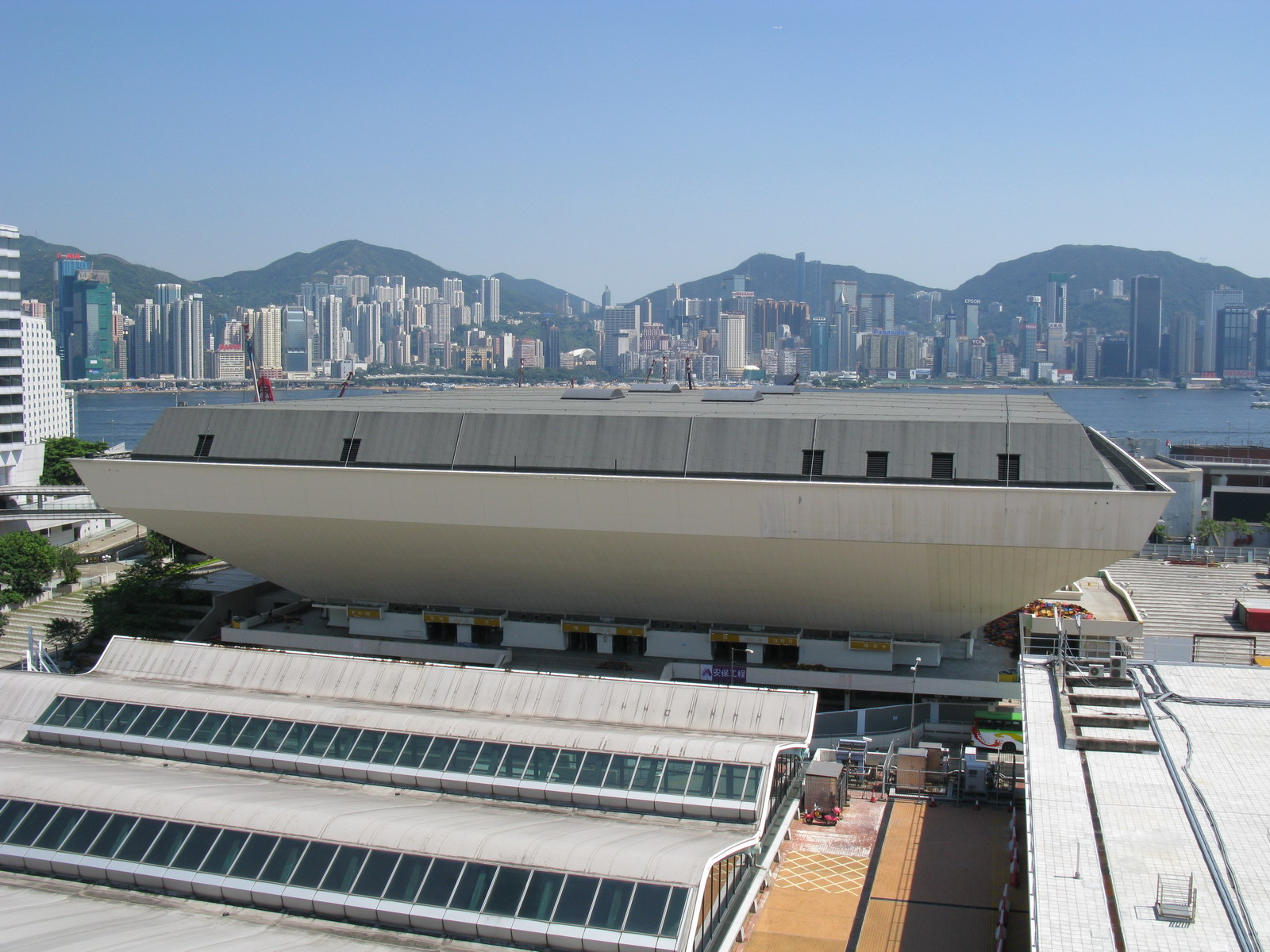
The Esports Festival was held in the Hong Kong Coliseum.

The Hong Kong Esports Festival was held in the Hong Kong Coliseum in Hung Hom in the weekend from August 25 to 28, 2017. The event was organized by the Hong Kong Tourism Board and funded HK$35 million from the Hong Kong government. The Esports Festival was expected to draw in 50,000 visitors, 10% of which would come from overseas. In an interview with the South China Morning Post, general manager of event and product development at the Tourism Board Mason Hung Chung-hing stated that the organizers hope that "through the festival we will be able to make Hong Kong a destination for the younger generation." Sony Interactive Entertainment set up PlayStation consoles outside of the coliseum.

Also serving as a music festival, the Esports Festival featured performances by Korean pop stars and bands such as Exo and Super Junior.

== Street Fighter V tournament ==
Street Fighter V was the only fighting game played competitively at the Hong Kong Esports Festival. This tournament was livestreamed by the CapcomFighters Twitch channel. The tournament was won by Daigo "The Beast" Umehara, defeating Kanamori "Gachikun" Tsunehori in the finals. Playing as Guile, Daigo gained the upper hand in an earlier match against Tsunehori by flooding the stage with ranged attacks, knocking his opponent into the loser's bracket. When the two met again in the grand final, Tsunehori won the first set against Daigo 3-0, but Daigo was able to defeat his opponent in the second set. The Esports Festival was the first Premier Event tournament Daigo had won in nearly a year, and this win essentially guaranteed him a spot in the 2017 Capcom Cup.

Capcom first announced the downloadable content Street Fighter character Menat at the Hong Kong Esports Festival, revealing her in a trailer during a break in the top 8 of the tournament.

Capcom Pro Tour was cancelled for the 2019 tournament due to the Hong Kong protests.

== League of Legends tournament ==
A three-day League of Legends tournament was held at the Hong Kong Esports Festival. Players from Spain, Germany, China, the United States, and Hong Kong competed in order to win the HK$300,000 cash prize. After defeating Team Europe 2-1 on Friday, Team Hong Kong/Macau/Taiwan secured a spot in the grand final against Team China.
