= Street Fighter Alpha 3 =

1998 video game

- Arcade flyer
- Developer: Capcom (Note: Game Boy Advance version developed by Crawfish Interactive.)
- Publishers: Capcom: Arcade; JP: Sega (NAOMI) PlayStation, Dreamcast; JP/NA: Capcom; PAL: Virgin Interactive Entertainment
- Directors: Naoto Ota; Mamoru Ohashi; Koji Okohara
- Producer: Noritaka Funamizu
- Artist: Akira Yasuda
- Composers: Takayuki Iwai; Yuki Iwai; Isao Abe; Hideki Okugawa; Tetsuya Shibata
- Series: Street Fighter
- Platforms: Arcade, PlayStation, Dreamcast, Sega Saturn, Game Boy Advance, PlayStation Portable
- Release: July 15, 1998: Arcade; JP: July 15, 1998; NA: July 1998; JP: February 2001 (Upper) PlayStation; JP: December 23, 1998; NA: May 5, 1999; AU: June 18, 1999; EU: June 25, 1999 Dreamcast; JP: July 8, 1999; NA: May 24, 2000; AU: September 14, 2000; EU: September 29, 2000 Saturn; JP: August 6, 1999 Game Boy Advance; JP: September 27, 2002; EU: November 29, 2002; NA: December 3, 2002; AU: January 9, 2003 PlayStation Portable (as Street Fighter Alpha 3 MAX); JP: January 19, 2006; NA: February 7, 2006; AU: February 24, 2006; EU: March 10, 2006
- Genre: Fighting
- Modes: Single-player, multiplayer
- Arcade system: CP System II; Sega NAOMI (Zero 3 Upper)

Street Fighter Alpha 3, released as Street Fighter Zero 3 (Note: Japanese: ストリートファイターZERO/3, Hepburn: Sutorīto Faitā Zero Surī) in Japan, Asia, South America, and Oceania, is a 1998 fighting game developed and published by Capcom for arcades. It is the third and final installment in the Street Fighter Alpha series, and runs on the same CP System II hardware as previous Alpha games. Alpha 3 further expanded the playable fighter roster from Street Fighter Alpha 2 and added new features such as selectable fighting styles called "isms".

Alpha 3 has also been released on a variety of home platforms starting with the PlayStation version in 1998, which added an exclusive World Tour mode and brought back even more characters, with further versions on the Dreamcast, Sega Saturn, Game Boy Advance, and PlayStation Portable.

== Gameplay ==
Akuma delivers a hurricane kick to Rainbow Mika, on her stage Sardine Beach. Both fighters are using the A-Ism style.

Street Fighter Alpha 3 discards the "Manual" and "Auto" modes from the previous Alpha games, and instead offers three different playing styles known as "isms" for the player to choose from. The standard playing style, A-ism (or Z-ism in Japan), is based on the previous Alpha games, in which the player has a three-level Super Combo gauge with access to several Super Combo moves. X-ism is a simple style based on Super Street Fighter II Turbo (the term "X-ism" being a reference to that game's Japanese title, Super Street Fighter II X), in which the player has a single-level Super Combo gauge and access to a single but powerful Super Combo move. The third style, V-ism (or "variable" style), is a unique style that allows the player to perform custom combos similar to the ones in Street Fighter Alpha 2, but cannot use Super Combos. In X-ism, the player cannot air-block nor perform Alpha Counters, and can only use one Super Combo move in its powerful Level 3 version. To activate V-ism's Custom Combo, the player must press both kick and punch buttons of the same strength. X-ism has the highest attack power but the least defense. A-ism has more attack power than V-ism and a similar level of defense. All three modes have variations of movesets for each character, adding considerable depth to the gameplay. In addition, there are hidden modes that add handicaps to the player as well as benefits (for example, Classic mode prevents the use of Super Combos, but also makes the character unable to be knocked in the air and juggled).

Alpha 3 also introduces a "Guard Power Gauge" which depletes each time the player blocks; if the gauge is completely depleted, then the player will remain vulnerable to an attack. The bar shrinks when broken and is refilled to its new maximum; it can be shrunk a number of times. While the character has the least defense of all modes in X-Ism, it also has the largest guard bar, and vice versa for V-ism with A-Zism being in the middle. Also, the guard bar varies between characters, with Zangief for example having a very large guard bar. The guard bar does not exist in Dramatic Battle matches, so no guard crushing is possible there.

I-ism is a customizable style exclusive to the Dreamcast version's World Tour and Saikyo Dojo modes and the PSP version's World Tour mode.

The controls for several actions have been modified from the previous Alpha games. For example, the level of a Super Combo move in A-ism is now determined by the strength of the attack button pressed (i.e. Medium Punch or Kick for a Level 2 Super Combo), rather than the number of buttons pushed; throwing is now done by pressing two punch or kick buttons simultaneously.

== Plot ==
Two years after the events of Street Fighter Alpha 2. Various World Warriors follow a path that leads them to track down M. Bison and his Doomsday Device, the Psycho Drive, and just like the first two Alpha games, Each character has their own storylines, their rivals in their fifth and ninth matches, final battle against M. Bison, their own endings involving them defeating Bison, some of them invading the Shadaloo base and destroying the Psycho Drive, which causes Bison’s body to explode. Bison’s soul survives and possesses Rose, but Shadaloo scientists created him a new body.

== Characters ==
The game brings back all eighteen of the characters that appeared in Street Fighter Alpha 2. As with the previous Alpha titles, several characters were added to the game: Cammy, who was previously featured in the console-exclusive Street Fighter Alpha 2 Gold, E. Honda, Blanka, Balrog (who is an unlockable character), and Vega. New characters introduced in Alpha 3 include R. Mika, a Japanese female wrestler who idolizes Zangief; Karin Kanzuki, Sakura's rival who was first introduced in the Street Fighter manga Sakura Ganbaru! by Masahiko Nakahira; Cody from Final Fight, who has since become an escaped convict; and Juli (full name: Julia) and Juni, two of Shadaloo's "Dolls" who serve as Bison's brainwashed assassins and guards and who are unlockable characters (Juli is revealed to be T. Hawk's long-lost lover).

The PlayStation version makes Balrog, Juli and Juni immediately playable and adds the remaining characters introduced in Super Street Fighter II: Dee Jay, Fei Long and T. Hawk, along with Guile from Street Fighter II, and Evil Ryu and Shin Akuma from Street Fighter Alpha 2, the latter three being unlockable. The Dreamcast and Saturn versions move Guile, Evil Ryu and Shin Akuma to the default roster (although the latter shares a slot with his regular counterpart and is playable via a special button combination). The more powerful version of M. Bison who is the true final boss of Alpha 3 with the special Shadaloo-ism meter, Final M. Bison, is also made playable in these Sega versions via a code.

The Game Boy Advance version contains all of the characters from previous versions, as well as three additional characters: Yun from Street Fighter III, Maki from Final Fight 2, and Eagle from the original Street Fighter, all three based on their incarnations from Capcom vs. SNK 2: Mark of the Millennium 2001. The PlayStation Portable version, Street Fighter Alpha 3 MAX, also adds Ingrid from Capcom Fighting Evolution, to bring the total playable character count to 39. All characters are also playable in the Capcom Fighting Collection 2 version of the game.

- Adon
- Akuma
- Balrog
- Birdie
- Blanka
- Cammy
- Charlie
- Chun-Li
- Cody
- Dan
- Dee Jay (Note: Upper, console, and handheld versions only)
- Dhalsim
- E. Honda
- Eagle (Note: Handheld versions only)
- Evil Ryu
- Fei Long
- Final M. Bison
- Gen
- Guile
- Guy
- Ingrid (Note: MAX version only)
- Juli
- Juni
- Karin
- Ken
- M. Bison
- Maki
- R. Mika
- Rolento
- Rose
- Ryu
- Sagat
- Sakura
- Shin Akuma
- Sodom
- T. Hawk
- Vega
- Yun
- Zangief

== Home versions ==
- Street Fighter Alpha 3 was initially ported in 1998 to the PlayStation, selling a million copies. This version replaced the "hit" sprites with "hit" polygons in order to focus more memory on character animations. Juli, Juni and Balrog were added to the immediate regular roster, and they were given new character portraits and their own storylines. Dee Jay, Fei Long and T. Hawk (the remaining "New Challengers" from Super Street Fighter II) were also included in the roster. Guile, Evil Ryu and Shin Akuma (the latter sharing a slot with his regular counterpart) were also added as secret characters that can be unlocked through the World Tour mode, a mode that allows the player to strengthen and customize their chosen character's fighting style while traveling around the world. An additional feature in the Japanese version also made use of the PocketStation peripheral, which allows the player to build up their character's strength. In this version, Shin Akuma serves as the final boss for Evil Ryu, as well as a secret boss in Final Battle. Due to RAM limitations, the only unique pairings available for a complete campaign in the Dramatic Battle mode are Ryu & Ken and Juli & Juni; other character combinations can only be used for one-match battles. The AI for the Dramatic Battle and Survival modes is exceptionally poor with the CPU neglecting to defend against sweep attacks, likely another consequence of RAM limitations. As is frequently the case with home versions of arcade games, the lesser amount of frames allows for certain combos, often infinite, that are not possible in the arcade version (particularly when using V-Ism mode and in Dramatic Battle and Survival stages). This version was re-released for download on the North American PlayStation Network on October 18, 2011.
- The 1999 Dreamcast version, titled Street Fighter Alpha 3: Saikyo Dojo (or Street Fighter Zero 3: Saikyō-ryū Dōjō in Japan), uses all the added features from the PlayStation version of the game, but features a different World Tour mode. Guile, Evil Ryu and Shin Akuma are immediately selectable, although the latter still shares a slot with his regular counterpart and is playable via a special button combination. An online mode was added, allowing the player to display their high score. In addition, a Saikyo Dojo mode was added, which pits a character that the player has built up in World Tour mode against a very strong opponent who had to be downloaded from the Internet and changed every week. The Dreamcast version was re-released in Japan in 2000 as Street Fighter Zero 3: Saikyō-ryū Dōjō for Matching Service as a mail order title via Dreamcast Direct. The Matching Service version differs from the original with the addition of an Online Versus mode.
- The Sega Saturn version of Street Fighter Zero 3 was released in 1999 in Japan only, shortly after the initial Dreamcast version. This version makes use of Sega's 4-MB RAM cartridge and uses all the features from the PlayStation version except for the polygon usage and PocketStation mode. The Saturn version uses the extra RAM to include more animation frames and sprites, but it's still nowhere near arcade-perfect, the backgrounds and characters are stretched due to lower resolution. Similarly to the Dreamcast version, Guile, Evil Ryu and Shin Akuma are immediately selectable, with the latter sharing a slot with his regular counterpart and playable via a special button combination. While the World Tour and Survival modes are virtually unchanged from the PlayStation version, the Dramatic Battle mode received some improvements with the inclusion of a 2-player mode and the addition of the Reverse Dramatic Battle mode, in which the player faces two computer-controlled characters simultaneously. This and the PlayStation Portable versions are also the only ones to feature the Dramatic Battle mode against the entire roster of characters, as all other versions limit this mode to boss characters only. The CPU for the Dramatic Battle mode is far superior to the PlayStation version. Another minor change is the revised scoring system for some moves in the game: for example, many characters that earn 3000 points per hit from a grab move (a very important fact to exploit for the World Tour mode, where the score is the player's experience points) do not receive as much in the Saturn version. The features, characters etc. of the first home version on the PlayStation are available straight away in the Saturn version.
- Street Fighter Zero 3 was re-released for the arcade in Japan in 2001 under the title Street Fighter Zero 3 Upper (officially promoted as Street Fighter Zero 3↑). The game was released by Sega for their Dreamcast-based NAOMI hardware and features all six characters from the home console versions as well as some balance changes, most notably the removal of the "crouch canceling" glitch which allowed for V-ISM infinite combos. Upper also allows the player to upload any customized characters from the Dreamcast version of the game by inserting a VMU into a memory card slot on the cabinet.
- A Game Boy Advance version developed by Crawfish Interactive was released in 2002 under the title Street Fighter Alpha 3 Upper (Street Fighter Zero 3 Upper in Japan, officially promoted as Street Fighter Alpha 3↑ and Street Fighter Zero 3↑ respectively). The version is compressed and lacks several stages and music tracks from the previous arcade and console versions, although all of the characters are present. In addition, Eagle, Maki, and Yun, all of whom were characters from Capcom vs. SNK 2 (2001), were added to the game. Only a small number of character voices were included in this version due to storage limitations, which the developers worked around by having characters share voice samples, modified with real-time pitch shifting, such as using a higher pitched version of Ken's voice for Sakura's attack calls.
- The PlayStation Portable version, titled Street Fighter Alpha 3 MAX (Street Fighter Zero 3 Double Upper in Japan, officially promoted as Street Fighter Zero 3↑↑), was released in 2006 and features the additional characters from the GBA version as well as Ingrid from Capcom Fighting Evolution. This version is a near-faithful conversion of the arcade version with reduced loading times and all frames and sprites intact. All of the added characters now feature their own in-game storylines and endings. The Dramatic Battle mode in this version (as well as the Saturn version) is the only one where both the player and partner characters can be selected individually (allowing for any character pairing). It also includes the Reverse Dramatic Battle mode from the Saturn version, an exclusive tag mode called "Variable Battle", which is similar to the Dramatic Battle mode but in which the player can tag in and out their partner, and a mode called "100 Kumite" (a 100-fight series). Due to hardware limitations, there is no support for vibration, local two player mode, or additional buttons (the handheld has only six buttons in total instead of eight).
- Street Fighter Alpha Anthology (Street Fighter Zero: Fighters' Generation in Japan) was released in 2006 for the PlayStation 2. It contains the arcade version of Alpha 3 as one of the immediately available games, along with a revised version of Zero 3 Upper called Alpha 3 Upper as a secret game. Both games feature Dramatic Battle and Survival modes in addition to the Arcade, Versus, and Training modes, but not the World Tour mode that was featured in the previous home versions nor the extra characters introduced in the portable versions of the game. In Upper, all six characters that were added in the home console versions are readily available.
- Street Fighter Alpha 3 has an arcade-perfect inclusion via Street Fighter 30th Anniversary Collection for the PlayStation 4, Xbox One, Nintendo Switch and Windows via Steam, released in 2018. The original 28 characters appear in the title, but those extra characters who were playable in the console ports as well as both Upper and Double Upper are not included due to the game being an emulation of the original arcade. Save states are available to allow the player to resume from where they left. The game, along with Street Fighter II: Hyper Fighting, Super Street Fighter II Turbo and Street Fighter III: 3rd Strike - Fight for the Future, has online functionality.
- The arcade version of Street Fighter Alpha 3 Upper was re-released in 2025 as part of Capcom Fighting Collection 2. An update added the four characters from Alpha 3 MAX.

== Reception ==
Reception

Aggregate scores
Aggregator	Score		
Aggregator	Dreamcast	PS	Saturn
GameRankings	86%		
Metacritic		93%	

Review scores
Publication	Score		
Publication	Dreamcast	PS	Saturn
AllGame	4.5/5	4.5/5	
Computer and Video Games	5/5	5/5	
Eurogamer	9/10		
Famitsu	8/10, 8/10, 8/10, 9/10	32/40	32/40
GameFan		288/300	
GamePro	18.5/20; 4/5	5/5	
GameSpot	9/10	8/10	
Hyper		90%	
IGN	9.5/10	9.3/10	
Next Generation		4/5	
Official U.S. PlayStation Magazine		5/5	
PlayStation: The Official Magazine		9/10	
Dreamcast Magazine	27/30		

Award
Publication	Award
PSM	Starplayer

In Japan, Game Machine listed Street Fighter Alpha 3 on their September 1, 1998 issue as being the second most-successful arcade game of the month. Its April 15, 2001 issue reported that Zero 3 Upper was the best-selling arcade game of the month.

On release, Famitsu magazine scored the Sega Saturn version of the game a 32 out of 40; they later scored it 30 out of 40. The PlayStation version also scored 32 out of 40 on release.

The Official UK PlayStation Magazine said that the game would outlast Tekken 3, and stated "the only thing to tarnish this is the graphics. So if you think gameplay is more important than texture-mapped polygons, consider the score to be a ten."

Next Generation reviewed the PlayStation version of the game, rating it four stars out of five, and stated that "Capcom may have outdone itself with the most playable and innovative fighting game since the original Street Fighter II."

Game Informer gave the PlayStation portable version of the game an overall score of 7.75 out of 10 praising how the game being a great version of the classic fighting game and the gameplay and loading times as being seamless and stating “a perfect arcade conversion that will please Street Fighter fans.”

By 2003, the Game Boy Advance version had sold over 30,000 copies. Meanwhile, the original PlayStation version sold a million units as of June 2016.

In 2019, Game Informer ranked it as the 18th best fighting game of all time.

== Sources ==
- Studio Bent Stuff (September 2000). All About Capcom Head-to-Head Fighting Games 1987–2000. A.A. Game History Series (Vol. 1) (in Japanese). Dempa Publications, Inc. ISBN 4-88554-676-1.
