= Super Street Fighter IV: Arcade Edition =

2010 video game

- North American cover art
- Developers: Capcom; Dimps (Note: Ported to Windows by QLOC)
- Publisher: Capcom
- Director: Yasuyuki Oda
- Designers: Atsushi Tamamura; Mitsuo Matsuyama
- Series: Street Fighter
- Engine: Custom
- Platforms: Arcade, PlayStation 3, Xbox 360, Microsoft Windows
- Release: Arcade: JP/NA: December 16, 2010; EU: January 25, 2011; Download; June 7, 2011; Console physical: NA: June 28, 2011; JP: June 30, 2011; EU: June 24, 2011; Microsoft Windows; July 5, 2011
- Genre: Fighting
- Modes: Single-player, multiplayer

Super Street Fighter IV: Arcade Edition is an update to Super Street Fighter IV, originally released in 2010 for the arcades. It has been ported in 2011 for Microsoft Windows, PlayStation 3, and Xbox 360.

== Gameplay ==
This version of the game aims at bringing the improvements from the arcade version of Super Street Fighter IV to home systems. Every character received various tweaks, ranging from character balancing to new EX moves. The game also added twin brothers Yun and Yang from the Street Fighter III series as playable characters, and made Evil Ryu and Oni, previously only available as hidden bosses, playable out of the box.

== History ==
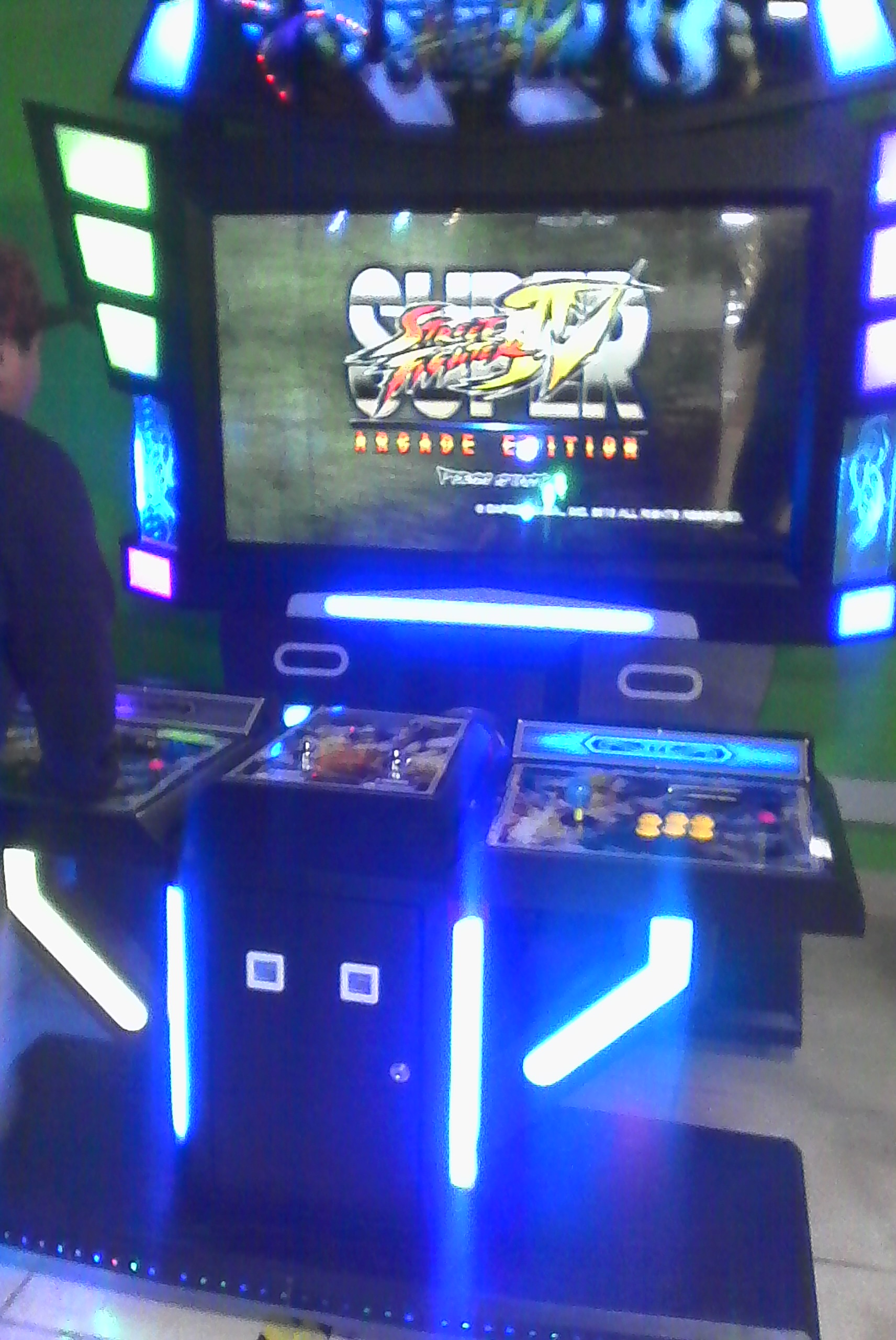
A Super Street Fighter IV: Arcade Edition arcade cabinet

On April 4, 2010, an arcade version of Super Street Fighter IV was confirmed by producer Yoshinori Ono during the Japanese Street Fighter IV finals. Various playtests were handled in various arcades as well as appearing during the Street Fighter IV finals at Tougeki - Super Battle Opera. Shortly before release, images showing debug Xbox 360 achievements from Microsoft's PartnerNet service featuring characters previously only seen in the arcade version of the game were leaked, hinting at a future game update for home systems. In April 2012, before the announcement of Ultra Street Fighter IV, Capcom community manager Seth Killian had announced that the Arcade Edition would be the final version of the Street Fighter IV series.

=== Release ===
The console versions of Arcade Edition were first presented during Capcom's 2011 Captivate event. It was released on June 7, 2011, for the Xbox 360 and PlayStation 3 as online downloadable content and physical media on June 28, 2011. Although initially questioned due to the rampant piracy the original Street Fighter IV suffered on the platform, on April 12, 2011, it was announced that a PC version of Arcade Edition would be released on July 5, 2011.

The update is available as downloadable content in the console versions, and as a retail game for Xbox 360, PlayStation 3 and Microsoft Windows. When updating regular Super Street Fighter IV in the console versions, players get the ability to switch between regular Super and the Arcade Edition. The "Replay Channel" has been expanded to allow players to follow others' recent games, distribute replays, and watch a special channel featuring proficient players. The Microsoft Windows version also features a benchmark test for computers and makes use of Games for Windows Live.

=== Updates ===
On August 11, 2011, Capcom announced that a free balance patch called "Version 2012" would be released for all versions of SSFIV:AE. The update was released on December 13, 2011, for the console versions, with the Windows patch becoming available on February 28, 2012.

On May 30, 2014, Capcom deployed a "Version 2014" patch that switched the PC version of game's online services from Games for Windows – Live to Steam's servers. The update also introduced some GUI improvements, a reworked achievement system, and an updated replay system. Controversy arose regarding the fact that any DLC purchased through GFWL was lost in the transition. GFWL will still be able to be used until its shutdown.

=== Ultra Street Fighter IV ===
A new update, Ultra Street Fighter IV, was released in 2014. Alongside the usual balance improvements, the update introduced six new stages and five new characters: Rolento, Elena, Hugo and Poison (all four of which had been featured in Street Fighter X Tekken), in addition to Decapre, one of Bison's Dolls. The update is offered in the form of a purchased downloadable update to SSFIV:AE, as well as a standalone retail game.

== Reception ==
Reception

Aggregate score
| Aggregator | Score |
|---|---|
| Metacritic | PS3: 80/100; X360: 78/100; PC: 84/100 . |

Review scores
| Publication | Score |
|---|---|
| Famitsu | 36/40 (Ultra) |
| GameSpot | 8.0/10 |
| IGN | 8.0/10 |

The game was well received, with GameSpot giving it 8/10 (slightly varying across platforms), and IGN also giving it an 8/10. The game had sold 400,000 units worldwide by December 2011, and 1.1 million by September 2014.
