= Yun and Yang =

Street Fighter characters

- Street Fighter characters
- Yang and Yun in Street Fighter III: 3rd Strike
- First game: Street Fighter III: New Generation (1997)
- Voiced by: English: Yun: Ted Sroka (Street Fighter IV); Todd Haberkorn (Super Street Fighter IV: Arcade Edition); Yang: Ted Sroka (Street Fighter IV); Johnny Yong Bosch (Super Street Fighter IV: Arcade Edition); Japanese: Yun: Koji Tobe (Street Fighter III, 2nd Impact); Kentaro Ito (3rd Strike, Capcom vs. SNK 2, Super Street Fighter IV: Arcade Edition); Yang: Wataru Takagi (Street Fighter III, 2nd Impact); Masakazu Suzuki (3rd Strike, Capcom vs. SNK 2, Super Street Fighter IV: Arcade Edition)

In-universe information
- Fighting style: Bajiquan
- Origin: China
- Nationality: Chinese

Yun (ユン) and Yang (ヤン, Yan) are a pair of fictional characters appearing in the Street Fighter fighting game series. The characters are twin brothers known collectively as the Lee Brothers that made their debut in the original Street Fighter III.

== Conception and design ==
When developing Street Fighter III: New Generation, the development team wanted Yun and Yang to be immediately popular, and gave them the most consideration out of the entire cast. To this end, they emphasized the pair's "boyish youth", but also ensured they were flashier than the game's protagonist, Alex. Kung Fu was chosen as their martial art, as it help emphasize the game's new parry mechanic.

== Appearances ==
In their backstory, Yun and Yang were separated from their birth parents when they were young. They were raised by an adoptive grandfather who runs a restaurant in Hong Kong and have eight underground bosses as godfathers. By the time of Street Fighter III, the two brothers are the leaders of their local town. Yun, the elder of the two, is described as being more responsible, while his younger brother Yang is calmer and more analytical.

In Street Fighter III: 3rd Strike, Yun and Yang set off to fight a mysterious organization (Gill's group, the Illuminati) threatening to take over their village. In their respective endings, Yun and Yang end up driving away Gill from their home town and the two return home to be greeted by their female friend Houmei and her younger sister Shaomei, who both harbor a respective crush on Yun and Yang.

After the Street Fighter III series, Yun appeared as a playable character Capcom vs. SNK 2, in the portable versions of Street Fighter Alpha 3 for the Game Boy Advance and PlayStation Portable and in Capcom Fighting Jam. They both later appeared as playable characters in Super Street Fighter IV: Arcade Edition.

The twins later made a cameo in Chun-Li's introductory cutscene in the console versions of Street Fighter IV and in again in her ending in Super Street Fighter IV. They also made a cameo in the Half Pipe stage in Street Fighter X Tekken.

== Critical reception ==
Yun and Yang received mixed reception since their debut. Gavin Jasper of Den of Geek stated that when Street Fighter III brought in an almost entirely new cast, Yun and Yang "came off like elevator music"; while he felt many of the ideas were out-of-the-box for the roster, having the twins originally be sprite swaps of each other that played exactly the same way felt unnecessary. While he appreciated some of their depictions in later titles and there were aspects to the characters he enjoyed playing, he argued that they were never a pair he was particularly drawn to, and shrugged when they were used as a selling point for Super Street Fighter IV's arcade edition.

Meanwhile, Paste's Suriel Vazquez and Eric Van Allen felt that Yun's appearance screamed "late-90s X-games teen and also Hong Kong", no character in the series overwhelmed their opponent through sheer force quite like he could, while also being one of the most fun to watch in action. While they argued the character design made him strong in any title he was added to, they acknowledged this could make the character feel like a heel. But at the same time, there was an aspect to him that "makes Street Fighter look cool [...] where improvised movements augment muscle memory". Yang on the other hand was more negatively received, with the pair expressing confusion why Capcom felt the character was even necessary. Seeing him as inferior to Yun both in terms of appearance and gameplay, they expressed that while it was unfortunate he was overshadowed by his brother, it only served to illustrate how unneeded the character was even compared to other duos in the franchise.

Journalist John Legend in his retrospective of the Street Fighter III series suggested that Yun and Yang's designs may have taken inspiration from Duo Maxwell and Trowa Barton from the anime Gundam Wing which aired during New Generation's production, citing the visual similarities between the pairs and the development team's desire to have the characters be popular with young audiences. He also cited similarities between Yun's appearance and skateboarder Kien Lieu, stating if such was intentional it helped illustrate how the characters were designed to relate to Japanese youth culture at the time.

Legend pointed out that Yun and Yang's deviation from 2nd Impact onward paralleled the character development of Ryu and Ken in the franchise, who originally played exactly the same but over time evolved into significantly different characters. He expressed that the pair served as part of a recurring element in the Street Fighter franchise of rivalry and brotherhood, both literally and figuratively in referencing the philosophical concepts of Yin and Yang. Legend argued that while Yang was often seen as the "lesser" of the pair particularly in terms of gameplay, he was an example of the development team exercising restraint while giving him greater mobility, particularly in borrowing gameplay elements from Gen.

Jack Slack of Vice meanwhile examined how they represented Chinese martial arts, and noticed while their techniques were "based on bajiquan" they appeared as more a mishmash of different fighting styles. He emphasized that some elements were grounded in reality, such as the importance of shoving to Chinese martial arts, and the light leg stance indicated protection of vitals and kicking speed. Simultaneously, he argued that "nobody in the real world is going to barrel roll into a leaping side kick from the floor", and that some of their techniques such as crescent kicks felt out of place in light of modern martial arts due to their high-risk nature.
