= Rufus (Street Fighter) =

Character from the Street Fighter series

- Street Fighter character
- Rufus in Street Fighter IV
- First game: Street Fighter IV (2008)
- Designed by: Daigo Ikeno
- Voiced by: EN: Christopher Corey Smith; JA: Wataru Hatano

In-universe information
- Fighting style: Self-taught from martial arts films
- Origin: United States
- Nationality: American

Rufus (Japanese: ルーファス, Hepburn: Rūfasu) is a character in Capcom's Street Fighter series of fighting games. Designed by Daigo Ikeno for Capcom's development team, he first appeared in the arcade version of Street Fighter IV and later in related promotions and media for the title.

A very large, overweight martial artist, Rufus seeks to defeat Ken Masters, angered by his claim of being the "number one fighter in America". Along the way he instead fights many people he confuses for Ken due to similar attire or hair color, regardless of gender. The character is voiced by Wataru Hatano in Japanese, and Christopher Corey Smith in English.

Since Rufus's introduction, the character has received a mostly positive reception. Though some criticism has been made over the character's design and aesthetic, the majority have praised the character as exceeding expectations based solely on his appearance.

== Conception and development ==
Rufus' initial design.

While previous Street Fighter titles relied almost solely on Capcom's Research and Development branch, the development team instead allowed other branches of the company to give input on the design of new characters, due to the influx of fan requests from outside Japan. Rufus was designed based upon marketing research on what sorts of characters an American audience would enjoy playing, and was one of several characters considered for inclusion during the game's development.

Designed by Daigo Ikeno, Rufus was initially intended to be a bald slender black male wearing a gi named "King Cobra", meant to be a more acrobatic counterpart to series characters Ryu and Ken and voiced by Wataru Hatano. His fighting style was intended to be "breakung-fu", mixing elements of Chinese martial arts with breakdancing, which they perceived as a fad in the United States at the time, and Ikeno developed the character's concept around it. Midway through the process of recording the character's lines, however, art director Takashi Kamei proposed that they have the character be overweight, an idea Ikeno agreed with. As a result, the design was gradually changed completely, becoming more obese and turned into a blonde, long haired white male, a design which Ikeno later admitted was in fact rushed. The changed appearance surprised many of Capcom's staff members, including Hatano, who remarked "Wait, is that my character?" Rufus final appearance was chosen over his initial design because the developers felt he would "freak people out". Street Fighter IV's executive producer Yoshinori Ono likened his inclusion to that of Blanka in Street Fighter II, noting that Rufus' "over-the-top" design was intended to help set the game apart from the "really cool-looking but ultimately bland" characters of Tekken and Virtua Fighter.

In an interview, Ono noted they made Rufus intentionally silly, adding that he could be called an "American Dan" in terms of being a joke character in the game's roster. He later referred to Rufus as "quite grotesque to look at" when describing the new characters for the game. When asked about comparisons between Rufus and Bob, a character introduced by Namco for their Tekken series around the same time, Ono emphasized that the characters were different in many regards, and while Bob represented a "cool fat guy", Rufus represented a "weird fat guy". Other Capcom staff members including community manager Seth Killian have received the character warmly, noting Rufus as their favorite new character in the series.

Street Fighter IV sound director Masayuki Endou developed the character's musical theme for the title with a "freewheeling spirit" in mind due to Rufus's motorcycle and personality, utilizing an American drummer and drum set for parts of the theme. Feeling it would be an interesting approach, Hatano's recorded voice samples to be incorporated into the character's background music. The development team agreed, feeling that his voice gave the character presence and fit Rufus' overall image.

=== Personality and design ===
Rufus is an American motorcycle repair shop mechanic. Using a self-taught fighting style from watching martial arts films and putting his own spin on the attacks, he believes he is handsome and America's best martial artist. Rufus takes himself very seriously in this regard, to the point of referring to himself as "Lord Rufus" and regarding rude people as beneath him. Capcom describes the character as having a hasty personality, prone to jumping to conclusions to achieve a goal and sacrificing accuracy for speed. Rufus tends to speak in a long-winded manner, demonstrated through considerably long victory quotes at the end of fights. His girlfriend, Candy, accompanies him as a result of him protecting her from an angry waiter she attempted to bilk and paying the bill.

Rufus is depicted as a large, heavily obese blond male. His head is mostly bald, with a long braided ponytail jutting from the top, and a mustache extending down the sides of his mouth to his chin. His clothing consists of a yellow and black sleeveless jumpsuit with padded shoulders, with the closing straps left open due to his girth and exposing the center of his torso and lower abdominal hair. Black shoes cover his feet, while black fingerless gloves cover his hands and most of his forearms. His secondary outfit is similar, changing the jumpsuit to a dark blue and green version with sleeves and a raised collar, additionally removing the gloves and changing his hairstyle to a double ponytail. Other alternate designs were considered but rejected, amongst which included an Elvis impersonator appearance and martial artist attire. Rufus stands 196 centimetres (6 ft 5 in) tall, and weighs 185 kilograms (408 lb).

For Super Street Fighter IV, a third outfit intended to resemble the Chinese jiangshi was included, consisting of a long Chinese robe, black hat with his ponytail extruding from the top, yellow and black striped pants, and a yellow strip of paper meant to represent a sealing charm extending from the front of the hat and over his face. The developers considered to have the charm able to be knocked off by an opponent's attacks, and as a result alter his attack patterns and power; however, they felt this overcomplicated the character, and instead abandoned the idea. Assistant producer Natsuki Shiozawa cited the outfit as one of her five favorites in the game, feeling that design suited his body well.

== Appearances ==
Introduced in the 2008 video game Street Fighter IV, Rufus is angered that martial artist Ken Masters is declared the best fighter in America. Per his girlfriend Candy's suggestion that he find and defeat Ken to prove himself as the best, Rufus declares Ken his rival and sets out to find him. However, he repeatedly mistakes other fighters for Ken, attacking blond-haired or similarly-dressed people regardless of gender, and blames the mistaken identities on his belief Ken is using decoys to delay him, notably, the character Abel. He eventually confronts Ken, who states he does not know who Rufus is, which angers him further before they fight. In the game's conclusion, Rufus is shown pushing his broken down motorcycle uphill with Candy on board, using it as training and blaming Ken for the predicament. His ending is updated for his appearance in the game's first upgrade, Super Street Fighter IV, where after getting his motorcycle repaired, at Candy's request for a colder climate they head due north to the North Pole.

In crossover fighting game Street Fighter X Tekken, after returning from the North Pole Rufus wins a martial arts tournament, but is angered that his accomplishment is ignored in light of the recent Pandora anomaly at the South Pole. The large Russian wrestler Zangief however takes notice of his victory, and tasked with retrieving the anomaly by the Russian government, convinces Rufus to help him. When they reach the South Pole, the anomaly opens and bathes them in light, reducing their bodies to a sleeker appearance before disappearing much to their combined horror. Rufus initially fears Candy will not recognize him, but she approves of his new look. He then invites the depressed Zangief to train with him, renewing the wrestler's spirit.

=== Gameplay ===
Rufus was purposefully made faster than his outward appearance would indicate and given the ability to string his attacks together more readily, in order to "[defy] expectations based on what he looks like", and to contrast against other large characters in fighting games. During development of his attacks, the developers devised several options for his fighting style, considering different ways to combine it with his appearance. After considering his design, they decided to allow his movements to be quick and strengthened by the inertia of his body fat, accompanied by martial artist yells and shouts.

Rufus's gameplay has been compared to the fighting styles used by Street Fighter III characters Yun and Yang by the development team, notably in regards to his diving kick attack, and emphasized mobility while attacking. Other attacks were designed as a means to negate enemy offensives, such as the Galactic Tornado, which destroys enemy projectiles while drawing the opponent closer to Rufus for a final strike. His Ultra Combo, Space Opera Symphony, is a barrage of attacks that requires close proximity to the opponent, dealing several blows and ending in a final upwards blast. In Super Street Fighter IV, a second Ultra Combo named "Big Bang Typhoon" was added, consisting of Rufus spinning his body with arms outward in a tornado-inspired fashion. The attack was designed to have deceptive range, but a long startup period. This in turn gave the development team trouble and relied on a lot of "trial and error" to balance the character.

=== In other media ===
In print media, Rufus appears in UDON Entertainment's Street Fighter comic series. First appearing in their Street Fighter II Turbo comic in February 2009, Rufus is shown to hate Ken for being named the best fighter in America as well as for the media attention he receives, feeling Ken put no effort into the achievement. Taking Candy along with him, Rufus sets out to find and defeat Ken at the story's conclusion. Later appearing in the second issue of UDON's Street Fighter IV comic book, Rufus attempts to find him through his friend Sakura Kasugano, defeating Dan Hibiki in the process but is himself defeated afterwards.

In the crossover comic Street Fighter X G.I. Joe by IDW Comics, Rufus appears as one of the participants at a tournament held by series villains M. Bison and Destro, with the tournament itself being a ploy to power the former's "psycho drive" with energy from the fighters. Reaching the semi-finals, Rufus is defeated by ninja Jinx, and afterwards the whole tournament is revealed to be rigged by the other fighters so she could proceed to the finals and defeat Bison. Rufus, enraged and feeling mocked, demands a match to determine the third place winner, only to be quickly knocked out, while the psycho drive is damaged and begins leaking energy. He nearly accepts his loss before seeing Candy flirt with another man, and re-enraged he absorbs the leaking energy to become "Psycho Rufus", a massive naked version of himself able to vomit up the residual energy as temporary hostile clones of various Street Fighter and G.I. Joe characters. The fighters combine forces to defeat him and he's restored to normal, taking the loss lightly with Candy beside him.

== Promotion and reception ==
To promote Street Fighter IV and the character, artwork of Rufus including hand-drawn sprites of the character is included in Xbox Live themes. Worldwide restaurants Wan Zhu Ji and Benitora Gyoza Bo offered four Street Fighter IV–themed meals, which included a nimono meat dish named after the character. At organized events, Capcom distributed a limited series of Street Fighter IV cards to promote the arcade title, one of which features Rufus in a fighting stance. Toy manufacturer NECA at one point considered making an action figure of the character, however due to the character's design they were unable to share elements from other figures to keep costs down, with general manager of product development Randy Falk stating, "He was just too big and round."

Rufus has received mixed to positive reception since his debut. Comic writer Aubrey Sitterson described him as one of her favorite characters in the entire franchise, due to "his insufferable narcissism, his Bruce Lee homage jumpsuit and his...questionable self-taught martial arts techniques". IGN described Rufus as one of the most interesting new characters introduced in Street Fighter IV, due to the "juxtaposition between his comical size and impressive speed" and added that his attack set "shows that if you can get past Rufus' comical exterior, a capable fighter hides within." GameTrailers praised the character and noted he "definitely offered something different", adding "You may not have expected a game's most obvious jiggle physics to apply to a male character." Describing him as a "personal favorite", Brian Bowers Stars and Stripes noted the level of detail in Rufus's animations and movements, saying "blubber undulates as he hefts his immense bulk back and forth, up and down in a gravity-defying display of power. It's weirdly awesome," and praised the character as a sign Street Fighter IV didn't take itself too seriously. Den of Geek described him as an "obnoxious delight", adding that the character didn't really come into his own until Street Fighter x Tekken due to his friendship with Zangief, calling their ending in the game "surprisingly inspiring (if you get to the post-credits narration)".

In contrast, Doug Buel of The Tampa Tribune considered Rufus a character the game could have done without, describing him as "an obnoxious, overweight fighter with a big mouth", additionally citing the character as the game's worst feature. GameSpot described him as "a bit of a sight gag", though noting his speed as "deceptive". A reviewer for the New Straits Times felt that though the character stood out from the other newcomers, his play was too "lethargic". Giant Bomb's Jeff Gerstmann noted that the character was "a bit out of place" with the rest of the cast, describing him as a "big, bobbing belly with appendages", though he added that Rufus was feasible as a playable character. Paul Disalvo of Game Rant named Rufus one of the worst character designs in fighting games, describing him as "incredibly unflattering to behold" and "a strictly worse alternative to the character of Bob from Tekken" going further to compare Bob's design as simplistic and endearing while Rufus' was "blatantly repulsive". Comic Book Resources complained that his hyper-verbal nature and running gag of confusing others for Ken tended to get annoying fast, and added that while his appearance in a future Street Fighter title may be seen as body positivity, his appearance serves "as more of a joke and deliberately designed to appear borderline grotesque to players".

=== In academic study ===
Damian Asling in a paper titled Japanese Culture – Journey to the West described Rufus as an example of "heta-uma", noting while he "may appear grotesque and ugly, the labour of design behind his production is evident in the final product, and as his play-'style' is one of grace and power", following the same dichotomy as more traditional looking character Ryu despite differing in presentation. In the book The Play Versus Story Divide in Game Studies, Nicholas Ware suggested Rufus was designed to play against the stereotypical visual type of a heavier, slow character in a fighting game, and unlike similarly designed characters his attacks were "quick, hit multiple times, and are based on controlling distance between himself and the other player, not closing it", further adding that for a character meant to be comical, the juxtaposition supported this aspect. In another paper, Nicholas added that Rufus was "the exception to the rule" of a character's appearance correlating to fighting style, and was Capcom's chance to bring something unexpected to their audience.

Described as a concept based on the idea "wouldn't a fat Bruce Lee be funny and gross", Todd Harper in a paper for the Journal of Electronic Gaming and Esports cited Rufus as an example of how prevalent overweight characters are in fighting games as a whole. Heavily criticizing the character's design as "bizarre and hyperexaggerated", he argued that it presented a joke at "fat people's expense", displaying visual and cultural language often associated with overweight characters in media for the benefit of humoring those that aren't themselves overweight. At the same time however they acknowledged that Rufus was also presented as a competent fighter, noting that there are very few characters even in the fighting game genre that move like Rufus does and that there was "a degree of amateurish showmanship to his" fighting technique. While they hoped to see better characters presented instead, Harper questioned too how much of the stereotype could be separated from Rufus' character to make him "good representation", and stated in comparison to similar characters in other games he presented a complicated approach to the subject and provided "the potential for resistant reading", but did not "actively reject or attempt to foreclose the tropes involved."
