= Balrog (Street Fighter) =

- Street Fighter character
- Balrog in Street Fighter x Tekken
- First appearance: Street Fighter II: The World Warrior (1991)
- Designed by: Akira "Akiman" Yasuda
- Voiced by: English: Joe Romersa (SFII: The Animated Movie, SFII V (Animaze dub)); Werner Richmond (SFII V (ADV dub)); Paul Dobson (animated series); Bob Carter (Street Fighter IV, Street Fighter X Tekken, Street Fighter V); Japanese: Jōji Nakata (Street Fighter II: The Animated Movie); Tomomichi Nishimura (Street Fighter II V); Kōichi Yamadera (Street Fighter Zero 3, Capcom vs. SNK series); Sōnosuke Nagashiro (SNK vs. Capcom); Satoshi Tsuruoka (Street Fighter IV, Street Fighter X Tekken, Street Fighter V); Shin-ichiro Miki (Real Battle on Film); Seiji Chihara (Japanese dub of Legend of Chun-Li)
- Portrayed by: Grand L. Bush (Street Fighter film, game); Michael Clarke Duncan (Legend of Chun-Li); 50 Cent (2026 film)

In-universe information
- Fighting style: Boxing
- Origin: United States
- Nationality: American

Balrog, known in Japan as Mike Bison (Japanese: マイク・バイソン, Hepburn: Maiku Baison), is a fictional character in Capcom's Street Fighter series. He made his first appearance in Street Fighter II: The World Warrior in 1991. In the series, he is a disgraced boxer and antagonist who works for M. Bison's organization, Shadaloo.

== Conception and development ==
Balrog is depicted as an African-American boxer wearing blue trunks with white trim and a torn white shirt under a blue tank top, wearing red boxing gloves and boxing shoes. In Japan, the character of Balrog is named M. Bison (with the letter being an initial for "Mike") after real-life boxer Mike Tyson. However, when the developers of Street Fighter II were working on the overseas versions, they rotated the names of three of the boss characters for the English localization (with the other two becoming M. Bison and Vega), fearing that naming the boxer character "Mike Bison" might be a legal liability. The story of Street Fighter 6 acknowledged this change within the context of its narrative, claiming that all three names were aliases that Shadaloo's leadership operated under to protect their true identities. Ironically, years later, Mike Tyson revealed that he was unaware of the character, but was honored by the homage. At 6 ft 5 in (1.96 m), Balrog is a tall and heavy built fighter. Balrog is simply known as Boxer for international tournaments.

A character named Mike, who was also a 6 ft 3.5 in (1.92 m) tall, extremely well-built African-American boxer, appears in the original Street Fighter. Although recognized as a separate character, Mike is considered to be a prototype of Balrog due to their similar names (when one considers Balrog's Japanese name of Mike Bison) and gameplay.

== Appearances ==
Balrog appears in Street Fighter II as one of the opponents, and would become a playable character in subsequent revisions of the game, beginning with Street Fighter II: Champion Edition. He is characterized as a bully or a ruffian who is a tough, aggressive and belligerent street-raised boxer seeking the "American Dream" and one of the "Four Devas" (Shitennou, "Four Heavenly Kings") of Shadaloo.

Balrog's next major appearance was in Street Fighter Alpha 3, where he was a sub-boss in the arcade version who faced certain characters. The boxer became playable after certain requirements were met; he was also playable via a secret code. He was made into a regular playable character in the arcade update and subsequent home versions and given his own in-game plot, home stage, and endings. This incarnation of Balrog also appears in Capcom vs. SNK and Capcom vs. SNK 2. He later appears in other Street Fighter games, such as Street Fighter IV, Street Fighter X Tekken, and Street Fighter V.

=== In other media ===
==== Live-action ====
In the 1994 live-action film version of Street Fighter, Balrog is portrayed by Grand L. Bush and is a supporting protagonist and the videographer in Chun-Li's news crew.

Balrog later appears in the 2009 film Street Fighter: The Legend of Chun-Li, portrayed by Michael Clarke Duncan.

Rapper and actor 50 Cent appeared as Balrog in the 2026 reboot.

==== Animation ====
Balrog appears in the film Street Fighter II: The Animated Movie, where he serves in a similar capacity to his role in the video game.

Balrog also appeared in the 1995 Street Fighter animated series.

== Reception ==
Balrog was voted 18th in Capcom's own popularity poll of 85 characters for the 15th anniversary of Street Fighter. IGN ranked Balrog at number 15 in their list of top Street Fighter characters in 2008, noting his similarities to Tyson as well as his role as one of boxing's representatives in fighting games. Tyson would become aware of Balrog's similarities in 2019, decades after his introduction, commenting that he felt honored that they made the impersonation.

Den of Geek compared his relationship to Bison to that of He-man characters Beast Man and Skeletor, in that he acts as a powerful but dumb henchman for a much stronger villain. They further lamented that his original storyline of causing Shadaloo's downfall was retconned, though praised his new role as Ed's surrogate father, and wished to see how it progressed.

== Bibliography ==
- Studio Bent Stuff (September 2000). All About Capcom Head-to-Head Fighting Game 1987-2000. A.A. Game History Series (Vol. 1) (in Japanese). Dempa Publications, Inc. ISBN 4-88554-676-1.
