= List of esports games =

Esports are competitive video games played in professional competitions and usually fall into a few major genres. The majority of esports titles are fighting games, first-person shooters (FPS), real-time strategy (RTS), traditional sports, and multiplayer online battle arena games (MOBA), with the MOBA genre being the most popular in terms of participation and viewership. The following is a selection of games that have had a professional scene, sorted by genre and ordered roughly chronologically.

== Action game genres ==
=== Fighting games ===
Fighting games were among the earliest games to be in tournaments, with the founding of what would become the Evolution Championship Series in 1999.

Competitions in the genre are generally individual competitions with both players providing input to the same machine. Though the genre originally focused on arcade play, it has gradually moved to console play. These series (being Street Fighter, Mortal Kombat, Marvel vs. Capcom, Tekken, Killer Instinct, and Super Smash Bros.) are amongst the fighting games played at a professional level. Important tournaments for the genre include the Evolution Championship Series and Capcom Cup. Tougeki – Super Battle Opera was a major tournament for several years.

Fighting game enthusiasts generally prefer the moniker "competitive gaming", and often eschew the term "esports", citing cultural differences between the predominantly PC-gaming esports communities and the older arcade-gaming community.

Members of the fighting game community are especially cognizant of their cc to the old arcade-era competitions, wishing to prioritize preserving the spirit of those competitions over simple monetization of fighting competitions.

==== Street Fighter ====
The Street Fighter has one of the earliest and longest running professional gaming scenes.

Professional Street Fighter players include Daigo Umehara, who had two of his matches included in a 2011 Kotaku list of "The 10 Best Moments in Pro-Gaming History". His early 1998 match against American player Alex Valle in Street Fighter Alpha 3 ranked sixth and his 2004 comeback against American player Justin Wong in Street Fighter III: Third Strike ranked first, while his 2009 grand finals match against Wong in Street Fighter IV at Evo 2009 was listed as having "[j]ust missed the cut".

==== Super Smash Bros. ====
Nintendo's Super Smash Bros. series has a large competitive community. While every title has been featured in high-profile tournaments, Super Smash Bros. Melee and Super Smash Bros. Ultimate are the most popular for high level competition as of 2018. Major League Gaming regularly sponsored Melee events from 2004 to 2007, before dropping it in favor for the 2008 sequel Super Smash Bros. Brawl. According to Major League Gaming, over 400 Super Smash Bros. Brawl competitive tournaments were held in 2010 in North America. Since then, Melee has again been periodically hosted at MLG events, with the latest being MLG 2015 World Finals. Super Smash Bros. for Wii U had an online contest sponsored by ESL. Other notable national tournaments to feature Smash games include Apex and Evolution Championship Series (EVO). At EVO 2019, Smash Ultimate became the largest Smash tournament ever with 3,534 entrants.

==== Marvel vs. Capcom ====
Marvel vs. Capcom (MvC) is a fighting game series developed by Capcom that features characters from Capcom games and Marvel comic book characters. The series was played at the Evolution Championship Series from 2000 until 2017.

==== Tekken ====
Namco's Tekken series is known as the lightning chess of fighting games, having a large player base in Asian countries. Over the years Tekken has been cited as the most technical among fighting games. Praised for its balance, strong basics, depth and one of the few fighting games to feature a real 3D design, it continues to be featured in various championships. The "Master cup" series of Japan, "Final round" series of U.S.A, "Strongstyle" series of U.S.A, "UT" championship series of Europe are a few examples of events that are, or started off as exclusive Tekken events, and still hold it as a main game. The "King of Iron Fist Tournament" is a Tekken only tournament hosted by Namco themselves. Apart from this, other shows such as "Tekken Crash", "Tekken Strike" are Tekken only shows held in South Korea on the esports channel "Nice Game T.V". Tekken has made it periodically into the Evo Championship series, and since 2013 has become a permanent part of the event. Although it has a lesser player-base in the west, it seems to be steadily rising. In the east it dominates the arcade scene today leaving other games of its genre miles behind.

==== Killer Instinct ====
The Killer Instinct series is a combo-heavy franchise created by Rare and currently maintained by Iron Galaxy Studios and Microsoft. The franchise' most-played game is the 2013 Killer Instinct reboot, with the platform of choice being Xbox One. A circuit for the game has been created called the Killer Instinct World Cup, with a second iteration ending in early 2017. Killer Instinct's best player is Jonathan "Rico Suave" Deleon, who currently holds the EVO and Killer Instinct World Cup titles.

In January 2017, Ultra Arcade enforced a ban on taunting and teabagging in major Killer Instinct tournaments which sparked controversy among the fighting game community with some stating that it is considered impossible to enforce due to certain players' playstyles.

=== First-person shooters ===
First person shooters focus on simulating a firefight from a first person perspective, and may be either individual or team based. Classic games include the PC game Team Fortress 2, which is featured in a few smaller leagues such as the ESEA League, RGL, United Gaming Clans, and European Team Fortress 2 League. Call of Duty and Halo competitions usually play their console editions.

==== Doom ====
Doom is a series of multiplayer 1v1 and free-for-all deathmatch games developed by id Software. Doom is notable for establishing the arena-style deathmatch format, and also was partially responsible for the first online FPS community through DWANGO, an online gaming service officially endorsed and partially worked on by id Software. People also played Doom deathmatch online through other BBS services. The Ultimate DOOM and Doom II, alongside Heretic, were played in the Deathmatch '95 tournament, sponsored by id Software, Microsoft, and DWANGO. This tournament, perhaps the first PC esports tournament of its kind, was played through the online DWANGO service. Finalists from the US and the UK were flown to Microsoft headquarters to compete in a LAN party format event, named Judgement Day. Dennis Fong, best known for his victory at the Red Annihilation tournament for Quake, won Judgement Day, marking his first entry into esports. Doom II was also played in Cyberathlete Professional League and QuakeCon tournaments.

Doom 3 featured a 1v1 mode which was played professionally at QuakeCon 2004, QuakeCon 2005, and CPL Winter 2004, but was ultimately replaced by Quake 4 and Painkiller.

==== Quake ====
Quake is a series 1v1 PC based games developed by id Software. In 1996, id released the original Quake, and launched QuakeCon. QuakeCon is an annual convention which hosts competitions for the series, and has become the largest LAN event in North America. The first offline Quake tournament, Red Annihilation took place in May 1997. The winner, Dennis Fong, going under the alias "Thresh", took home the prize of Quake co-creator John D. Carmack's own red Ferrari 328 GTS convertible.

Quake 4 supported a small professional scene, with a dozen professional players signed to a few professional teams and a number of players marketing themselves through other means. Tournament play for Quake 4 peaked around 2006, with the game included in tournaments such as the Electronic Sports World Cup, the World Series of Video Games before the league's demise, the World Cyber Games 2006, and KODE5. As of 2008, Quake 4 has fallen out of favor in competition for the previous game in the series, Quake III Arena.

Quake Live was released in 2010, primarily based on Quake III Arena. Quake Live was played in tournaments such as DreamHack, QuakeCon, and FaceIt. The popularity of the title declined after a couple years. In 2012, the last major tournament to host Quake competitions, the Intel Extreme Masters, decided to drop the title.

Quake Champions was opened for Closed Beta Test on April 6, 2017, it was thereafter released as Early Access within Steam's early access program on August 22. Bethesda announced the availability of a free-to-play trial at E3 2018 downloadable on Steam. Players who signed up during the free trial period got to keep playing for free after E3. During Quakecon 2018, it was announced that Quake Champions would be free-to-play and open to all players on August 10, 2018.

Competitions have been held at Dreamhack and on QuakeCon, at first in Duel, Sacrifice and also 2v2. In 2019 there was announced that a Quake Professional League (QPL) would start at QuakeCon the same Year and then would be running with four stages with a stage final after each stage and a big final at QuakeCon 2020. QuakeCon 2020 was however cancelled as a LAN-Event due to the COVID-19-Pandemic and the final was held online with players from Europe, CIS, North America, South America and Australia competing. During 2020 and 2021 the QPL is running every week and broadcastsmon Twitch.

==== Counter-Strike series ====
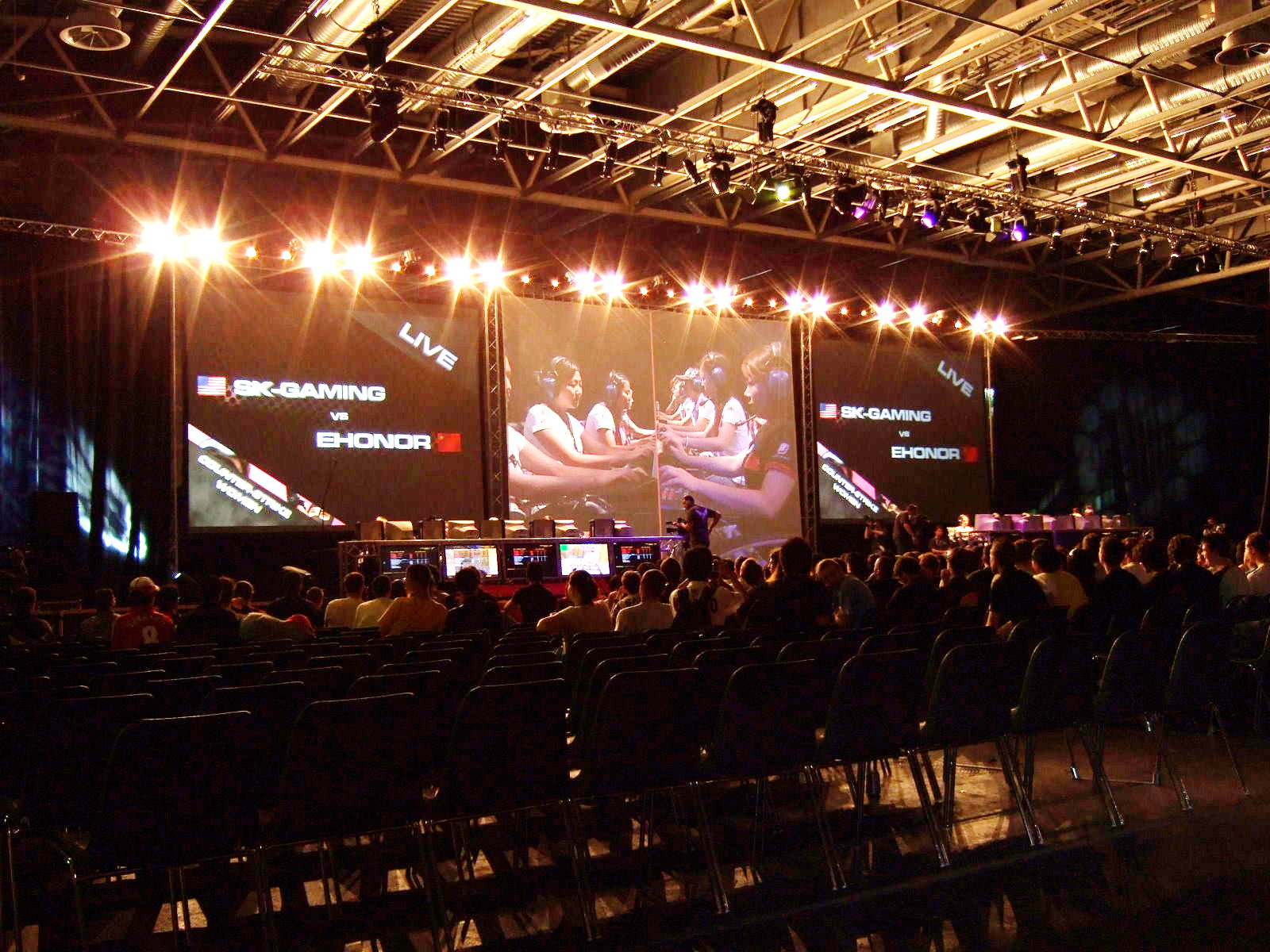
A Counter-Strike match in Electronic Sports World Cup 2007, Paris

The Counter-Strike series is a series of team based first person shooters which began as a Half-Life mod which was bought by Valve and released from beta in 2000. Professional competition is centered in North America and Europe in tournaments such as the World Cyber Games, CEVO, ESEA League, Intel Extreme Masters, Cyberathlete Professional League and the Electronic Sports League. The defunct league Championship Gaming Series franchised teams with contracted players who played Counter-Strike: Source.

Counter Strike is consistently at competitions such as DreamHack and World Cyber Games as the 1.6 version released in 2003, despite newer versions having been released by Valve over the years.

==== Call of Duty series ====
The Call of Duty series is a first-person shooter that has been played as an esport primarily in North America and is primarily played on PlayStation consoles, but was formerly played on Xbox. It has been featured in MLG tournaments ever since Call of Duty 4: Modern Warfare was introduced to the league in 2008. Tournaments usually have a large number of unknown teams competing to play with the top pro teams. A well known example is OpTic Gaming, and FaZe who have earned hundreds of thousands of dollars from competing in leagues and tournaments.

==== Unreal Tournament ====
Beginning with the release of the first game in 1998, the Unreal Tournament series of first person shooters supported competitions in the early 2000s, such as the series' inclusion the World Cyber Games from 2001 through 2004. There are no longer major tournaments for the series, as it has been dropped from leagues such as the Electronic Sports League.

==== Halo series ====
The Halo series has been featured in the American Major League Gaming since the release of Halo: Combat Evolved for the original Xbox. The series has also been played internationally, such as the European Console League's event in July 2010 in Liverpool. The Australian Cyber League hosted a Pro Circuit with tournaments in several major cities in Australia, including a January 2009 event in Brisbane. Partially due to changes to the series' design, Halo competitions have gone into steep decline that started in 2010 with the release of Halo: Reach, a drastic change from what was considered traditional Halo, as seen in the original three games. The decline had continued into late 2013–2014 where Halo 4 had been introduced and was an even bigger change to the series than Halo: Reach, and as a result had no major competitive events held, other than the Halo 4 World Championships, which was put on by developer 343 Industries as an early attempt to save Halo esports. 343 Industries later released Halo: The Master Chief Collection, re-releasing all 4 original titles in 60fps, but featuring a completely remastered version of Halo 2 to use as the primary game for halo esports. Although this was a good attempt by the developer to bring back the dying community, the game suffered from many bugs and glitches that made the game unplayable, which furthermore damaged that Halo esports community. At the same time around the release of Halo: the Master Chief Collection, 343 Industries introduced the Halo Championship Series as another attempt to re-establish Halo as a competitive esports title. As Halo declined, it was dropped from Major League Gaming, to be replaced by Call of Duty as the new staple game for the league. Currently Halo 5 is the newest game in the series and has entirely built around being competitive and well suited for esports, featuring vanilla competitive settings, a wide array of competitive game modes, and an in-depth spectator mode. 343 Industries is hosting the Halo World Championships, which will be a 4v4 competition, held in part with competitive leagues MLG, ESL, and Gfinity. The prize pool is currently 2 million dollars, which is crowd funded through Halo 5's in-game "REQ Pack" purchases. The game franchise's history in esports is currently focused at the Halo Championship Series (HCS) Pro League in conjunction with the ESL esports organization, with the first season finished up in mid-2016.

==== Painkiller ====
Painkiller is a 2004 game developed by Polish game studio People Can Fly and published by DreamCatcher Interactive. At the end of 2004 Painkiller was chosen by the Cyberathlete Professional League to be their official 2005 CPL World Tour game. This was slightly controversial with many esports followers and competitors due to the fact that other games had proven themselves at least as popular online multiplayer games. As the tour had already been announced as a one-on-one deathmatch format competition, Unreal Tournament 2004 and Doom 3 were also fan favourites for this tour. However, since Unreal Tournament 2004 developer Epic Games was in the process of changing publishers from Atari to Midway Games and could not guarantee their full support throughout the year-long tour, it was not chosen. An agreement between the CPL and DreamCatcher stipulated that no other organization was allowed to use Painkiller in a gaming competition with prizes above US$2,000. without obtaining a license from the CPL. For the 2006 CPL World Tour, Quake III Arena was selected as the one-versus-one deathmatch game, replacing Painkiller.

==== Battlefield series ====
Battlefield series games have been played in multiple tournaments. The PC version of the games are usually used. Electronic Sports League has sponsored Battlefield tournaments since Battlefield 2.

==== Crossfire ====
Crossfire is a Korean-developed shooter similar to Counter-Strike that is most popular in East Asia. Crossfire Stars is the name of the world championship event, founded in 2013.

==== Overwatch ====
Overwatch has attracted attention as an esports title including teams being picked up by professional teams. Blizzard Entertainment has founded an official Overwatch League for professional, salaried players.

==== Team Fortress 2 ====
Team Fortress 2 is a class-based shooter that has been played in several online leagues, notably ESEA League, RGL, UGC League, ETF2L, Ozfortress and Asiafortress in a 6vs6 format and a Highlander League 9vs9 format. The game has made appearances at DreamHack due to support from Razer Arena Team Fortress 2 has also held annual international LAN events at the Multiplay Insomnia Gaming Festival during the summer since 2012.

==== Rainbow Six: Siege ====
Tom Clancy's Rainbow Six Siege is the first esports game in the series. Official competitions of Rainbows Six Siege is Rainbow Six Pro League run by ESL and Ubisoft. Recently ESL hosted the Rainbow Six Siege ESL 2022 Six Invitational, in which Team SoloMid were crowned the winners.

==== Alliance of Valiant Arms ====
Alliance of Valiant Arms (A.V.A) was a first-person shooter most popular in Asia. Developer Aeria Games sponsored a world championship, and there were also some other independent offline events held. The game shut down in 2018, as well as its successor one year later.

==== Special Force II ====
Special Force II has the Special Force II Pro League in Taiwan run by the Taiwan esports League, as well as events organized by Electronic Sports League in Europe.

==== Valorant ====
Valorant is the TTP first-person shooter released by Riot Games in 2020. Currently the majority of Valorant events are organized by Riot. In 2025, Valorant was included in the Hero Esports Asian Champions League (ACL), which will be the only international tournament for the game in China in the first half of 2025.

=== Third-person shooters ===
==== Gears of War ====
The Gears of War series has been played competitively in organized esports events. In 2016, Xbox and The Coalition launched the Gears of War 4 Pro Circuit, featuring international open events operated by Major League Gaming and Gfinity with a starting prize pool of US$1 million.

==== Garena Free Fire ====
Garena Free Fire is a mobile battle royale game published by Garena. Its professional esports circuit is centered on the Free Fire World Series (FFWS), with regional competitions feeding into international events. In 2026, the circuit included Free Fire at the Esports World Cup and a 24-team FFWS Global Finals in Bangkok.

==== PlayerUnknown's Battlegrounds (PUBG) ====
PUBG: Battlegrounds is a battle royale game developed by Krafton. Its professional esports circuit includes regional competitions and the PUBG Global Series, with qualification leading to the annual PUBG Global Championship. In 2026, the Global Series comprised 12 events across four circuits, while the PUBG Global Championship was scheduled to feature 32 teams.

==== Splatoon ====
Splatoon 2 is an online multiplayer third-person shooter developed and published by Nintendo. Official tournaments have been hosted and streamed on YouTube by Nintendo since 2017 until 2020. Official tournaments have included players from Japan, North America, Europe, Australia and New Zealand. There is also an active non-official online community which hosts tournaments across the world, a notable host being LUTI (Leagues Under the Ink). Competition has since shifted to Splatoon 3 since its launch in 2022, including both official tournaments from Nintendo and unofficial community-run tournaments.

== Strategy game genres ==
=== Real-time strategy ===
Competitions involving traditional real time strategy games generally feature individual competitors competing on personal computers over a local area network or the internet. While not nearly as popular as other RTS games during this period, the Age of Empires series was played competitively as well, and was part of the World Cyber Games from 2000 to 2003, and 2007–2008.

==== StarCraft ====
StarCraft was used at several tournaments including the Professional Gamers League. However, its expansion pack StarCraft: Brood War was far more popular than the original.

StarCraft: Brood War was foundational in the establishment of esports, and along with StarCraft II, remains among the most popular series in competitive gaming. StarCraft competitions did especially well in South Korea, which remains central to the competitive scene as a whole. Professionals in Korea achieved a status similar to professional athletes. In the west, StarCraft enjoyed significantly less competitive popularity. StarCraft was the very first game to have been accepted into the World Cyber Games tournament, and had a tournament at their events every year until it was replaced by StarCraft II in 2011. In Korea, prominent StarCraft competitions included the Ongamenet Starleague, the MBCGame StarCraft League, and Proleague. Finals for these league attracted tens of thousands of fans, and became very popular on Korean cable TV.

==== StarCraft II ====
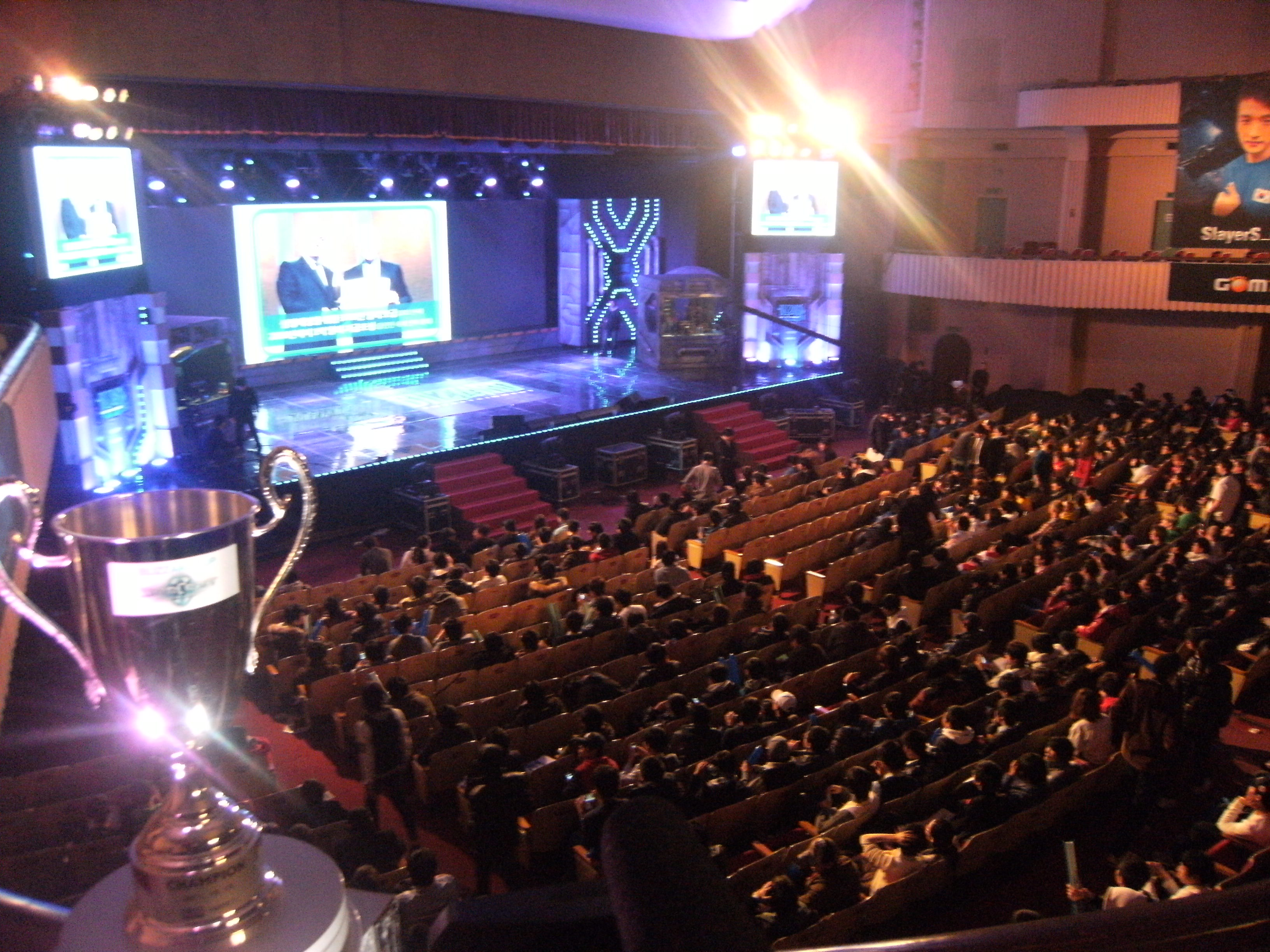
The 2011 GSL championship at BlizzCon.

After its release in 2010, StarCraft II competitions gradually replaced the prior Brood War competitions. For example, StarCraft II has replaced the original game in the WCG, and the initially Brood War-focused Proleague mixed StarCraft II into their competitions, before finally phasing out Brood War entirely. Initially, disagreements between Blizzard and Kespa prevented many players in Korea from moving to StarCraft II, but conditions improved, and were ultimately resolved by 2012.

Many leagues and esports organizations in Korea and across the world host StarCraft II tournaments, including the Team Liquid StarLeague, Major League Gaming, North American Star League, DreamHack, the Intel Extreme Masters and the GOMTV Global Starcraft II League.

In 2012, Blizzard Entertainment created the StarCraft II World Championship Series. In the tournament's initial 2012 season, Korean player PartinG beat Creator to win the $100,000 grand prize. As of 2013, the WCS system divides players into three leagues: WCS Korea, WCS Europe, and WCS North America. Players earn points based on their performance in many different tournaments, including the ones mentioned above, and the 16 players with the most points advance to world championship at BlizzCon. In the 2013 grand finals, sOs beat the crowd favorite Jaedong 4–1, winning the $100,000 grand prize. The 2nd-place finish for Jaedong awarded him $45,000, making his total prizepool earnings $489,384.83, the highest of any esports player at that time.

==== Warcraft III ====
Warcraft III has been played professionally all around the world, especially in South Korea, China, France, and Germany. Although the game never achieved the same competitive popularity of the original StarCraft, the game supported a few dozen professional teams. The game lacks a singular world championship, as there have been numerous large tournaments. Events have been organized by Blizzard Entertainment, have also been televised Korean leagues, and large tournaments have been held in China. Chinese players generally have used their own clients for online competition, due to a poor connection to the outside world. Notable Warcraft III players include: Xiaofeng "Sky" Li, Dae Hui "FoV" Cho, Jang "Moon" Jae Ho, Fredrik "MaDFroG" Johansson and Manuel "Grubby" Schenkhuizen. In more recent times, Warcraft III competition has declined in popularity. Many professional Warcraft III players have since moved to Starcraft II, including Grubby and Moon. Despite this, Warcraft III continues to be played competitively, still appearing in events such as WCG 2013.

=== Multiplayer online battle arena ===
Multiplayer online battle arena (MOBA) games are historically a spin-off of real-time strategy games, but are different enough that they are now generally considered a separate genre. While traditional RTS games feature many units controlled by a single player, MOBAs are typically team focused, the model being five players on a team, each controlling a single "hero" unit. MOBAs are generally played on personal computers.

==== League of Legends ====
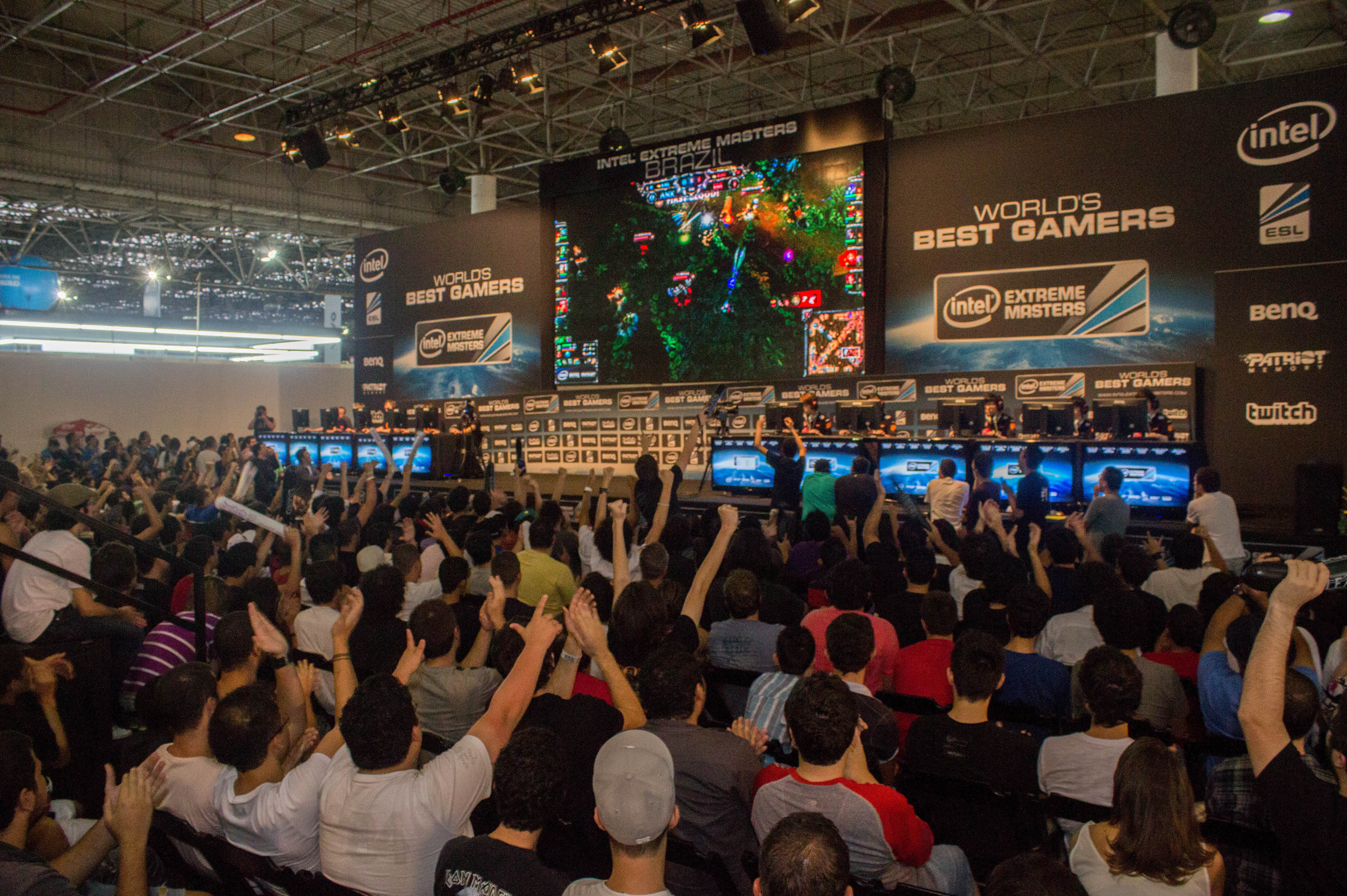
A match at Final Intel Extreme Masters World Best Gamers League Of Legends in Brazil

League of Legends (LoL) is a multiplayer online battle arena video game developed and published by Riot Games, primarily inspired by Defense of the Ancients. It was released on October 27, 2009. In an early LoL tournament, the game was featured as a promotional title in the 2010 World Cyber Games in Los Angeles. The victors were the Counter Logic Gaming team from North America, winning a $7,000 prize. LoL was added to the Intel Extreme Masters lineup for the 2011 Electronic Sports League season. The Season 1 World Championships were held at DreamHack Summer 2011 in Sweden. The European team Fnatic defeated teams from Europe and the US to win US$50,000 of the tournament's US$100,000 prize pool. According to Riot, the final match drew 210,000 concurrent viewers.

Riot announced a prize pool of US$5 million to be paid out over Season 2, allocated to tournaments featuring League of Legends. the Season 2 World Championship featured a prize pool of US$2 million. Taipei Assassins of Taiwan defeated Azubu Frost of South Korea in the grand finals, winning the $1 million grand prize. During the quarterfinal match against Team Solomid, Azubu Frost player Woong looked at the spectator minimap, resulting in a fine that reduced their winnings by US$30,000. The League of Legends Season 2 World Finals match drew a peak of 1.1 million concurrent viewers, who observed the matches from Internet streams, Korean television, and Chinese television.

In season 3, the total prize pool was US$8 million. The 2013 Season 3 Championships was held in Los Angeles, featuring a prize pool is $2 million with $1 million for first place. The team SKT T1 won the final, which took place at the Staples Centre on October 4. The event drew 1.4 million concurrent viewers during the final series.

==== Dota 2 ====
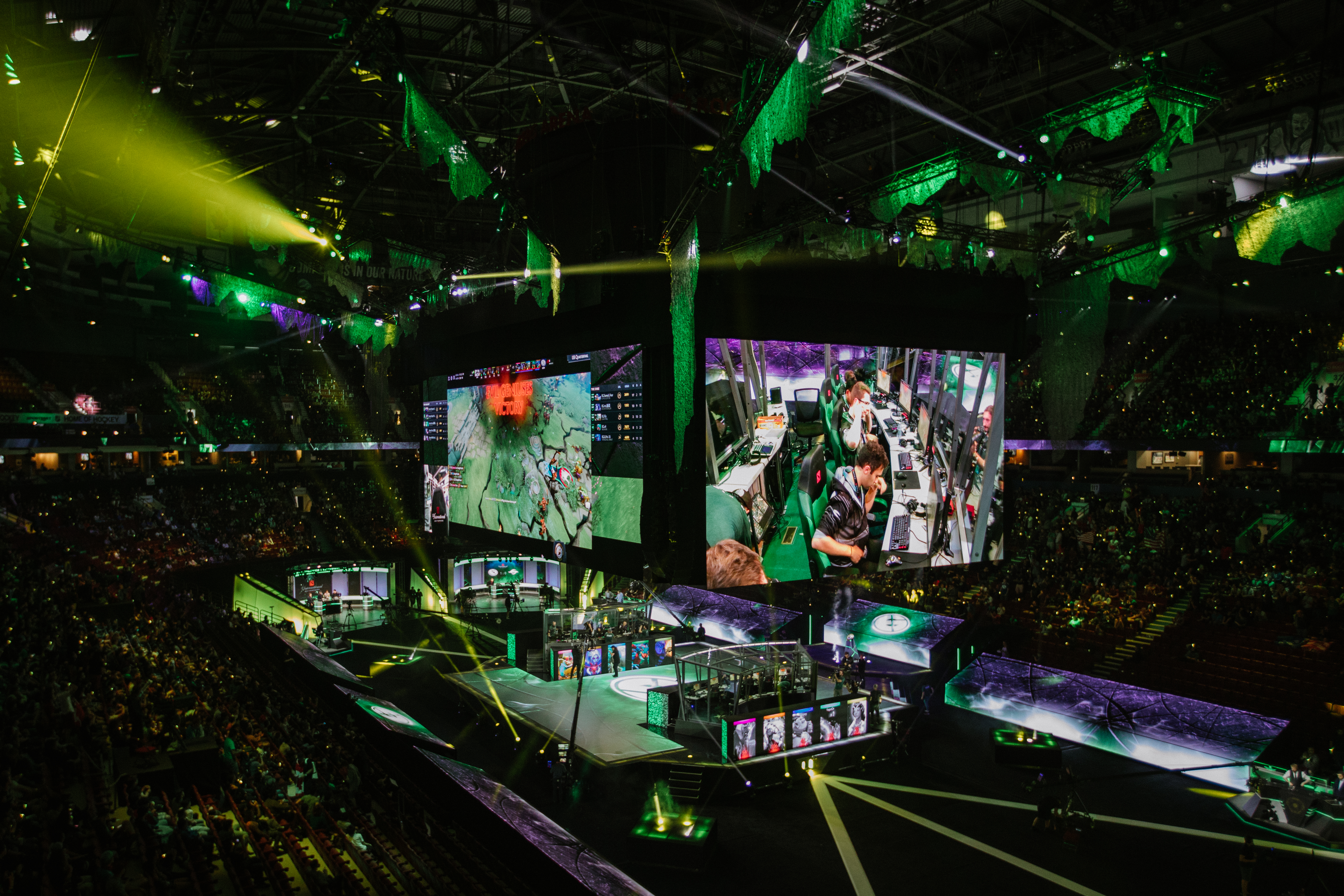
A match at The International 2018 at the Rogers Arena in Vancouver

To ensure that enough Defense of the Ancients players would take up Dota 2 and to promote the game to a new audience, Valve invited sixteen accomplished Defense of the Ancients esports teams to compete at a Dota 2-specific tournament at Gamescom in August 2011, which later became an annually held event known as The International. From The International 2013 onward, its prize pool began to be crowdfunded through a type of in-game battle pass called the "Compendium", which raises money from players buying them and connected lootboxes to get exclusive in-game cosmetics and other bonuses offered through them. 25% of all the revenue made from Compendiums go directly to the prize pool, with sales from the 2013 battle pass raising over US$2.8 million, which made it the largest prize pool in esports history at the time. Each iteration of The International since then has surpassed the previous one's prize pool, with the most recent one, The International 2019, having one at over $34 million.

By the end of 2011, Dota 2 was already one of the highest-paying esport games, second only to StarCraft II. At E3 2013, South Korean company Nexon announced the investment of ₩2 billion (approximately US$1.7 million) into local leagues in the country, which coincided with their distribution partnership with Valve for the game. In February 2015, Valve sponsored Dota 2 Asia Championships was held in Shanghai with a prize pool of over $3 million, raised through compendium sales. Since then, other Dota 2 Asia Championships have taken place, with it being sometimes being referred to as the "Chinese International". In total, professional Dota 2 tournaments had earned teams and players over $100 million by June 2017, with over half of that being awarded at the International tournaments, making it the highest earning esport game by a margin of nearly $60 million.

Dota 2's influence in the Southeast Asia (SEA) region has been steadily growing, with key events marking its progress. The Manila Major in 2016, the first Major held in SEA, was a turning point, showcasing the region's passion for esports. Moving ahead to 2023, the region's enthusiasm for the game is further emphasized with the introduction of the Bali Major. These events not only highlight the growth of Dota 2 in SEA but also its significant impact on the global esports scene.

==== Smite ====
Smite is a third-person MOBA developed and published by Hi-Rez Studios. Prior to release, Smite was kept in an extended beta that resulted in over 74 million hours of playtime and the realization of a robust competitive community. Throughout the beta, Hi-Rez hosted a series of LAN and online events with cash prize pools. Smite was officially released in North America and western Europe on March 25, 2014.

The weekend following its release, Hi-Rez hosted a Smite Launch Tournament in Atlanta where the eight best teams from Europe and North America played for a prize pool of over US$200,000, half of which was raised by the community from sales of a character skin. Team Solo Mid from Europe won first place, with Team Dignitas from North America taking second place. Viewers at home could make their own predictions for a chance to win various prizes. According to Hi-Rez, the event drew more than 400,000 unique viewers worldwide. After the event, Hi-Rez added a custom-branded skin in honor of Team Solo Mid's victory.

In May 2014, Hi-Rez announced the Smite World Championship Series (SWC). The SWC began with three months of regional qualifiers, which culminated into two separate US$50,000 regional LAN events for Europe and North America. The SWC took place on January 9–11, 2015 at the Cobb Energy Performing Arts Centre in Atlanta, and featured a prize pool of US$2,612,260, raised from the community through the sale of digital cosmetics and special edition items. The World Championship featured teams from North America, Europe, China, Brazil, and Latin America. After several matches, the North American team COGnitive Prime (Now Cloud9 G2A) took 1st place earning US$1,306,130, with Titan, a European team who began their run to the SMITE World Championship in the open amateur scene, coming in second place. Afterwards, much like the Smite Launch Tournament, a branded cosmetic skin was released to honor COGnitive Prime and an invitational competition scheduled in their name.

==== Heroes of the Storm ====
Heroes of the Storm is crossover multiplayer online battle arena game, developed and published by Blizzard Entertainment, released on June 2, 2015. Heroes Global Championship (HGC) was main esports event in 2017 and 2018, until Blizzard's cancellation of all its plans for tournaments in 2019. However, Tespa Collegiate series continued to support Heroes of the Storm competitive scene.

==== Vainglory ====
Vainglory is a multiplayer online battle arena released for iOS and then released for Android, Microsoft Windows, and macOS. Developed and published by Super Evil Megacorp (SEMC), Vainglory has attracted some interest as an esports game, including the sponsorship of a team by SK Gaming. It boasted the largest prize money awarded for a mobile game with $350,000 from tournaments around the world in Fall 2015.

==== Arena of Valor ====
Arena of Valor (AoV) is a multiplayer online battle arena developed by TiMi Studios and published by Tencent Games for Android, iOS and Nintendo Switch. The game first released on October 14, 2016.

Arena of Valor tournaments have been held in numerous regions, with each region having their own local leagues such as Garena Challenger Series Pro League (GCS) in Taiwan, Realm of Valor Pro League (RPL) in Thailand, Arena of Glory (AOG) in Vietnam, Arena of Valor Star League (ASL) in Indonesia, Arena of Valor: Valor Cup (AVC) in Malaysia, Singapore and Philippines, Arena of Valor: Valor Series (AVS) in Europe, North America, and Latin America, and Arena of Valor Japan League (AJL) in Japan.

Arena of Valor also has two annual world championship tournaments; Arena of Valor International Championship (AIC) and Arena of Valor World Cup (AWC). AIC is a tournament where teams from across the world participate to earn profit and glory for their own esport organisation, while AWC is a tournament where teams participate under the banner of their national flag to represent their own country.

The first AIC was held in South Korea from November 23 to November 26, 2017. The event attracted more than 36,000,000 online viewers, breaking mobile game records worldwide and has since become the leading standard of mobile eSports. The game occupying the top positions of mobile game rankings in Asia for months has also received the honor of Google Play's Best of 2017 Game award in Europe. The second AIC tournament was held in Thailand from November 23 to December 16, 2018. The tournament increased the number of competing teams to 16, with teams competing for the title and a proportion of the prize pool worth $600,000 (£460,000). The third AIC tournament was also held in Thailand from November 5 to November 24, 2019. It featured an additional all-new 1v1 competition, where one player represents each team and the winner walking away with $5,000.

The first Arena of Valor World Cup (AWC) tournament was held in Los Angeles, United States, from July 17 to July 28, 2018. A total prize pool of $500,000 made AWC one of the largest mobile eSports tournaments in gaming history. A total of nine regions competed for the grand prize, which includes Taiwan - Hong Kong - Macau, Thailand, Vietnam, Malaysia - Singapore - Philippines, Indonesia, South Korea, North America, Latin America and Europe. Additionally, the tournament host selected three Wildcard teams to participate in AWC. The second AWC tournament was held in Danang, Vietnam, from June 27 to July 14, 2019, with the same total prize pool of $500,000. The second AWC also marks Japan's first participation in an AOV international tournament since the game introduced their Japanese server on November 30, 2018.

The third Arena of Valor World Cup for 2020 was canceled due to COVID-19 pandemic.

==== Mobile Legends: Bang Bang ====
Mobile Legends: Bang Bang is a mobile multiplayer online battle arena developed and published by Moonton. The game hosted its MSC 2019 (MLBB Southeast Asia Cup 2019) with a total prize pool of US$120,000 featuring 12 teams from Indonesia, Malaysia, Singapore, Myanmar, Philippines, Laos, Thailand, Cambodia, and Vietnam. The world scene tournament was dubbed as M1 2019 (MLBB World Championship 2019), consist of 16 teams from 14 countries with a prize pool of US$250,000 and was held at Axiata Arena in Kuala Lumpur, Malaysia.

== Simulation game genres ==
=== Sports games ===
==== FIFA series ====
FIFA Football a generally individual competition available on consoles as well as PCs. FIFA has been an official game of the World Cyber Games since its first tournament in 2001. In 2003, a FIFA tournament was also held at the first event of CPL Europe. Germany has the biggest FIFA Football community, hosting leagues such as the Electronic Sports League and the World League eSport Bundesliga (which was aired on the national TV-broadcaster Deutsches Sportfernsehen before the league's cessation). There are also leagues in South Korea like the Ongamenet FifaLeague that are televised. The ESL continues to host FIFA competitions into 2013, as does the ESWC.

Furthermore, the FIFA Interactive World Cup (FIWC) is the world's largest video game tournament and with that the biggest FIFA tournament there is. The virtual football world championship is organised annually by FIFA and its presenting partner EA Sports. The inaugural FIWC took place in Zurich in 2004 and since then enabled millions of football fans from all around the world to fight for the world champion title. The tournament is played on the latest console generations of Xbox and PlayStation.

==== Madden ====
The Madden NFL series of American football games has been used as esports. Game developer Electronic Arts sponsored a $1 million Madden NFL 17 Championship Series. The reality television series Madden Nation was created as a joint effort between EA Sports and ESPN Original Entertainment and focused on the competitive scene of Madden.

==== NBA 2K ====
In February 2017, the National Basketball Association, in conjunction with Take-Two Interactive, announced the creation of an esports league centering on the NBA 2K franchise called the NBA 2K League. It began play in 2018.

==== Pro Evolution Soccer ====
PES League is the official competition series of Pro Evolution Soccer run by Konami. In 2016 and 2017, the PES League final competition was held together with UEFA Champions League finals.

==== Rocket League ====
Rocket League is a popular vehicular soccer video game. It is described as "soccer, but with rocket-powered battle cars" or "soccar". Competitions have been run by Twitch, Psyonix Studios, ESL and Major League Gaming as well as other independent tournaments. The central competitive circuit of Rocket League, sponsored by Psyonix Studios, is called the RLCS, short for Rocket League Championship Series. It is held throughout the duration of the year from October to August, with the most recent champions being NRG Esports. There are several other smaller tournaments, but the RLCS remains the most prestigious event for Rocket League esports

=== Racing ===
==== Formula 1 official games ====
The Formula One official games, currently being developed by Codemasters, has hosted many series, some of which are officially endorsed by Formula One, such as the Formula One Esports Series and Virtual Grand Prix, a series of races involving several real-life motorsport racers and global celebrities created to substitute the cancelled Formula One Grands Prix during the COVID-19 pandemic.

==== Gran Turismo Sport ====
Fédération Internationale de l'Automobile officially endorses an annual FIA Gran Turismo Championship, consisting of two series throughout the year since 2018, and are viewed via YouTube livestreams from the official GRAN TURISMO TV channel. The two series compromise of a Nations Cup, where drivers will represent each own's country, and the Manufacturers Series, where drivers will race for and represent their selected manufacturer; participants will also have to use the "Sport" mode within the game during these events. The winner of each series are given $1 options or US$160,000 in winning Manufacturers, a TAG Heuer watch, and a glass plaque, and are also honoured at the FIA Prize Giving Ceremony. The tournament also allows the audience to join in by rooting for their country. If the driver wins, the players of their country receive a "victory bonus". The tournament itself has been considered a success.

==== iRacing ====
NASCAR hosts an affiliated annual video game competition since 2010 known as the NASCAR iRacing.com World Championship Series, which had a grand prize of US$10,500 in 2011.

==== Trackmania ====
Trackmania has had a competitive scene since 2006, when Trackmania Nations ESWC was released for ESWC 2006. Between 2006 and 2020, the game's prize pools consistently dwindled although the game continued to draw crowds at live events such as the ZrT cup and ESWC. Since 2020, when the series' most recent iteration, Trackmania, was released, the esports scene has seen a revitalization with the debut of the developer organized Trackmania Grand League. The Grand League consists of three tiers of play and it runs two seasons each year with the Trackmania Grand League World Cup run in the offseason.

The competitive circuit saw a significant evolution with the announcement of the Trackmania World Tour 2025, which features a return to the 2v2 team format. This tour is open to both amateur and professional teams globally, allowing participation in a structured series of official and community-organized "homologated" tournaments. The season is divided into two four-month stages (April-July and July-October). Teams compete within three regions: EMEA (Europe, Middle East & Africa), NCSA (North Central South America), and APAC (Asia & Pacific), earning points in regional rankings based on their performance in homologated tournaments. At the end of each stage, top regional teams qualify for Global Playoffs. The season culminates in the Trackmania World Cup 2025 in Fall 2025, where the best teams from the season will compete for the world championship title. Tournament organizers can contribute to the tour by getting their events homologated to distribute ranking points.

==== Project CARS ====
Project CARS has become an official esport with the Electronic Sports League and has become a success.

==== rFactor 2 ====
rFactor 2 had hosted the Formula E Race at Home Challenge, which was involving Formula E drivers, as well as several pro eSports players. The virtual tournament was broadcast on various Formula E social channels along with selected television partners.

=== Deck-building card games ===
==== Hearthstone ====
Hearthstone is a digital collectible card game from Blizzard Entertainment. It has gained popularity as an esport with MLG and BlizzCon hosting tournaments.

==== Shadowverse ====
Shadowverse is a digital collectible card game by Cygames released in 2016. Cygame along with Avex Inc. hosts seasonal esport tournaments for the game, including annual World Grand Prix. The game also has its own pro league.

==== Magic: The Gathering Arena ====
Magic: The Gathering Arena is a digital adaptation of Magic: The Gathering card game, published by Wizards of the Coast. Tabletop Magic has developed competitive scheme and scene of its own, such as Pro Tour and World Championship since 1994. In December 2018 Wizards of the Coast announced that an esports pool would be created for the game for 2019. The $10 million prize pool will be equally divided between the traditional tabletop game and the new digital version Arena. In 2019, Wizards of the Coast unveiled a new esports program which started with a special Mythic Invitational event and a $1 million prize pool.

In 2021, discontinuation of professional Magic league was announced.

== Puzzle games ==
=== Puyo Puyo ===
Puyo Puyo was approved as an esports game by the Japanese esports Union in March 2018. The first esports tournament for the game was held during Sega Fest 2018 from April 14 to April 15 of the same year.

In September 2024, Sega announced the Puyo Puyo GLOBAL RANKING SERIES, a series of Puyo Puyo Tetris 2 tournaments (Note: Only the Puyo Puyo gameplay style was allowed in these tournaments.) with the aim of expanding competitive Puyo Puyo outside of Japan. The winner of the series would get a paid trip to Japan to participate in the Puyo Puyo Grand Prix Final, which is a Puyo Puyo esport tournament licensed by Sega; as well as a cash prize and a uniform. This is notable as it is the first set of events where players outside of Japan could compete in Sega's esport tournaments.

The following year, Sega announced the Puyo Puyo GLOBAL RANKING SERIES 2025. This expands upon the previous format by awarding "Global Points" based upon how well players perform on three types of tournaments. The first type involves four tournaments hosted and ran by Sega. The second type are four tournaments hosted and ran by Ascension, an international Puyo Puyo community. The last type are tournaments ran by overseas communities. The rankings are made of two divisions based on if the player is in Japan ("Japan Region") or not ("Other Region"). The top 2 players in Japan will be invited to the Puyo Puyo Grand Prix Final; while the top twelve players outside of Japan compete in one last tournament, where the top two winners will be invited to the Puyo Puyo Grand Prix Final. Both Sega and Ascension tournaments are ran on the Steam version of Puyo Puyo Tetris 2, while community tournaments are ran on the Switch or Steam versions of either Puyo Puyo Tetris 2 or Puyo Puyo Champions.

=== Tetris ===
There is a Classic Tetris World Championship for the puzzle game Tetris.

== Others ==
=== Pokémon ===
The Pokémon series of turn-based strategy video games are played competitively. A Pokémon Company-sponsored world championship organized by their Play! Pokémon division has been held annually for several years. These championships host games based on the mainline series of video games, as well as the Pokémon Trading Card Game.

=== War Thunder ===
War Thunder (WT) is a cross-platform MMO combat game for PC, PS4, Mac and Linux, dedicated to military aviation, armoured vehicles, and fleets developed by Gaijin Entertainment that was first released in 2012. War Thunder held the first season of its Thunder League tournament in late 2015. The tournament prize fund was directly funded by the players of game through the purchase of special in game goods, with the final prize pool reaching a sum of $57,425 distributed between 6 teams.

=== World of Tanks ===
World of Tanks (WoT) is an MMO tank game for PC developed by Wargaming that was first released in 2010. Since 2012, the company has been heavily invested in the WoT esports scene. There was an annual world championship with qualifier tournaments held across the world that stopped at 2018. The Electronic Sports League also sponsored some WoT tournaments until 2018.

=== World of Warcraft ===
Blizzard's MMO World of Warcraft added PvP features to the game after its release, and was received enthusiastically as an eSport. The game was generally phased out of MLG between 2010 and 2011, but Blizzard continues to hold the World of Warcraft Arena Global Invitational annually. The prize pool for the 2013 World of Warcraft Arena Global Invitational totaled over $180,000 and that of the 2014 World of Warcraft Arena Invitational World Championship totaled $250,000.

=== Clash Royale ===
Supercell's Clash Royale is a freemium, real-time strategy game that incorporates elements of collectible card games, tower defense, and multiplayer online battle arena. Developed for mobile devices with a free-to-play, pay-to-win pricing strategy, the game has appeal to those without competitive gaming set ups. Despite allowing users to pay to advance their account, competitive tournaments operate at "tournament level" to facilitate an even playing field. The game allows anyone to advance from an in game public tournament all the way to the world finals. Prizes of $1,000,000 and $400,000 have been awarded to winners of past competitions.

=== Clash of Clans ===
Supercell's Clash of Clans is a freemium, tower defense game in which players deploy troops to attack enemy defenses. Developed for mobile devices with a free-to-play, pay-to-win pricing strategy, the game has appeal to those without competitive gaming setups. COC tournaments have been recorded to have up to 30 gems in prize money. The game also features a boat. This boat, when pressed by the player's finger (or mouse, if run on a PC via an emulator such as BlueStacks) it takes the player to the Builder Village.

=== Microsoft Excel ===
Microsoft's Excel is a proprietary spreadsheet program that was adapted for esports use in the Excel World Championship, in which contestants (most of whom are in the mathematics and financial services industries that rely on spreadsheets as part of their jobs) need to solve a series of "cases" within a set time frame. The Excel World Championship was televised on ESPN2 as part of the network's ESPN8 The Ocho block of unusual competitive programming beginning in 2022.

=== Geoguessr ===
Geoguessr is a browser-based geography game in which players try to identify locations from Google Street View. The first GeoGuessr World Cup was held on October 13 and 14, 2023 and was livestreamed on Twitch and Youtube.

=== Magic Chess: Go Go ===
Magic Chess: Go Go is a mobile auto battler developed by Moonton. The game has developed an international esports scene, including the Magic Chess: Go Go Rising Stars qualification system, which has served as an open in-game qualifier for international competition.

Its inaugural GO1 World Championship was held in Jakarta in January 2026, with a US$25,000 prize pool and competitors from the game's international competitive circuit. The game was also featured as a demonstration esports event at the 2025 SEA Games.

== See also ==
- List of video game genres
- Mind sport
- Video games notable for speedrunning
