= Raptr =

Social-networking website and instant messenger

- Website type: Social networking
- Available in: English
- Dissolved: September 30, 2017; 9 years ago
- Creator: Dennis Fong
- Industry: Video game industry
- Website: raptr.com (Formerly)
- Commercial: Yes
- Registration: Required
- Users: 22 million (March 2014)
- Launched: September 3, 2008; 18 years ago
- Current status: Inactive

Raptr was a social-networking website and instant messenger developed by Raptr, Inc. intended for use by video game players. Dennis Fong, co-founder of Xfire, founded the company Raptr, Inc. in 2007; it is located in Mountain View, California. The company raised 12 million dollars in funding from investors including Accel Partners and Founders Fund. The service was shut down on September 30, 2017.

== Software ==
The client, which was a downloadable application for Microsoft Windows, supports Yahoo! Instant Messenger, GTalk, Windows Live Messenger, Xfire, ICQ, and Facebook Chat protocols and allows users to import their Xbox Live, PlayStation Network, and Steam accounts. It also included other features such as game/achievements tracking, in-game overlay, and game management. Raptr offers a few images showing a user's game statistics for use in signatures.

Screenshot of the Raptr client interface which a user can download.

On the website, users added video games to their profile, as well as track game play time and achievements, share reviews, game related information, and game activity. Raptr let users publish their gaming accomplishments to sites like Twitter, Plurk, FriendFeed, and Facebook.

One of the main features was Raptr rewards, a program where users earn a currency, called Raptr points, while playing or gaining achievements, those points could be exchanged for various rewards such as in-game items, avatars, new games, etc. In February 2014, AMD invested in Raptr, which improved the reward system, allowing users to earn points for optimizing their games with the app and added discounts and giveaways for real hardware.

Raptr launched in a closed beta on February 2, 2008, and launched an open beta to the public on September 3, 2008.

Raptr had partnerships with video game publishers Activision & Ijji, and the Raptr client was bundled with the PC release of Red Faction: Guerrilla. In December 2009, Raptr partnered with GameSpot to provide both communities with extra features.

In 2014, Raptr rebooted its business plan to focus on PC gamers. Dennis Fong stated "the biggest pain point for PC gamers is the weakness of the platform as a whole. Everybody has a different kind of PC. There are a million different configurations for playing games. We help gamers get the best experience every time they play” and adding "we have reinvented ourselves with a focus on PC gaming". Raptr then teamed up with AMD to promote optimization of games on AMD graphics cards. Raptr also partnered with Twitch to provide 'one-click' streaming in their desktop app. In 2015, Raptr announced an end for console support, citing the growing PC market and changes to Xbox Live and PlayStation Network which created difficulties in updating features.

In March 2015, Raptr launched Plays.tv, a gaming video clip sharing service. The service spun off into an independent company in January 2017.

On October 12, 2016, AMD discontinued the AMD Gaming Evolved App developed with the Raptr team, ending their collaboration. However, the software is still available for download.

On April 4, 2017, it was announced that the Raptr rewards service would be closed on the 30th of that month, because the partnership with AMD was over.

In the same year, on September 1, an announcement was posted on the site stating that it would be shutting down on September 30, 2017. However, users were still able to download their tracked time before that date. In July 2018, only a "Goodbye Raptr" page was left on the site. The site currently redirects to the wallpapers.com page for Ford Raptor wallpapers.

== See also ==
- Playfire
- GamerDNA
- Overwolf
