= Umehara ga kimeta =

2003 viral video from Japan

Umehara ga kimeta at the 2003 Tougeki – Super Battle Opera (SBO 03)
- Venue: Makuhari Messe
- Location: Chiba, Japan
- Date: 23 March 2003
- Competitors: 5,823
- Teams: 1,941

Umehara ga kimeta or Crazy Live Commentary (Japanese: 電波実況, romanized: Denpa Jikkyou) was live commentary in response to a match by video-game player Daigo Umehara at a national fighting game tournament in Japan in 2003. In 2007, a 17-second video clip of "Crazy Live Commentary" was posted on a video-sharing website. The commentary became a popular video, with millions of views. "Crazy Live Commentary" videos became standard material for mashups (videos remixed by individuals), and hundreds of mashups using "Crazy Live Commentary" were posted and shared. "Crazy Live Commentary" became notable in Japan, and the phrase "Crazy Live Commentary" ("Umehara ga kimeta") was also an internet meme outside the country.

== Background ==
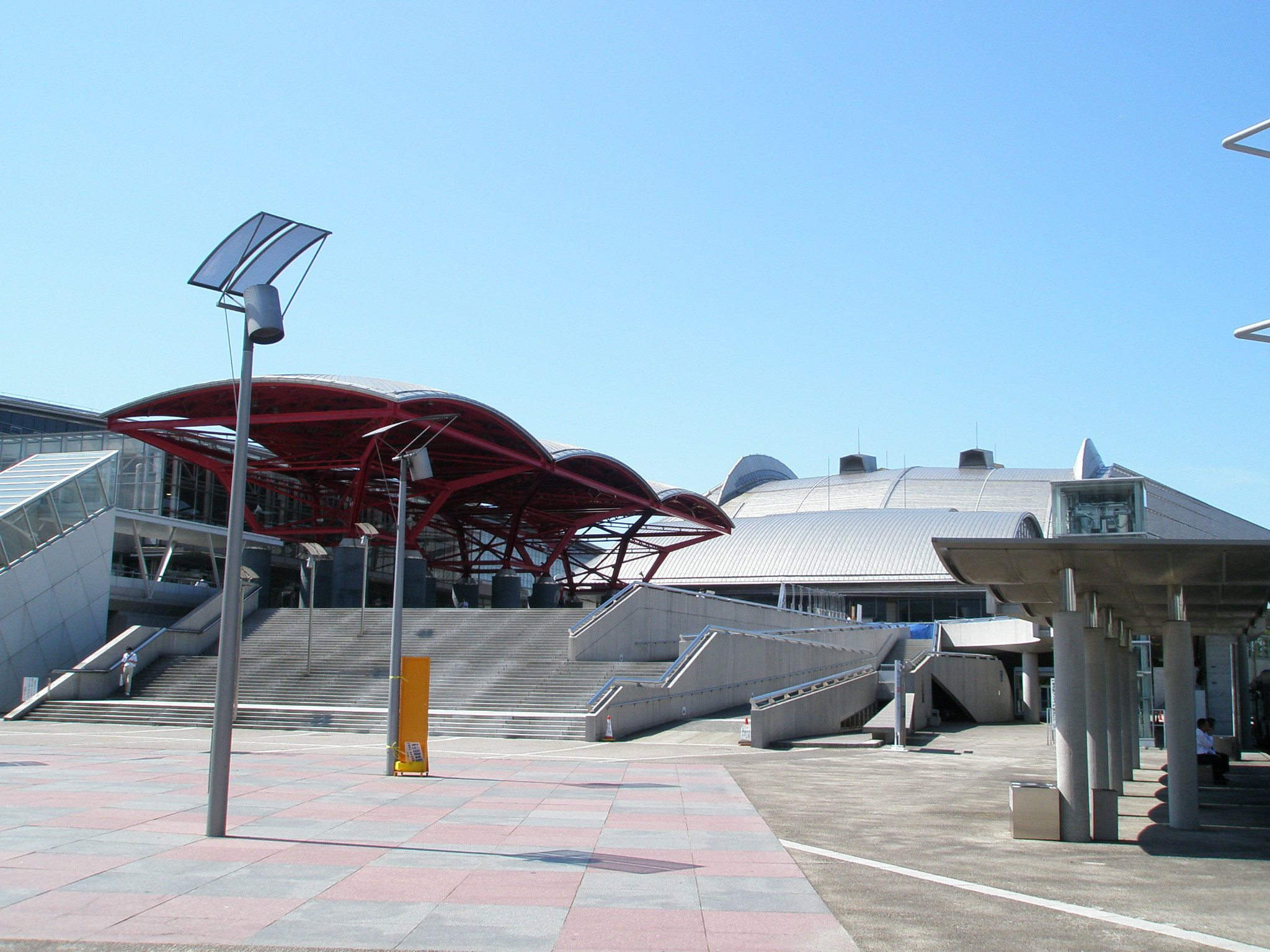
Makuhari Messe

"Crazy Live Commentary" was play-by-play commentary by "Gama no abura" on a match by Daigo Umehara, the top player of the fighting game Guilty Gear X2, at the 2003 Tougeki – Super Battle Opera (SBO) fighting-game tournament in Japan. The phrase "Umehara ga kimeta" is the commentary's most passionate exclamation.

=== Tournament ===
Crazy Live Commentary was made at the SBO fighting-game tournament. SBO, Japan's largest fighting-game tournament, was held from 2003 to 2012. It was organized by the arcade-game magazine Monthly Arcadia and Enterbrain, Arcadia's publisher. Unlike tournaments organized by game manufacturers to promote their games, SBO was not influenced by a particular game manufacturer. SBO, with participation from leading foreign professional gamers, was Japan's first internationally recognized e-sports tournament.

SBO included media development. Microphone performances were a highlight: saying something cocky before a match or stirring things up like a professional wrestling match. The 2003 SBO, on 22–23 March, was the first tournament at the Makuhari Messe event facility in Chiba City, Chiba Prefecture.

Seven titles were contested in SBO 03, which included Guilty Gear X2; the game had a large number of participants for all seven titles. From all over Japan, 1,941 teams entered the competition; the 32 teams surviving the preliminary rounds competed in the main competition at Makuhari Messe. The format of the Guilty Gear X2 matches was tournament-style, three-on-three, with teams of three players fighting one by one until one of them lost; the team with the remaining winner advanced to the next match.

=== Participants ===
==== Daigo Umehara ====
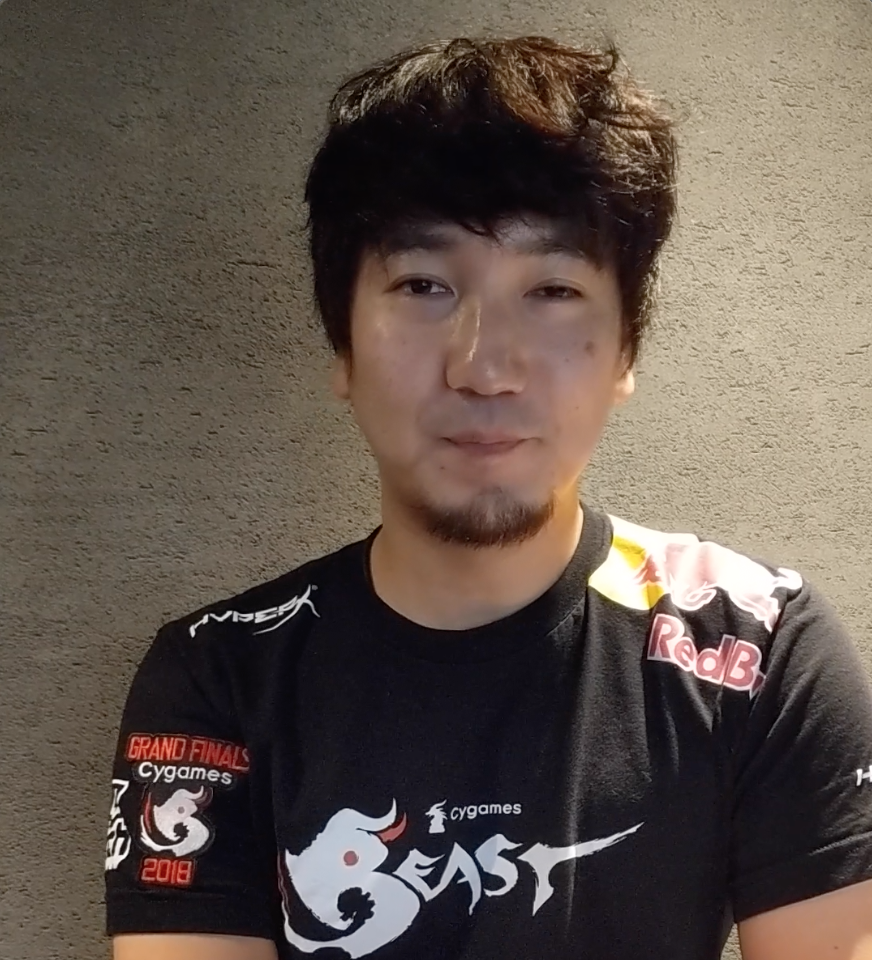
Umehara in 2018

Daigo Umehara, 22 years old, was a charismatic player in Japan's 2D fighting world. The team Umehara formed with two other players in the Guilty Gear X2 division took first place in the preliminary survey to predict the winning team, more than three times ahead of the second-place team. Umehara made it through to the main competition of all four of the seven titles he entered in SBO'03, finishing as the individual runner-up in Capcom vs. SNK 2 and the team champion in Super Street Fighter II Turbo.

==== Gama no abura ====
SBO's play-by-play was performed by 23-year-old "Gama no abura", who began working part-time at a video arcade before he was 20 years old because of his love of video games and desire to play in a tournament of his favorite title. He said that he began the tournament because he wanted to participate in it, but has become more interested in conveying the greatness of the players and making the event more interesting than in his success; he participates less as a player. The number of new arcade-game titles released was declining; Gama no abura was involved in the launch of the fighting-game tournament, believing that if the industry could be boosted by simultaneous national tournaments for multiple games, manufacturers would be more willing to create new titles to revitalize the industry.

=== The match ===
The "Crazy Live Commentary" was made in the second round of the main tournament. Umehara's team lost two of its players to the other team's spearheads, leaving Umehara alone. Umehara defeated two members of the opposing team and, in the final round of the generals' match, Umehara won decisively to advance to the third round. The commentary was:

Umehara ga! Tsukamaete! (Umehara grabs!)

Umehara ga! Gamenhaji! (Umehara pins him against the edge!)

Burst Yonde! Mada Hairu! (He predicts the burst! [The combo] still continues!)

Umehara ga! Tsu･･･Chikazuite! (Umehara gra—closes in! )

Umehara ga kimeta! (Umehara finishes it!)

— Gama no abura

Umehara's team was eliminated in the semifinals. Although there was no live streaming, the tournament was recorded and sold on the Enterbrain DVD Tougeki Super Battle DVD Trilogy-Disc3.

== Video distribution ==
On 6 March 2007, a 17-second video entitled 『電波実況 「ウメハラがぁっ！！！決めたぁぁーっ！！！(Crazy Live Commentary "Umehara ga kimeta!!!"』 was posted on the online video platform NicoNico. The video is one of NicoNico's oldest, which began as a video-sharing service that day. The enthusiastic commentary became popular and, by 2024, had over three million views.

=== Mashups ===
After Crazy Live Commentary videos were posted on NicoNico, a large number of mashup videos were created by splicing and editing images and audio from the commentary. According to the IT-news site Mynavi News, "ふぃぎゅ@ウメハラ," (a Crazy Live Commentary mashup for the theme song of the adult PC game ふぃぎゅ@Mate) began the Crazy Live Commentary mashup craze.

=== Participant reactions ===
On his streaming channel, Umehara was asked by a viewer how he felt about the Crazy Live Commentary upsurge on NicoNico: "I didn't feel bad about it, honestly, although I didn't get what was so funny about it". "Gama no abura" has a positive view of the commentary's fame, and approved its use as mashup material: "There were a lot of comments and stories about that play-by-play, but I heard that there were people who got to know Umehara because of that play-by-play, and that there were people who became interested in fighting games, so I think it was a success in a sense. At the time, I wanted people to understand how great he was, even if it meant making a laughingstock of myself".

== Reception ==
"Crazy Live Commentary" has been considered a masterpiece of live commentary, and was described by gaming media outlet Inside as "a great commentary that not only captures the momentum, but also accurately captures the development of the game". Online news outlet Netorabo introduced the commentary as "game-jargon-free, easy-to-understand, and emotionally-expressive shouting", and praised it for "making a significant contribution to the resurgence of fighting-game popularity". Esports website Gamer Gamer described "Crazy Live Commentary" as esports' best live commentary, a way to convey the competition's excitement comparable to announcer Fujio Kariya's commentary about the men's team gymnastics final at the 2004 Athens Olympics: "The parabolic line drawn by Moonsault is a bridge to glory!".

== Influence ==
=== In Japan ===
For the 2015 release of the Umehara-themed manga Umehara FIGHTING GAMERS! 2, a promotional video for the book was narrated in Crazy Live Commentary style by "Gama no abura".

During a 2022 Street Fighter V match in the long-running Topanga Championship, the MC saw Umehara's edge attack and exclaimed, "Umehara ga!" The commentator replied, "Gamenhaji!" and Crazy Live Commentary was replayed. It became popular on social media.

A 2024 song, "Rolling Sobat," was released by the rap group RainyBlueBell. The song's lyrics are interwoven with Crazy Live Commentary's signature phrase.

=== Abroad ===
When "Gama no abura" arrived in the United States to comment in Japanese at the 2011 Evolution Championship Series (the world's largest fighting-game tournament), he was interviewed by local media and replayed the Crazy Live Commentary.

In 2015, in the final match of the Ultra Street Fighter IV division of the fighting-game tournament Stunfest 2015 in France, Umehara made a one-sided attack. The commentator responded in Japanese, "Umehara ga ...", using the meme. The meme, released at Stunfest, was included in Umehara FIGHTING GAMERS! 2.

== Aftermath ==
In 2010, Umehara signed a sponsorship deal with an American video-game peripheral manufacturer and became a professional gamer. He is considered one of Japan's first professional gamers. In 2024, Umehara was still active in the top echelon of the fighting-game world and working to expand the player population. "Gama no abura" is a director of esports-related activities (which include founding an organization which organizes fighting-game events), and has fewer opportunities for play-by-play work.

== See also ==
- Evo Moment 37 - Umehara's upset in 2004, considered an iconic moment in esports history
