= Killer Instinct World Cup =

Fighting game tournament

- Current season, competition or edition: 2017
- Game: Fighting games Killer Instinct
- Founded: 2014
- Founder: UA|Brandon Alexander
- Country: United States
- Most recent champion: Darnell "Sleep" Waller (2017)
- Website: Killer Instinct World Cup

Killer Instinct World Cup is an annual fighting game tournament held in Texas, specifically focusing on the 2013 Killer Instinct reboot. The event's first incarnation was in January 2016 which featured Killer Instinct with a total of 32 qualifiers. The finals uses a double-elimination format and includes various tournaments as qualifiers such as EVO and Combo Breaker.

== History ==
=== 2016 season ===
The 2016 Killer Instinct World Cup Finals was announced by Ultra Arcade's Brandon Alexander in December 2014, which initially had a $10,000 prize pool with 16 qualifiers, but was eventually increased to a $30,000 prize pool with 32 qualifiers. Four last chance qualifying spots were held as well. The tournament was won by EVO 2015 Champion Jonathan "Rico Suave" Deleon, who primarily used Shadow Jago in the tournament, however used Omen against Matt Rebelo in Winner's Finals due to the lack of TJ Combo matchup experience and Glacius in Grand Finals as a hard counter to Lenin "MyGod" Castillo's Sabrewulf. The EVO 2014 Champion, Emmanuel "CD Jr." Brito has notably tied for last, despite being seeded 3rd in the bracket. The #1 player in points rankings Kenneth "Bass" Armas was notably upset in the first round of the tournament to one of the Last Chance qualifiers Joshua "Waterhorses" Vargas, while managing to blast through Loser's Bracket, while bowing out to FlipSid3 Tactics' Darnell "Sleep" Waller. However, one of the most unexpected placings was Canadian player Rebelo ending in 3rd place while being sent to Loser's by Rico Suave in Winner's Finals, followed by being eliminated by MyGod in a Loser's Finals runback from an early Winner's Bracket upset.

Killer Instinct World Cup took place at the Fountain Bleu in San Antonio, Texas on January 30–31, 2016.

Killer Instinct
Place	Player	Alias	Character(s)
1st	(United States) Jonathan Deleon	Rico Suave	Shadow Jago, Omen, Glacius
2nd	(United States) Lenin Castillo	UA|MyGod	Sabrewulf
3rd	(Canada) Matt Rebelo	UL|Rebelo	TJ Combo, Shadow Jago
4th	(United States) Darnell Waller	F3|Sleep	Kan-Ra, ARIA, Glacius
5th	(United States) Kenneth Armas	UA|Bass	Spinal, Cinder
5th	(United States) Josue Herrera	BH|Grief	Sadira, Orchid
7th	(United States) Keyshawn Johnson	cR|Cupcake	Sabrewulf, Maya
7th	(United States) Joshua Vargas	Waterhorses	Glacius
9th	(United States) Blake Whitworth	YOMI|JagoBlake	Jago
9th	(United States) Nicky Iovene	NS|Nicky Vengenz	Fulgore
9th	(United States) Christina Freeland	PAG|PinkDiamond	Maya
9th	(United States) Paulo Duarte	AKG|ShinPaulo	Thunder
13th	(United States) Larry Dent III	LCD	Orchid, Maya
13th	(United States) Paul Ramos	Paul B	Sabrewulf, Hisako, Riptor
13th	(United States) Deion Thompson	Thompxson	Jago
13th	(United States) Chase Graves	UL|ZergKiller	Aganos, Spinal

=== 2017 season ===
The 2017 Killer Instinct World Cup was announced on April 5, 2016. The season would include more offline qualifiers than the previous season, as well as once again being a 32-man finals. In 2017, the KI World Cup issued a ban towards taunting and teabagging, following its frequent practice by NuckleDu in Street Fighter V. This would spark controversy from the fighting game community with members such as Echo Fox pro SonicFox and Iron Galaxy Studios dev Adam "Keits" Heart speaking about their disdain regarding the ban. Lab monster Javits used Daigo Umehara's playstyle from EVO Moment #37 as a reference to mention that enforcing such rule would be impossible. The teabagging ban would later be revoked following the controversy surrounding the rule, while there is still zero tolerance policies for threats and sexual harassment.

The event took place from March 10 to 12 of 2017. The Kilgore DLC raised more than $50,000 towards the 2018 season's prize pool.

The 2017 edition is the most recent completed Killer Instinct World Cup on record.

Killer Instinct
Place	Player	Alias	Character(s)
1st	(United States) Darnell Waller	F3|Sleep	ARIA, Kilgore
2nd	(United States) Calvin Phelps	Storm179	Hisako
3rd	(United States) Deion Thompson	BH|Thompxson	Jago
4th	(United States) Nicholas Iovene	Circa|Nicky	Fulgore, Mira
5th	(United States) Joshua Vargas	BH|Waterhorses	Glacius
5th	(United States) Dayton Jones	UA|Wheels	Sabrewulf, Tusk, Orchid, Gargos
7th	(United States) Jonathan Deleon	Rico Suave	Gargos
7th	(United States) Demandre Pressley	MT|LetalisVenator	Aganos, General RAAM, Omen
9th	(United States) Kenneth Armas	UA|Bass	Spinal, Mira, Cinder
9th	(United Kingdom) Rob Doherty	HW|Valoraxe	Cinder
9th	(United States) Samuel Mora	TBS|Sickle	Glacius
9th	(United States) Larry Dent III	LCD	Maya, Orchid, Gargos
13th	(United States) Latrell Thomas	BH|Amenty	Mira, Maya, Gargos
13th	(United States) Damien Walton	Selfless|Fiyah Liger	Riptor
13th	(United States) Damian Gonzalez	Raven is Raw	Spinal
13th	(Canada) Matt Rebelo	STDx|Rebelo	TJ Combo
