= Tougeki – Super Battle Opera =

E-sport competition in Japan

- 2012 event logo
- Sport: Fighting games
- Founded: 2003
- Folded: 2012
- Country: Japan
- Last champion: Fuudo (SF4)

Tougeki 2009 Final at JCB Hall in Tokyo

Tougeki - Super Battle Opera (闘劇, Tōgeki; lit. fighting drama) (SBO), also known as the Arcadia Cup Tournament, was an annual Japanese fighting video game tournament hosted by the magazine Arcadia. Several games are represented at a single year's tournament, with the lineup changing every year. Which games are to be represented are decided by the organizers of the event. It was considered one of the two most prestigious fighting game tournaments, along with the Evolution Championship Series. It was suspended indefinitely in 2012.

Tougeki generally begins in April with the qualifications rounds, which were spread over all of Japan and were distributed over a number of months. The finals were then held over two to three days, usually in August. "Tougeki" typically referred only to the finals.

For 2012, Tougeki was held as part of the larger outdoor gaming event GAME SUMMER FESTIVAL 2012, which also included Ongeki ~Game Sound Impact 2012~, for music games, and Wasshoi 2012 Summer!, for shoot 'em up games, and was held in Narita, Chiba. The event was streamed on niconico for 1500 niconico points (1500 JPY) for one day, and 2500 niconico points (2500 JPY) for two days. As the first tournament held outdoors, there were many reported problems with the event, including low attendance, very high temperatures, glare on the screens, and network problems that required tournament matches to be restarted. Extended tournament run time caused many entrants to miss the final train of the day, many of whom resorted to sleeping on the streets of Chiba.

== History ==
The 12th Super Battle Opera took place in 2012 on August 4 and 5, and featured the following games:

=== Singles 1 vs. 1 ===
- Soulcalibur V
- Ultimate Marvel vs. Capcom 3
- Persona 4 Arena

=== Teams 2 vs 2 ===
- Tekken Tag Tournament 2 Unlimited
- Aquapazza Version 2.0

=== Teams 3 vs 3 ===
- Virtua Fighter 5 Final Showdown
- Super Street Fighter IV: Arcade Edition
- Street Fighter III: 3rd Strike

== Format ==
Each tournament is played either individually or in teams of up to three players and uses a single-elimination system to determine a winner. The qualifications are done on a regional level using a two-tier system: Players form their teams and compete at local arcade halls in a single elimination tournament. The winners then go on to a regional playoff, and the winners of this playoff are granted a spot in the finals in Tokyo.

American and European players have been granted special spots at the Tougeki finals. In Europe, the representatives are decided by the Tougeki France organization.

Though a few arcade machines are set up for casual play at the finals, the main focus is on the tournaments.

== DVD releases ==
A few months after the finals in Tokyo, DVD movies containing all matches in the playoffs were released by Enterbrain, the owner of Arcadia. The movies were released in a number of volumes, containing a number of discs. Each disc containing one entire tournament.

== Related articles ==
- Umehara ga kimeta - One of the most famous moments in SBO'03
