= Xfire =

Instant messaging service and game server browser

xfire

- Screenshot of Xfire Client version 1.143, showing a list of buddies with the Phoenix skin
- Original authors: Garrett Blythe, Chris Kirmse and Mike Judge
- Developers: Xfire, Inc.
- Release: 2003; 23 years ago
- Operating system: Microsoft Windows
- Type: Instant messaging, file sharing; screenshooting, screencasting
- License: Freeware
- Website: www.xfire.com

Xfire was a proprietary freeware instant messaging service for gamers that also served as a game server browser with various other features. It was available for Microsoft Windows. Xfire was originally developed by Ultimate Arena based in Menlo Park, California.

Xfire's partnership with Livestream allowed users to broadcast live video streams of their current game to an audience. The Xfire website also maintained a "Top Ten" games list, ranking games by the number of hours Xfire users spend playing each game every day. World of Warcraft had been the most played game for many years, but was surpassed by League of Legends on June 20, 2011.

Social.xfire.com was a community site for Xfire users, allowing them to upload screenshots, photos and videos and to make contacts. Xfire hosted events every month, which included debates, game tournaments, machinima contests, and chat sessions with Xfire or game developers.

As of January 3, 2014, it had over 24 million registered users. Xfire's web based social media was discontinued on June 12, 2015, and the messaging function was shut down on June 27, 2015. The last of Xfire's services were shut down on April 30, 2016.

== History ==
Xfire, Inc. was founded in 2002 by Dennis "Thresh" Fong, Mike Cassidy, Max Woon, and David Lawee. The company was formerly known as Ultimate Arena, but changed its name to Xfire when its desktop client Xfire became more popular and successful than its gaming website. The first version of the Xfire desktop client was code-named Scoville, which was first developed in 2003 by Garrett Blythe, Chris Kirmse, Mike Judge, and others. The services ability to track game play hours and quickly launch web games, compared to other services at the time quickly gained it popularity.

On April 25, 2006, Xfire was acquired by Viacom in a US$102 million deal.

In September 2006, Sony was misinterpreted to have announced that Xfire would be used for the PlayStation 3. The confusion came when one PlayStation 3 game, Untold Legends: Dark Kingdom, was to use some of Xfire's features with more game support planned for the future.

On May 7, 2007, Xfire announced that they had reached 7 million registered users. Shortly after, on June 13, 2007, co-founder and former CEO Mike Cassidy departed the company to work for venture capital firm Benchmark Capital. Adam Boyden, Vice President of Business Development & Marketing, was assigned to take his place and manage the company for a temporary period.

On August 2, 2010, Xfire was acquired by Titan Gaming, a skill-based matchmaking service for game developers. Titan Gaming had raised only US$1 million prior to the acquisition, so Viacom likely sold Xfire for significantly less than they bought it. On the day of the acquisition, the Xfire team broadcast a message to all users stating that most of the original employees would be leaving. The message was later put on Xfire's website. In October 2011, little over a year after it was acquired, Xfire was spun off from Titan Gaming and raised US$4 million in funding. Xfire's president estimated that US$44 million had been invested into the company up to that point.

After regaining independence, Xfire pivoted to focus on the Asian market. On April 10, 2012, it hired Malcom CasSelle, a former Tencent executive, as CEO. On the same day, it announced a joint venture with a Chinese Communist Youth League-affiliated company to localize and distribute its service in mainland China. A month later, it raised US$3 million in a funding round led by IDM Venture Capital, a Singapore-based firm. The financing was aimed at expanding Xfire's market share in Asia, and the company said it would likely be part of a larger round of funding. However, this was the last round of funding the company received before its demise.

On June 10, 2015, Xfire announced that its social services would be shut down on Friday, June 12 with only 2 days' notice. The home page for the social part of Xfire at that time linked to an export page where users could download all their previously uploaded screenshots and videos.

The export function ceased to be available on or around June 27, 2015. On July 6, 2015, the site was shut down and the contents of the service were deleted.

=== Lawsuits ===
Yahoo! filed a lawsuit against Xfire, Inc. on January 28, 2005, claiming that Xfire has infringed Yahoo!'s U.S. patent No. 6,699,125 for a "Game server for use in connection with a messenger server". Xfire, Inc. filed a countersuit against Yahoo! on March 10, 2005, which was eventually disqualified by the judge. There has been a settlement between the companies as of January 31, 2006. More details were posted to Xfire's forums.

== Features ==
Xfire had many features, the majority of which could only be used while in-game.

Xfire featured the ability to detect the video game a particular user was running. By analyzing running processes, Xfire could detect active games and then send that information to the Xfire servers. Other user's clients would then be updated with this information. For many games, it could also detect which server users were playing on, the level which was running, and ping times. Using these features, users were also able to see what games their friends were playing, and to join any friends who were currently in-game by having Xfire launch the game and join the friend's server automatically. Xfire logged what games users were playing, how many hours they had played them, and saved other information (such as scores) from game servers. This information could be converted into a PNG image by the server via PHP for every user to use as a signature.

Xfire allowed players to take screenshots in-game and save them to a specified folder, though this only worked with games that had Xfire in-game support. Users could select and caption any screenshots they wished to upload and share on their Xfire profile page. Xfire also had the ability to record video in-game, though this often had a significant impact on game performance and recording quality if one had a low-performance system, causing the frame rate to drop dramatically. However, this is typically true of all video recording during gaming, and was not unique to Xfire.

The clients main function was as an instant messenger. Similar to other such online services, any user who had been added as a 'friend' could be immediately contacted through text chat. To communicate with other users in-game, Xfire users could send and receive instant messages from inside any game that was running in full screen mode, regardless of the games the sender or recipient were in. This eliminated the need to minimize the game window. Users were also able to directly send files to one another via the chat window. In August 2005, Xfire updated to version 1.43, which added a beta voice chat feature using Voice over Internet Protocol (VoIP) technology to the application called "Xfire Pro-Voice". Until early 2009, if voice chat was being used in a chat room, users had to host the voice chat, causing quality problems and lag due to some users having better system capabilities than others. Xfire hosted the voice chat sessions to resolve quality problems. On May 4, 2009, a built-in alpha AOL Instant Messenger and Windows Live Messenger plugin was released in 1.108. As of May 4, 2009, it only supported chatting, and none of AIM's other features. From December 1, 2009, users could access their Twitter accounts through Xfire, allowing players to view updates posted by other users, as well as post their own. Google Talk was also subsequently added. In December 2011, Xfire added support for Facebook chatting, enabling users to chat with their Facebook friends from within the game.

Xfire installed itself as the system-wide handler for the xfire: URI scheme, which enabled users to add friends, join game servers and perform other functions in the client by clicking links on websites. The scheme was provisionally registered with IANA in 2012.

On December 16, 2011, Xfire added a feature to allow its users to capture in-game video and upload it to YouTube. This feature was similar to other popular in-game video recording software products, but allowed users to record videos up to 10 minutes in length for free.

Xfire added a video streaming feature in version 1.97. To view a broadcast, a web browser plugin was required, supporting only Internet Explorer and Mozilla Firefox. In version 1.113, released on August 17, 2009, the broadcast system was changed to allow a plugin-less, Flash-based view compatible with any Flash-enabled browser. This feature let anyone watch a live feed of a user's screen while they were playing a game. Live streams had accompanying chat rooms that let anyone who was watching a live feed communicate.

In-game internet browsing capabilities were added to Xfire in version 1.103. Its homepage was set as a statistics page of the game currently being played by the user, including listing other players and any clans and guilds based around the game being played.

== Support ==
As of December 1, 2012, Xfire provided support for more than 3,000 games, of many different genres.

Support for Windows 98 and Windows Me was discontinued as of January 2007.

=== Third-party modifications and software forking ===
There were many third party modifications for Xfire's client and services, including skins, infoview templates, plugins, and protocol implementations. Some of these may or may not violate Xfire's terms of service.

Skins could be used to provide a new look to the Xfire client and chat windows, while Infoview skins could be used to provide extra functionality in the Xfire Infoview pane. Skins were made using XML and image files, while Infoviews were made using HTML, JavaScript, and images.

==== Plugins ====
There were a variety of third-party plugins developed for use with Xfire.

- OpenFire: An open-source (LGPL licensed) Java API and suite of tools to access the Xfire instant messaging network.
- Xfirelib: An open-source library written in C++ which implements the Xfire protocol. Based on it is an Extensible Messaging and Presence Protocol (XMPP) gateway to Xfire which also implements Gamers Own Instant Messenger (GOIM) extensions to the XMPP protocol.

The following plugins let users chat on Xfire with other instant messaging clients:

- Gfire: A Pidgin plugin for Linux and Windows that lets users chat and see what games friends are playing. It has most of the major Xfire features: group chat, clan chat, file transfer, avatars, server, and game detection.
- Kopete plugin: A plugin that lets users chat and see the status of friends.
- Miranda NG plugin: A plugin that allows users to chat with others on Xfire, detect games, and more.
- Xblaze: An open-source plugin for Adium that allows communication over the Xfire protocol, using the MacFire implementation. It is the first Xfire client for Mac OS X.

=== Clients ===
Several Xfire clients were available for different platforms:

- MacFire: An open-source implementation for of the Xfire network protocol for Mac OS X. It was made possible, in part, by prior work done for Xblaze, XfireLib, and OpenFire.
- BlackFire: A client for Mac OS X Snow Leopard.

== Reception ==
The editors of Computer Games Magazine presented Xfire with their 2006 "Best Utility" award.

== See also ==
- Comparison of screencasting software
