= Red Annihilation =

1997 Quake eSport tournament

Quake at the Red Annihilation
- Venues: World Congress Center, E3 1997
- Location: Atlanta, Georgia, United States
- Dates: May 1997
- Competitors: ~1,900 online contestants 16 offline finalists

Medalists
gold medal	Dennis "Thresh" Fong
silver medal	Tom "Entropy" Kimzey
bronze medal	Patrick "B2" Li

Red Annihilation was a Quake competitive eSport event held in May 1997 that was one of the first nationwide video game competitions held in the United States. In the final match of the tournament, Dennis "Thresh" Fong defeated Tom "Entropy" Kimzey of Impulse 9 on the map Castle of the Damned.

The tournament was created first as Kings of Capture Quake Tournament started by Michael "Hawthorne" Shearon, after contacting Intergraph for possible sponsorship the tournament was folded into what became Red Annihilation.

The tournament was then developed and organized by Rob Esterling, executive director overseeing Intergraph Computer Systems's commercial and consumer graphics group, and his Intergraph team including Jim Terzian, the tournament's director and Victor Johnson, the team's Art Director.

In 1996, Microsoft's DirectX group hosted game competitions, first at the Computer Game Developers Conference, then as a separate event, selecting the players and flying them in to compete.

When a further Microsoft DirectX-organized event, intended to be held at Naval Air Station Alameda, was cancelled, Intergraph announced it would host a tournament that would be an open, national computer game competition and chose Quake as the game to be played.

Intergraph brought in Quake developer id Software, 3D computer graphics chipset maker Rendition, and online gaming company Mpath Interactive as partners in Red Annihilation. Will Bryant and Frank Cabanski of the Quake ClanRing were selected to operate the game competition because of their prior pioneering experience running large scale gaming tournaments.

The initial phase of the tournament was held on Mpath's MPlayer network with over 2000 participants from across the United States competing online in one-on-one matches.

The top 16 players were flown to Atlanta, Georgia for the concluding phase of the tournament, where they competed inside the World Congress Center in a gaming arena Intergraph built on the floor of the Electronic Entertainment Expo (E3). This phase of the competition used vQuake, the hardware accelerated version of the game, played on Intergraph PC computers equipped with Rendition V1000-based Intense3D graphics accelerators. Players were able to use their own keyboards, mice and other pointing devices if they wished.

As E3 was at the time an industry exhibition open to the trade only, most spectators watched the final competitions online via in-game cameras orchestrated by Bryant and Cabanski. The final morning of the tournament was also covered from the show floor by NBC's Today and The Wall Street Journal.

It was discovered during the award ceremony that tournament winner Fong, a student at De Anza College, would not be able to drive his prize as he was not insured for such a vehicle. John Carmack agreed to underwrite Fong's insurance for a year so the latter could enjoy his new car.
