= Quake (video game) =

1996 video game

- Developer: id Software (Note: The enhanced version of the game was developed by Nightdive Studios.)
- Publisher: GT Interactive (Note: ClickBOOM published the game on the AmigaOS.; MacSoft published the game for the Mac OS.; Sega published the game for the Saturn.; Midway Games published the game for the Nintendo 64.; Macmillan Digital Publishing USA published the game for Linux.; R-Comp Interactive published the game for RISC OS in 1999.; In 2021, Bethesda Softworks published the enhanced version of the game.)
- Designers: John Romero; Sandy Petersen; American McGee; Tim Willits
- Programmers: John Carmack; Michael Abrash; John Cash
- Artists: Adrian Carmack; Kevin Cloud; Paul Steed
- Composers: Nine Inch Nails: Nintendo 64: Aubrey Hodges; Scourge of Armagon, Dissolution of Eternity: Jeehun Hwang; Dawn of the Machine: Christian Plogfors
- Series: Quake
- Engine: Quake engine (Note: The Saturn version of the game, developed by Lobotomy Software, uses the Slavedriver engine. The enhanced version uses the KEX Engine.)
- Platforms: MS-DOS: Windows; Linux; Classic Mac OS; Saturn; Nintendo 64; Arcade systems; AmigaOS; RISC OS; PlayStation 4; Xbox One; Nintendo Switch; PlayStation 5; Xbox Series X/S
- Release: July 22, 1996: MS-DOS; NA: June 22, 1996 (shareware); NA: July 22, 1996 (retail); EU: August 25, 1996; Windows; NA: March 11, 1997 (WinQuake); WW: August 3, 2007 (Steam); Linux; WW: July 5, 1996; Mac OS; NA: August 28, 1997; Saturn; EU: November 27, 1997; NA: December 2, 1997; Nintendo 64; NA: March 24, 1998; EU: May 24, 1998; Switch, PlayStation 4, Xbox One; WW: August 19, 2021; PlayStation 5, Xbox Series X/S; WW: October 12, 2021
- Genre: First-person shooter
- Modes: Single-player, multiplayer

Quake is a 1996 first-person shooter video game developed by id Software and published by GT Interactive for MS-DOS. It is the first game in the Quake series. The plot centers on teleportation experiments, dubbed Slipgates, that have resulted in an unforeseen invasion of Earth by a hostile force code-named Quake, which commands a vast army of monsters. The player, a soldier, travels through the Slipgates to find and destroy the source of the invasion. The game alternates between futuristic military bases and medieval, gothic environments, with both science fiction and fantasy weaponry and enemies, such as possessed soldiers, ogres, and armor-clad knights. It draws heavily on gothic fiction and the works of H. P. Lovecraft, and was originally inspired by a Dungeons & Dragons campaign among id Software staff.

The successor to id's Doom series, Quake built upon the technology and gameplay of its predecessor. Upgrading the 2.5D-based Doom engine before it, the Quake engine offered fully 3D rendering and fostered early support for hardware acceleration through OpenGL. After Doom helped establish deathmatches, Quake added various multiplayer options, and online multiplayer became increasingly common with the QuakeWorld update and services such as QuakeSpy. The music was composed by Nine Inch Nails, whose frontman Trent Reznor also voices the player character.

Quake was initially released as shareware: a limited demo was distributed for free and the full game could be purchased over the phone, followed by retail distribution through GT Interactive. Although first sales were hampered by hacked shareware versions, retail sales were substantial, with 373,000 copies sold and $18 million earned in the United States in its first year. It was ported to Linux, Windows, Mac OS, and the Sega Saturn in 1996‍–‍1997 and to the Nintendo 64 in 1998. It received near-universal acclaim, though its ports were received less favorably. Two expansions, the mission packs Scourge of Armagon and Dissolution of Eternity, followed soon after to positive reviews. In 2007, Quake was made available on Steam among other id games. In August 2021, an "enhanced" remaster developed by Nightdive Studios and published by Bethesda Softworks was released for Windows, the Nintendo Switch, PlayStation 4, and Xbox One, and later the PlayStation 5 and Xbox Series X/S. It included the original expansions plus two newer episodes developed by MachineGames, Dimension of the Past and Dimension of the Machine. In 2026, during Quake's 30th anniversary, MachineGames and id released a fifth expansion, Dawn of the Machine.

Quake is often cited as one of the best video games ever made. (Note: Attributed to multiple sources:) Retrospective analyses credit the game with revolutionizing multiplayer and establishing principles such as rocket jumping, as well as popularizing modding, speedrunning, and esports and pioneering machinima. (Note: Attributed to multiple sources:) It was inducted into the World Video Game Hall of Fame in 2025. Despite its acclaim and influence, its development was troubled – the team spent much of it under crunch, and after release, many id Software staff left the company; most employees, including co-founder John Romero, exited due to creative differences, burnout, and disagreements over leadership.

== Gameplay ==
The double-barreled shotgun firing upon an Enforcer enemy on the first map of the third episode

In Quake's single-player mode, players explore levels, fight monsters, and find secret areas before reaching an exit. Switches or keys open doors, and the game has no dedicated "use" key; players instead push against objects to activate them. Before entering an episode, the player chooses one of three pathways to select a difficulty of easy, medium, or hard. A fourth skill level, "Nightmare", was described by the manual as "so bad that the entry is hidden, so people won't wander in by accident".

The player can carry up to eight weapons, always including at least an axe and a shotgun, and draws on four ammunition pools: shells, nails, rockets, and cells. As in Doom, power-ups last a short time: the Ring of Shadows grants invisibility, the Pentagram of Protection invulnerability, the Biosuit nullifies environmental hazards, and the Quad Damage quadruples weapon damage. Armor comes in three tiers that differ in effectiveness and durability. Enemies and players that suffer extraordinary fatal damage are blown apart – this is termed gibbing; the Zombie enemy uses this mechanic and cannot be killed unless through gibbing.

The single-player campaign is organized into four episodes of seven to eight levels each, including one secret level per episode (the first episode's has very low gravity). Dying restarts the level; the PC versions allow quicksaving at any time and the console versions allow it between levels. After finishing an episode, the player returns to the hub level, where another can be chosen; the manual recommends playing them in order, but any sequence works, and each episode starts the player from scratch. Only episode one, which formed the shareware version, has a traditional boss. The objective at the end of each episode is to recover a magic rune; once all four are collected, the hub's floor opens to reveal the end level and the final boss.

In multiplayer mode, players on several computers connect to a server, where they can play the campaign together in co-op mode or compete in deathmatch, the most popular mode and a staple of LAN parties. Dying players immediately respawn but lose collected items, and items respawn after some time. Deathmatch is played free-for-all, in one-on-one duels, or in teams (also called clans). The built-in demo system logs a player's inputs so a run can be replayed in-game without encoding video; demo files were shared online to verify speedruns and show off tricks.

The gameplay was considered contemporarily unique because of the different ways the player can maneuver: starting and stopping suddenly, jumping unnaturally high, and changing direction mid-air. A mistake in the movement code made it possible to exceed the maximum running speed by jumping at precise moments while strafing, techniques known as bunnyhopping and strafe-jumping. Rocket jumping lets players reach otherwise inaccessible areas at the cost of a rocket and risk of losing health or even dying. Multiplayer Quake was one of the first games identified as a form of electronic sport; a notable participant, Dennis Fong, won John Carmack's Ferrari 328 at the Red Annihilation tournament in 1997.

== Plot ==
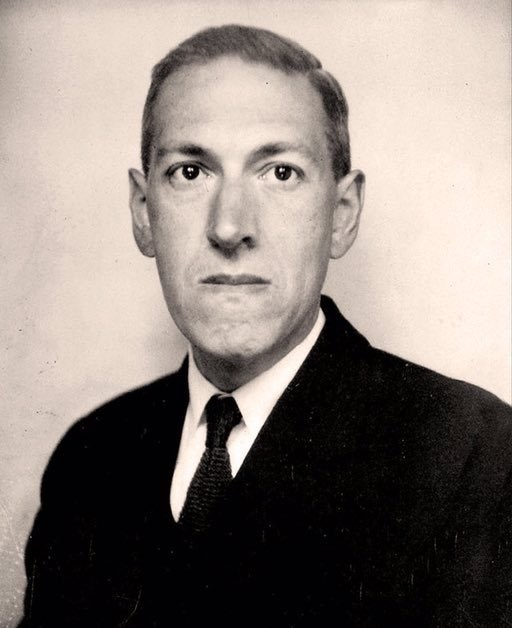
Many of the enemies of Quake were inspired by the characters of American writer H. P. Lovecraft (pictured in 1934).

The game's setting is heavily influenced by dark fantasy, including H. P. Lovecraft's Cthulhu Mythos. Dimensional Shamblers appear as enemies, the manual calls the "Spawn" enemies "Formless Spawn of Tsathoggua", the boss of the first episode is named Chthon, the main villain is Shub-Niggurath, explicitly an Old One, and the four episodes' titles reference Lovecraftian names.

The player takes the role of the protagonist (voiced by Trent Reznor), unnamed but referred to as Ranger in later games, who is sent into a portal to stop an enemy code-named "Quake". The government had developed a working teleportation prototype called a "Slipgate"; Quake compromised it by connecting it to its own teleportation system and used it to send death squads to test humanity's martial capabilities. The sole survivor of "Operation Counterstrike" is Ranger, who must fight his way through the episodic dimensions, starting each episode from an overrun human military base and using a Slipgate or an other-worldly equivalent. The realms consist of gothic, medieval, and lava-filled caves and dungeons with recurring hellish imagery such as pentagrams, demons, and depictions of torture. Ranger's main objective is to collect four magic runes, the key to ending the invasion. After obtaining all four, he enters Shub-Niggurath's pit and battles a series of enemies before teleporting inside her, a mechanic known as telefragging, causing her to explode and die.

== Development ==
=== Concept ===
In the early 1990s, the staff at id Software played a private Dungeons & Dragons campaign with John Carmack as DM. It featured the Silver Shadow Band, adventurers who rode a silver dragon, and a powerful character named Quake, who wielded a magic hammer and was accompanied by a floating artifact, the Hellgate Cube. id's first release, Commander Keen, teased a follow-up called The Fight for Justice, a top-down role-playing game starring Quake; the team began it in January 1991 but shelved it because the technology of the era could not realize their vision.

After Doom II, id returned to the Quake concept and entered an R&D phase while Carmack worked on the engine. In a December 1994 online post, John Romero rejected speculation that Quake would be a slow, RPG-style game and promised "constant, hectic action throughout". Romero's plans were nonetheless heavily influenced by role-playing games: the player, as Quake, would wield a hammer and be aided by the Hellgate Cube, which would help drain the souls of enemies, and the view would shift to a side-on perspective during combat in the manner of fighting games. Early information released publicly focused on a Thor-like character with a giant hammer, and the October 1995 cover of PC Gamer showed Quake with his hammer, alongside screenshots of medieval environments and a dragon. The dragon was never actually implemented; Romero had merely placed it in the sky for a promotional screenshot. An Aztec-style texture set was developed but dropped after designers such as American McGee, who preferred a heavy-metal look, were not inspired by it.

=== Engine ===
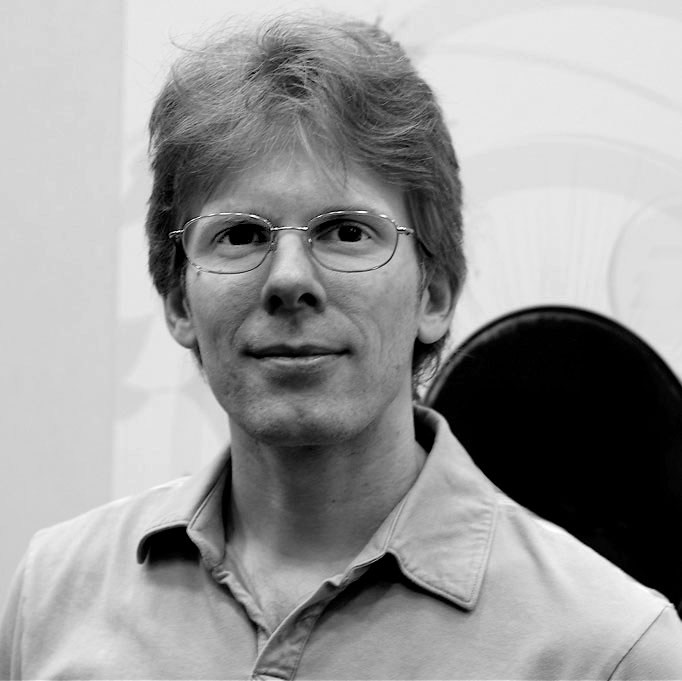
John Carmack (pictured in 2006) programmed Quake.

Before gameplay could be worked on in earnest, Carmack had to build the game engine, which took much longer than anticipated. He was developing not only a fully 3D engine but also a TCP/IP networking model; Romero later reflected that id might have used separate engine and game teams. The Quake engine popularized several major advances in the genre: polygonal models instead of prerendered sprites, true 3D level design instead of a 2.5D map, precalculated lightmaps, and allowing end users to partially program the game via QuakeC, which facilitated and legitimized fan-created modifications. Both the Doom engine and the Quake engine used binary space partitioning to process level data, but the latter used a version generalized to three dimensions. Michael Abrash, whom Carmack hired in 1995, helped him create the engine.

Working with an engine still in development was difficult for the designers. Around fifty levels were developed during R&D, but engine changes meant the team frequently had to redo work, and much was scrapped by the time the engine was completed in late 1995. With the team burned out, Carmack proposed building the game around the existing levels as a more conventional first-person shooter, which would be faster and less risky. Romero, who had wanted a more design-driven game, opposed the change but relented; the creative differences contributed to his departure after the game's completion.

=== Team and production ===
Quake was programmed by John Carmack, Michael Abrash, and John Cash. The levels and scenarios were designed by American McGee, Sandy Petersen, John Romero, and Tim Willits, and the graphics were designed by Adrian Carmack, Kevin Cloud, and Paul Steed. Cloud created the monster and player graphics using Alias. Initially, the player character would hit enemies with the butt of a gun when out of ammunition; shortly before release this was replaced with an axe. id released QTest on February 24, 1996, a technology demo limited to three multiplayer maps with no single-player support. It gave players their first look at the filesystem and modifiability of the engine, and entity mods and custom skins began appearing online before the full game was released. Morale was low, and developers were in crunch from November 1995 until the June 1996 release, working seven days a week; Romero called it the worst time in the company's history. He was the only team member in the office on launch day to upload the files.

=== Level design ===
If you saw the original names of levels, you'd see we weren't naming them E1M1 [Episode 1, Map 1] or anything like that. It was just JRwhiz3, or DMbase3, or Sandycity1. Stuff like that. We just said, 'Let's create a bunch of cool stuff and we'll figure out how to fit it together.'

— John Romero, Rocket Jump: Quake and the Golden Age of First-Person Shooters

Initially, maps were created haphazardly without a specific organization or order. As development progressed, the staff could not agree on a unifying theme, so each designer specialized in their own concept, designing episodes isolated from each other. Romero still wanted to link the episodes, so he began each with a military base from which the player teleports to the respective dimension.

Each of the four episodes exhibits its designer's vision in its textures, architecture, layout, and enemies. Episode one, the Dimension of the Doomed, features level themes from multiple designers; as the only free episode, it was meant to give potential buyers a wide sample of what the paid episodes offered. Episode two, the Realm of Black Magic, has a medieval theme with knights, castles, and stained glass windows. Episode three, the Netherworld, has a more "runic" theme, with metallic construction and lava instead of water or slime. The last episode, the Elder World, was made the most difficult: a hostile world of abstract, foreign geometry rather than identifiable structures.

=== Audio ===
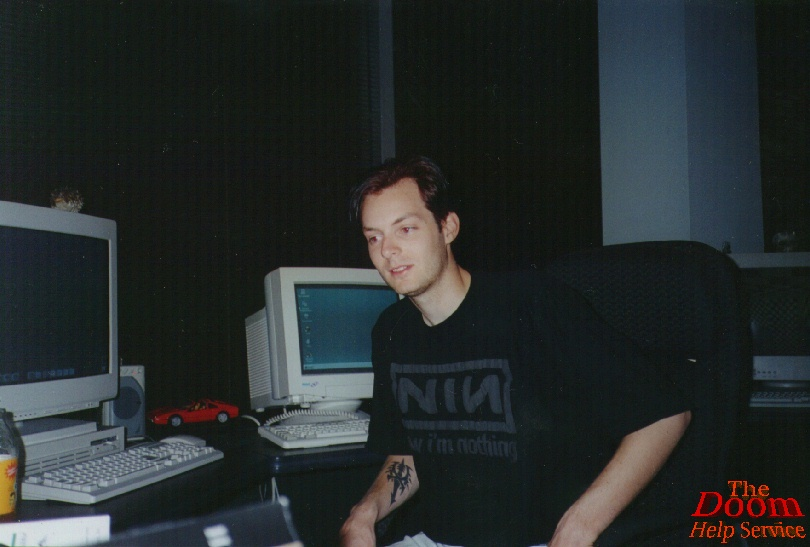
American McGee in October 1995 with a Nine Inch Nails shirt. The band provided music for Quake and its logo appears in-game.

Quake's music and sound design were created by Nine Inch Nails (NIN) and frontman Trent Reznor, using ambient soundscapes and synthesized drones to create atmospheric tracks. Reznor also voiced the player character's grunts and groans. The soundtrack contains 10 tracks. The collaboration grew from mutual fandom: NIN were avid Doom players, and after a 1995 concert, American McGee and John Carmack befriended its members, and McGee suggested collaborating on Quake. McGee then served as id's liaison with the band's New Orleans studio. id wanted ambient noises rather than the melodic level themes of earlier games, and the band devoted most of 1995 and early 1996 to the project. As a homage, the ammo boxes for the Nailgun and Super Nailgun display the band's logo.

The official soundtrack received favorable reviews, with many critics saying the music effectively enhanced the game's immersive mood. In his 1996 review for GameSpot, Trent Ward wrote, "Simply put, this is the greatest soundtrack ever produced for a PC game", adding that its disturbing ambience enhanced the suspense. GamePro likewise said the soundtrack complemented each stage and strengthened the overall mood. NIN issued the soundtrack on vinyl in 2020; reviewing it for Destructoid, Peter Glagowski argued that it showed the industry progressing beyond a child-oriented audience and dramatically intensified the action. Some releases of Quake lacked the soundtrack – the 2021 remaster includes it.

=== Engine ports ===
In late 1996, id released VQuake, a proprietary source port supporting hardware-accelerated rendering on graphics cards using the Rendition Vérité chipset. Besides improved performance, it offered 16-bit color, bilinear filtering, improved dynamic lighting, and optional anti-aliasing. After completing it, John Carmack vowed never to write a proprietary port again, citing frustration with Rendition's Speedy3D API.

To improve online play, id released QuakeWorld in December 1996, a build with revamped network code including client-side prediction. In the original game, later called NetQuake, the client displayed the results of a player's actions only after the server acknowledged them; this was acceptable on a LAN but caused noticeable lag over dial-up. John Carmack said the problem should have been fixed before release but went unnoticed because he and other developers had high-speed Internet at home. Prediction had a trade-off: other players could appear in slightly wrong positions, and a player could be pulled back to an earlier position when a late server reply overrode movement already performed, known as "warping" or "rubber-banding". Some players, especially in the United States, therefore still preferred NetQuake, but most preferred QuakeWorld, which soon became the dominant form of online play, and client-side prediction later became standard in real-time online games. Like other Quake upgrades it was free, and services like QuakeSpy helped players find public servers. Written by Carmack with John Cash and Christian Antkow, it was released on December 13, 1996, with the client following on December 17, and has been described by IGN as the first popular first-person shooter meant to be played online.

In January 1997, id released the first beta of GLQuake, which used the OpenGL API to render on hardware 3D accelerator cards rather than on the CPU. It offered higher framerates and resolutions, texture filtering, and experiments with reflections, transparent water, and rudimentary shadows. It shipped with a "MiniGL" driver enabling the OpenGL subset it used on the 3dfx Voodoo Graphics card, and it drove sales of 3D accelerators, particularly the Voodoo. Carmack, who had been frustrated by Rendition's proprietary API, championed OpenGL over Direct3D, citing ease of use and vendor lock-in.

In March 1997, id released WinQuake, a version of the non-OpenGL engine for Microsoft Windows. The DOS original could run on Windows 95 but not on later Windows NT-based systems because it needed direct access to hardware; WinQuake instead used Win32 APIs such as DirectSound, DirectInput, and DirectDraw, and also allowed higher resolutions.

In July 2016, Axel Gneiting, an id Tech employee who implemented the Vulkan rendering path of id Tech 6, released vkQuake, a Vulkan source port licensed under the GPLv2.

== Release ==
=== Marketing ===
Quake was marketed with the shareware approach id had perfected with Doom: the first episode circulated freely online and the rest of the game was sold to players who wanted it. Anticipation was high; a May 1996 profile described fans combing some 75 websites for news, and GameSpot's reviewer later said no unreleased game had attracted more hype. The shareware version was uploaded on June 22, 1996, and the full game began shipping to customers who ordered directly from id on July 22.

For players without Internet access, id released a retail shareware disc before the full retail distribution by GT Interactive. The May 1996 profile reported plans to ship 500,000 discs at a nominal price, with the rest of the game unlocked by credit-card order over a toll-free number. The disc was announced on July 3 and reached stores such as CompUSA and Computer City on August 30, 1996; it also carried encrypted copies of id's earlier games, including Doom, Heretic, and Hexen, that could be unlocked by phone. The shareware version contained a demo plus an encrypted full version of the game, and customers could purchase the decryption key over the phone without obtaining a separate physical copy. However, David Kushner in Masters of Doom says that "gamers wasted no time hacking the shareware to unlock the full version of the game for free" and hackers defeated the encryption scheme quickly, with one such tool being released and spread 39 days later. This problem, combined with the scale of the operation, led id to cancel the plan, leaving it with 150,000 unsold shareware copies.

=== Sales ===
Kushner remarked that the game's early "sales were good – with 250,000 units shipped – but not a phenomenon like Doom II." In the United States, Quake placed sixth on PC Data's monthly computer game sales charts for November and December 1996. Its shareware edition was the sixth-best-selling computer game of 1996 overall, while its retail SKU claimed 20th place. The shareware version sold 393,575 copies and grossed $3,005,519 (~$5.69 million in 2025) in the United States during 1996. It remained in PC Data's monthly top 10 from January to April 1997, (Note: Attributed to multiple sources:) but was absent by May. During its first 12 months, it sold 373,000 retail copies and earned $18 million in the United States, according to PC Data, and its final retail sales for 1997 were 273,936 copies, the country's 16th-highest for the year. In 1997, id estimated that as many as five million copies of the game were circulating, and it had sold over 1.4 million copies by December 1997 and 550,000 units in the United States alone by December 1999.

=== Ports ===
Quake was ported to multiple platforms. The first port completed was a Linux version of the shareware by id employee Dave D. Taylor using X11, released on July 5, 1996. An SVGAlib port created by Greg Alexander in 1997 from leaked source code was later mainlined by id, unlike similar unofficial ports for OS/2, Amiga, Java, and Mac OS. IBM distributed a shareware port for its AIX RS/6000 systems. In 1999, a retail version of the Linux port was distributed by Macmillan Digital Publishing USA in a bundle with the two existing add-ons as Quake: The Offering. (Note: Attributed to multiple sources:)

The first commercially released port was for Mac OS, by MacSoft and Lion Entertainment, Inc. (which closed just before release, leading to MacSoft's involvement), in late August 1997. ClickBOOM released a version for Amiga computers in 1998, and R-Comp Interactive published Quake Resurrection for RISC OS in 1999, bundling the total conversion Malice and the expansion Q!Zone, though community ports such as ArcQuake were also available.

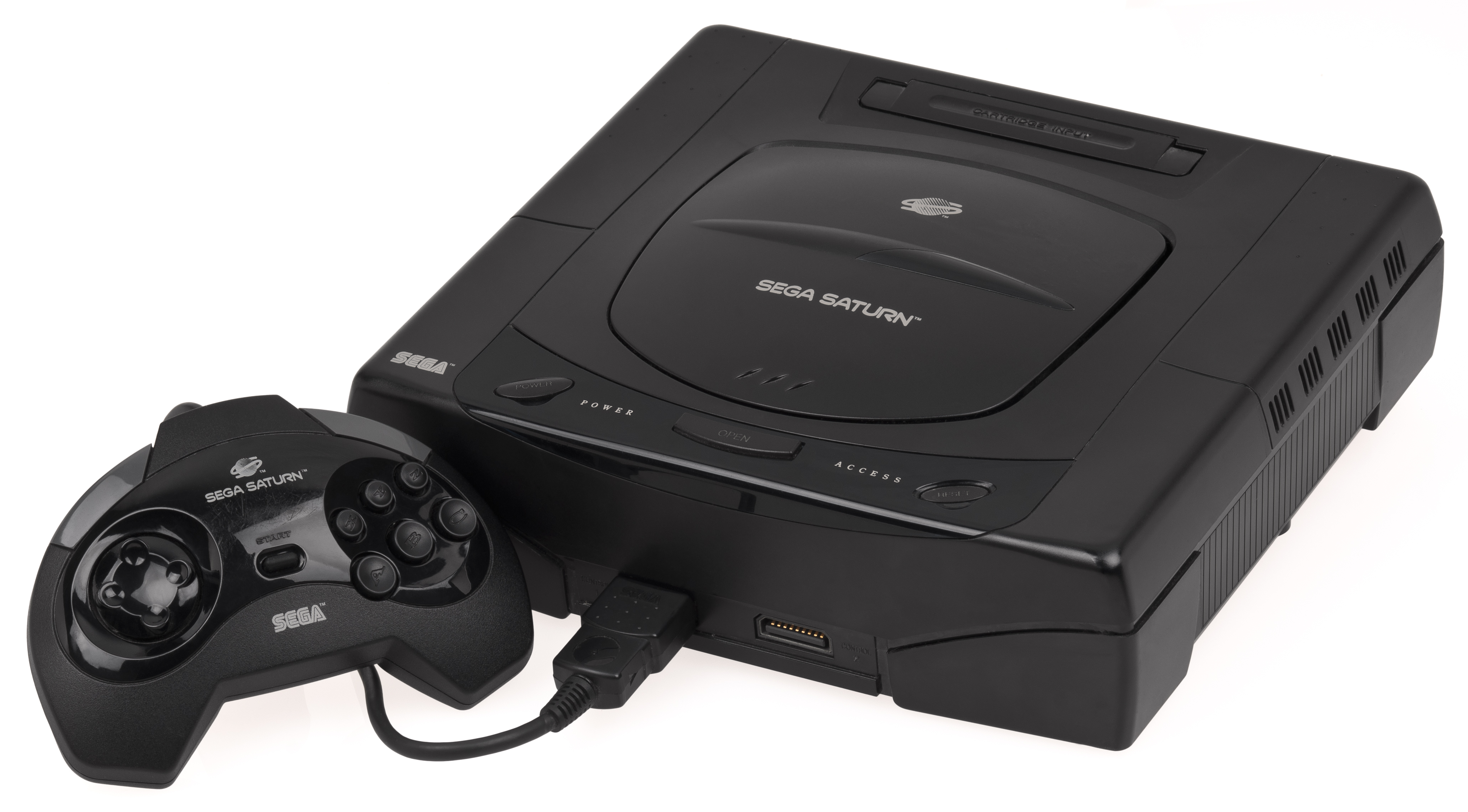
The Sega Saturn received a port of Quake in 1997.

The game was also ported to home consoles. The Sega Saturn version was released on December 2, 1997. GT Interactive was initially to publish it, but cancelled the release and the Saturn rights were picked up by Sega. Sega took the project from the original team, who were struggling to reach a decent frame rate, and assigned it to Lobotomy Software. The port was developed with Softimage 3D and uses Lobotomy's 3D engine, SlaveDriver, also used in PowerSlave and Duke Nukem 3D for the Saturn. Lobotomy also ported Quake to the PlayStation, but could not find a publisher. A Jaguar port was reported as 30% complete in a May 1996 issue of Ultimate Future Games but was never released, and a port was planned for the Panasonic M2 before the system's cancellation.

The Nintendo 64 version, Quake 64, was released on March 24, 1998 by Midway Games. It was developed by the team that worked on Doom 64, at id's request, and was delayed from 1997 to allow time to implement the deathmatch modes. Its soundtrack was composed by Aubrey Hodges. Both console ports required compromises because of limited CPU power and ROM space; levels were rebuilt in the Saturn version to simplify their geometry. In 1998, LBE Systems and Lazer-Tron released a prototype titled Quake: Arcade Tournament Edition for a limited number of arcade systems.

An unreleased Game Boy Advance port by Randy Linden was pitched to id Software in 2002 and rejected; prototypes were dumped in June 2022. Since the source code was released in 1999, unofficial ports have appeared for devices such as the Pocket PC and Symbian S60 phones. In 2005, id signed a deal with publisher Pulse Interactive for a mobile version engineered by Bear Naked Productions. Quake Mobile, released in October 2005 and reviewed by GameSpot on the Samsung Nexus, was initially due on only two phones, the Nexus and the LG VX360, but in practice runs only on the Dell X50V and X51V. It runs at 25 fps and includes the first two expansion packs, but omits the Nine Inch Nails soundtrack due to space constraints.

At the launch of the 2021 QuakeCon event on August 19, 2021, Bethesda unveiled an "enhanced" remastered version developed by Nightdive Studios for Microsoft Windows, Nintendo Switch, PlayStation 4, and Xbox One, and later the PlayStation 5 and Xbox Series X/S. It runs on the KEX Engine and, in addition to support for modern systems and improved rendering, includes both mission packs and later expansion packs, with the new expansion Dimension of the Machine released alongside it. A complete port of Quake 64 is accessible via the new "Add-On" menu, where mods and expansions can be managed. (Note: Attributed to multiple sources:) The PlayStation 5 and Xbox Series X/S versions followed in October 2021.

=== Expansions ===
Shortly after Quake's release, official expansions added new campaigns with new levels, enemies, and soundtracks. The first were called "mission packs" (MP).

==== Mission packs ====
The first, Quake Mission Pack 1: Scourge of Armagon, was developed by Hipnotic Interactive (which became Ritual Entertainment) and released on March 5, 1997. It features three new episodes with 15 levels, additional enemies, new weapons (Mjolnir, laser cannon, proximity bomb), and a soundtrack composed by Jeehun Hwang. Computer Gaming World rated it 8.90/10, saying that "the levels were better in Armagon than in Quake, and the deathmatch level was arguably the best we have ever seen."

The second, Quake Mission Pack 2: Dissolution of Eternity, was developed by Rogue Entertainment and released on March 19, 1997, two weeks after the first. Its two episodes, Hell's Fortress and The Corridors of Time, contain 16 levels in total; the first applies Quake's wizard and runic themes, while the second uses a new Egyptian theme. It adds seven new standard enemies, seven bosses, and four weapons, (Note: A fifth weapon, the grappling hook, is only available in Capture the Flag mode.) and its soundtrack was also composed by Jeehun Hwang. Computer Gaming World rated it slightly higher than the first pack, at 8.95/10.

==== Later expansions ====
After the two mission packs, additional content dwindled as development focus shifted to Quake II. However, new DLC emerged following anniversaries.

On June 24, 2016, around the game's 20th anniversary, MachineGames released the free expansion Dimension of the Past, with relatively little marketing or critical attention. It titles itself the game's fifth episode, and later packs, also free, are presented as subsequent episodes.

Dimension of the Machine, also by MachineGames, was released on August 19, 2021 alongside the remaster. In this sixth episode, Ranger seeks runes from five new worlds to power a machine to stop Chthon, the boss of the original game's first episode.

To commemorate Quake's 30th anniversary at that year's QuakeCon, MachineGames and id released the fifth expansion and seventh episode, Dawn of the Machine, on August 6, 2026. It has 19 levels and gameplay elements not present in the original: secrets and upgrades that grant upgraded weapons or increase Ranger's ammo capacity or maximum health, and a replayable hub from which previous levels are revisited to open new sections and collect the remaining runes. New enemies include dogs with grenades strapped to their backs, ogres with rocket launchers, and a "Blood Shambler", and a difficulty above Nightmare, "Bloody Nightmare", is secretly present. Critics noted its stronger focus on plot than earlier packs: Bethesda's announcement describes Ranger as trapped in an endless illusory dimension, and he must find and destroy the "Nightmare Machine" to escape. Dawn of the Machine received positive reception for its gameplay, level design, and plot. Digital Foundry's William Judd wrote that it's "a masterclass in balance too, successfully capturing the essence of classic Quake".

== Reception ==
Reception

Aggregate scores
Aggregator	Score
GameRankings	PC: 93% N64: 76%
Metacritic	PC: 94/100; N64: 74/100

Review scores
Publication	Score
AllGame	3.5/5 (SAT)
Computer Games Magazine	5/5
Computer and Video Games	5/5
Electronic Gaming Monthly	6.5/10 (SAT); 8.0/10 (N64)
GameFan	275/300 (SAT)
GameRevolution	9/10
GameSpot	9.3/10 (PC); 6.4/10 (SAT); 6.9/10 (N64)
IGN	8/10 (N64)
Next Generation	5/5 (PC); 4/5 (MAC); 3/5 (SAT); 3/5 (N64); 3/5 (ARC)
PC Gamer (UK)	90/100

Quake was critically acclaimed on the PC. Trent Ward of GameSpot scored it 9.3 out of 10 and said it lived up to the unusually heavy hype that had preceded it; he praised its fully three-dimensional environments, smooth animation and atmosphere, and said the deathmatch maps rewarded skill rather than luck, while noting that the new control scheme took time to learn and a three-button mouse was close to essential. Other early reviews were more measured. PC Gamer gave it 90% but said it was unlikely to transform action games, calling it a very good shooter from the creators of the genre, and GamePro judged it over-hyped but excellent, criticizing the visibly blocky polygons of enemies at close range. Next Generation gave it five stars out of five, praising its 3D physics and "unnerving" sound effects, and Computer Games Magazine and Computer and Video Games also gave it 5 out of 5. GameRevolution gave it a 9/10. Entertainment Weekly gave it a B+, with Bob Strauss identifying the graphics, audio design, and amount of violent action as its three major improvements over Doom. Next Generation rated the Macintosh version four stars out of five, saying that although replay value was limited, "there's no doubt that Quake and its engine are something powerful and addictive." Metacritic lists nine reviews of the PC version, giving it a 94/100.

Reviews for the Nintendo 64 port were positive, although not as high as for the PC version. Critics praised its lighting effects (Note: Attributed to multiple sources:) and smooth frame rate in single-player mode. (Note: Attributed to multiple sources:) IGN judged the visuals superior to those of the unaccelerated PC version despite the simplified environments, concluding that "The Nintendo 64 version of Quake is exceptionally well done, but it's still the same game." GamePro asserted that the lighting and colors were as clean as GLQuake's, while Next Generation concluded that although it did not live up to the 3D-accelerated PC version, it was still an entertaining shooter. Most reviews faulted the multiplayer for frame-rate drops, some levels being too large for two players, and the lack of four-player support offered by Hexen: Beyond Heretic and GoldenEye 007, (Note: Attributed to multiple sources:) though Next Generation noted that four players would have severely compromised performance on the hardware, and GameSpot found the multiplayer fun and quicker to set up than on PC. Reviewers differed over the controls: Electronic Gaming Monthly, IGN, and GamePro found them precise and intuitive, (Note: Attributed to multiple sources:) while GameSpot and Next Generation felt they required fiddling and fell short of a keyboard and mouse. Reviews generally concluded that the port would not appeal to Quake veterans, given its multiplayer shortcomings and lack of exclusive content, but was a strong enough contender for non-PC gamers. (Note: Attributed to multiple sources:)

The Saturn version received mixed reviews, as critics generally agreed it did not bring over the elements that make the game enjoyable. In particular, critics reviled the absence of multiplayer, which they felt had eclipsed the campaign as the main reason to play. (Note: Attributed to multiple sources:) Electronic Gaming Monthly's Kraig Kujawa wrote that "Quake is not a great one-player game – it gained its notoriety on the Net as a multiplayer", and co-reviewer Sushi-X concluded, "Without multiplayer, I'd pass." Most reviews also found the controls much worse than the PC original, particularly aiming without a mouse or second thumb stick, (Note: Attributed to multiple sources:) and GamePro noted graphics so pixelated and blurry that newcomers could not discern what they were looking at, concluding that the port "certainly doesn't live up to its PC heritage". Most critics did find it technically impressive, particularly the added light sources, (Note: Attributed to multiple sources:) but Next Generation replied that porting Quake to a console was "nothing more than an excuse for bragging rights". Sega Saturn Magazine's Rich Leadbetter, who gave the port a higher 92%, acknowledged it as a dancing bear, arguing that "the machine has no right to be doing this!" GameSpot felt the lack of plot made the campaign too shallow to appeal to most gamers, and most critics compared the port unfavorably to the Saturn version of Duke Nukem 3D, mainly in terms of gameplay. (Note: Attributed to multiple sources:) Next Generation also gave the arcade version three stars out of five, calling it "a blast" for those without LAN or Internet capabilities.

=== Remastered version ===
Remastered reception

Aggregate scores
Aggregator	Score
Metacritic	PC: 81/100; XSXS: 85/100; PS4: 87/100; NS: 87/100
OpenCritic	100% recommend

Review scores
Publication	Score
Destructoid	9/10 (PC, NS)
Nintendo Life	10/10 (NS)
Push Square	8/10 (PS4)

Reviews of the remaster were similarly positive to the PC's, with most critics noting that the already-excellent game needed few, if any, substantial changes. Metacritic rated it 81/100 on PC, 85/100 on Xbox, and 87/100 on both PlayStation 4 and Nintendo Switch, and on OpenCritic it has a 100% Critics Recommend rating from 37 reviews. Destructoid's Zoey Handley praised the updated weapon and enemy models and the option to use the original models, calling the port "a solid effort" and "still a great game". Nintendo Life called the Switch version the definitive one, praising its feature-packed port that preserves the original's look and feel, its smooth performance in docked and handheld mode, and its many graphics and multiplayer options.

=== Accolades ===
In September 1996, Next Generation placed Quake ninth in its "Top 100 Games of All Time", a month before its review. Computer Gaming World ranked it the 36th-best computer game in 1996, and PC Gamer ranked it 28th in 1998, its editors calling it "one of the most addictive, adaptable, and pulse-pounding 3D shooters ever created". GameSpot added it to its list of the greatest games of all time in 2003. At the 1997 Game Developers Choice Awards, Quake received spotlight awards for best sound effects, best music or soundtrack, and best online or Internet game.

In January 2007, the National Academy of Television Arts and Sciences honored id Software with a Technology & Engineering Emmy for the rendering technology of the Quake engine, and honored John Carmack for pioneering work on 3D game engines. A year later, Quake was one of three winners in the "user-generated content - game modification" category. In 2025, Quake was inducted into the World Video Game Hall of Fame.

In 2026, the expansion Dawn of the Machines was nominated for Best Game Expansion at the 44th Golden Joystick Awards.

== Legacy ==
Quake was primarily responsible for the emergence of machinima, films made in game engines, thanks to edited Quake demos such as Ranger Gone Bad and Blahbalicious, the in-game film The Devil's Covenant, and the four-hour epic The Seal of Nehahra.

The source code was released on December 22, 1999 under the GNU General Public License version 2. The levels, textures, sounds, and other creative works remain under their original proprietary license; the shareware distribution is still freely redistributable and usable with the now-libre engine, but a registered copy is needed to play the full game's single-player episodes, deathmatch maps, and other registered-only content. Microsoft's Windows Terminal includes a secret "Quake mode", activated by suffixing a tab's name with '_quake', in which the window snaps to the top half of the screen like Quake's drop-down command console.

Due to conflicts and burnout, most of the original team left id after the game's release, including Romero, who had planned to leave after Quake and whose resignation the other co-founders requested in August 1996. Petersen cited three problems: constant crunch, the lack of a central, guiding designer, and internal rivalry, and said that John Carmack had rejected his offer to act as producer. Romero and Carmack remained civil but distant. In 2000, Romero released Daikatana, the game that he envisioned Quake being, which in addition to its shaky development, became regarded as one of the worst games of all time.

=== Speedrunning ===
Quake is a popular medium for speedrunning, helped by its demo system, which lets runners record runs that anyone can replay and verify. Most full-game speedruns are collaborative efforts in which each level is run by one player, but ideas and techniques are shared so that records keep improving; thousands of individual level runs, including many on custom maps, are kept in Speed Demos Archive's Quake section. A complete speedrun of the game, Quake done Quick, was compiled from demos in which all levels were completed in record time on the hardest "Nightmare" skill level by various players; the continuous 19 minutes, 49 seconds run was released on June 10, 1997. The game has continued to see speedrun attempts well past its release.

=== Modding ===
Like Doom, Quake and id Software supported and encouraged third-party and player modifications. Levels, sounds, textures, and other content were kept separate from the engine, similar to Doom's WAD approach, and the game's mechanics and behavior could be rewritten through QuakeC, a C-like programming language designed for use within Quake. Soon after release, players created and shared their own levels and adjustments online, and level editors and other tools were developed, such as TrenchBroom.

=== Sequels ===
The success of Quake spawned the Quake series, whose mainline sequels are Quake II, Quake III Arena, Quake 4, Quake Live, and Quake Champions, but the sequels do not share the first game's universe. After the departure of Sandy Petersen, id substantially changed the thematic direction for Quake II, making it more technological and futuristic rather than Lovecraftian; Quake II began as a separate product line, and id fell back on the "Quake" name because its fast-paced, tactile feel was closer to a Quake game than to a new franchise. In June 2011, John Carmack remarked that id was considering going back to the "...mixed up Cthulhu-ish Quake 1 world and rebooting [in] that direction."

=== Content debates ===
Quake drew criticism for its intense graphic violence, including blood effects, gore, and dismemberment, fueling the debates sparked by Doom. The Entertainment Software Rating Board (ESRB), established in 1994, rated Quake "Mature" for players 17 and older, and the game remained part of broader 1990s concerns about video game violence and its potential effects on young players. The controversy intensified after the 1999 Columbine High School massacre, when reports noted that the perpetrators were fans of id Software games, including Quake II and Doom. This led to renewed media scrutiny and political calls to regulate violent video games, with critics arguing that such titles may desensitize players to real-world violence or contribute to aggression. In response, John Carmack said id focused on making games they personally enjoyed: "We make the games we like to play and throw them out into the world... We don't get involved in politics". Defenders within the industry and among players argued that no direct causal link existed between game violence and real-world behavior.
