= Dennis Fong =

American professional esports player (born 1977)

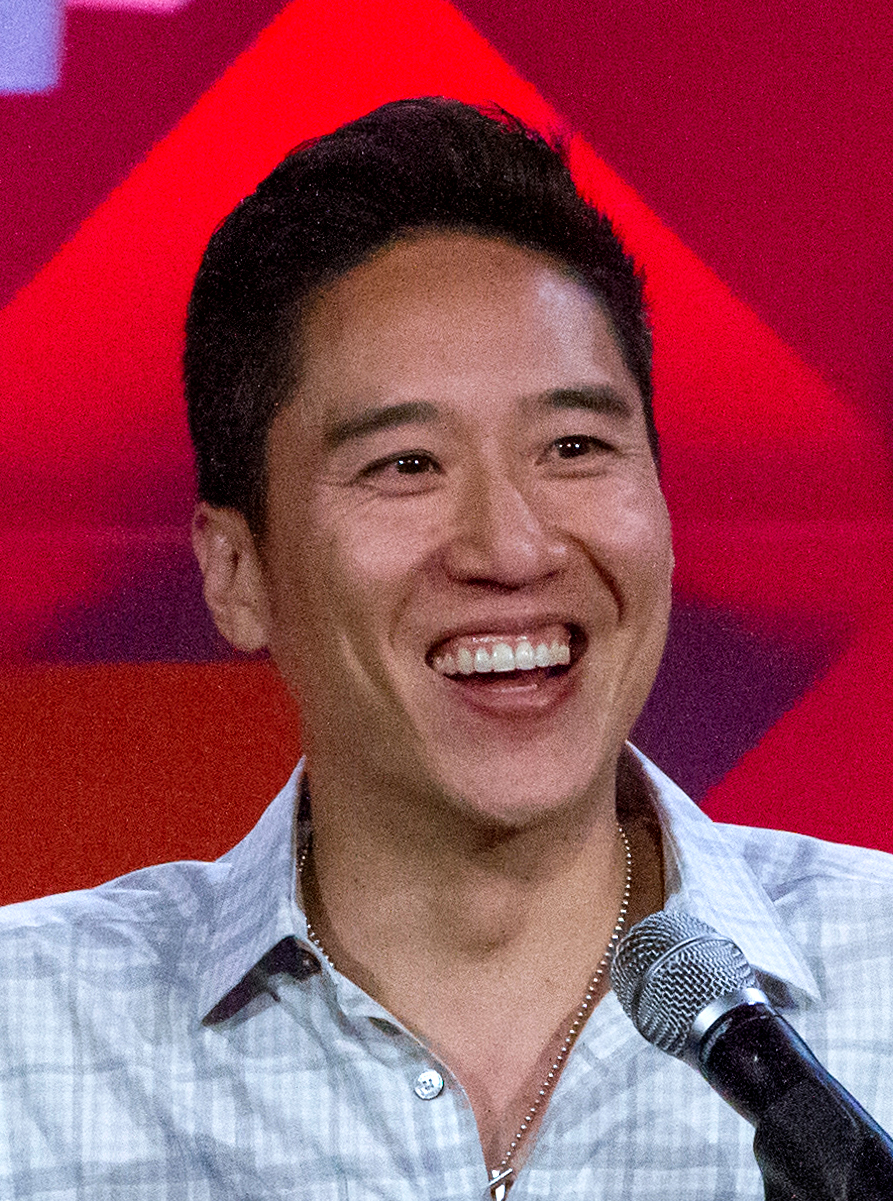
- Thresh at QuakeCon 2016

Personal information
- Nickname: Thresh
- Born: March 11, 1977 (age 49); British Hong Kong
- Nationality: American

Career information
- Games: Quake; Doom
- Playing career: 1995–1997

Dennis Fong (traditional Chinese: 方鏞欽; simplified Chinese: 方镛钦; pinyin: Fāng Yōngqīn; Jyutping: fong1 jung4 jam1; born March 11, 1977), better known by his online alias Thresh, is an American businessman and retired professional player of the first-person shooter video games Quake and Doom. He is a co-founder of Xfire, an instant messenger and social networking site for gamers, which was acquired by Viacom for US$102 million in April 2006. He also co-founded Lithium Technologies, a social customer relationship management (CRM) company. In his playing career his highest profile victory came in 1997 at the Red Annihilation Quake tournament, where he placed first and won id Software CEO John Carmack's Ferrari 328. Fong is recognized by the Guinness World Records as the first professional gamer.

== Career ==
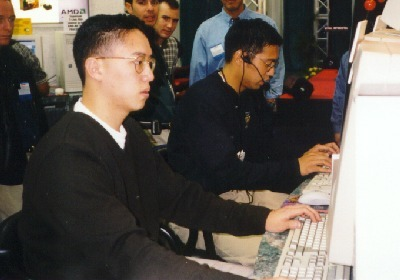
Thresh (foreground) at a video game competition for a vendor at Comdex in 1997

=== Playing career ===
Fong began playing Doom at the age of 16 in 1993. He first chose the pseudonym "Threshold of Pain", which referred to the ability to withstand enemy fire and suffering. However, as many games had an eight-character ID limit, he went with "Thresh" and liked the word's meaning of "to strike repeatedly".

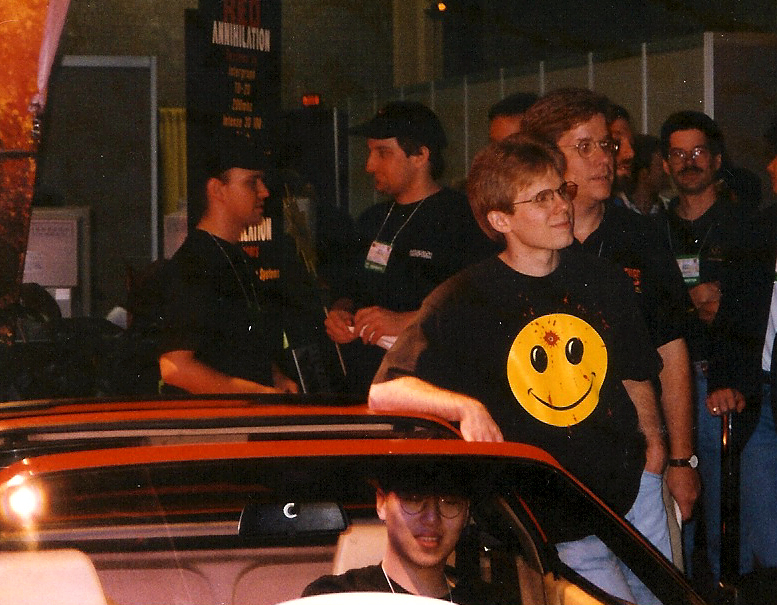
Thresh in the Ferrari he won. John Carmack stands to the right, and second-place finisher Entropy is in the background above Thresh.

Fong attended the Microsoft-sponsored Doom tournament Judgment Day 1995 in Seattle and defeated Ted "Merlock" Peterson to finish first among 24 competitors from across the US and United Kingdom.

The highlight of his gaming career was at the Red Annihilation tournament in 1997. He and Tom "Entropy" Kimzey emerged from a crowded field to face off in the Quake level E1M2 "Castle of the Damned", where Thresh defeated Entropy 14 to -1.

At the peak of his gaming career in the middle to late 1990s, he earned approximately $100,000 (~$186,011 in 2025) a year from prize money and endorsements. He retired in 2000 to focus on his business ventures in addition to developing carpal tunnel syndrome.

On July 27, 2016, Thresh was the second person to be inducted into the ESL Hall of Fame.

=== Business ventures ===
Fong and his brother Lyle started GX Media in 1996, the parent company of Gamers.com, FiringSquad, and Lithium Technologies. Fong was the CEO of the company and Lyle was the chief technical officer. The company grew to 130 employees by 2000.

In 1999, GX Media raised over US$11 million from CMGI and built gamers.com, a popular web portal. Fong's Ferrari was parked in the lobby of the GX Media offices. In 2001, gamers.com was acquired by Ziff-Davis.

While running GX Media, Fong was also editor-in-chief at the video gaming site FiringSquad, wrote a monthly column in the popular PC Gamer magazine and co-authored the official Quake II strategy guide with Jonathan Mendoza and Kenn Spear Hwang.

GX Media spun off Lithium Technologies, a leading Social CRM platform provider that counts AT&T, PlayStation, Verizon, Comcast and Best Buy as some of its customers. The company has raised over $40 million from Benchmark Capital, Emergence Capital, Shasta Ventures, DAG Ventures and Tenaya Capital.

Fong went on to co-found Xfire, an instant messaging client designed for online gaming, that was acquired by Viacom in April 2006 for US$102 million. In 2007, Fong founded Raptr, a social network and related software client for gamers. The company has raised over $12 million in financing from Accel Partners.

In May 2021, Fong backed Bright Star Studios in a $2 million investment deal for the company's massively multiplayer online sandbox game Ember Sword.

Fong serves as an adviser for WeGame.com Inc and previously served in the same capacity for the defunct Booyah, Inc.

== Playing style ==
Fong was known for his reflexes, intuition and tactics while playing. People coined the term "Thresh ESP" to describe his unnatural knack for knowing exactly what his opponents were doing. In 1 on 1 deathmatch, he made it a priority to understand the level and "control" vital items using timed runs to repeatedly hoard them from opponents, such as the rocket launcher and armor in Quake.

Fong has been credited with popularizing the WASD key configuration commonly used in PC gaming.

== Personal life ==
Fong was born in Hong Kong on March 11, 1977 and lived in Beijing for a while. His parents, David and Lena Fong, were educated in America and are United States citizens. He and his family emigrated to the United States when he was 11 years old, and he grew up in Los Altos, California. His interests include playing roller hockey. Fong has two younger brothers, Lyle and Bryant.

== See also ==
- DWANGO
