= Evo Moment 37 =

2004 competitive Street Fighter highlight

Evo Moment #37 (Daigo Parry) at the Evolution Championship Series 2004 (Evo 2004)
- Screenshot of Evo Moment #37, showing Umehara (Ken) parrying the first hit of Wong (Chun-Li)'s Super Art
- Venue: California State Polytechnic University, Pomona
- Location: Pomona, California
- Date: August 1, 2004
- Competitors: Daigo Umehara, Justin Wong

"Evo Moment #37", or the "Daigo Parry", is a portion of a Street Fighter III: 3rd Strike semifinal match held at Evolution Championship Series 2004 (Evo 2004) between Daigo Umehara and Justin Wong. During this match, Umehara made an unexpected comeback by countering 15 consecutive hits of Wong's "Super Art" move with only one remaining unit of health. Umehara subsequently won the match, though he went on to lose the Grand Final against Kenji "KO" Obata. Evo Moment #37 has been described as the most iconic moment in competitive video gaming, having influenced the fighting game community strongly.

== Background ==
The Street Fighter III: 3rd Strike finals of Evo 2004 took place at California State Polytechnic University, Pomona on August 1. Daigo "The Beast" Umehara and Justin Wong, two of the best Street Fighter players at the time, had never played against one another until that point. Despite this, the two were already known for having a supposed rivalry with each other due to their differences in gaming philosophies. Street Fighter was the only game to still be played on traditional arcade cabinets at this Evo, all other games being played on home consoles. Umehara and Wong met one another in the loser's finals of the tournament. Here, Umehara opted to play using Ken, while Wong picked Chun-Li.

== The moment ==
In the final round of match one, after each player had won a round, Umehara got off to a weak start as Wong was playing conservatively, slowly chipping away on Umehara's life bar. Rolling Stone described Wong's behavior during this match as "the antithesis of Umehara's aggressive approach" and stated that video of the match shows that Wong's turtling was effective in "getting under his [Umehara's] skin." Match commentator and Capcom employee Seth Killian commentated that "this is rare footage of Daigo actually angry ... Justin's turtle-style now on the verge of putting Daigo down." Umehara's Ken was down to his last unit of health. With 26 seconds remaining, Wong had the option to run out the clock, but he was eager to end the match.

At this point, any special attack would knock Umehara's character out if it connected, since special attacks deal a slight amount of damage even when blocked. To win the round, Wong attempted to hit Umehara's Ken with Chun-Li's Super Art II move, able to hit multiple times; the Hoyokusen (鳳翼扇, hōyokusen; "Phoenix Wing Fan"). During the move's startup animation, a spectator is heard shouting "Let's go, Justin!" However, instead of avoiding it, Umehara chose to "Parry", a high-risk, high-reward technique which allows the defender to deflect an incoming attack without losing any health, but requires moving toward the opponent's direction in the same time a hit lands, within six frames (0.1 seconds at 60 frames per second) of the impact animation. Umehara had to predict when his opponent would start his Super Art Move, essentially making the first parry before the move even started, and then perform the same split-second timing on all 14 of the remaining hits. Umehara did so successfully, and went on to counter a final kick of Chun-Li in mid-air before launching a 12-hit combo, capped by Ken's Super Art III; Shippu Jinraikyaku (疾風迅雷脚, shippū jinraikyaku; "Hurricane Swift Thunder Leg"), winning the match.

GamePro and Eurogamer pointed out how the moment was elevated by the "euphoric" reaction of the crowd, which erupted in cheers and shouts as Umehara parried Wong's moves and turned the game around. Umehara went on to lose in the Grand Final to Kenji "KO" Obata, playing as Yun.

== Spread ==
One of the tournament organizers and the primary ring announcer, Ben Cureton, was asked to create a highlight video of the "Daigo Parry" after the tournament was completed. Cureton uploaded the video under the title "Evo Moment #37", picking an arbitrary two-digit number to represent the highlight. In the book Evo Moment #37, Glenn Cravens wrote that:

Obviously, it's the No. 1 highlight, but in picking a number like 37, it would signal to the viewer who wasn't there that there were many incredible moments like the "Daigo parry." He wanted to make sure people didn't miss out on Evolution 2005 coming next year.

A previously unnoticed recording of the match was discovered by Evo business developer and Tekken brand and community advisor Mark "MarkMan" Julio in 2019, lying amid a stack of old tapes and discs. Recorded by Ace R., this video is filmed from a different viewpoint and includes distinct live reactions of the people in the crowd. MarkMan uploaded this video on YouTube in April 2019.

== Legacy ==
It's a rite of passage and your introduction video to the entire community. It sparked an entire generation of believers and players and continues to do so 12 years later.

— Timothy Lee, ABC News

Evo Moment #37 is frequently described as the most iconic and memorable moment in the history of competitive video gaming. Being at one point the most-watched competitive gaming moment of all time, Kotaku compared it to sports moments such as Babe Ruth's called shot and the Miracle on Ice.

In an interview with John Guerrero of EventHubs, Justin Wong stated that he believed Evo Moment #37 may have helped "save" the fighting game community, which was becoming less active at the time. Umehara gave a more in-depth account of the match in his 2016 autobiography, in which he explains how he briefly departed from the fighting game community afterwards.

The downloadable online version of 3rd Strike, Street Fighter III: 3rd Strike Online Edition, features a challenge where players need to pull off the Daigo Parry. A parody of Evo Moment #37 was presented in the 2012 anime adaption of Acchi Kocchi. In 2014, Umehara and Wong held a rematch as a celebration of Evo Moment #37 ten years prior, in which Wong once again attempted to chip Umehara out with Chun-Li's special move. Umehara successfully parried Chun-Li's special move again, but Wong had enough vitality left to win the round a few seconds later. Glenn Cravens wrote a self-published book titled EVO Moment 37 that year as well.

By 2016, Evo Moment #37 had been viewed more than 30 million times, making it one of the most-watched tournament highlights of all time. In a friendly match during 2016, British Street Fighter player Ryan Hart notably pulled off Daigo's parry while not looking at the TV screen.

2018's Super Smash Bros. Ultimate features Ken as a playable character, with the Shippu Jinraikyaku available as one of his Final Smashes. In his reveal trailer, Ken parries an attack from Punch-Out!!'s Little Mac before immediately countering with his Final Smash, referencing the iconic moment.

In 2024, 20 years after Evo Moment #37, a 3rd Strike tournament was confirmed for that year's EVO. To promote the event, a short skit was made featuring Wong and Umehara. Wong, at a Chipotle Mexican Grill location, asks Umehara over the phone if he wants extra guacamole on his order, to which Umehara responds that he can "handle something with a little more kick." A clip of the moment then plays, followed by an unamused Wong hanging up and leaving the restaurant. During the 3rd Strike tournament, a match between "Hayao" as Hugo and Franklin "FrankieBFG" Nunez as Ken ended with Hayao, down to his last pixel of health, midair-parrying Ken's multi-hitting Tatsumaki Senpukyaku and using Hugo's dropkick, a notoriously weak attack, to dodge Ken's Shippuu Jinraikyaku, allowing him an opening to attack and win the match. The commentators reacted with shock and excitement, with one, Justin Wong, exclaiming "Do you understand? That is a worthless button!" The moment was similarly hailed, with some commentators nicknaming it "Evo Moment #38".

== See also ==
- Umehara ga kimeta
