= List of Street Fighter Grand Slam champions =

This article details the list of Street Fighter video game's Grand Slam tournaments champions of the modern era. The first Grand Slam tournament included was EVO 2009, which was the first major tournament of Street Fighter IV. Since then, the first Capcom Cup started in 2013, the first Red Bull Kumite started in 2015, and the first EVO Japan started in 2018. 26 players have won at least one grand slam.

== Champions by player ==
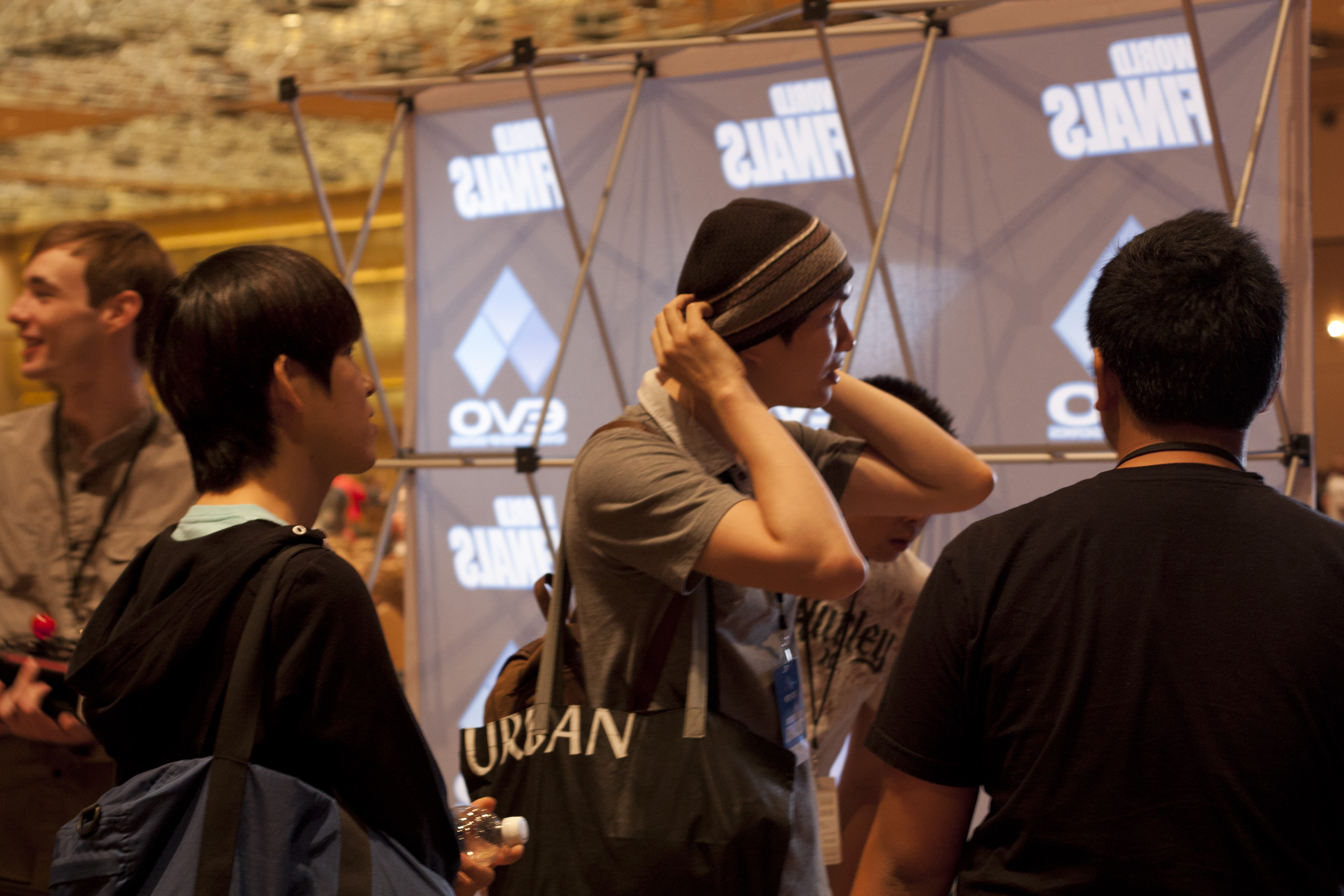
MenaRD have 5 major titles, an all-time record. MenaRD won 2 Capcom Cups, one Red Bull Kumite and two EVO Japans.

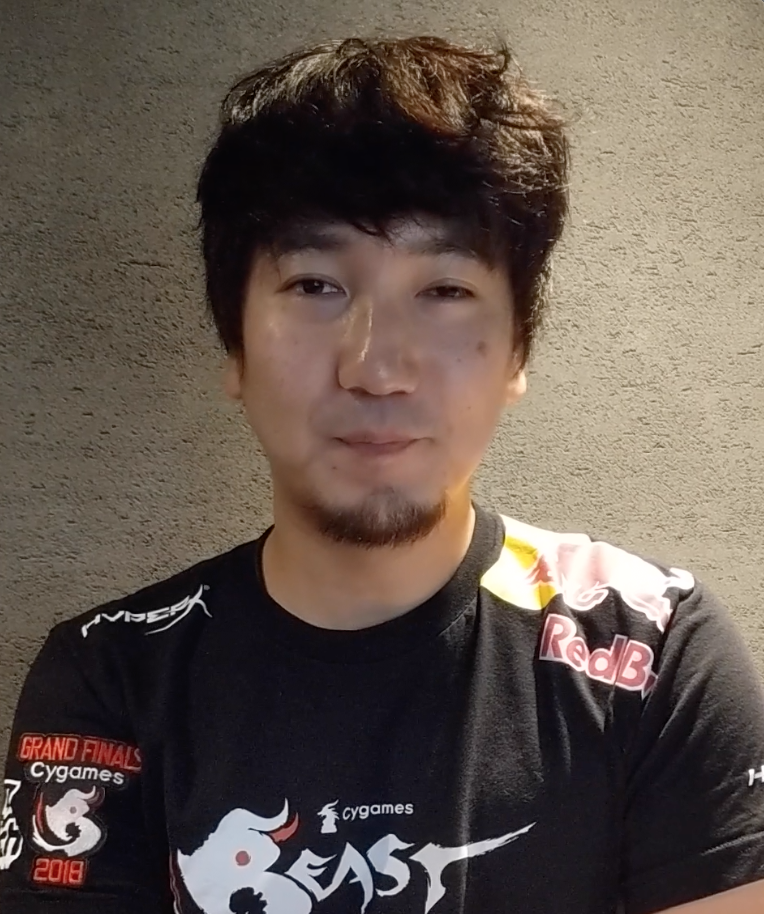
Daigo was the first ever Grand Slam champion, winning EVO in 2009. He also won back to back EVOs the following year.

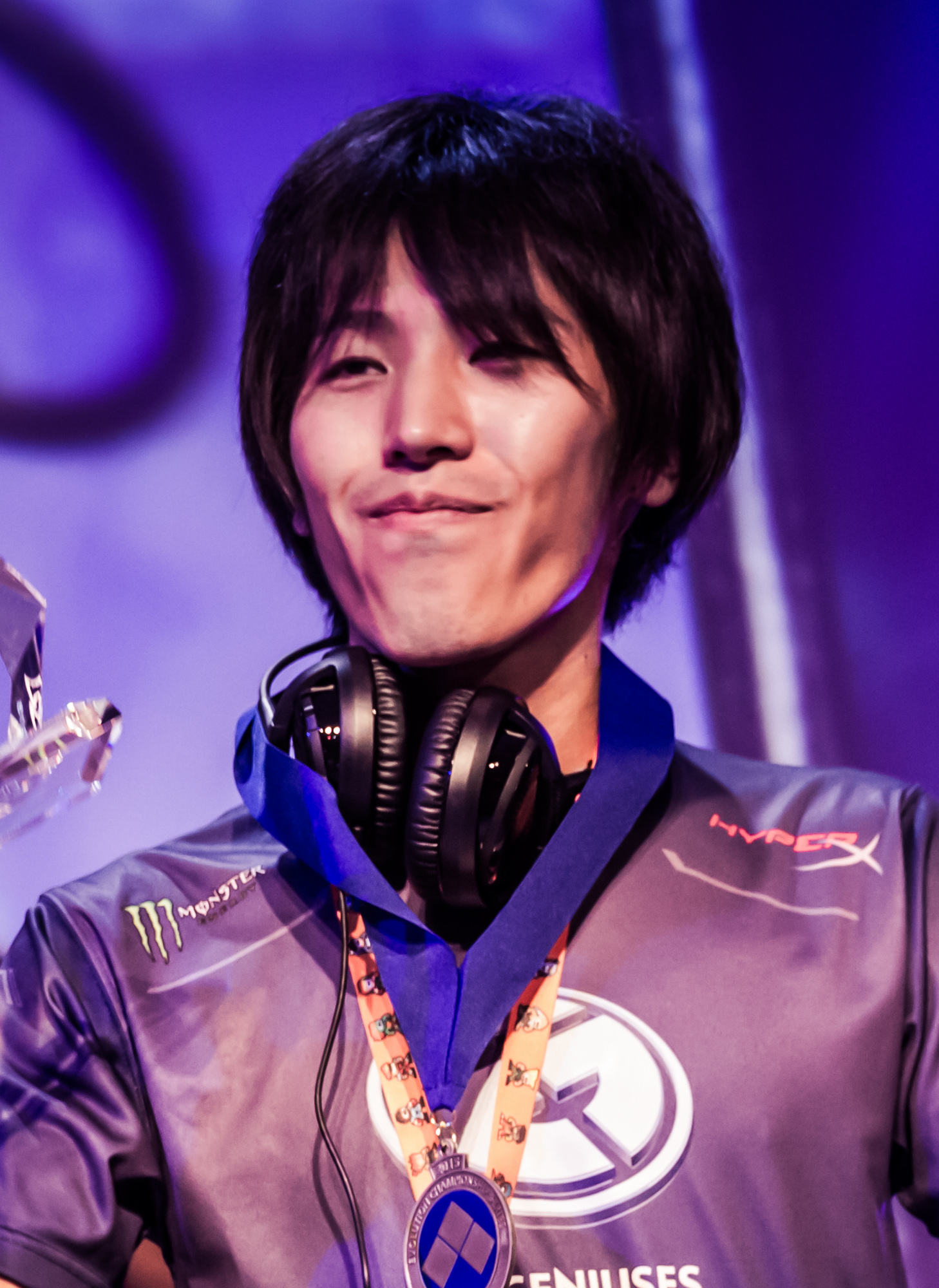
Momochi was the only player to win EVO and Capcom Cup within a year.

| Year | EVO Japan | Red Bull Kumite | EVO | Capcom Cup |
|---|---|---|---|---|
| 2009 | ↓ Street Fighter IV ↓ | | | |
| 2009 | tournament not created | tournament not created | Daigo Umehara (1/2) | tournament not created |
| 2010 | tournament not created | tournament not created | Daigo Umehara (2/2) | tournament not created |
| 2011 | tournament not created | tournament not created | Fuudo (1/1) | tournament not created |
| 2012 | tournament not created | tournament not created | Infiltration (1/4) | tournament not created |
| 2013 | tournament not created | tournament not created | Xian (1/1) | Sako (1/1) |
| 2014 | tournament not created | tournament not created | Luffy (1/1) | Momochi (1/3) |
| 2015 | tournament not created | Bonchan (1/2) | Momochi (2/3) | Kazunoko (1/1) |
| 2016 | ↓ Street Fighter V ↓ | | | |
| 2016 | tournament not created | Infiltration (2/4) | Infiltration (3/4) | NuckleDu (1/1) |
| 2017 | tournament not created | Nemo (1/1) | Tokido (1/1) | MenaRD (1/5) |
| 2018 | Infiltration (4/4) | Fujimura (1/2) (Note: Red Bull Kumite held their tournament each year irregularly, mostly before EVO and Capcom Cup. However the tournament was held after EVO in 2018 and even after Capcom Cup in 2019.) | Problem-X (1/2) | Gachikun (1/1) |
| 2019 | Momochi (3/3) | Fujimura (2/2) | Bonchan (2/2) | iDom (1/1) |
| 2020 | Nauman (1/1) | cancelled (COVID-19 pandemic) | cancelled (COVID-19 pandemic) | cancelled (COVID-19 pandemic) |
| 2021 | cancelled (COVID-19 pandemic) | Mister Crimson (1/1) | cancelled (COVID-19 pandemic) | cancelled (COVID-19 pandemic) |
| 2022 | cancelled (COVID-19 pandemic) | Problem-X (2/2) (Note: In fact, Red Bull Kumite actually held two tournaments in 2021. Since they didn't have a tournament in 2022, the second tournament of 2021 would be counted as the 2022 edition since the order of the Grand Slam tournaments stayed the same.) | Kawano (1/1) | MenaRD (2/5) (Note: After the pandemic, specifically since 2022, Capcom Cup wasn't held in the actual calendar year, in fact was held in the beginning of the upcoming year.) |
| 2023 | Oil King (1/1) | ↓ Street Fighter 6 ↓ | | |
| 2023 | ↓ Street Fighter 6 ↓ | Big Bird (1/2) | AngryBird (1/1) | UMA (1/1) |
| 2024 | MenaRD (4/5) | MenaRD (3/5) (Note: Red Bull Kumite was held before EVO Japan.) | Punk (1/1) | Kakeru (1/1) |
| 2025 | MenaRD (5/5) | Big Bird (2/2) | | |
| Year | EVO Japan | Red Bull Kumite | EVO | Capcom Cup |

== Champions by character ==
| Year | EVO Japan | Red Bull Kumite | EVO | Capcom Cup |
|---|---|---|---|---|
| 2009 | ↓ Street Fighter IV ↓ | | | |
| 2009 | tournament not created | tournament not created | Ryu (1/3) | tournament not created |
| 2010 | tournament not created | tournament not created | Ryu (2/3) | tournament not created |
| 2011 | tournament not created | tournament not created | Fei Long (1/1) | tournament not created |
| 2012 | tournament not created | tournament not created | Akuma (1/3); Gouken (1/1) | tournament not created |
| 2013 | tournament not created | tournament not created | Gen (1/1) | Evil Ryu (1/2) |
| 2014 | tournament not created | tournament not created | Rose (1/1) | Ken (1/3) |
| 2015 | tournament not created | Sagat (1/2); Ryu (3/3) | Ken (2/3); Evil Ryu (2/2) Elena (1/1) | Yun (1/1) |
| 2016 | ↓ Street Fighter V ↓ | | | |
| 2016 | tournament not created | Nash (1/2) | Nash (2/2) | R. Mika (1/1); Guile (1/1) |
| 2017 | tournament not created | Urien (1/1) | Akuma (2/3) | Birdie (1/2) |
| 2018 | Menat (1/1); Juri (1/2) | Ibuki (1/2) | M. Bison (1/3); Abigail (1/1) | Rashid (1/3) |
| 2019 | Kolin (1/2); Zeku (1/1) | Ibuki (2/2) | Karin (1/1); Sagat (2/2) | Laura (1/1); Poison (1/1) |
| 2020 | Sakura (1/1) | cancelled (COVID-19 pandemic) | cancelled (COVID-19 pandemic) | cancelled (COVID-19 pandemic) |
| 2021 | cancelled (COVID-19 pandemic) | Dhalsim (1/1) | cancelled (COVID-19 pandemic) | cancelled (COVID-19 pandemic) |
| 2022 | cancelled (COVID-19 pandemic) | M. Bison (2/3); Alex (1/1); E. Honda (1/1) | Kolin (2/2) | Luke (1/3); Birdie (2/2) |
| 2023 | Seth (1/1); Rashid (2/3) | ↓ Street Fighter 6 ↓ | | |
| 2023 | ↓ Street Fighter 6 ↓ | Marisa (1/1) | Ken (3/3) | Juri (2/2) |
| 2024 | Blanka (2/3); Luke (3/3) | Blanka (1/3); Luke (2/3) | Cammy (1/1); Akuma (3/3) | JP (1/1) |
| 2025 | Blanka (3/3); Zangief (1/1); M. Bison (3/3) | Rashid (3/3) | | |
| Year | EVO Japan | Red Bull Kumite | EVO | Capcom Cup |

Note: A player can play multiple characters throughout their tournament run, every played-characters contributed to the players' win-loss records no matter if they played him/her in the finals or not, thus every characters the eventual champion used was also counted as a champion.

== Multiple slam winners by player ==
| Titles | Player | EVO Japan | Red Bull Kumite | EVO | Capcom Cup |
|---|---|---|---|---|---|
| 5 | MenaRD | 2 | 1 | 0 | 2 |
| 4 | Infiltration | 1 | 1 | 2 | 0 |
| 3 | Momochi | 1 | 0 | 1 | 1 |
| 2 | Daigo Umehara | 0 | 0 | 2 | 0 |
| 2 | Bonchan | 0 | 1 | 1 | 0 |
| 2 | Fujimura | 0 | 2 | 0 | 0 |
| 2 | Problem-X | 0 | 1 | 1 | 0 |
| 2 | Big Bird | 0 | 2 | 0 | 0 |

== Multiple slam winners by character ==
| Titles | Player | EVO Japan | Red Bull Kumite | EVO | Capcom Cup |
|---|---|---|---|---|---|
| 3 | Ryu | 0 | 1 | 2 | 0 |
| 3 | Ken | 0 | 0 | 2 | 1 |
| 3 | Luke | 1 | 1 | 0 | 1 |
| 3 | Akuma | 0 | 0 | 3 | 0 |
| 3 | Rashid | 1 | 1 | 0 | 1 |
| 3 | Blanka | 2 | 1 | 0 | 0 |
| 3 | M. Bison | 1 | 1 | 1 | 0 |
| 2 | Evil Ryu | 0 | 0 | 1 | 1 |
| 2 | Nash | 0 | 1 | 1 | 0 |
| 2 | Sagat | 0 | 1 | 1 | 0 |
| 2 | Ibuki | 0 | 2 | 0 | 0 |
| 2 | Kolin | 1 | 0 | 1 | 0 |
| 2 | Birdie | 0 | 0 | 0 | 2 |
| 2 | Juri | 1 | 0 | 0 | 1 |

== Consecutive titles ==
| EVOJP EVO Japan | EVO EVO |
| RBK Red Bull Kumite | CCC Capcom Cup |

=== Overall record ===
| Titles | Player | Character | First Event | Last Event |
|---|---|---|---|---|
| 2 | Daigo Umehara (Note: During Daigo's consecutive titles, there was only one Grand Slam tournament created.) | Ryu | 2009 EVO | 2010 EVO |
| 2 | Infiltration | Nash | 2016 RBK | 2016 EVO |
| 2 | MenaRD | Blanka; Luke | 2024 RBK | 2024 EVOJP |

=== At one tournament ===
| Titles | Player | Character | Tourn. | Years |
|---|---|---|---|---|
| 2 | Daigo Umehara | Ryu | EVO | 2009-10 |
| 2 | Fujimura | Ibuki | RBK | 2018-19 |
| 2 | MenaRD | Blanka | EVOJP | 2024-25 |
