= Street Fighter 2010: The Final Fight =

1990 video game

- North American box art
- Developer: Capcom
- Publisher: Capcom
- Producer: Tokuro Fujiwara
- Designer: Hisashi Yamamoto
- Programmers: Nobuyuki Matsushima; Koji Yoshida
- Composer: Junko Tamiya
- Series: Street Fighter
- Platform: Nintendo Entertainment System
- Release: JP: August 8, 1990; NA: September 1990
- Genres: Action, platform
- Mode: Single-player

Street Fighter 2010: The Final Fight (Note: Japanese: 2010(ニイ マル イチ マル) ストリートファイター, Hepburn: Nī Maru Ichi Maru: Sutorīto Faitā) is a 1990 action-platform video game developed and published by Capcom for the Nintendo Entertainment System. It was marketed as a science fiction-themed spin-off of the 1987 arcade game Street Fighter. Its English localization changed the name and backstory of the main character to imply that he is Ken from Street Fighter, whereas the protagonist in the original Japanese version is an unrelated character named Kevin. Street Fighter 2010 is a different genre from the traditional Street Fighter games, which are one-on-one fighting games.

== Gameplay ==
Screenshot of the game

The player controls Ken, a former martial arts champion who has been given cybernetic implants. The objective of each stage is to destroy the designated enemy target shown before the stage begins and obtain the energy required to open a transdimensional portal to the next stage. Some stages require the player to destroy more than one enemy to accumulate the energy needed to open the portal. After the portal is open, Ken only has a limited amount of time to enter it; failure to do so will cause the player to lose a life, forcing them to restart the level.

Like most side-scrolling action games, the player uses one button to attack and the other to jump. Ken can also climb walls and poles or pole-like structures, as well as hang onto and climb (or drop down from) certain kinds of ledges. In addition to his regular jump, Ken can do a backward flip jump by doing a neutral upward jump and then pressing the directional pad on the opposite direction he's facing. Ken's main weapon is an energy projectile which he launches with his fists. He can shoot straight at either direction horizontally, and upward vertically by holding the d-pad upwards, and launch curved power shots by holding the d-pad left or right and pressing the B button, which have further reach and are more powerful than the regular shots. Ken can also launch his projectiles with his kicks by holding the d-pad downward and pressing B, which will travel upward diagonally. To shoot downwards, Ken must do a flip jump first and then B while still in mid-air.

Ken's projectiles have a short range at the start of the game, but the player can uncover and pick up power-up capsules by destroying item containers scattered throughout each stage. Picking two power-up capsules increase Ken's shooting level by one, increasing the range of his projectiles and their strength; however, if Ken sustains damage, his power level will decrease by one and if he loses a life, he will revert to his starting power. Ken can increase his power by up to five levels. Other power-ups includes a back-up option for added firepower and a "flip shield capsule" that allow the player to damage enemies during flip jumps.

== Plot ==
In 2010, technology has advanced to the point that any person can easily travel from one planet to another through the use of interplanetary warp gates. Ken has retired from his fighting career after winning the Street Fighter circuit 25 years before; he has since become a gifted scientist, developing a new substance called "Cyboplasm" that grants superhuman strength to any living organism that it is administered to. When Ken's lab partner Troy is murdered, left in a pile of gelatinous material, and the Cyboplasm is stolen, Ken decides to bring Troy's killer to justice. He implants his body with bionics, and an interdimensional transporter, in order to follow the killer's trail, who has left traces of Cyboplasm in each of the planets of the "Frontier" which the killer has visited.

While on the trail of Troy's killer, a mysterious entity begins to taunt Ken, warning Ken to cease his chase. As he gets closer to the killer, Ken begins to feel a strange pain in his body. The culprit is revealed to be Troy himself, who faked his death in order to steal the Cyboplasm, spread it across the galaxy and create an army of superhuman warriors loyal to him. Troy also reveals that the pain in Ken's body is actually being caused by a dose of Cyboplasm which he implanted into Ken while he was unconscious. After defeating Troy, Ken returns to Earth to contain the spread of Cyboplasm.

== Localization ==
The English localization (Note: Despite the Japanese version being released first, the English version had started development first. While this could indicate that the Japanese version was the localization of the English version, the English version will still be referred to as the English localization to avoid confusion.) of Street Fighter 2010 differs from the original Japanese release. The localization changed the main character's identity and backstory in order to imply that he is the same Ken from the original Street Fighter, having retired from his martial arts career after winning the tournament. In the Japanese version, the main character is named Kevin Straker (ケビン・ストレイカー, Kebin Sutoreikā), (Note: Sutoreikā (ストレイカー) is the Japanese rendering of the surname Straker. However, the English language version of an official Capcom website renders the character's last name as Striker, which is traditionally rendered Sutoraikā (ストライカー) in Japanese.) a cyborg policeman employed by the Galaxy Police to neutralize a breed of interplanetary super-criminals known as "Parasites", whose abilities are drastically improved over regular humans and aliens due to an armored parasitic insect that has been implanted into their bodies. The character of Troy was originally called Dr. Jose (Dr.ホセ, Dokutā Hose), the scientist responsible for creating the parasitic organisms used to turn people into "Parasites". Before the final battle, Dr. Jose reveals that Kevin is actually a "Parasite" created by him, having implanted one of his insects into Kevin's head before having him infiltrate the Galaxy Police, and that the cybernetic armor on Kevin's body was actually created by the parasite implanted within him. Other than the changes to the main character's identity and the story, the game itself is otherwise identical between the two versions.

There is a common misconception that the game was only given the Street Fighter title for the US release, with the Japanese release having no references to the franchise. However, this is false, as the Japanese title roughly translates to 2010 Street Fighter, and the character of Kevin has been referenced in official Japanese Street Fighter tie-in material.

== Reception ==
Reception

Review score
Publication	Score
Famitsu	5/10, 7/10, 7/10, 6/10

GameSpot retrospectively criticized the translated plotline of introducing Ken as a cyborg 25 years in the future of the original Street Fighter, comparing it to the alterations to Dhalsim for the movie Street Fighter. 1UP.com retrospectively described the game as a "bastard offshoot" of the franchise and a "nightmare of terrible localization". ScrewAttack retrospectively stated that the game was incredibly difficult but not bad, and that if it had not been marketed as a Street Fighter game, it most likely would have been ignored.
