= Super Street Fighter IV =

2010 video game

- North American cover art
- Developers: Dimps; Capcom
- Publisher: Capcom
- Director: Taisaku Okada
- Producer: Yoshinori Ono
- Designers: Hirotoshi Shiozaki; Atsushi Tamamura; Mitsuo Matsuyama
- Artist: Daigo Ikeno
- Composer: Hideyuki Fukasawa
- Series: Street Fighter
- Platforms: PlayStation 3, Xbox 360, Nintendo 3DS
- Release: NA: April 27, 2010; JP: April 28, 2010; EU: April 30, 2010; 3D Edition: JP: February 26, 2011; EU: March 25, 2011; NA: March 27, 2011; AU: March 31, 2011
- Genre: Fighting
- Modes: Single-player, multiplayer
- Arcade system: Taito Type X^{2}

Super Street Fighter IV (Note: Japanese: スーパーストリートファイター IV, Hepburn: Sūpā Sutorīto Faitā Fō) is a 2010 fighting game developed and published by Capcom. It is an updated version of Street Fighter IV and has been said to mark the definitive end of the Street Fighter IV series. Having been deemed too large an update to be deployed as DLC, the game was made into a standalone title but given a lower price than that of a full retail game. It was released in April 2010 for the PlayStation 3 and Xbox 360. A port to the Nintendo 3DS with stereoscopic 3D functionality, Super Street Fighter IV: 3D Edition was released as one of the launch titles for the console in 2011. The game sold 1.9 million units worldwide, while the 3D Edition for the 3DS sold an additional 1.1 million units worldwide.

== Gameplay ==
One of Super Street Fighter IV's additional characters, Makoto, performing her Fukiage on Dan Hibiki

Much like Street Fighter IV, Super Street Fighter IV plays like a traditional fighting game, utilizing 3D backgrounds and 3D characters on a 2D plane. The goal is to exhaust the opponent's health meter before the time runs out. The player wins a round if they deplete their opponent's health meter, or have more health than their opponent when time runs out. If both players deplete their meters at the same time or contain the same amount when the round timer ends, it will result in either a "Double KO" or a draw giving both players a round win. If there isn't a clear winner by the final match, it will result in a "draw game" (during online play, both players will lose battle points, and player points, in the result of a draw game).

Gameplay screenshot of Dudley fighting Balrog in the "Cruise Ship Stern" stage in the Nintendo 3DS version. The touch screen features icons that can be used for certain moves; this was done in order to help lapsed players get back into the series.

Players use the analog stick or directional pad to control their fighters, which allows players to jump, crouch, and move toward and away from opponents with an eight-way directional system. Generally, there are six attack buttons for both punch and kick commands with three of each type, differing in strength and speed. Similar to the latter two games from the Street Fighter III series, grabs are performed by pressing both light attacks, while taunts are performed by pressing both heavy attacks simultaneously. The touchscreen on the Nintendo 3DS can also be used to utilize various "personal actions", which displays multiple icons for each action, though its nature depends on whether players have the difficult mode set on "Lite" or "Pro"; on Pro mode, such moves have to be performed manually. The Ultra Combo gauge and moves has been left unchanged since Street Fighter IV. All characters feature at least two Ultra Combos. However, only one Ultra can be selected at a time in a way similar to the Super Arts system in the Street Fighter III series. To use a Super Combo or an Ultra Combo, the respective meters have to be full. The Ultra combo meter charges up when the player gets hit and so it can also be called a Revenge Meter. The Ultra Combo meter is the one right next to the Super Combo meter. Players may filter online play opponents; this depends on whether they are playing in Lite or Pro modes. It features abilities such as "Focus Attacks" and separate meters for both "Super" and "Ultra" combos. When in the single-player mode, if toggled on, there are additional bonus stages which allows a chance to receive additional points, similar to the ones found in Street Fighter II. The first challenge challenges players to break a car while the second has players break as many barrels as they can.

It has two primary modes: single-player and multi-player, the latter mode which supports both online and local play. Other modes include Team Battle, which supports up to eight players; Replay Channel, which allows players to view and share replays with others online; and rival battles, which features a dialogue sequence between two characters which depends on who they are; Tournament, a replacement of Street Fighter IV's "Championship Mode" which allows players compete in a small single elimination bracket; Endless Battle, which has the winner playing against a rotating group of up to 8 players; as well as Replay Channel, allows players to view and save replays from various matches around the world.

3D Edition introduces a number of new features. One of the more prominent features is the use of stereoscopic 3D, as well as the support of the Nintendo Network, for which it uses the Nintendo 3DS's universal Friend Code to play online. As stated above, it utilizes the touchscreen to allow players to perform special abilities more easily, as well as the difficulty modes Lite and Pro. 3D Edition makes use of the 3DS's StreetPass function, which allows players to swap in-game figurines of characters that are unlocked throughout the game as well as use them in battle whenever the 3DS is in range of another player's 3DS who also has the game. The figurines have statistics, and players can make their own team of figurines for the aforementioned figurine battles. Players are also able to share the game with others, who can play it without a copy of the game; however, players are only allowed to use Ryu in a single specific stage (Training Stage). Players are also able to switch the view from the traditional 2D plane to an over-the-shoulder view, called Dynamic Mode, which presents the stereoscopic 3D better.

== Characters ==
"Super Street Fighter IV" includes all the original 25 World Warriors from the home version of "Street Fighter IV", as well as 10 new fighters, all of which are unlocked at the start of the game; this means that there a total of 35 characters in "Super Street Fighter IV". Each returning character received a new intro and ending in arcade mode.

Among the added World Warriors are Dee Jay and T. Hawk from Super Street Fighter II, who were initially intended for the original Street Fighter IV but later dropped. Adon from the original Street Fighter and Cody and Guy from Final Fight are available, based on their incarnations in the Street Fighter Alpha series. Additionally, Dudley, Ibuki, and Makoto return from the Street Fighter III series.

The game also introduced two all-new fighters. One of them is Juri, a young South Korean female Taekwondo fighter, who works for Seth's organization, the Shadaloo Intimidation Network (S.I.N.). Juri has an energy-boosting device implanted inside her left eye called the "Feng Shui Engine", which provides her with time-warping abilities. The second fighter, Hakan, is a Turkish oil wrestler who seeks to prove that Turkish oil wrestling is the greatest fighting style on Earth.

Each returning character from the original version of Street Fighter IV features an additional third costume, whereas newly introduced characters have only 2 available. Old costumes from the original Street Fighter IV can be used after purchasing downloadable costume packs from Xbox Live or PlayStation Network. These costumes are automatically loaded in Super Street Fighter IV.

== Development ==
Capcom officially hinted at the game in early September 2009 when they opened a teaser site in their official Japanese website. An official announcement was made on September 28, 2009, for the Xbox 360 and PlayStation 3, with an arcade version initially only considered a possibility depending on fan support.

In 2010 Yoshinori Ono said:

"I have no intention of carrying on Street Fighter IV into Hyper Street Fighter IV or Ultra Street Fighter IV, because I'm aware of the mistakes Capcom has made in the past. So whether it would be a different IP or another Street Fighter, we'd like to keep options open. But in terms of Street Fighter IV, this is definitive... Super Street Fighter IV should be the distinctive end. Obviously there can be updates via DLC so perhaps in 2011, we could upload a patch for Super Street Fighter IV 2011 edition that would have tuning and balancing. But as a packaged product, I think this is the last."

Before 3D Edition began development, a port of Super Street Fighter IV was considered for either the Nintendo DS or PlayStation Portable; however, Ono felt that neither handheld would provide satisfaction for him. He was first introduced to the 3DS by Capcom producer Jun Takeuchi, who showed him a version of Resident Evil 5 playing on the 3DS. Afterward, he "threw together a quick build" of Super Street Fighter IV in a couple weeks for the 3DS. Nintendo, after being shown the build, was impressed by it, and wanted it to be shown at E3 2010. However, Ono felt that the build was not ready to be shown; instead, he allowed Nintendo to show a couple of screenshots and talk about the game. Ono included the Dynamic Mode early on in development in part to make it appealing to casual gamers. He noted another advantage of this angle was how well it worked with Ken and Ryu, who he finds to be most commonly used by "lapsed players" who used to play the series. In an interview between Nintendo president Satoru Iwata and Yoshinori Ono, the two of them discussed the touchscreen control, with the latter comparing it to New Super Mario Bros. Wii's Super Guide function. Ono added that they were intent on making a game that could make it more approachable. He added that while some may call him a "sell-out", he felt that it was advantageous to the developer as well as the gamers. When Ono learned of the pedometer function of the 3DS that rewarded coins for the number of steps taken, he decided to implement it to allow coins to be spent on figurines. He also designed the Fighter Request function, which when activated allows anyone playing the game nearby to accept this request, with the hopes of creating another community.

He noted that the only misgiving he had was with the expressions of characters as they perform or get hit by ultra moves which were accomplished by a different method than the console version; however, he felt that no one would notice this on a small screen. This fact allowed them to make more simplified modes to make the game move faster. The developers also had to tweak the backgrounds as they work on the 3D effects due to them sometimes overlapping with itself. When asked why characters exclusive to the arcade game Super Street Fighter IV Arcade Edition were not featured in the game, Ono explained that it was due to timing and a desire to focus on the already proven console version. He did note however that features from the Arcade Edition could be included if there appears to be interest. He elaborated that even if he could add these features, they may not due to the more hardcore nature of the Arcade Edition, and that if there is no hardcore audience for 3D Edition, they don't want to "force them into some new version." In an attempt to simulate the "Saturn-style" six button configuration, the Pro mode was designed to have these six buttons on the touch screen; however, the developers found it to not be comfortable.

== Versions ==
=== Arcade version ===
On April 4, 2010, an arcade version of Super Street Fighter IV was confirmed by producer Yoshinori Ono during the Japanese Street Fighter IV finals. Various playtests were handled in various arcades as well as appearing during the Street Fighter IV finals at Tougeki - Super Battle Opera.

For the arcade version of the game, every character received various tweaks, ranging from character balancing to new EX moves.

The arcade version of SSFIV added twin brothers Yun and Yang from the Street Fighter III series as playable characters, and introduced Evil Ryu and Oni as hidden bosses. During the launch of the arcade version, a launch trailer was uploaded teasing secret characters Evil Ryu and Oni. Various arcades around the United States who obtained Arcade Edition units also were since able to gain access to the initially non-selectable, then unannounced characters planned for a later release. Videos featuring Evil Ryu and Oni were requested to be closed as well as accounts suspended at the request of Capcom. Evil Ryu became officially playable on March 25, 2011, while Oni was released on April 8, 2011.

As with the previous version, the arcade version of Super Street Fighter IV Arcade Edition utilizes an NESYS Card system which allows players to keep and track their BP and PP statistics. The pre-match screen will now show a national rank and a prefectural rank as well as an introduction message up to 30 characters long.

The arcade version of the game would be later ported to home platforms in the form of Super Street Fighter IV: Arcade Edition, offered as both a retail game, and as an update to Super Street Fighter IV.

== Updates ==
=== Downloadable content ===
In Asia, a voucher for a downloadable Super Street Fighter IV OVA featuring Juri was supplied in the Collector's Edition of the Xbox 360 version. The 40-minute feature serves as an origin story to Juri and a canonical precursor to the game. Although having been fully dubbed in English, the movie was not released outside of Asia until its inclusion as part of the Street Fighter 25th Anniversary Collector's Set in 2012.

Owners of the original Street Fighter IV costume DLC packs are able to access their previously purchased DLC packs in the new game, as well as having two extra colors unlocked which are only available upon detecting a save from that game. A downloadable Tournament Mode was released on June 15, 2010. As with its previous incarnation, Super Street Fighter IV offers optional alternate costumes for each of the characters through paid DLC. Sold in packs, the first bundle was made available on April 27, 2010. Between October 27, 2010, and early 2011, players can purchase another set of optional alternate costumes through paid DLC packs. The downloadable content are included by default in the Nintendo 3DS release.

=== Arcade Edition ===
Released in July 2012, Super Street Fighter IV: Arcade Edition is an update that brings the changes in the arcade version of Super Street Fighter IV to the home systems.

The update, available as downloadable content in the console versions, and a retail game for Xbox 360, PlayStation 3 and Microsoft Windows, includes several balance changes, as well adding Yun, Yang, Oni and Evil Ryu as playable characters.

=== Ultra Street Fighter IV ===
A new update for Street Fighter IV titled Ultra Street Fighter IV was announced in July 2013. The new edition was released on June 4, 2014, as an arcade machine, a DLC add-on for existing console versions of Super Street Fighter IV, and as a stand-alone game containing DLC from previous iterations. Along with various gameplay tweaks and additional modes, the update adds six additional stages and five additional characters: Rolento, Elena, Poison and Hugo (all ported from their Street Fighter x Tekken appearances), as well as Decapre (one of M. Bison's "Dolls" that debuted as a non-player character in Street Fighter Alpha 3).

== Reception ==
Reception

Aggregate score
Aggregator	Score
Metacritic	PS3: 92/100; X360: 91/100; 3DS: 85/100

Review scores
Publication	Score
1Up.com	A
Computer and Video Games	9.5/10; 3DS: 9.0/10
Edge	10/10
Eurogamer	10/10
Famitsu	35/40
Game Informer	9/10
GamePro	4.5/5
GameSpot	9.0/10
GameTrailers	9.3/10
Giant Bomb	5/5
IGN	9.0/10
Nintendo Life	9/10
Play	90%
VideoGamer.com	9/10
X-Play	5/5
GamingUnion.net	9.0/10

Award
Publication	Award
Academy of Interactive Arts & Sciences	Fighting Game of the Year (2011)

IGN gave the Super Street Fighter IV a 9.0 and an Editor's Choice award, calling it "a superior version of one of the best fighting games around... with a far more developed online mode compared to the original version". GameTrailers gave the game 9.3, praising it for its improvements over the original. Giant Bomb's Jeff Gerstmann awarded the game a score of 5 out of 5, saying, "Super Street Fighter IV adds enough great new content to justify skipping over the 'Champion Edition' and 'Hyper Fighting' steps in the Street Fighter upgrade path." GameSpot gave the game a 9.0, commenting that "Super Street Fighter IV stands tall on the broad shoulders of its predecessor. Its large and diverse character roster, balance tweaks, and comprehensive online play reaffirm its place as one of the best fighters this generation, and it's a worthy upgrade even if you own last year's version" In 2011, Complex ranked it as the 40th best fighting game of all time. In 2019, Game Informer ranked it as the 10th best fighting game of all time.

Computer and Video Games gave the 3DS Edition a score of 9.0, praising its appeal to both hardcore and casual gamers, as well as having as much content as its console counterpart. Kotaku also praised the port, saying "if you are going to buy one 3DS game, get this."

In their October 2013 issue, Edge retroactively awarded the game a coveted ten out of ten, one of only twenty-three games to achieve that perfect score in the magazine's twenty-year history.

During the 14th Annual Interactive Achievement Awards, the Academy of Interactive Arts & Sciences awarded Super Street Fighter IV with "Fighting Game of the Year".

The 3DS release also received positive reception. Computer and Video Games' Tamoor Hussain called the console version "this generation's greatest fighter" and praised the 3D effects, the amount of content retained from the console version, and its increased appeal to both casual and hardcore gamers. Fellow CVG editor Andy Robinson recommended it as one of the better launch games. Famitsu's editors found it to be well received, giving praise to the graphics and touchscreen control though noting that the Dynamic Mode can be a "bit hard to see." Eurogamer's Johnny Minkley noted that while it was not a "serious alternative for high-level players", it gets as close to it as it can. He also gave praise to its figurines and the Dynamic Mode. Kotaku's Brian Ashcraft named it the one game to buy around the 3DS's launch, and praised it as demonstrative of what the 3DS can do. He was surprised by the quality of the online play; while he expected it to be as bad as Super Smash Bros. Brawl's, he found it "lag-free, smooth and painless." He also gives praise to the StreetPass function and touchscreen control, though he notes that he has not actually been able to use StreetPass yet. Stuff's James Burnett found it to be a strong launch title due to its "fun, fast and tight" gameplay, sound design, and the online multiplayer.

GameSpot's Ricardo Torres and Shaun McInnis featured it in their analysis of the Japanese 3DS launch. They wrote that it is "one of the highest profile titles available" for the 3DS and made a good transition from consoles. They also called the touchscreen controls reliable and not disruptive. NGamer UK noted that while it was a "staggering port of an exceptional fighting game", it was not the "definitive version of the game". Game Informer called it a "complete game" and that Super Street Fighter IV is "one of the best fighting games around". Pocket Gamer's Damien McFerran noted that while the "one-on-one 2D fighter" was not the ideal game to demonstrate stereoscopic visuals, 3D Edition proved to be the most appealing game at the 3DS's launch. He noted that despite some "minor interface issues", it is also "one of the finest portable punch-ups we’ve experienced in years". The Telegraph's Tom Hoggins wrote that while not the definitive version of Super Street Fighter IV and was "yet another update of a two year old game", it was "built with such skill and pride it's hard not to fall for it all over again." In a comparison of its video game Dead or Alive: Dimensions to 3D Edition, Team Ninja's Yosuke Hayashi stated that Dimensions, due to its 3D gameplay, conveyed the 3D effects better than 3D Edition's 2D visuals do. In spite of the positive reception, games(TM) found that even though it was "arguably the best portable version" of a Street Fighter game, this was due to the poor quality of previous games of its kind rather than the high quality of it. GamePro's Julian Rignall meanwhile found it to be "everything you could want from a mobile Super Street Fighter IV.
