= Street Fighter =

Japanese media franchise

- Genre: Fighting game
- Developers: Capcom (main series and spin-offs; 1987–present); Dimps (main series; 2008–2016); Arika (Street Fighter EX series)
- Publisher: Capcom
- Creators: Takashi Nishiyama; Hiroshi Matsumoto
- Platforms: List: 3DO; Amiga; CD32; Amstrad CPC; Android; Arcade; Atari ST; BlackBerry; Commodore 64; CPS Changer; Dreamcast; Fujitsu FM Towns; Game Boy; Game Boy Advance; Game Boy Color; iOS; Java ME; Master System; Windows; Mobile phone; MS-DOS; NES; Nintendo 3DS; Nintendo Switch; Nintendo Switch 2; PC Engine; PlayStation; PlayStation 2; PlayStation 3; PlayStation 4; PlayStation 5; PlayStation Portable; PlayStation Vita; PocketStation; Genesis; Saturn; X68000; Steam; Super NES; TurboGrafx-16; Wii Virtual Console; Wii U Virtual Console; Xbox; Xbox 360; Xbox Live Arcade; Xbox One; Xbox Series X/S; ZX Spectrum
- First release: Street Fighter; August 30, 1987; 39 years ago
- Latest release: Street Fighter 6 June 2, 2023

Street Fighter (Note: Japanese: ストリートファイター, Hepburn: Sutorīto Faitā) is a Japanese media franchise centered on a series of fighting games developed and published by Capcom. The first game in the series was released in 1987, followed by the other five main games in the series, various spin-offs and crossovers, and numerous appearances in other media. Its best-selling 1991 release, Street Fighter II, established many of the conventions of the one-on-one fighting genre.

Street Fighter is one of the highest-grossing video game franchises of all time and one of Capcom's flagship series, with total sales of 60 million units worldwide as of July 2026. It is also one of the highest-grossing media franchises and is the longest-running fighting game franchise.

== Games ==
Release timeline Main series in bold
1987	**Street Fighter**
1988
1989
1990	Street Fighter 2010: The Final Fight
1991	**Street Fighter II**
1992	Street Fighter II: Champion Edition
1992	Street Fighter II Turbo
1993	Super Street Fighter II
1994	Super Street Fighter II Turbo
1995	**Street Fighter Alpha**
1995	Street Fighter: The Movie (Arcade)
1995	Street Fighter: The Movie (Console)
1996	Street Fighter Alpha 2
1996	X-Men vs. Street Fighter
1996	Street Fighter EX
1997	**Street Fighter III**
1997	Marvel Super Heroes vs. Street Fighter
1997	Street Fighter Collection
1997	Street Fighter III: 2nd Impact
1997	Pocket Fighter (Super Gem Fighter Mini Mix)
1998	Street Fighter EX2
1998	Street Fighter Alpha 3
1999	Street Fighter III: 3rd Strike
2000	Street Fighter EX3
2001
2002
2003	Hyper Street Fighter II
2004	Street Fighter Anniversary Collection
2004	Capcom Fighting Evolution
2005
2006	Street Fighter Alpha Anthology
2007
2008	**Street Fighter IV**
2008	Super Street Fighter II Turbo HD Remix
2009
2010	Super Street Fighter IV
2010	Super Street Fighter IV: Arcade Edition
2011	Super Street Fighter IV: 3D Edition
2012	Street Fighter X Tekken
2012	Street Fighter X Mega Man
2013
2014	Ultra Street Fighter IV
2015
2016	**Street Fighter V**
2017	Ultra Street Fighter II
2018	Street Fighter V: Arcade Edition
2018	Street Fighter 30th Anniversary Collection
2019
2020	Street Fighter V: Champion Edition
2021
2022	Capcom Fighting Collection
2023	**Street Fighter 6**
2024	Marvel vs. Capcom Fighting Collection: Arcade Classics
2025	Capcom Fighting Collection 2

=== Street Fighter (1987) ===
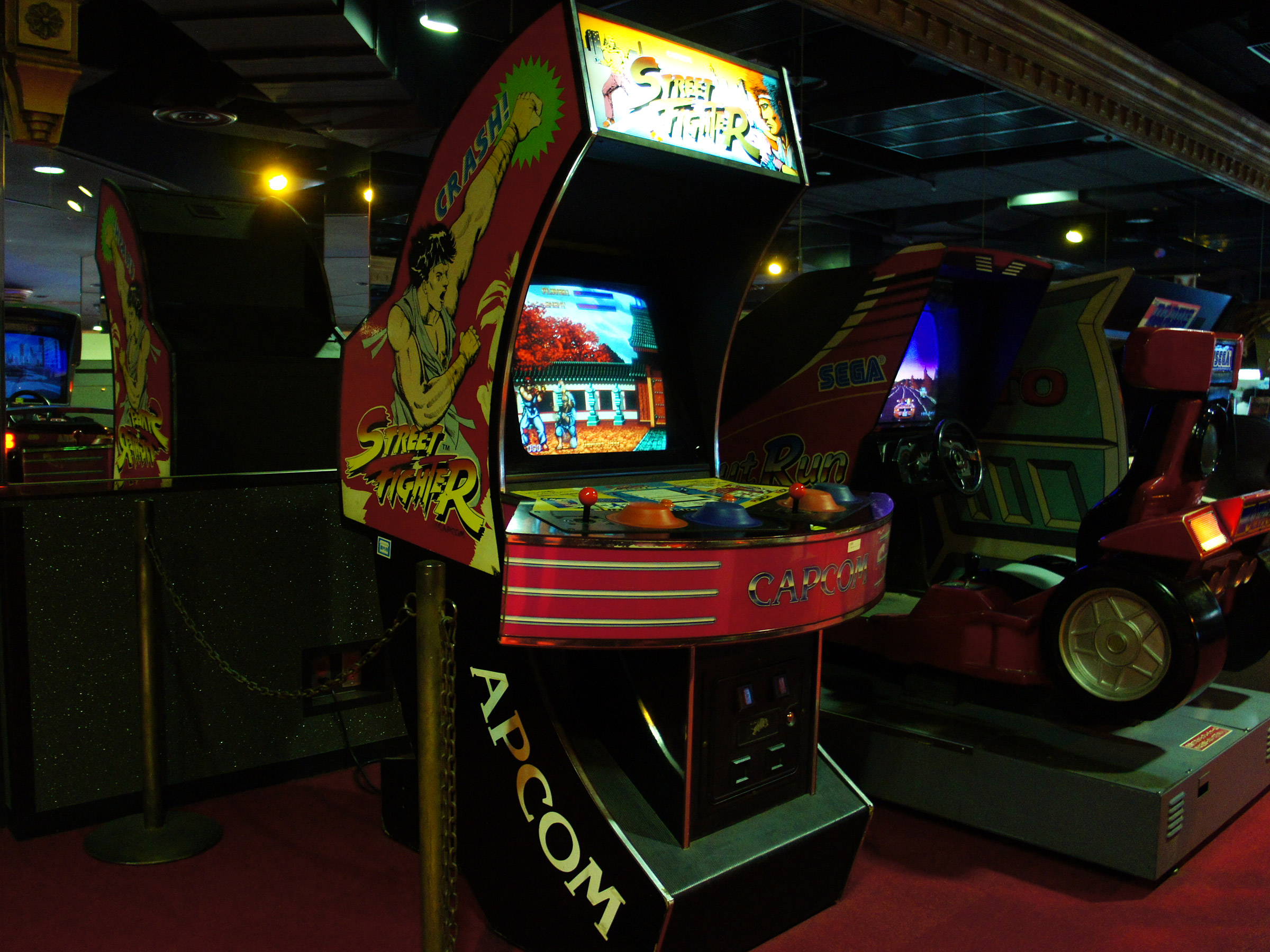
A Street Fighter arcade cabinet

Street Fighter, designed by Takashi Nishiyama and Hiroshi Matsumoto, was released as an arcade video game in 1987. The player controls martial artist Ryu to compete in a worldwide martial arts tournament spanning five countries and 10 opponents. A second player can control Ryu's friendly American rival, Ken Masters. The player can perform three punch and kick attacks, each varying in speed and strength, and three special attacks: the Hadōken, Shōryūken, and Tatsumaki Senpūkyaku, performed by executing special joystick and button combinations.

Street Fighter was converted to many home computers, including MS-DOS. In 1987, it was released on the TurboGrafx-16 CD add-on console as Fighting Street by Hudson Soft. In 2005, Street Fighter was included in Capcom Classics Collection: Remixed for the PlayStation Portable and Capcom Classics Collection Vol. 2 for the PlayStation 2 and Xbox. It is also available in the 2018 compilation, Street Fighter 30th Anniversary Collection for the PlayStation 4, Xbox One, Nintendo Switch and Windows.

=== Street Fighter II (1991) ===
Street Fighter II was released in 1991 following an unsuccessful attempt to brand the 1989 beat 'em up game Final Fight as the Street Fighter sequel. It is one of the earliest arcade games for Capcom's CP System hardware and was designed by Akira Nishitani and Akira Yasuda, who also made Final Fight and Forgotten Worlds.

Street Fighter II: The World Warrior is the first one-on-one fighting game to give players a choice from a variety of player characters with different moves, allowing for more varied matches. Each player character has a unique fighting style with approximately 30 or more moves, including new grappling moves and throws, and two or three special attacks. In the single-player mode, the player character is pitted sequentially against the seven other main characters before confronting the final four bosses, exclusively CPU-controlled. As in the original, a second player can join anytime for competitive matches.

The original Japanese version of Street Fighter II introduced an African-American boxer boss character that shared the physical characteristics and likeness of real-life boxer Mike Tyson. (The character was originally named "Mike Bison". To avoid a likeness infringement lawsuit, Capcom rotated the names of three of the boss characters for international versions of the game. The final boss, named Vega in the Japanese version, was given the M. Bison name, the talon-wielding Spanish warrior, named Balrog in the Japanese version, was renamed Vega and the boxer became Balrog. In a 2019 interview, Mike Tyson himself was asked about the "Mike Bison" character design, and revealed that he was "honored by the impersonation".)

Street Fighter II eclipsed its predecessor in popularity, eventually turning Street Fighter into a multimedia franchise. It had an unexpectedly phenomenal impact on gaming. More than $10 billion in inflation-adjusted revenue as of 2017 was grossed from all versions, mostly from arcades. More than 14 million cartridges were sold for the Super Nintendo Entertainment System and Sega Genesis/Mega Drive.

The first official update to the series was Street Fighter II: Champion Edition, pronounced Street Fighter II Dash in Japan, as noted by the prime notation on the logo. The four computer-controlled boss characters are human-playable and two players can choose the same character, leaving one character with an alternate color pattern. It has slightly improved graphics, including differently colored backgrounds and refined gameplay. A second upgrade, Street Fighter II: Hyper Fighting (Street Fighter II Dash Turbo in Japan), was produced in response to the various bootleg editions of the game. Hyper Fighting offers faster gameplay than its predecessors, different character costume colors and new special techniques. Super Street Fighter II: The New Challengers, the third revision, gives the game a complete graphical and musical overhaul and introduces four new playable characters. It is also the first game for Capcom's CP System II arcade hardware. The fifth arcade installment, Super Street Fighter II Turbo, Super Street Fighter II X in Japan, brings back the faster gameplay of Hyper Fighting, a new type of special techniques known as "Super Combos" and a hidden character, Akuma.

Numerous home versions of the Street Fighter II games have been produced following the release of the original game. The original version, Street Fighter II: The World Warrior, was ported to the Super NES in 1992, which is Capcom's best-selling game as of 2008. A Japanese-only port of Street Fighter II Dash for the PC Engine came in 1993. That year, two home versions of Hyper Fighting were released: Street Fighter II Turbo for Super NES and Street Fighter II: Special Champion Edition (Street Fighter II Dash Plus in Japan) for Genesis. The following game, Super Street Fighter II, was also ported to the Super NES and Genesis in 1994. That year, Super Street Fighter II Turbo was released for the 3DO Interactive Multiplayer and for Windows, released by the now-defunct GameTek.

In 1997, Capcom released the Street Fighter Collection for the PlayStation and Sega Saturn. This is a compilation including Super and Super Turbo, and Street Fighter Alpha 2 Gold (Street Fighter Zero 2′ (Dash) in Japan), an updated version of Street Fighter Alpha 2. It was followed by Street Fighter Collection 2 (Capcom Generation Vol. 5 in Japan), also released for the PlayStation and Saturn, which includes the original Street Fighter II, Champion Edition, and Hyper Fighting. In 2000, Capcom released Super Street Fighter II X for Matching Service exclusively in Japan for the Dreamcast. This version of the game features an online two-player versus mode. In 2003, Capcom released Hyper Street Fighter II: The Anniversary Edition for the arcades in Japan and Asia to commemorate the 15th anniversary of the series. As the final arcade installment, the game is a hybrid version of Super Turbo, which allows players to select between versions of characters from all five previous Street Fighter II games. Hyper was released in North America and the PAL region via its ports for the PlayStation 2 and the Xbox, released as part of the Street Fighter Anniversary Collection along with Street Fighter III: 3rd Strike. In 2005, the three games in Street Fighter Collection 2 were included in Capcom Classics Collection Vol. 1 for PlayStation 2 and Xbox. A version of Super Turbo, along with the original Street Fighter, was later included in the 2007 compilation Capcom Classics Collection Vol. 2, also released for the PlayStation 2 and Xbox. Street Fighter II and Super Street Fighter II are also available as downloadable games for select cellular phone services.

An updated version of Super Street Fighter II Turbo came to the PlayStation Network and Xbox Live Arcade services in 2008. The game, Super Street Fighter II Turbo HD Remix, has fully redrawn artwork, including HD sprites 4.5x the original size, drawn by artists from UDON. This is the first time the Street Fighter characters have had new sprites, drawn by Capcom, since Capcom vs. SNK 2 in 2001. The game has several changes which address character balancing issues, but also features the original arcade version gameplay so that players can choose between the two.

Ultra Street Fighter II: The Final Challengers is an updated version of 1994's Super Street Fighter II Turbo for the Nintendo Switch. The game features two graphical styles—classic pixel art and updated high-definition art. New gameplay mechanics and modes have been introduced and tweaks have been made to the game's balance. It has two more characters, who are classic alternate evil form of the classic characters Ryu and Ken, Evil Ryu and Violent Ken, and Akuma is now playable.

=== Street Fighter Alpha (1995) ===
Street Fighter Alpha: Warriors' Dreams (Street Fighter Zero in Asia and Mexico), was released in 1995. It uses the same character designs Capcom previously employed in Darkstalkers and X-Men: Children of the Atom, with settings and character designs heavily influenced by Street Fighter II: The Animated Movie. Alpha expands on the Super Combo system from Super Turbo by extending Super Combo meter into three levels, allowing for super combos to be stored up and introducing Alpha Counters and Chain Combos, also from Darkstalkers. The plot of Alpha is set between the first two Street Fighter games and fleshes out the backstories and grudges held by many of the classic Street Fighter II characters. It has a playable roster of ten immediately playable characters and three unlockable fighters, comprising not only younger versions of established characters, but also characters from the original Street Fighter and Final Fight, such as Adon and Guy.

Street Fighter Alpha 2 has all-new stages, music, and endings for some characters, some of which overlap with those from the original Alpha. It also discards the Chain Combo system in favor of Custom Combos, which requires a portion of the Super Combo meter to be used. Alpha 2 retains all 13 characters from the original and adds five new characters to the roster along with hidden versions of returning characters. Alpha 2 is followed by a slightly enhanced arcade release, Street Fighter Zero 2 Alpha, released in Japan and Brazil, ported to home consoles as Street Fighter Alpha 2 Gold and Zero 2′ Dash in Japan.

The third and final Alpha game, Street Fighter Alpha 3, was released in 1998 following the release of the original Street Fighter III: 2nd Impact and Street Fighter EX. Alpha 3 introduces three selectable fighting styles and further expands the playable roster to 28 characters. Console versions of the three games, including the original Alpha 2 and Alpha 2 Gold, were released for the PlayStation and Sega Saturn, although versions of specific games in the series were also released for the Game Boy Color, Super NES, Dreamcast, and Windows. The home console versions of Alpha 3 further expands the character roster by adding the remaining "New Challengers" from Super Street Fighter II. The Dreamcast version of the game was backported to the arcades in Japan as Street Fighter Zero 3 Upper. A version of Upper, titled Alpha 3 outside Japan, was released for the Game Boy Advance and added three characters from Capcom vs. SNK 2. A PlayStation Portable version, Alpha 3 MAX, or Zero 3 Double Upper in Japan, contains the added characters from the GBA version and Ingrid from Capcom Fighting Jam.

=== Street Fighter EX (1996) ===
In 1996, Capcom co-produced a 3D fighting game Street Fighter EX with Arika, a company founded by Street Fighter II planner Akira Nishitani. It was developed for the PlayStation-based ZN-1 hardware. EX combined the established Street Fighter cast with original characters created and owned by Arika. It was followed by an upgraded version, Street Fighter EX Plus, in 1997, which expanded the character roster. A home version with additional features and characters, Street Fighter EX Plus Alpha, was released for the PlayStation during the same year.

A sequel was released in 1998, Street Fighter EX2, developed for the ZN-2 hardware. Custom combos were reintroduced and the character roster was expanded upon even further. In 1999, EX2 also received an upgraded version, Street Fighter EX2 Plus. A port of EX2 Plus was released for the arcades and the PlayStation in 1999.

The third game in the series, Street Fighter EX3, was released as a launch game for the PlayStation 2 in 2000. This game included a tag team system, a mode that let a single player fight up to three opponents simultaneously, and another mode that allowed players to give the new character, Ace, a selection of special and super moves after purchasing them with experience points. The cast included many characters from the previous game.

Some of the Arika-owned characters from the series were later featured in other games developed by the company. The Namco-distributed arcade game Fighting Layer featured Allen Snider and Blair Dame from the original EX, while Skullomania would reappear in the PlayStation game Fighter Maker. A spiritual successor to Fighting Layer, featuring an initial roster consisting entirely of Arika-owned EX characters, Fighting EX Layer, was released in 2018.

=== Crossover series (1996) ===
Capcom produced fighting games involving licensed characters from other companies and their own properties. In 1994, Capcom released the Marvel-licensed fighting game X-Men: Children of the Atom, which features Akuma from Super Street Fighter II Turbo as a hidden character. It was followed by Marvel Super Heroes in 1995, which features Anita from Night Warriors: Darkstalkers' Revenge.

Capcom released a third Marvel-licensed game, X-Men vs. Street Fighter, in 1996, a full-fledged crossover between characters from X-Men and the Street Fighter Alpha games with a two-on-two tag team-based system. It was followed by Marvel Super Heroes vs. Street Fighter in 1997, which expanded the roster to include characters from Marvel Super Heroes; Marvel vs. Capcom in 1998, which features characters from Street Fighter and other Capcom properties; and Marvel vs. Capcom 2: New Age of Heroes in 2000, which was produced from the Dreamcast-based NAOMI hardware. Due to Marvel licensing issues, Marvel vs. Capcom 2 was unavailable for digital purchase until the release of Marvel vs. Capcom Fighting Collection: Arcade Classics in 2024.

Capcom produced a series of similar crossover fighting games with rival fighting game developer SNK Playmore. They include Capcom vs. SNK: Millennium Fight 2000 in 2000, which features characters primarily from the Street Fighter and The King of Fighters series. It was followed by a minor upgrade, Capcom vs. SNK: Millennium Fight 2000 Pro, and a sequel, Capcom vs. SNK 2: Mark of the Millennium 2001, both released in 2001. All three games were produced for the NAOMI hardware as well. The SNK-produced fighting games of this crossover series include the Dimps-developed portable fighting game SNK vs. Capcom: The Match of the Millennium for the Neo Geo Pocket Color in 1999 and SNK vs. Capcom: SVC Chaos for the Neo Geo in 2003.

From 2003 to 2008, the Versus series of Capcom fighting games had no new releases, though Capcom and Namco produced the crossover tactical role-playing game Namco × Capcom for the PlayStation 2 exclusively in Japan in 2005. Ryu and Ken are playable in 2012's Project X Zone, a tactical role-playing game that draws characters from various Sega, Namco-Bandai, and Capcom franchises.

Tatsunoko vs. Capcom: Cross Generation of Heroes, released in 2008, features characters from both Tatsunoko Production and Capcom properties, including Street Fighter characters Ryu, Chun-Li, and Alex as well as characters like Ken the Eagle of Gatchaman and Casshern of Neo-Human Casshern on Tatsunoko's side. Initially released only in Japan, the game received an updated international release, Tatsunoko vs. Capcom: Ultimate All-Stars, in 2010 in response to fan demand.

Marvel vs. Capcom 3: Fate of Two Worlds was released in 2011 and includes Akuma, Chun-Li, Crimson Viper, and Ryu. The game features completely new visuals and audio, three-on-three gameplay, and online play. The game was also intended to have downloadable content, but the content was disrupted due to an earthquake and tsunami in Tōhoku and was released along with additional new content in a separate game, Ultimate Marvel vs. Capcom 3.

Street Fighter X Tekken was released in 2012, featuring over 50 playable characters from both the Street Fighter and Tekken fighting franchises. Street Fighter X Tekken was developed by Capcom, and Namco developed a crossover game, Tekken X Street Fighter. Akuma has a guest appearance in Tekken 7.

Street Fighter X Mega Man is an all-star platform game that was originally supposed to be a fan game developed by Seow Zong Hui, but Capcom distributed and released the game for the PC in 2012. Based on the classic Mega Man games, the free game has players control Mega Man as he battles against various Street Fighter characters and obtain their techniques.

Marvel vs. Capcom: Infinite was released in 2017. Infinite features two-on-two fights, as opposed to the three-on-three format used in its preceding games. The series' traditional character assists have been removed; instead, the game incorporates a tag-based combo system, which allows players to instantly switch between their two characters to form continuous combos. It introduces a new gameplay mechanic in the form of the Infinity Stones, which temporarily bestow players with unique abilities and stat boosts depending on the type of stone selected.

Beyond Street Fighter, Capcom franchises make guest appearances in the 2014 Nintendo crossover-fighting games Super Smash Bros. for Nintendo 3DS and Wii U, with protagonist Ryu appearing alongside fellow Capcom representative Mega Man. The Street Fighter content was released as extra in-game downloadable content in 2015 and includes Ryu and Suzaku Castle, a stage inspired by Ryu's stage from the Street Fighter II series. Mega Man and Ryu returned in the following game, Super Smash Bros. Ultimate, with Ken as the latter's Echo Fighter.

=== Street Fighter III (1997) ===
Street Fighter III: New Generation debuted in the arcades on the CPS3 hardware in 1997. Street Fighter III discards most of the character roster from previous games, keeping only Ryu and Ken, introducing several new characters in their place including the grappler Alex, who was designed to be the new lead character of the game, and Gill, who replaced Bison as main antagonist. Street Fighter III introduced the "Super Arts" selection system and the ability to parry an opponent's attack.

Several months after Street Fighter III: New Generation's release came Street Fighter III: 2nd Impact, adjusting the gameplay, adding two new characters, and returning Akuma as a playable character. Street Fighter III: 3rd Strike, released in 1999 as the third and last iteration of Street Fighter III, brings back Chun-Li and adds four new characters.

The first two Street Fighter III games were ported to the Dreamcast as a compilation, Double Impact. Ports of 3rd Strike were released for the Dreamcast as a standalone game, then included in the compilation Street Fighter Anniversary Collection for the PlayStation 2 and Xbox. Gill became a playable secret character in the console versions. In 2010, Capcom announced Street Fighter III Third Strike: Online Edition.

=== Street Fighter IV (2008) ===
The original Street Fighter IV game concept, Street Fighter IV Flashback, never made it past the proposal stage. In 2007, more than eight years since the release of Street Fighter III 3rd Strike for the arcades, Capcom unveiled Street Fighter IV at a Capcom Gamers Day event in London. Conceived as a direct sequel to the early Street Fighter II games (particularly Super Street Fighter II Turbo), Street Fighter IV features the return of the original twelve world warriors and recurring hidden character Akuma, along with four new characters (as well as a new boss character) in a storyline chronologically set between Street Fighter II and Street Fighter III. The gameplay, while still 2D, features cel-shaded 3D graphics inspired by Japanese sumi-e paintings. The Super Combo system, a Street Fighter mainstay since Super Turbo, returns along with new counter-attacking techniques called "Focus Attacks" ("Saving Attacks" in Japan), as well as new "Ultra Combo" moves, similar to the Rage Gauge seen in games from SNK Playmore.

The arcade version, which runs on the Taito Type X2 hardware, was distributed in Japan in 2008, with a limited release in North America and the United Kingdom. A home version was released in 2009 for the PlayStation 3, Xbox 360, and Windows PC. This features an expanded character roster, as well as all-new animated segments that show each character's backstory, and a training mode similar to the Expert Challenges in Street Fighter EX. The cast includes six characters new to the Street Fighter series.

Super Street Fighter IV includes ten additional characters including two characters new to the franchise: Juri and Hakan. Capcom implemented character balance adjustments and added second Ultra moves for each character. The game features an improved online experience with new modes of play. The game was released in 2010 for the PlayStation 3 and Xbox 360 at a discounted price point. A portable conversion of Super Street Fighter IV for the Nintendo 3DS, Super Street Fighter IV: 3D Edition, features 3D stereoscopic technology, multiplayer, and all 35 characters from the original Super Street Fighter IV release. Super Street Fighter IV: Arcade Edition was released in 2010, containing all of the content from the console release, and featuring four additional characters: Yun and Yang from Street Fighter III, as well as Evil Ryu and Oni, an alternate version of Ryu and Akuma, respectively.

A new update for Street Fighter IV, Ultra Street Fighter IV, was released in 2014 as an arcade game, a DLC add-on for existing console versions of Super Street Fighter IV, and as a standalone game containing DLC from previous iterations. Along with various tweaks and additional modes and stages, the update adds five additional characters, consisting of Rolento, Elena, Poison and Hugo, who previously appeared in Street Fighter x Tekken, plus an all-new character, Decapre. The game arrived on next generation consoles with a PlayStation 4 version released in 2015.

=== Street Fighter V (2016) ===
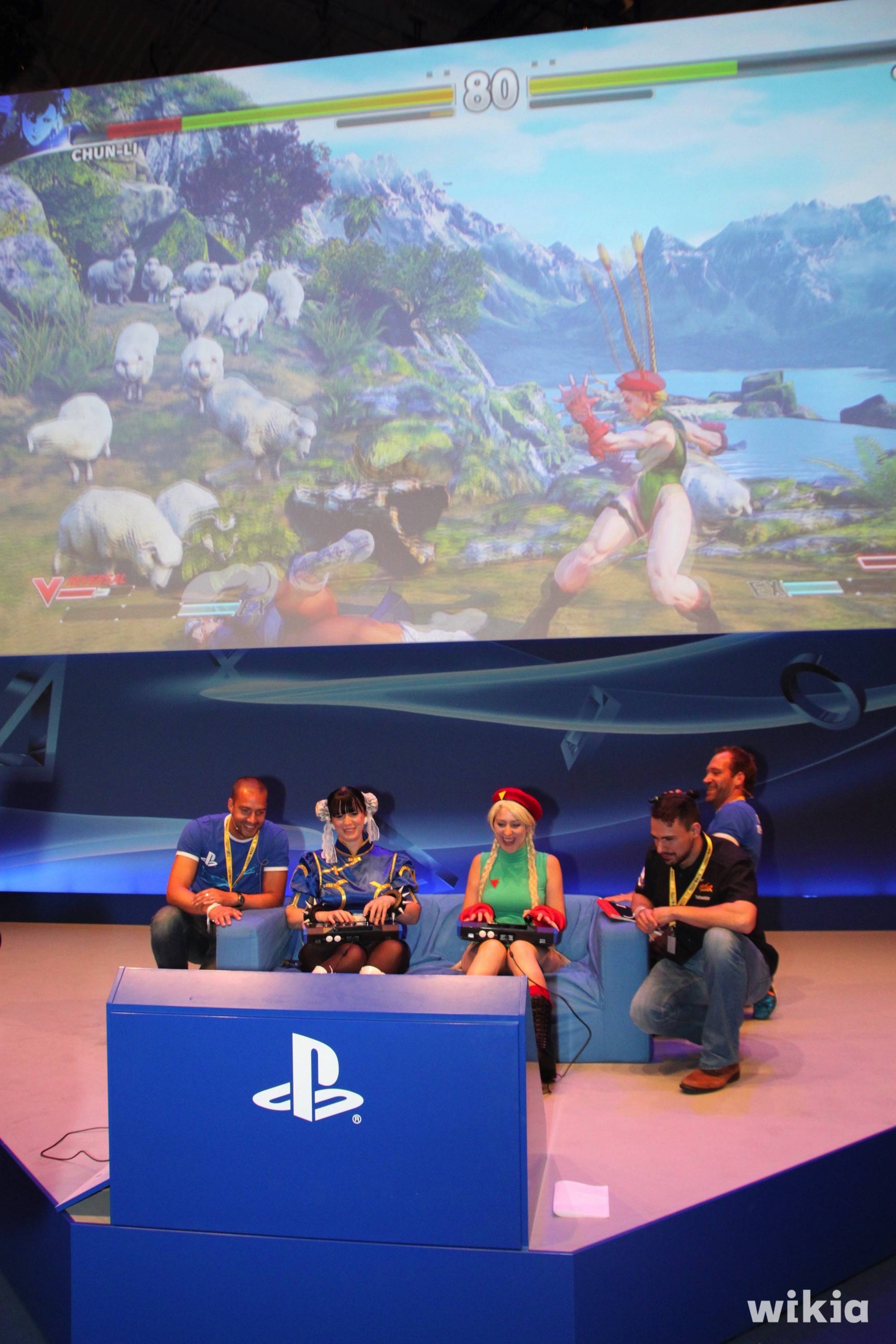
Street Fighter V demo showcase was at Gamescom 2015.

Street Fighter V was released exclusive to the PlayStation 4 and PC, enabling cross platform gameplay, in 2016 with a roster of 16 characters including Ryu, Ken, and Chun-Li. In 2018, the game received a major update, Street Fighter V: Arcade Edition. In 2020, Street Fighter V: Champion Edition was released as downloadable content with several characters progressively added and totaling 46.

=== Street Fighter 6 (2023) ===
Street Fighter 6 was released for Microsoft Windows, PlayStation 4, PlayStation 5, and Xbox Series X|S on June 2, 2023. The game is powered by the RE Engine and include multiple new features, including real-time in-game commentary and a single-player adventure mode with customizable player avatars.

=== Other games ===
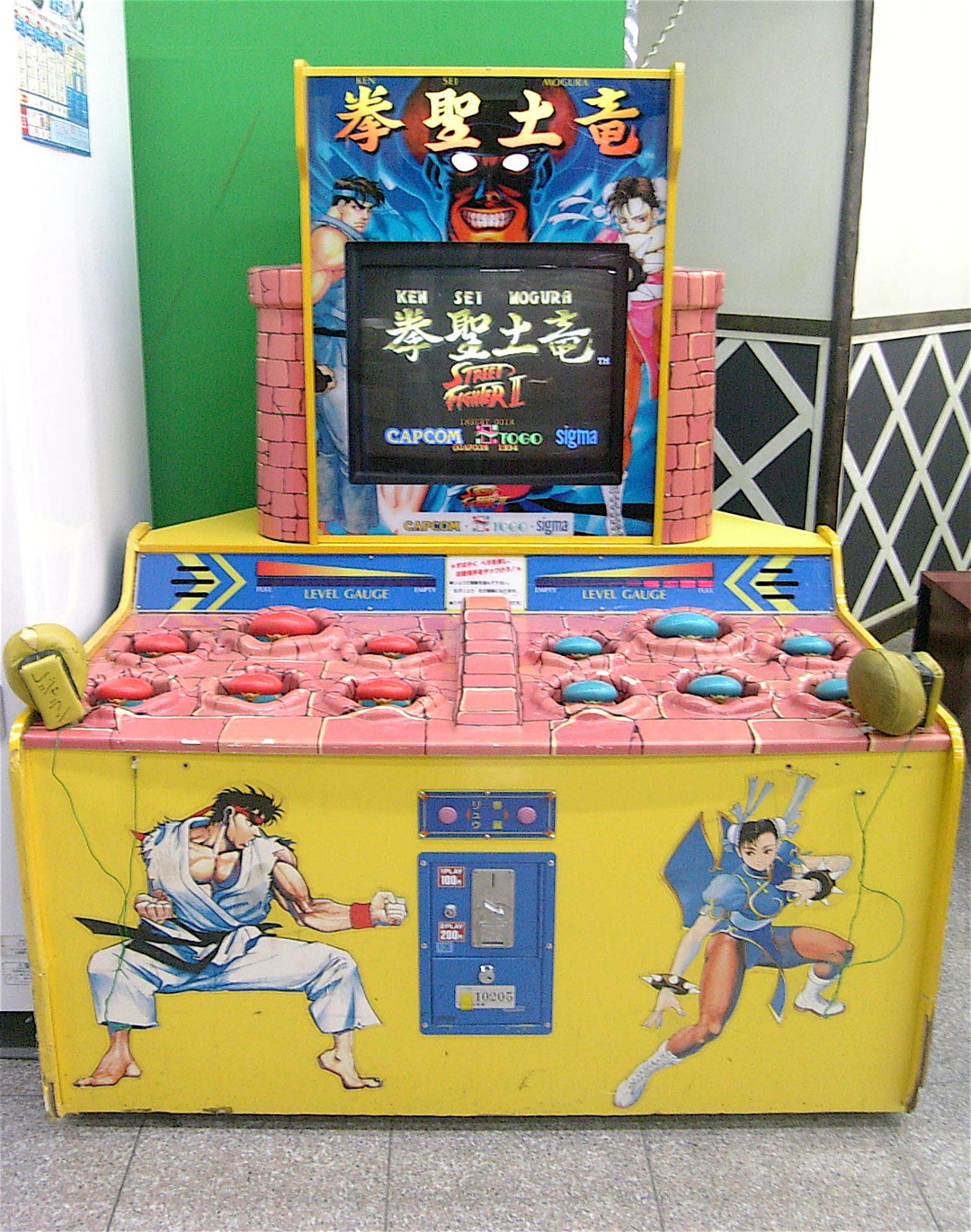
A Whac-A-Mole Street Fighter II arcade game features Ryu and Chun-Li.

- The 1990 platforming game Street Fighter 2010: The Final Fight is a non-canonical loose sequel for the NES in which a retired Ken (originally Kevin Striker, a cyborg police officer) becomes a scientist fighting to avenge the death of a friend in a futuristic interplanetary adventure.
- Two video games based on the live-action Street Fighter movie were released in 1995; one for arcades, the other for PlayStation and Sega Saturn. The game retains the fighting style of the main series, but uses digitized character sprites similar to games such as Mortal Kombat.
- Super Puzzle Fighter II Turbo is a puzzle game released in 1996, which features super deformed characters from the Street Fighter and Darkstalkers series fighting against each other by matching colored gems.
- Super Puzzle Fighter II Turbo's art style was later re-used in 1997's Super Gem Fighter Mini Mix, which is a more lighthearted take on the main fighting games featuring simpler commands.
- Street Fighter Anniversary Collection is a 2004 compilation of two games released between 1991 and 1999 in the form of Hyper Street Fighter II: The Anniversary Edition (a game that allows players to choose variations of characters from SFII to Super SFII Turbo) and Street Fighter III: 3rd Strike (the third and final installment of Street Fighter III) that originates from the Dreamcast but ported to PlayStation 2 and Xbox.
- Street Fighter 30th Anniversary Collection is a 2018 compilation of 12 games in arcade perfect form (Street Fighter III: 3rd Strike) released for PlayStation 4, Xbox One, Steam, and Nintendo Switch.
- Street Fighter characters also make cameos in the Harvey Birdman, Attorney at Law video game.
- On February 17, 2023, a virtual reality arcade single-player fighting game titled Street Fighter VR Shadaloo Enhancement Plan (ストリートファイターVR シャドルー強化計画) by Capcom was announced for testing at the Plaza Capcom store located in Hiroshima with plans to expand on April 17 to Miraino Aeon Mall in Toyokawa, Japan. The game is played on a HTC Vive Pro 2 and allows to players to take the role of an unnamed junior soldier under the recruitment under the criminal organization 'Shadaloo' as they train in a virtual environment against Ryu and Zangief of Street Fighter V to become the strongest. Assets as well as the same engine are being reused from the game, specifically with Ryu's and Zangief's character models and stages, being showcased in recent trailers with the two characters themselves as opponents with the possibilities of unlockables and plans for more characters and stages to added at later dates.

== Other media ==
=== Animation ===
- The first animation based on the Street Fighter franchise is an unofficial animation released in South Korea in 1992, Street Outlaw (Hangul: 거리의 무법자; RR: Geori-eui Mubeopja). It follows the characters Soryong and Saeng as they travel into the world of Street Fighter to defeat M. Bison. The film was produced and animated by Daiwon Animation, and directed by Sang Il Sim. The film features unlicensed cameos from other franchises, including April O'Neil, Arnold Schwarzenegger, Dracula and Frankenstein's monster. The film is largely unheard of since it was never officially released outside of South Korea.
- An anime film Street Fighter II: The Animated Movie by Group TAC was released theatrically in Japan in 1994. The English adaptation, produced by Manga Entertainment, was released on home video in 1995.
- Group TAC also produced an anime TV series Street Fighter II V, which first aired on Yomiuri TV in 1995, and a two-episode original video animation (OVA) series, Street Fighter Alpha: The Movie, which was released in 1999. English adaptations of both productions were produced by Manga Entertainment as well, though ADV Films did produce an early English adaptation of Street Fighter II V for the UK in the 1990s.
- An American-produced animated television series based on the games, Street Fighter, was produced by InVision Entertainment and aired in North America on USA Network between 1995 and 1997. The series focused on Guile as he leads a group of "Street Fighters" to battle against Bison and his minions.
- A second OVA based on Street Fighter Alpha, Street Fighter Alpha: Generations, was produced specifically for the English market by Studio A.P.P.P. in 2005.
- With the publication of the Street Fighter II manga complete edition, a short educational animation film Street Fighter: Return to the Fujiwara Capital (Street Fighter Yomigaeru Fujiwara-Kyou) was also released in 2004. In it, Ryu, Ken, Chun-Li and E.Honda travel back through time and learn about Japanese history. This film contains no battle scenes and was released only in Japan, originally on video in 1996, then re-released on DVD.
- The OVA Street Fighter IV: The Ties That Bind was released by Studio 4 °C in 2009. Street Fighter IV: The Ties That Bind is an animated movie directed by Jirō Kanai that was featured in a bonus disc included in the Collector's Edition of Street Fighter IV for the PlayStation 3 and Xbox 360. The film adaptation was part of Capcom's multi-platform launch for 2008 that also launched video games and a potential TV series in 2008.
- In Asia, a downloadable voucher for a Super Street Fighter IV movie featuring Juri was given in the Collector's Edition of the Xbox 360 version. The 35-minute feature serves as an origin story to Juri and a canonical precursor to the game. Although having been fully dubbed in English, the film was not released outside of Asia until its inclusion as part of the Street Fighter 25th Anniversary Collector's Set in 2012.
- There are four original animated trailers for Street Fighter IV that serve as prequels for its storyline.
- The 2012 animated film Wreck-It Ralph (featuring sentient video game characters inhabiting an arcade's electrical system) includes, in some brief scenes, Street Fighter and characters from the series.
- The 2018 film Ready Player One includes cameos of multiple animated Street Fighter characters, serving as avatars for humans inhabiting a virtual reality environment.

=== Live-action ===
- The first live-action film, Street Fighter, was released in 1994, starring Jean-Claude Van Damme as Guile, opposite Raúl Juliá as General M. Bison and Kylie Minogue as Cammy. It inspired an arcade game and console game, both titled Street Fighter: The Movie. It inspired an American-produced animated TV series Street Fighter from 1995 to 1997, with two seasons of 13 episodes each.
- The live-action film Street Fighter: The Legend of Chun-Li was released in 2009 starring Kristin Kreuk as Chun-Li. It received mostly negative reviews.
- Actor and filmmaker Joey Ansah co-directed Owen Trevor's 2010 live-action short film Street Fighter: Legacy, starring John Foo as Ryu and Christian Howard as Ken who co-wrote it with Ansah who also appear as Akuma. That year, Capcom confirmed more Street Fighter films in development.
- After Legacy, Ansah and Howard created the TV series, Street Fighter: Assassin's Fist, which was released on Machinima's YouTube channel in 2014, the two reprised their roles and Mike Moh replaced Foo as Ryu. A second season, Street Fighter: World Warrior, was announced for a 2017 release date, but was later canceled.
- The web miniseries, Street Fighter: Resurrection, aired on Machinima in 2016 with Moh and Howard as Ryu and Ken.
- A scene in the 2018 film Goosebumps 2: Haunted Halloween shows Slappy the Dummy using magic to bring action figures of the Street Fighter characters Ryu and Ken to life.
- An American-produced live-action film, also titled Street Fighter, was released by Paramount Pictures on October 16, 2026, in IMAX.

=== Manga and manhua ===
- Masaomi Kanzaki's Street Fighter II manga was one of the few Street Fighter manga translated into English, titled Street Fighter II in the US. Originally released by Tokuma Shoten in three volumes, the US version has been released in 8 issues by Tokuma comics (U.S. imprint of Tokuma Shoten) and rearranged in left-to-right reading format.
- Masahiko Nakahira did four different Street Fighter manga series: Cammy Gaiden, Street Fighter Zero, Street Fighter: Sakura Ganbaru!, and Street Fighter III: Ryu Final. Street Fighter Alpha, Sakura Ganbaru, and Street Fighter III: Ryu Final have all been released in English by UDON. Two characters created by Nakahira, Evil Ryu (introduced in Street Fighter Alpha) and Karin Kanzuki (from Sakura Ganbaru), have been integrated into the Street Fighter video games.
1. Super Street Fighter II: Cammy Gaiden (1994) – A manga revolving around Cammy in seven chapters. Originally published in six parts in Japan's Shonen Sunday comic anthology in 1994. Later the same year the six parts were compiled into one volume and in 1997 the compilation was first published in English by Viz Communications as Super Street Fighter II: Cammy. The seventh chapter was printed in September 1994 as a bonus supplement in Takayuki Sakai's comic adaptation of The Animated Movie as Gekijouyou Animation Street Fighter II, but was never officially translated.
2. Street Fighter III: Ryu Final (1998) – A manga adaption to the Street Fighter III series in two volumes. In 2008, a translated version was released by UDON.
3. Street Fighter: Sakura Ganbaru! (1996) – The story follows Sakura Kasugano in her quest to become a street fighter and meet Ryu. It has two volumes.
4. Street Fighter Zero (1995) – A manga about the Street Fighter Alpha series. Translated and released in English as Street Fighter Alpha.
- Street Fighter II: The Animated Movie Official Comic Adaptation is a manga adaptation of the 1994 anime film, authored by Takayuki Sakai and serialized in the monthly CoroCoro Comic in 1994, later republished in a single tankōbon collected edition. An English adaptation of this manga was published by Viz Communications as six issues in 1996.
- There is a broad selection of Street Fighter manhua comics published in Hong Kong and Taiwan in booklet format. The first one, based on Street Fighter II, was released in 1991 by Jade Dynasty. Street Fighter EX 2 Plus is a manhua by a Hong Kong artist who drew the previous Street Fighter II adaptations since 1992. Street Fighter Zero 2 HK is the original comic was only printed in Hong Kong and was prevented by Capcom from being released in Japan.

=== Comics ===
- Malibu Comics launched a Street Fighter comic series in 1993, but was canceled after only three issues due to Capcom's disapproval.
- Editora Escala published satirical stories released in 1993. The comic book featured Japanese dojinshi and parodies by Brazilian comic artists. When Malibu comics were canceled, the franchise was continued by the Brazilian publisher called Escala.
- Street Fighter: The Battle for Shadaloo based on the 1994 Street Fighter live action movie was released by DC Comics.
- Street Fighter Zero 3 is a comic based on Street Fighter Zero 3 by Marcelo Cassaro (script) and Erica Awano (art). It has four issues (1998–1999).
- UDON was licensed by Capcom to produce the Street Fighter Canadian comic book, in addition to the comic adaptations of Darkstalkers and Rival Schools. It addresses various continuity retcons, and draws from fan-fiction and non-official sources. In 2005, UDON released Street Fighter: Eternal Challenge, the first Capcom series history and art book to be translated into English. UDON continued from its original Street Fighter series (based on Street Fighter Alpha and Super Street Fighter II Turbo) with Street Fighter II and Street Fighter II: Turbo. Three separate Street Fighter Legends mini-series and a Street Fighter IV mini-series were released, followed by more comics, including a Darkstalkers crossover series.
- Street Fighter characters appear in the Archie Comics-published Sonic the Hedgehog/Mega Man crossover event Worlds Unite, which also involved other characters from Sega and Capcom games.
- In 2016, IDW Publishing published a crossover with G.I. Joe: A Real American Hero titled Street Fighter × G.I. Joe. It was written by Aubrey Sitterson with art by Emilio Laiso, and ran for six issues.
- Two motion comics were released based on Street Fighter: Round One – Fight! (issues 0–6) and Street Fighter Volume 2: The New Challengers! (issues 7–14) arcs. They were made by Eagle One Media and released in straight-to-DVD format in 2009 and 2011 respectively. It was released on Hulu for free in 2014, and later also released on Viewster for free.
- In May 2023, IDW Publishing published a five-issue crossover with Teenage Mutant Ninja Turtles titled Teenage Mutant Ninja Turtles Vs. Street Fighter.
- An upcoming graphic novel published by Legendary Comics is to be released to tie-in with the 2026 film. The graphic novel is an anthology and set prior to the film's events.

== Traditional games ==
- Irish software company CryptoLogic released a Street Fighter II slot machine themed after the series.
- In 1994, White Wolf released Street Fighter: The Storytelling Game based on the series and featuring characters from Super Street Fighter II. The system used many of the game mechanics of the World of Darkness games.
- In 2006, Sabertooth Games released a Street Fighter set for its Universal Fighting System (UFS) collectible card game.
- Another trading card game, the now-discontinued Epic Battles (released by Score Entertainment), also features Street Fighter characters, as well as characters from other fighting game franchises, such as Mortal Kombat.
- In 2018, Jasco Games launched a successful Kickstarter campaign for Street Fighter: The Miniatures Game, which was to be delivered in 2019, but was ultimately delivered in 2021 after being delayed.

== Characters ==
In addition to the characters below, several titles have also introduced characters to the Street Fighter series that are considered canon only to their respective media. This includes the Monitor Cyborg for the Street Fighter II: The Animated Movie and related game, Shin from the browser video game Street Fighter Online: Mouse Generation, and the characters Blade, Arkane, Kyber, F7, and Sawada from the arcade game based on the 1994 Street Fighter film. Several characters from the Street Fighter franchise also appear in Street Fighter EX and its subsequent re-releases and sequels. While these games introduce new characters, they have been since expanded into their own franchise under the Fighting EX Layer series, and ties to the Street Fighter cast removed. Street Fighter 6 was the first main series entry to include playable third-party guest characters, adding Terry Bogard and Mai Shiranui from SNK's Fatal Fury series in the game's second season pass and Tifa Lockhart from Square Enix's Final Fantasy VII in its fourth.

Each character below is based on their playable version in the most complete home versions of the particular game, and based on each major release. Note that with the first Street Fighter, only Ryu and Ken are normally playable. More detailed information on the characters can be found under their respective games.

Characters appearing in Street Fighter video games
Character	Street Fighter	II	Alpha	III	IV	V	6
Abel	No	No	No	No	0	Cameo	No
Abigail	No	No	Cameo	No	Cameo	2	Cameo
Adon	CPU* (Note: All characters in the original Street Fighter other than Ryu and Ken are CPU-only opponents.)	No	0	No	2	No	Cameo
Akira	No	No	No	No	No	5	No
Akuma	No	4	0	1	0	2	1
A.K.I.	No	No	No	No	No	No	1
Alex	No	No	No	0	No	1	No
Balrog	No	1 (Note: Balrog, Vega, Sagat, and M. Bison were all unplayable bosses in the original Street Fighter II, then made playable following Street Fighter II: Champion Edition.)	2	No	0	1	Cameo
Birdie	CPU*	No	0	No	No	0	Cameo
Blanka	No	0	2	No	0	3	0
C. Viper	No	No	No	No	0	Cameo	Cameo
Cammy	No	3	1	Cameo	1	0	0
Chun-Li	No	0	0	2	0	0	0
Cody	No	No	2	No	2	3	Cameo
Dan	No	No	0	No	1	5	Cameo
Decapre	No	No	No	No	4	CPU (Note: Non-playable opponents in A Shadow Falls.)	Cameo
Dee Jay	No	3	2 (Note: Console-only characters.)	Cameo	2	No	0
Dhalsim	No	0	1	No	0	0	0
Dudley	No	No	No	0	2	No	Cameo
E. Honda	No	0	2	No	0	4	0
Eagle	CPU*	No	3	No	No	No	No
Ed	No	No	No	No	Cameo	2	1
El Fuerte	No	No	No	No	0	Cameo	Cameo
Elena	No	No	No	0	4	Cameo	2
Eleven	No	No	No	No	No	5	No
Evil Ryu	No	6	1	No	3	Cameo	No
F.A.N.G.	No	No	No	No	No	0	Cameo
Falke	No	No	No	No	No	3	Cameo
Fei Long	No	3	2	No	1	Cameo	Cameo
G	No	No	No	No	No	3	Cameo
Geki	CPU*	No	No	No	No	No	No
Gen	CPU*	No	1	No	1	Cameo	Cameo
Gill	No	No	No	0	No	4	No
Gouken	No	No	Cameo	No	0	Cameo	Cameo
Guile	No	0	2	No	0	1	0
Guy	No	No	0	No	2	Cameo	Cameo
Hakan	No	No	No	No	2	Cameo	Cameo
Hugo	No	No	Cameo	1	4	Cameo	Cameo
Ibuki	No	No	No	0	2	1	No
Ingrid	No	No	4	No	No	Cameo	No
Jamie	No	No	No	No	No	No	0
Joe	CPU*	No	No	No	No	No	No
JP	No	No	No	No	No	No	0
Juli	No	No	2	No	Cameo	CPU	Cameo
Juni	No	No	2	No	Cameo	Cameo	Cameo
Juri	No	No	No	No	2	1	0
Kage	No	No	No	No	No	4	Cameo
Karin	No	No	2	No	No	0	No
Ken	0	0	0	0	0	0	0
Kimberly	No	No	No	No	No	No	0
Kolin	No	No	No	Cameo	No	2	No
Laura	No	No	No	No	No	0	Cameo
Lee	CPU*	No	No	No	No	No	No
Lily	No	No	No	No	No	No	0
Lucia	No	No	No	No	No	4	Cameo
Luke	No	No	No	No	No	5	0
M. Bison	No	1	0	No	0	0	2
Mai (Note: Third party guest character.)	No	No	No	No	No	No	2
Maki	No	No	3	No	No	Cameo	Cameo
Makoto	No	No	No	2	2	No	Cameo
Manon	No	No	No	No	No	No	0
Marisa	No	No	No	No	No	No	0
Menat	No	No	No	No	No	2	No
Mike	CPU*	No	No	No	No	Cameo	No
Nash	No	No	0	No	Cameo	0	Cameo
Necalli	No	No	No	No	No	0	No
Necro	No	No	No	0	No	Cameo	No
Oni	No	No	No	No	3	Cameo	No
Oro	No	No	No	0	No	5	No
Poison	No	No	Cameo	Cameo	4	4	Cameo
Q	No	No	No	2	No	No	No
R. Mika	No	No	2	No	No	0	Cameo
Rashid	No	No	No	No	No	0	1
Remy	No	No	No	2	No	No	No
Retsu	CPU*	No	No	No	No	No	CPU (Note: Non-playable opponent in World Tour mode.)
Rolento	No	No	1	No	4	Cameo	No
Rose	No	No	0	No	1	5	No
Rufus	No	No	No	No	0	No	Cameo
Ryu	0	0	0	0	0	0	0
Sagat	CPU*	1	0	No	0	3	Cameo
Sakura	No	No	1	No	1	3	Cameo
Sean	No	No	No	0	No	Cameo	Cameo
Seth	No	No	No	No	0	4	Cameo
Shin Akuma	No	5	1	1 (Note: Shin Akuma is playable only in the console version of 2nd Impact and does not appear in 3rd Strike.)	No	CPU	No
Sodom	No	No	0	No	Cameo	Cameo	No
T. Hawk	No	3	2	Cameo	2	No	Cameo
Terry	No	No	No	No	No	No	2
Twelve	No	No	No	2	No	No	No
Urien	No	No	No	1	No	1	No
Vega	No	1	2	No	0	0	Cameo
Violent Ken	No	6	No	No	No	No	No
Yang	No	No	Cameo	0	3	No	Cameo
Yun	No	No	3	0	3	No	Cameo
Zangief	No	0	1	Cameo	0	0	0
Zeku	No	No	Cameo	No	No	2	Cameo
Total	2	20	38	21	44	16+30 DLC	18+16 DLC

Notes

World map showing the number of characters from each country.

== Reception ==
=== Achievements ===
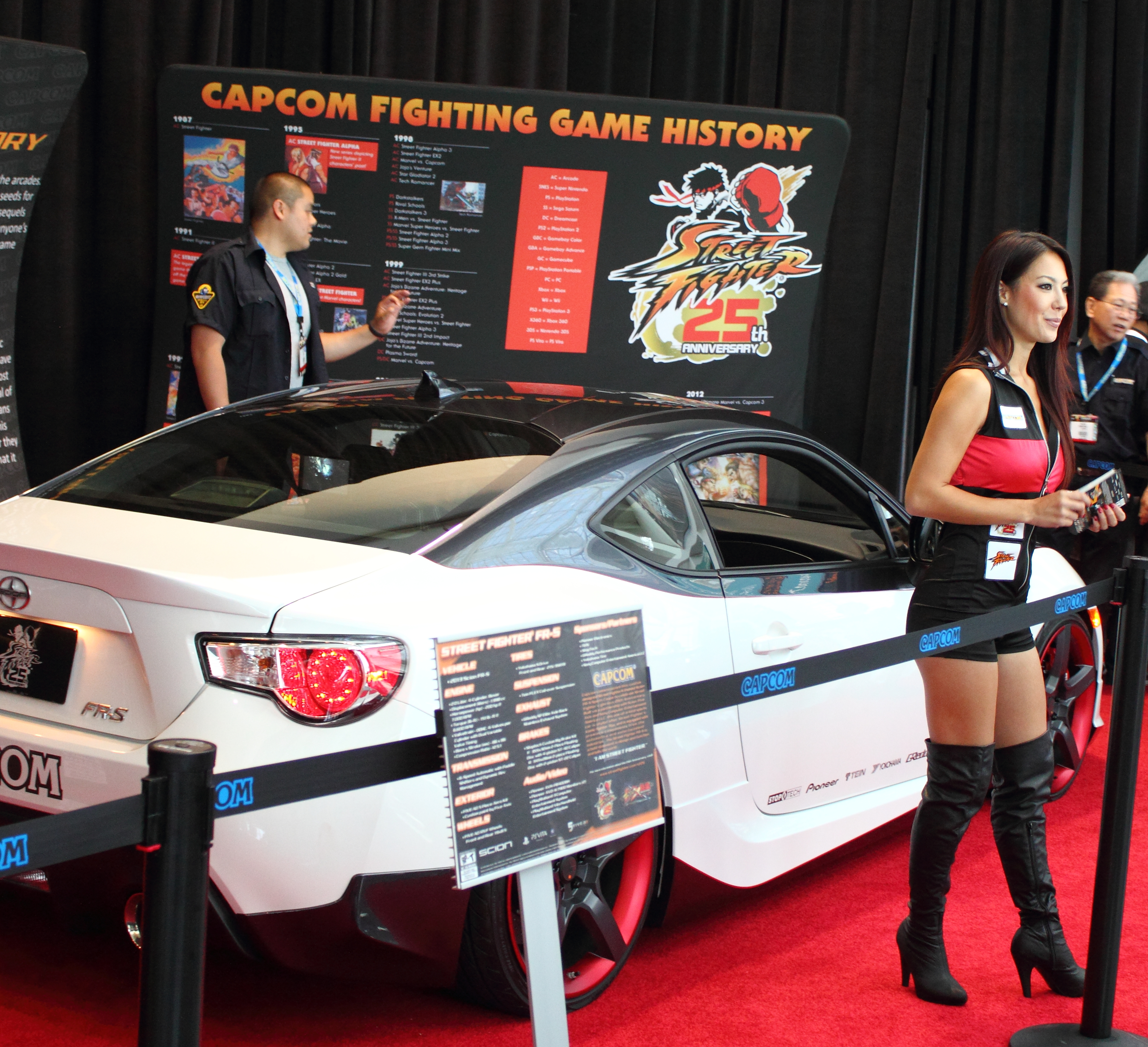
The 25th anniversary event was at the Electronic Entertainment Expo 2012.

Since the release of the first Street Fighter game in August 1987, the series had total home software sales of 35 million units by 2014, and 46 million units as of 2021, in addition to arcade cabinet sales of over 500,000 units generating more than $1 billion in revenue in video game arcade cabinet sales, qualifying it for the list of best-selling video game franchises. Street Fighter has remained Capcom's second-biggest franchise behind Resident Evil as of 2014, and is Capcom's third-best-selling software franchise behind Resident Evil and Monster Hunter.

The best-selling game in the series is Street Fighter II, with more than $10 billion in total gross revenue from all versions, mostly from arcades. More than 14 million Super NES and Sega Mega Drive/Genesis cartridges were sold. As of 2017, Street Fighter II is one of the world's top three highest-grossing Japan-made arcade blockbusters of all time, after Taito's Space Invaders and Namco's Pac-Man.

=== Commercial performance ===
In 1994, Capcom referred to Street Fighter as "the most successful video game series of the decade" while promoting Super Street Fighter II.

Title	Year	Platform(s)	Software sales (est.)			Gross revenue (est.)	
Title	Year	Platform(s)	Worldwide	Japan	Overseas	Japan	Overseas
Final Fight (Street Fighter '89)	1990	SNES	1,480,000	860,000	620,000	¥8,041,000,000	$37,193,800
Final Fight One (Final Fight)	2001	GBA	56,137+	56,137	Unknown	¥296,403,360	Unknown
Street Fighter II	1991	Multi-platform	15,500,000	6,515,373 (Note: See Street Fighter II § Commercial)	8,984,627	$10,610,000,000 (Note: Including Street Fighter II arcade game revenue and home software sales)	
Street Fighter: The Movie	1995	Saturn	62,375+	62,375	Unknown	¥397,952,500	Unknown
Street Fighter: The Movie	1995	PS1	121,765+	38,427	83,338+	¥245,164,260	$4,996,113
Street Fighter Alpha (Street Fighter Zero)	1995	PS1	494,076+	350,267	143,809+	¥2,234,703,460	$8,627,102
Street Fighter Alpha (Street Fighter Zero)	1996	Saturn	291,362+	291,362	Unknown	¥1,858,889,560	Unknown
Street Fighter Alpha 2 (Street Fighter Zero 2)	1996	PS1	721,276+	604,957	116,319+	¥3,859,625,660	$6,973,324
Street Fighter Alpha 2 (Street Fighter Zero 2)	1996	Saturn	403,405+	403,405	Unknown	¥2,573,723,900	Unknown
Street Fighter Alpha 2 (Street Fighter Zero 2)	1996	SNES	77,853+	77,853	Unknown	¥667,978,740	Unknown
Street Fighter Collection	1997	Saturn, PS1	150,311+	150,311	Unknown	¥958,984,180	Unknown
Street Fighter Alpha 3 (Street Fighter Zero 3)	1998	PS1	1,000,000	503,562	496,438	¥3,212,725,560	$21,341,870
Street Fighter Alpha 3: Saikyo Dojo	1999	Dreamcast	120,561+	51,510	69,051+	¥328,633,800	$3,106,604
Street Fighter Alpha 3↑	2002	GBA	30,004+	5,025	24,975+	¥26,532,000	$724,025
Street Fighter Alpha 3 MAX	2006	PSP	410,894+	10,894	400,000+	¥57,520,320	$11,996,000
Street Fighter Alpha Anthology	2006	PS2	27,328+	27,328	Unknown	¥144,291,840	Unknown
Super Puzzle Fighter II Turbo	1996	PS1	75,122+	11,594	63,528+	¥73,969,720	$1,905,840
Super Puzzle Fighter II Turbo	1996	Saturn	11,742+	11,742	Unknown	¥68,103,600	Unknown
Pocket Fighter (Super Gem Fighter Mini Mix)	1998	PS1	149,137+	105,607	43,530+	¥673,772,660	$1,871,355
Pocket Fighter (Super Gem Fighter Mini Mix)	1998	Saturn	19,026+	19,026	—N/a	¥121,385,880	—N/a
X-Men vs. Street Fighter	1997	Saturn	193,970+	193,970	—N/a	¥1,237,528,600	—N/a
X-Men vs. Street Fighter	1998	PS1	244,511+	119,017	125,494+	¥759,328,460	$6,273,445
Marvel Super Heroes vs. Street Fighter	1998	Saturn	93,701+	93,701	—N/a	¥597,812,380	—N/a
Marvel Super Heroes vs. Street Fighter	1999	PS1	180,620+	60,724	119,896+	¥387,419,120	$5,154,329
Street Fighter EX Plus α	1997	PS1	837,052+	203,803	633,249+ (Note: 233,249 units in the United States. 400,000+ units in PAL regions.)	¥1,300,263,140	$31,656,118
Street Fighter EX2 Plus	1999	PS1	147,177+	66,052	81,125+	¥421,411,760	$2,839,375
Street Fighter EX3	2000	PS2	183,974+	183,974	Unknown	¥1,376,125,520	Unknown
Street Fighter III: Double Impact	1999	Dreamcast	106,008+	51,510	54,498+	¥385,294,800	$2,342,869
Street Fighter III: 3rd Strike	2000	Dreamcast	116,987+	56,741	60,246+	¥362,007,580	$2,589,976
Street Fighter III: 3rd Strike	2004	PS2	49,088+	49,088	Unknown	¥313,181,440	Unknown
Slotter Up Core 7: Dekitou da! Street Fighter II	2005	PS2	15,700+	15,700	—N/a	¥81,169,000	—N/a
Street Fighter IV	2009	Multi-platform	10,200,000 (all versions)	810,405 (Note: See Street Fighter IV § Sales)	8,398,708	¥4,715,097,284	$401,843,119
Street Fighter X Tekken	2012	PS3, X360	1,900,000	101,129	1,698,871	¥740,567,667	$101,915,271
Street Fighter X Tekken	2012	Steam	188,453	—N/a	188,453	—N/a	$11,305,295
Street Fighter X Tekken	2012	PSV	13,550+	13,550	Unknown	¥70,839,400	Unknown
Street Fighter V	2016	PS4, PC	8,000,000	135,362	3,964,638	¥1,189,696,618	$237,518,767
Street Fighter 30th Anniversary Collection	2018	PS4, Switch, PC, Xbox One	3,400,000	31,653	Unknown	¥173,743,317	Unknown
Street Fighter 30th Anniversary Collection	2018	Steam	20,000+	—N/a	20,000+	—N/a	$799,800
Street Fighter 6	2023	PS4, PS5, PC, Xbox Series X	7,000,000	—N/a	—N/a	—N/a	—N/a
Total			56,000,000	12,343,134	31,656,866	¥39,952,847,086+ ($495,667,248+) (Note: Not including Street Fighter II, which has grossed an estimated $10.61 billion worldwide as of 2017)	$902,974,397+
Total			56,000,000	12,343,134	31,656,866	$12,009,123,687 (Note: Including Street Fighter II, which has grossed an estimated $10.61 billion worldwide as of 2017)	

== Esports ==
Daigo Umehara, known as "Daigo" or "The Beast" in the West and "Umehara" or "Ume" in Japan, is the world's most famous Street Fighter player and is often considered its greatest. He currently holds a world record of "the most successful player in major tournaments of Street Fighter" in the Guinness World Records.

"Evo Moment 37", also known as the "Daigo Parry", refers to a portion of a Street Fighter III: 3rd Strike semi-final match held at Evolution Championship Series 2004 (Evo 2004) between Daigo Umehara and Justin Wong. During this match, Umehara made an unexpected comeback by parrying 15 consecutive hits of Wong's "Super Art" move while having only one pixel of vitality. Umehara subsequently won the match. "Evo Moment #37" is frequently described as the most iconic and memorable moment in the history of competitive video gaming. Being at one point the most-watched competitive gaming moment of all time, it has been compared to sports moments such as Babe Ruth's called shot and the Miracle on Ice.

Hajime "Tokido" Taniguchi is currently ranked as the #1 Street Fighter V eSports player in the world per SRK Data eSports player rankings. Hailing from Japan, he is a three time EVO champion and generally recognized one of the best fighters that ever played the game.

Mike "BrolyLegs" Begum was also a well known "disabled" player who had been ranked as high as 378 in the world and featured on ESPN E:60 for operating the game controller with only his mouth.

== In popular culture ==
Street Fighter influenced mixed martial arts (MMA) combat sports. The first Ultimate Fighting Championship (UFC) MMA event. During the 1993 release of UFC 1 while Super Street Fighter II and Mortal Kombat II were best sellers, both were initially pitched by UFC promoters as a real-life fighting video game tournament.

Street Fighter II has been sampled and referenced video game in hip hop music, including The Lady of Rage, Nicki Minaj, Lupe Fiasco, Megan Thee Stallion, Dizzee Rascal, Lil B, Sean Price, and Madlib. This started with Hi-C's "Swing'n" (1993) and DJ Qbert's "Track 10" (1994) which sampled Street Fighter II, and the Street Fighter film soundtrack (1994) which is the first major film soundtrack to consist almost entirely of hip hop music. According to DJ Qbert, "I think hip-hop is a cool thing, I think Street Fighter is a cool thing". According to Vice magazine, "Street Fighter's mixture of competition, bravado, and individualism easily translate into the trials and travails of a rapper." Grime DJ Logan Sama saying, "Street Fighter is just a huge cultural thing that everyone experienced growing up [with] such a huge impact that it has just stayed in everyone's consciousness." According to Jake Hawkes of Soapbox, "grime was built around lyrical clashes [and] the 1v1 setup of these clashes was easily equated with Street Fighter's 1 on 1 battles." Grime MCs such as Dizzee Rascal were sampling Street Fighter II in 2002, and Street Fighter II has been sampled "by almost every grime MC". It became an integral part of BBC Radio 1Xtra DJ Charlie Sloth's Fire in the Booth freestyle segments, using samples such as "Hadouken", "Shoryuken", and the "Perfect" announcer sound.

== See also ==
- List of Street Fighter Grand Slam champions
