= Dudley (Street Fighter) =

Playable Street Fighter character

- Street Fighter character
- Dudley in Street Fighter III: 3rd Strike
- First appearance: Street Fighter III (1997)
- Voiced by: English: Bruce Robertson; Francis Diakowsky (3rd Strike); Stuart McLean (SSFIV, SFxT); Japanese: Naomi Kusumi (SSFIV, SFxT)

In-universe information
- Fighting style: Boxing
- Origin: United Kingdom
- Nationality: English

Dudley (Japanese: ダッドリー, Hepburn: Daddorī) is a fictional character in Capcom's Street Fighter video game series. He made his debut in 1997's Street Fighter III: New Generation and also appeared in the game's two updates, 2nd Impact and 3rd Strike.

Unlike the other boxer character of the series, the villainous Balrog, Dudley is portrayed as a well-mannered English gentleman. In the games, he also has far less lofty motivations than other characters—Dudley's storylines in the games have him recovering his father's antique Jaguar XK120 (in Street Fighter III and Street Fighter III: 2nd Impact), training for an upcoming boxing competition to be attended by the royal family (in Street Fighter III: Third Strike), or looking for roses to plant in his garden (in Super Street Fighter IV).

Dudley has been well received and has been named as one of the characters players want to see in future Street Fighter installments. As a result, he appeared as a playable character in the Street Fighter IV update Super Street Fighter IV and as downloadable content for Street Fighter X Tekken.

== Conception and design ==
During the development of Street Fighter III: New Generation, the development team considered how boxing was seen as a "gentleman's sport" that was "currently being perfected in England". Feeling they had only previously portrayed boxing as being used by villainous characters in previous Street Fighter games, they chose England as Dudley's country of origin, and built the character's framework from there. Of all the characters, producer Tomoshi Sadamoto considered Dudley the easiest to finalize.

Dudley's outfit consists of green dress pants with green suspenders worn over a short-sleeved, collared white shirt with ruffles on the chest. He wears a green bowtie and dress shoes. His hair is cut short and smooth with a well-kept mustache. On his hands are blue boxing gloves with a gold trim. When creating his design, they gave him pronounced shoulders to emphasize his role as a boxer. Additional artwork also frequently displayed him enjoying tea, to help emphasize his British nationality.

== Appearances ==
Dudley is an upper class heavyweight boxer from Britain with powerful techniques and speed. He seeks perfection both in and out of the ring, always behaving as an impeccable gentleman. He is also the son of an athlete who later became a successful businessman. When his father's business began to fail when he was in college, Dudley was able to recover his losses thanks to his boxing career. In Street Fighter III: 2nd Impact, he fights outside a London pub called the Sherlock Holmes, while Knightsbridge tube station and the Harrods department store can be seen in his 3rd Strike background. When his father's prized Jaguar is purchased from a debtor's auction, Dudley goes after the buyer, a man named Gill. In Street Fighter III: 3rd Strike, Dudley has received the honorary title of "Sir" after making a comeback and winning the championship title, and is invited into a contest that will be held in the presence of the royal family. Now known as Sir Dudlington, he decides to travel the world and improve himself before the day of the match.

In Super Street Fighter IV, Dudley returns as a playable character and joins the tournament in search of new roses for his garden. He also claims he needs something to get his mind off of his missing car and encounters Balrog who challenges him to a fight. In his ending, he is shown lamenting the fact that he was unable to procure the new roses for his garden. As he does so, Dudley notices a flower bloom and comments on its beauty to his butler, Mr Gotch. He also appears via DLC in Street Fighter X Tekken with his official tag partner, Elena.

=== Gameplay ===
Dudley's Cross Counter is a homage to the boxing manga and anime series Ashita no Joe, in which the lead character takes a blow to the face in order to deal an even more powerful blow to the enemy's face. His "Machine Gun Blow" is also similar to the particular style of drawing multiple rapid-fire jabs in Hajime No Ippo. His corkscrew blow pays homage to Kid McCoy, and finally, his "Rolling Thunder" Super Art is simply an extended, sped up Dempsey roll. Dudley is a "command motion" character, as opposed to a charge motion character like the preceding Street Fighter boxing character Balrog, although in his appearances in Super Street Fighter IV and onward, he is given a new attack that requires a charge motion to execute. Dudley's "Jet Uppercut" is a mimicry of Ansatsuken fighters' (Ken and Ryu) Shoryuken, but differs in that Dudley turns quickly after striking the opponent, and rises higher with less horizontal range, and such it is not as suitable for anti-air purposes.

== Promotion and reception ==
To promote the release of New Generation, several items of merchandise were created featuring Dudley such as phone cards. Meanwhile, for 3rd Strike's Online Edition, player avatar items of the character were released for Sony's PlayStation Network. Dudley's image was also used for in-game cosmetic items in Street Fighter 6.

Dudley was well received upon debut, with many media outlets considering him an improvement over Balrog. Gavin Jasper of Den of Geek stated that while Street Fighter III had incorporated many character archetypes to replicate those of the preceding games, he appreciated that by comparison Dudley was completely different from Balrog. Dudley was instead presented as a character that emphasized speed and precision instead of pure power and hardheaded anger, coming across as both suave and refined. He further added that Dudley is "everything Balrog isn’t, except equally exceptional with his two fists".

The staff of GamesRadar+ described Dudley as "the modern day equivalent of the archetypal chivalrous knight of old", particularly in how he always acted in a refined manner and despite both his financial hardships and role as a combatant he was portrayed with "graceful and refined countenance". They appreciated how this was portrayed through his character design and behavior also, which they called the very picture of a gentleman fighter. Additional praise went to his ending for Street Fighter IV where he finds appreciation in a wild rose that has begun growing in his garden, as they felt it helped illustrate the mentality that regardless of mankind's strides, "nothing compares to the beauty of a natural flower".

Destructoid community manager "Occams Electric Toothbrush" meanwhile cited Dudley as an example of someone in video gaming intrinsically tied to what being a black person meant to him, and one he always held respect for. Elaborating, he echoed many of the sentiments of others regarding the character, particularly emphasizing Dudley's style and manner of dress, and how he strove to put himself forth as the perfect gentleman in all things. He further praised how the character treated boxing not as a means of glory but about the art and improving oneself. He added that Dudley had a "beautiful sense of sense", and a man he wanted to emulated in life.

Retronauts meanwhile praised his gameplay, in both animation and presentation and how it emphasized his fighting style. They felt the developers were able to illustrate more fighting techniques particularly from manga portrayals of boxing in a way Capcom had not been able to with Balrog, who was built more to punch directly. They noted that Dudley was also able to incorporate motions of actual boxers in subtle ways, such as Muhammad Ali's foot shuffle during his idle animation, stating a lot of love went into his character as a whole. Suriel Vazquez and Eric Van Allen of Paste cited Dudley as a "prime example of how evocative Street Fighter characters can be without resorting to stereotypes", emphasizing that while Dudley was British the player was never given the sense that Capcom dumped a bunch of British imagery into his character and instead incorporated them well. They further called him one of the most "consistently dazzling characters to watch", able to make the fights feel like actual boxing matches.
