= Juri (Street Fighter) =

Street Fighter character

Juri Han
- Street Fighter character
- Juri in Street Fighter 6 (2023)
- First appearance: Super Street Fighter IV (2010)
- Created by: Yoshinori Ono
- Voiced by: EN: Jessica Straus; JA: Eri Kitamura

In-universe information
- Fighting style: Taekwondo
- Origin: South Korea
- Nationality: South Korean

Juri Han (Japanese:ハン・ジュリ) Street Fighter series. She made her first appearance in 2010's Super Street Fighter IV. In the series, she is a South Korean Taekwondo fighter employed by S.I.N. and an underling to the main antagonist of Street Fighter IV, Seth.

Juri originated as a suggestion to introduce a female Korean character in the Street Fighter series and the development team went through 400–500 ideas before deciding on Juri. She is the first practitioner of Taekwondo and the series' first Korean character. Juri has been described as "sultry", and she is unique within the series due to her practice of Taekwondo.

== Character design ==
Juri's character concept was created from a suggestion by Yoshinori Ono to introduce a female Korean character into the Street Fighter series, with the initial design selected from 400–500 ideas, amongst which included an old woman and an ice skater. The final concept was intended to be someone "bad and somewhat erotic," with Taekwondo selected as her martial art over suggestions such as a sports-themed style, due to its lack of representation in the series and feeling that a character that used primarily kicks could be interesting. A mixed martial arts style was also considered, but the team chose to focus on a more iconic fighting style. Ono stated that they were planning on adding a Korean character since soon after Street Fighter II became popular in South Korea. However, the South Korean government had a strict limitation against the Japanese language and culture, preventing them from including such a character. However, both Fatal Fury and Tekken have had Korean characters since 1992 and 1995 respectively so this excuse of the South Korean government limitations might not be accurate. After the release of Street Fighter IV, Capcom Korea demanded to Ono that should another Street Fighter game be released, that it include a Korean character. While other fighting games had Korean characters already, Capcom Korea and Korean fighting game fans held the sentiment that it didn't matter "unless there was one in the series that started it all." Ono commented that when a new character is introduced, "you want to make them a good guy, you know a 'fighter for justice' or a 'friend of good' so to speak, but this time we decided to go kind of a different route with this character." He went on to describe her as "kind of nasty, she's kind of mean—somewhat twisted in fact." The developers debated which of the game's villains to align her with, M. Bison or Seth, before settling on the latter due to her being a new addition to the series.

Juri's shirt was modeled after a spider, and left the sides of her breasts exposed at Ono's suggestion. Her pants were designed to give a "silhouette that looks like a Taekwondo uniform." The black trim on her pants was added to set her apart from other Street Fighter characters who wear similar uniforms. Her colour scheme was originally plain. However, when lined up with other characters, she didn't stand out; as a result, they employed hot pink, a colour not used in any other female character in the game. They added black details to her outfit to make it less "frivolous." A pink crystal, known as the Feng Shui Engine, was added as a replacement inside her left eye after deciding to align her with Seth, in order to more closely tie her character to the organization. The crystal was originally in her stomach, similar to Seth. Other ideas were considered, including having it in one of her palms, one of her legs, or one of her ankles. They eventually settled on putting it in her eye, with design director Kamei commenting that a "big globe in the stomach of a female character wasn't going to look very attractive." He also commented that an eye is a logical place to have an artificial replacement, as well as already being spherical.

Initially, Juri was designed to be chubbier and cuter. Gradually the design was made slimmer, though the team noted at some point they had realized they had overdone it and reversed the changes slightly. She was given full legs, and a slender upper body in order to show the contrast. Kamei wanted to make her even more slender, but decided that if she was too small, her kicks would lack impact. Several designs were considered for her face, going through about seven versions before settling on her current appearance, though time constraints played a part in the decision.

Attention was paid to Taekwondo users in other fighting games in an attempt to keep the character fresh and original, implementing several actual techniques as a result but altering their appearance to make them different but recognizable, describing it as "her style." Her projectile attacks were modeled after the concept of using ki from one's surroundings, which the developers joking compared to Dragon Ball's Goku's "spirit bomb" attack. However, it was noted that her use of ki was different from that by the developers due to coming from a man-made device. Developer Tamamura suggested that in order to make it look unique, they should make it "cotton candy-like." He explained that as opposed to using energy from nature, Juri would "forcibly taking nature's power, twining it around, and throwing it out."

During the development of the game, several developers became fans of hers', with writer Kawasaki describing their fandom as being "I'm gonna use this character! She's so cool!" rather than them liking her just because they made the game. In response to fan complaints that Juri seemed too similar to previous character Chun-Li, Capcom responded by stating the two were nothing alike, and added that it would be like comparing two other male characters to one another simply because they utilized punches.

=== Personality and attributes ===
Juri's personality was proposed by Ono to be a strong character, and while laughing compared it to that of a protester. She was originally designed to be a nice person who happens to be consorting with bad characters, but Ono went against this, stating "she can't be a good girl. Surprise everyone and make her a really evil chick." Her quotes were designed to have a lot of double entendres, with writer Kawasaki, citing one quote that while it appears as a compliment of their physique, her opponent may take offense to it. Initially, she was designed to be always smiling, similar to other female characters according to developer Kamei. However, it did not fit, resulting in the team working on other faces, some he describes as "scary." The team eventually settled on a "cool-headed" look. Kamei commented that one of his favourite expressions of Juri's is the one she makes when she appears to be having fun; he adds that this look made him feel like the animators had finally began to understand the character. In designing her eyes, Kamei wanted her eyes to have more expression to them than other characters, commenting that the team "wanted her to tell a story with her eyes." Because of the anger from Korean fans over the lack of a Korean character in Street Fighter, the team decided to make her a strong character. Juri is said to have a warlike and provocative character and enjoys playing around with her opponent while beating them. She has also been described in a similar fashion, including "sex-crazed" and "sultry." Developer Tamamura describes her as a "pleasure-seeker" and a "character who would enjoy fighting."

== Appearances ==
Juri first introduced in Super Street Fighter IV. At an early age, her parents were killed by Shadaloo agents, during which her left eye was damaged. Years later, she has become an agent of S.I.N. known as "Spider". She has a ki booster implanted inside her left eye called the Feng Shui Engine (風水エンジン). An anime centering on Juri, produced by Studio Gonzo and Afro Samurai director Fuminori Kizaki, was included in the Japanese Xbox 360 version of Super Street Fighter IV. Although having been fully dubbed in English, the film was not released outside of Asia until its inclusion as part of the Street Fighter 25th Anniversary Collector's Set in 2012.

Juri appears as a playable character in the crossover fighting game Street Fighter X Tekken with her official tag partner, M. Bison. Juri also appears in the crossover tactical role-playing game Project X Zone, its sequel Project X Zone 2 and in the mobile puzzle game Street Fighter: Puzzle Spirits.

Juri appears as a playable character in Street Fighter V; she was released via downloadable content in July 2016.

In 2017, Juri appeared along with Bison and Cammy in Shadowverse.

=== Gameplay ===
Juri using her Feng Shui Engine technique.

Juri's fighting style focuses on the "power and range" of kicks. As a practitioner of Taekwondo, she fights almost exclusively with her feet and rarely strikes with her hands. She has been described as "agile and quick, but with low stamina." Street Fighter player Justin Wong described her as a unique character, comparing her to a "Guilty Gear type of character," citing her dive kicks in part for this. GamePro editor Heidi Kemps commented that she is a character who is "geared towards competitive players who enjoy screwing with their opponents' minds just as much as they enjoy slugging them in the face." GamesRadar also described her as a character who "functions best when she's on the offensive and shutting down opponents before they can even get into position." Developer Okada described her as a "hectic character," a quality that the developers had decided on from the beginning. She was created with the intention of making players see her as a character with potential; Okada commented that he wanted to instill a feeling of "If I keep playing with this character, I bet I could do some really cool stuff" in players. Developer Tamamura commented that players of Yun and Yang from Street Fighter III would enjoy playing with her. Seth Killian, Capcom Special Advisor to Super Street Fighter IV, described Juri as "one of the most versatile characters." He commented that she is a threat from mid-range as well as further away because of her dive kick, but theorized that characters like Zangief, Ryu, and Sagat would give Juri trouble due to their mobility and hard-hitting attacks.

Juri has a number of special techniques; all of which utilize quarter-circle, shoryuken and similar motions. These include a quick flip kick, a dive kick and a technique called Fuhajin kick, which allows fireballs to be fired from her feet. These fireballs can be controlled by the strength of the kick input; depending on it, the fireballs will travel at different angles. Players may also store fireballs by holding down the kick button. 1UP.com editor Richard Li compared this mechanic to Gilgamesh's from Fate/unlimited codes. Players may store three sets of fireballs by holding three buttons to charge them, choosing to release them in tandem or one-by-one. GamesRadar editor Brett Elston commented that while her dive kick was "so much fun that it's almost irresistible," it "shouldn't be your first choice every time you get into the air." He adds that the move is so overused by Juri players that players can beat them without attacking. Juri's special attacks include the Senpusha wheel kick and the Shikusen triple air kick. Her ultra attacks include the Feng Shui Engine, which allows her normal attacks to chain upwards for a short time; and the Kaisen Dankairaku. In one of her ultra moves, she was intended to kiss the opponent's cheek, but this was toned down. Okada commented that other ideas were so extreme that the game would have needed a higher content rating. She also has a pinwheel kick attack, which acts as an "offensive chip damage" attack. In discussing the pinwheel kick, developer Tamamura commented that females in fighting games typically have attacks with several hits to them, describing this move as an example of how she likes to show off. A dodge technique was implemented as a means of reflecting her personality, with developer Okada stating that it is a move that "puts her opponent off balance." He goes on to describe her as "one of the fastest and trickiest characters in Street Fighter history."

== Promotion and reception ==
A resin statue of Juri was created by SOTA Toys and made available for the release of Super Street Fighter IV. A Character Popularity Poll made by Capcom in late 2017 revealed that Juri is the third most popular character in the Street Fighter franchise. Professional wrestler Zelina Vega cosplayed as Juri at The 2023 Royal Rumble, to promote the character's appearance in Street Fighter 6.

Since appearing in Super Street Fighter IV, Juri was well received by critics. The Escapist described Juri as "jarring", praising Capcom for trying to take risks with the character design, but at the same time questioning how well the character meshes with Street Fighter IV's main cast. IGN editor Ryan Clements stated that he was most excited to try out Juri, attributing this to his "recent fascination with K-pop." He called her an "excellent addition to the roster" after playing a few rounds with her. Street Fighter player Justin Wong described her as "very unique", comparing her to Fatal Fury character Kim Kaphwan, a comparison GameSpot writer Ricardo Torres also made. Game Informer editor Dan Ryckert called Juri his "personal favorite," citing her fighting style. GamePro editor Heidi Kemps commented that "after spending time with her, I think I've found my new favorite Street Fighter IV character." UGO Networks placed Juri at #13 on their list of Top 50 Street Fighter Characters", stating: "Juri is a fast and agile cyberneticaly enhanced fighter and during the course of Super Street Fighter IV". 1UP.com writer Neidel Cirsan listed Juri as one of the characters they wanted to see in Street Fighter X Tekken, feeling that Juri was one of Capcom's best fighting game character designs.

While she is popular in North America and Japan, she was more poorly received in Korea; Street Fighter developer Yoshinori Ono commented that he had received angry mail reading "Koreans don't have hair like that!" He responded by saying that Street Fighter characters are generally not accurate to their respective origins, citing Blanka and Dhalsim. Additionally, GamesRadar named Juri as one of the best new characters of 2010, stating: "Juri's overall aesthetic appeal is quite strong even if you don't spend hours a day honing mixups and perfecting your FADCs. Her bare stomach is an obvious center of attention, but we're more taken in by the violet colors, lens-flaring robo-eyeball and her spiderlike top that slithers across her shoulders."
