= Street Fighter (video game) =

1987 video game

- North American arcade flyer
- Developer: Capcom (Note: Amiga, Amstrad CPC, Atari ST, ZX Spectrum and initial Commodore 64 versions developed by Tiertex; North American C64 version developed by Pacific Dataworks; TurboGrafx-CD version developed by Alfa System; MS-DOS version developed by Hi Tech Expressions.)
- Publishers: Capcom: Amiga, Atari ST, CPC, ZX Spectrum U.S. Gold C64; EU: U.S. Gold; NA: Capcom
- Director: Takashi Nishiyama
- Designer: Hiroshi Matsumoto
- Programmer: Hiroshi Koike
- Artist: Keiji Inafune
- Composer: Yoshihiro Sakaguchi
- Series: Street Fighter
- Platforms: Arcade, ZX Spectrum, Amiga, Amstrad CPC, Atari ST, Commodore 64, TurboGrafx-CD, MS-DOS
- Release: August 30, 1987: Arcade; JP: August 30, 1987; EU: August 1987; NA: December 1987; AS: 1987 ZX Spectrum; EU: April 1988 C64; EU: June 1988; NA: September 1988 Amiga, CPC; EU: June 1988 Atari ST; EU: June 1988; NA: Late 1989 TurboGrafx-CD; JP: December 4, 1988; NA: November 1989; EU: 1990 MS-DOS; NA: May 1989
- Genre: Fighting
- Modes: Single-player, multiplayer

Street Fighter (Note: Japanese: ストリートファイター, Hepburn: Sutorīto Faitā) is a 1987 fighting game developed and published by Capcom for arcades. It is the first competitive fighting game produced by the company and the first installment in the Street Fighter series. It was a commercial success in arcades and introduced special attacks and some of the conventions made standard in later fighting games, such as the six-button controls and the use of command-based special moves.

Street Fighter was directed by Takashi Nishiyama, who conceived it by adapting the boss battles of his earlier beat 'em up game Kung-Fu Master (1984), for a one-on-one fighting game, and by drawing influence from popular Japanese shōnen manga. A port for the TurboGrafx-CD was released as Fighting Street (Note: Japanese: ファイティング・ストリート, Hepburn: Faitingu Sutorīto) in 1988, and was re-released via emulation for the Wii's Virtual Console in 2009.

Its sequel, Street Fighter II (1991), evolved its gameplay with phenomenal worldwide success. Street Fighter also spawned two spiritual successors: Capcom's beat 'em up Final Fight (working title Street Fighter '89) and SNK's fighting game Fatal Fury: King of Fighters (1991), the latter designed by Nishiyama.

== Gameplay ==
Ryu (right) versus Retsu (left)

The player competes in one-on-one matches against a series of computer-controlled opponents or in a single match against another player. Each match consists of three rounds in which the player must knock out an opponent in less than 30 seconds. If a match ends before a fighter is knocked out, the fighter with the greater amount of energy left is the round's winner. The player must win two rounds in order to defeat the opponent and proceed to the next battle. If the third round ends in a tie, then the computer-controlled opponent will win by default or both players will lose. During the single-player mode, the losing player can continue against the same opponent. Likewise, a second player can interrupt a single-player match and challenge the first player to a new match.

For the deluxe version of the arcade game, designed by Ken Hata from Atari Games in a joint venture requested personally by Takashi Nishiyama from Capcom, the player's controls consist of a standard eight-way joystick (made by Atari) and two large, unique mechatronic pneumatic pads (also designed by Atari, rubber covered pads housed inside pneumatic pistons made by SMC Pneumatics in California, USA), 1 for punches and 1 for kicks, each returning 3 values (light medium or heavy) depending on how hard the player actuated the control. The pneumatic control design revealed to be complicated to service, its durability being reduced as players often abruptly punched the pads, sometimes injuring themselves, so according to Nishiyama, in fear the players would tire prematurely and not continue to add coins to the "deluxe" arcade cabinet, an alternate "regular" version was released that replaces the two relatively stiffly pressurized pads with an array of six regular snap-action microswitch arcade buttons for the attacks. It consisted in dividing the 3 distinct input levels for speed and strength (light, medium, and heavy) detected for each rubber pad in the deluxe pneumatic version and attributing these values to three punch buttons and three kick buttons for the regular 6-button version (see below for exact "Regular" button layout & naming).

The arcade flyers for Street Fighter advise graphically the players to use a closed fist to bash the pneumatic pads with a "Bang!" noise on the Deluxe upright cabs, but both Capcom officials and editors from gaming magazines in Japan explained the correct method was to avoid using a closed fist striking high above said pads, but instead to favor an open palm hovering directly above the pads, with a controlled and much softer touch to actuate the rubber covered pistons.

The player uses the joystick to move left or right, and to jump, crouch, and block. By using the attack buttons and pads in combination with the joystick, the player can perform a variety of attacks from standing, jumping, or crouching positions. Three special techniques require a specific series of joystick and button inputs:

- Surge Fire (波動拳, Hadōken; "Wave Motion Fist")
  - Quarter-Circle Forward + Punch
- Dragon Punch (昇龍拳, Shoryūken; "Rising Dragon Fist")
  - Forward, Down, Down-Forward + Punch
- Hurricane Kick (竜巻旋風脚, Tatsumaki Senpū Kyaku; "Tornado Whirlwind Leg").
  - Quarter-Circle Back + Kick

This is the first game to use such a concept. Unlike its sequels and other fighting games, the specific commands for these special moves are not given in the arcade game's instruction card; this encourages the player to discover these techniques on their own.

The single-player mode consists of a series of battles against ten opponents from five different nations. At the beginning of the game, the player can choose Japan or the United States, and China or England depending on the game's configuration. The player fights two fighters from the chosen country and proceeds to the next country. Two types of bonus games give additional points: brick breaking and table breaking. After defeating the initial eight characters, the player travels to Thailand for the last two opponents.

== Plot ==
Japanese martial artist Ryu enters the World Fighting Tournament to test his skills against the globe’s strongest warriors. Traveling across five countries-Japan, the United States, China, England, and Thailand, he defeats eight regional fighters, including rogue monks, assassins, and underground bouncers. Ryu’s American rival and friend, Ken Masters enters the tournament to have a match with Ryu, who defeats Ken. Despite losing, Ken wishes Ryu good luck and Ryu moves on to the next match.

After clearing out the bracket and defeating Adon, a Muay Thai fighter, Ryu earns the right to challenge Sagat, the undefeated Muay Thai master and the tournament’s host. During their brutal match, Sagat dominates the fight and pushes Ryu to the brink of defeat. Consumed by a desperate desire to win, Ryu unintentionally taps into the Satsui no Hado (“surge of murderous intent”), a dark murderous energy. Embracing this power, Ryu catches the overconfident Sagat off guard with a devastating Shoryuken (Dragon Punch). The attack tears open Sagat’s chest, leaving him with a massive scar. Ryu wins the tournament but leaves due to being unsettled by the Satsui no Hado. Sagat vowed to go on a lifelong quest for vengeance against the one man who beat him: Ryu.

Sagat ends up saying that Ryu had outlasted the best and that Ryu is the best Street Fighter in the world as a large text appears scrolling down talking about other fighters that will try to knock him from the top at any cost.

== Characters ==
The player takes control of a young Japanese martial artist named Ryu, who participates in the World Fighting Tournament to prove his strength, and the second player takes control of Ryu's former partner and current rival Ken, who also enters the tournament to challenge Ryu in two-player matches. Normally, the player takes control of Ryu in the single-player mode; however, if the player controlling Ken defeats Ryu in a two-player match, the winning player will play the remainder of the game as Ken. The differences between the two characters are aesthetic, with the same basic moves and special techniques.

The first eight computer-controlled opponents are:

from Japan:

- Retsu, an expelled Shorinji Kempo instructor
- Geki, a tekkō kagi–wielding ninja

from the United States:

- Joe, an underground full-contact karate champion
- Mike, a former heavyweight boxer who once killed an opponent in the ring

from China:

- Lee, an expert in Chinese boxing
- Gen, an elderly professional killer who has developed his own assassination art

from Great Britain:

- Birdie, a tall bouncer who uses a combination of wrestling and boxing techniques
- Eagle, a well-dressed bodyguard of a wealthy family who uses Kali sticks

After the first eight challengers are defeated, the player is taken to Thailand for the last two adversaries:

- Adon, a deadly Muay Thai master
- his mentor Sagat, the reputed "Emperor of Muay Thai" and the game's final opponent

== Development ==
Takashi Nishiyama conceived Street Fighter after working on Irem's 1984 beat 'em up game Kung-Fu Master (called Spartan X in Japan), which has a number of boss fights; Nishiyama considered making a game centered around them. In turn, the boss fights were inspired by the Bruce Lee's martial arts film Game of Death (1972). Following the success of Kung-Fu Master, Nishiyama was hired by Capcom. He designed an arcade successor for Capcom, Trojan (1986), a brawler which evolved the basic gameplay concepts of Kung-Fu Master; the NES port has a one-on-one fighting mode, for the first time in a Capcom game. Nishiyama later designed Street Fighter. The game was also influenced by the earlier fighting games from 1984 – Karate Champ and Yie Ar Kung-Fu. The gameplay of Karate Champ, Kung-Fu Master and Yie Ar Kung Fu provided a basic template for Street Fighter. Nishiyama wanted the game to have a story similar to a film.

Street Fighter was produced and directed by Takashi Nishiyama (who is credited as "Piston Takashi") and planned by Hiroshi Matsumoto (credited as "Finish Hiroshi"), who both previously worked on the overhead beat 'em up Avengers (1987). They would leave Capcom after the production of the game and were employed by SNK, developing most of their fighting game series, including Fatal Fury and Art of Fighting. They would later work for Dimps and work on Street Fighter IV with Capcom. Keiji Inafune, best known for his artwork in Capcom's Mega Man franchise, got his start at the company by designing and illustrating the character portraits in Street Fighter. Nishiyama drew several inspirations for developing the original gameplay of Street Fighter from martial art styles he was practicing, and Inafune based several character designs on the manga Karate Baka Ichidai.

The designers at Capcom took inspiration from Robert Clouse's 1973 Enter the Dragon, also co-starred by Bruce Lee. That and Street Fighter are similarly centered around an international fighting tournament, with each character having a unique combination of ethnicity, nationality, and fighting style. Nishiyama was also inspired by popular Japanese shōnen manga and anime, including an energy attack called Hadouho (lit. the "Wave Motion Gun") from the 1970s anime series Space Battleship Yamato as the origin of the Hadouken move. The game's title was taken from Sonny Chiba's film The Street Fighter (1974).

== Release ==
=== Arcade variants ===
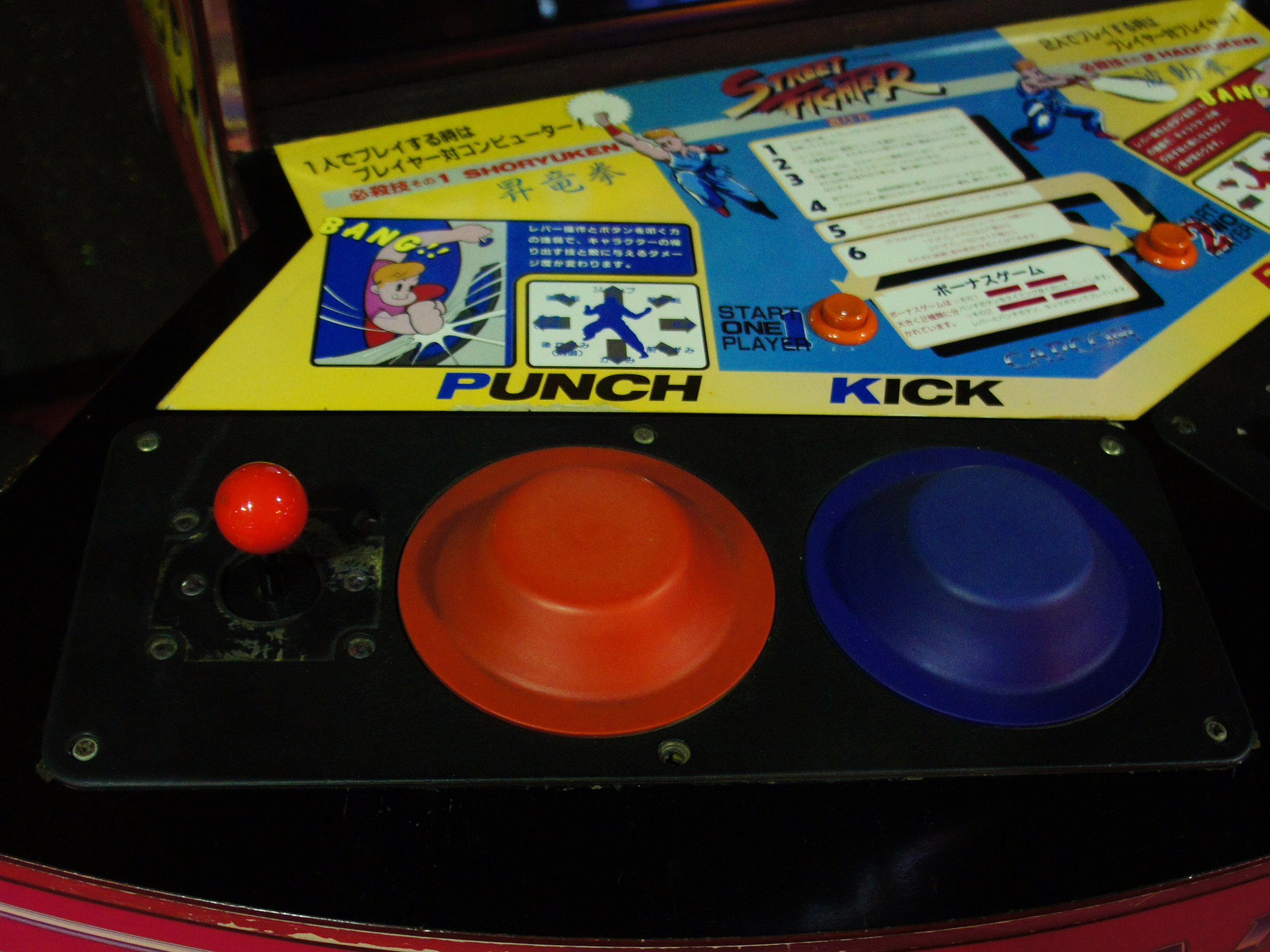
The pressure-sensitive pneumatic control system used for the deluxe cabinet

Two different arcade cabinets types were sold for the game: the "regular" version (which was sold as a 26" monitor cocktail cabinet in Japan and as an upright overseas) with a partially similar (see below for differences) six-button configuration similar to the one used later in Street Fighter II, and the deluxe cabinet with two pressure-sensitive pneumatic rubber pads that determine the strength and speed of attacks.

The "regular" Street Fighter cabinets for both Japanese and overseas versions had their six-button layout arranged in decreasing "strength" order, with strong, medium then light inputs ranging from left to right on the layout (both for punches and kicks), rather than in increasing order as with Street Fighter II. In the official arcade flyers for Street Fighter, punch inputs were named from left to right, "fierce, hook, jab", and kicks (in the same order) "fierce, low, block". For Street Fighter II cabinets, the flyers show from left to right "light, middle, heavy" button layout for punches and kicks, soon to be set in stone as an industry standard for Capcom's 2D fighting games.

In Japan, in terms of commercial success, the "deluxe" pneumatic control cabinet version ranked number three in the upright and cockpit list of arcades in October 1987, while the "regular" six-button cheaper cocktail version managed to peak at first place on the table arcade chart; however, all versions dropped suddenly out of favor from their respective charts as soon as mid-1988. In the US, surveys related to both deluxe and regular upright types showed that the decline was more progressive, ranging from number 10 in the charts (December 1987) to falling out of the top 25 in mid-1989.

In the worldwide versions, Ryu's and Ken's voices were dubbed so that they yell the names of their moves in English, such as Psycho Fire, Dragon Punch, and Hurricane Kick. Subsequent localized releases until Street Fighter IV left the Japanese voices intact; since Street Fighter IV, the series contains English voice acting, and Asian characters use Japanese names for certain special moves and super combos among otherwise English dialogue.

The hardware built inside the arcade cabinets consists of a custom arcade system board that is based on a Motorola 68000 CPU clocked at 8 MHz with two Zilog Z80 sound coprocessors clocked at 3.579 MHz. Sound is provided by the Yamaha YM2151 FM sound chip and two Oki MSM5205 ADPCM sound chips and outputs stereo sound. The display resolution is 384×224 at 60 Hz. The "deluxe" pneumatic cabinet has a specific PCB with sensors plugged to their respective rubber tubings and thus a specific ROM set as well.

=== Home versions ===
Street Fighter was ported as Fighting Street in 1988 for the PC Engine CD-ROM^{2} System in Japan and 1989 for the TurboGrafx-CD in North America. There was no six-button controller for the TurboGrafx-CD at the time, so the attack strength is determined by the duration of the button-press, akin to the deluxe arcade version. It has a remastered soundtrack and covers artwork of Mount Rushmore, an in-game location. It was developed by Alfa System and published by NEC Avenue in North America and Hudson Soft in Japan. This version was re-released via emulation for the Wii's Virtual Console on October 6, 2009, in Japan, November 2, 2009, in North America and November 6, 2009, in PAL regions.

Versions for the Commodore 64, ZX Spectrum, Amstrad CPC, Amiga, and Atari ST were developed by Tiertex and published by U.S. Gold in 1988 in Europe. A different Commodore 64 version was developed by Pacific Dataworks and published by Capcom USA. Capcom also published an MS-DOS version in 1989, developed by Hi Tech Expressions. Hi-Tech re-released the game as part of the Street Fighter Series CD-ROM collection.

An emulated arcade version is included in Capcom Arcade Hits Volume 1 for Windows, Capcom Classics Collection Remixed for the PlayStation Portable, Capcom Classics Collection Volume 2 for the PlayStation 2 and Xbox, and Street Fighter 30th Anniversary Collection for PlayStation 4, Xbox One, Nintendo Switch, and Windows.

== Reception ==
Reception

Review scores
Publication	Score
Computer and Video Games	Positive (Arcade); 89% (PC Engine); 2/10 (Amiga & Atari ST)
Génération 4	83% (Amiga & Atari ST)
Joystick	79% (PC Engine)
PC Engine Fan	24.4/30 (PC Engine)
Sinclair User	10/10 (ZX Spectrum)
Your Sinclair	8/10 (ZX Spectrum)
Zzap!64	36% (Commodore 64)
Commodore User	6/10 (Arcade)

Award
Publication	Award
Sinclair User	SU Classic

=== Arcade ===
The original punching-pad cabinet was not successful as Capcom had planned, with only around 1,000 units sold. However, the alternate six-button version was more successful, selling in the tens of thousands, with estimates ranging from between 10,000 and 50,000 units sold. In Japan, Game Machine listed Street Fighter as the fifth most successful upright arcade unit of September 1987, before reaching number three in October 1987 and then number one in January 1988. It became Japan's fifth highest-grossing large arcade game of 1987, and the country's eighth highest-grossing arcade game of 1988. In the United Kingdom, the Coinslot charts of Sinclair User magazine listed Street Fighter as the top-grossing dedicated arcade game of August 1988. It was not as successful in the United States, where it peaked at number 10 on the RePlay upright cabinet chart in December 1987.

The arcade game received positive to mixed reviews, with critics praising the combat and graphics but criticizing the pressure-pad controls. Upon release in August 1987, Commodore User magazine said it has some of the "most unusual features which make it worthy of note" such as the experimental rubber pad controls and the large 24-inch screen displaying large detailed sprite graphics. However, the review said "the fairly repetitive nature of the game, and the large amount of physical effort needed to play it, will prevent Street Fighter from being much more than a novel experiment in coin-op technology" but that only "time will tell". In September, Tony Thompson of Crash said it "breathes new life" into martial arts games, with a "huge" cabinet, "big" characters, pads where "the harder you hit the pads the harder your character hits" and "secret techniques" but criticized it for making his "hands hurt". In December 1987, Julian Rignall and Daniel Gilbert of Crash said "it adds a new dimension with pneumatic punch buttons" and the action is "gratifying" with "great feedback from the buttons" but "there's very little to draw you back" after the novelty wears off.

Clare Edgeley of Computer and Video Games said in December 1987 that the arcade game had "huge" sprites, "among the most realistic" characters, and "intense" action, but requires mastering the controls, including punches, kicks, stoop kicks, flip kicks, and backward flips. She said "the competition is intense" and the deluxe version "is much more fun". Computer and Video Games said in May 1988 that the arcade game was "one of the most realistic martial arts combat games, a sort of street Olympics" with international opponents.

=== Ports ===
The ZX Spectrum version received positive reviews. While reviewing the Spectrum version, Sinclair User awarded the game a maximum rating and called it "one of the games of the year".

The Amiga and Atari ST versions received mixed reviews. Génération 4 gave them a positive review. Julian Rignall of Computer and Video Games reviewed the Amiga and Atari ST versions, stating that the game had "no lasting appeal whatsoever".

== Legacy ==
Street Fighter's niche evolved, partly because many arcade game developers in the 1980s focused more on producing beat 'em up and shoot 'em up games. Part of the appeal was the use of special moves that can only be discovered by experimenting with controls, which created a sense of mystique and invited players to practice the game. Following Street Fighter's lead, the use of command-based hidden moves began to pervade other games in the rising fighting game genre. Street Fighter introduced other staples of the genre, including the blocking technique and the ability for a challenger to spontaneously initiate a match against a player. The game introduced pressure-sensitive controls that determine the strength of an attack. However, due to this encouraging damage, Capcom soon replaced it with a six-button control scheme offering light, medium, and hard punches and kicks, which became another staple of the genre. Yoshinori Ono considers Street Fighter to be "the first modern-day fighting game".

Capcom's brawler Final Fight (1989) began development as a sequel called Street Fighter '89. According to the developers, they were originally planning to have Ryu and Ken as the main protagonists, but changed to a new plot and setting. SNK's fighting game Fatal Fury: King of Fighters (1991) was designed by Takashi Nishiyama, the director of Street Fighter. Nishiyama envisioned Fatal Fury as a spiritual successor to Street Fighter, developed around the same time as Street Fighter II (1991). Street Fighter II focuses on combos, and Fatal Fury focuses on special move timing and storytelling. Street Fighter also influenced Sega AM1's Makoto Uchida as lead designer of hack and slash beat 'em up Golden Axe (1989), particularly with combo moves.
