= Marvel vs. Capcom: Infinite =

2017 video game

- Developer: Capcom
- Publisher: Capcom
- Director: Norio Hirose
- Producers: Mike Evans; Tsukasa Takenaka
- Designer: Tsuyoshi Nagayama
- Programmer: Takashi Nishimura
- Writer: Paul Gardner
- Composer: Eishi Segawa
- Series: Marvel vs. Capcom
- Engine: Unreal Engine 4
- Platforms: PlayStation 4; Windows; Xbox One
- Release: WW: September 19, 2017; JP: September 21, 2017
- Genre: Fighting
- Modes: Single-player, multiplayer

Marvel vs. Capcom: Infinite (Note: Japanese: マーベル VS. カプコン：インフィニット, Hepburn: Māberu VS. Kapukon: Infinitto) is a 2017 crossover fighting game developed and published by Capcom. It is the sixth main entry in the Marvel vs. Capcom series and the successor to Ultimate Marvel vs. Capcom 3 (2011). Like previous installments, players control characters from both the Marvel Comics and Capcom universes to compete in tag team battles. Infinite features two-on-two fights, as opposed to the three-on-three format used in its preceding titles. The series' character-assist moves have been removed; instead, the game incorporates a tag-based combo system, which allows players to instantly switch between their two characters to form continuous combos. It also introduces a new gameplay mechanic in the form of the Infinity Stones, which temporarily bestow players with unique abilities and stat boosts depending on the type of stone selected.

Infinite was announced during Sony's PlayStation Experience event in December 2016. Capcom initially lost the use of the Marvel license in 2012, after The Walt Disney Company decided to focus on self-publishing its own gaming titles; however, Capcom was able to reacquire the license after Disney dissolved its console publishing division. Infinite was designed to be more accessible than previous Marvel vs. Capcom games, resulting in several changes to the series' traditional mechanics. The game also features a larger emphasis on storytelling with the series' first cinematic story mode. The plot follows the heroes of the Marvel and Capcom universes, who must work together to save their merged worlds against a new threat, Ultron Sigma.

Infinite was released in September 2017 for PlayStation 4, Windows, and Xbox One. The game received average to positive reviews; critics praised its new gameplay elements, but criticized its presentation (particularly its art direction) and character roster. The game also underperformed commercially. Capcom originally expected the game to sell two million units; however, it missed its sales target, selling approximately one million copies by the end of December 2017.

== Gameplay ==
A gameplay screenshot of Thor battling Chun-Li, illustrating the change to two-on-two battles and the inclusion of the Infinity Stones

Like its predecessors, Marvel vs. Capcom: Infinite is a 2D fighting game in which players compete against each other in tag team combat using characters from both the Marvel Comics and Capcom universes. Players must knock out the opposing team by repeatedly attacking the opponent and draining their health bar. Infinite features two-on-two partner battles, similar to Marvel vs. Capcom: Clash of Super Heroes and earlier installments in the franchise. Unlike past entries, the game does not allow players to use traditional call-in assist attacks from off-screen characters; instead, Infinite utilizes a "free-form" tag system, known as "Active Switch", which shares similarities with Marvel vs. Capcom 3's "Team Aerial Combo" system and Street Fighter X Tekken's "Switch Cancel" system. Players can immediately switch between their team members at any point, even while mid-air or during attack animations. This provides players with the abilities to create their own offensive or defensive assists through the tag system and form continuous combos between their two characters.

As with previous Marvel vs. Capcom titles, players will charge their "Hyper Combo Gauge" as their characters deal or receive damage during the fight. Players can then expend the accrued meter from their Hyper Combo Gauge to perform "Hyper Combos", cinematic attacks which deal larger amounts of damage to the opponent. Alternatively, players can sacrifice meter from their Hyper Combo Gauge to perform the newly introduced "Counter Switch" mechanic, which tags in their partner character while the opponent is attacking them. This provides players with the opportunity to counterattack and free the character trapped in the enemy's combo. The Hyper Combo Gauge in Infinite is limited to four bars of meter, as opposed to the five-bar maximum used in Marvel vs. Capcom 2 and 3.

Infinite moves away from the button layout previously used in Marvel vs. Capcom 3, and instead employs a control scheme more similar to Marvel vs. Capcom 2, which includes four attack buttons, consisting of two pairs of light and heavy punches and kicks, and two additional buttons used for swapping characters and activating Infinity Stone powers. To improve accessibility, the game includes an "auto-combo" system which allows players to repeatedly press the light punch button to automatically perform both ground and air combos. In addition, certain Hyper Combos can now be activated by simply pressing the two heavy attack buttons, as opposed to the specific joystick and button combinations required in previous titles.

Infinite also implements the Infinity Stones as a gameplay mechanic, similar to Marvel Super Heroes, where each stone grants unique abilities. Before the match begins, players select one of the six Infinity Stones. Each Infinity Stone bestows one ability that can be activated at any time, known as the "Infinity Surge". For example, the Power Stone produces a knockback effect when used, while the Space Stone pulls an opponent closer to the player character. A second, stronger ability called the "Infinity Storm" can be activated after players fill their Infinity meter at least halfway, giving them a significant boost for a limited time, similar to the X-Factor system from Marvel vs. Capcom 3. The boost is determined by the chosen Infinity Stone; for example, the Power Stone increases the user's damage output and combo ability, while the Space Stone traps an opponent within a confined area that severely limits their movement.

The game offers various offline and online single-player and multiplayer game modes. The offline features include Story Mode, a two-hour cinematic story campaign; Arcade Mode, a classic arcade game experience where players fight against several AI-controlled opponents before confronting the final boss characters Ultron Sigma and Ultron Omega; Mission Mode, where players can complete tutorial missions and character-specific challenges; Training Mode, where players can practice their fighting abilities and adjust various training field parameters; Versus Player 2, where two players can battle against each other locally; Versus CPU, where players can battle solo against an AI-controlled opponent; and Collection Mode, where extras unlocked through gameplay are stored, including story cutscenes, character and stage information, concept artwork, and audio tracks. Online multiplayer includes ranked and casual matches, global leaderboards, replays, and eight-player lobbies with spectating. The online mode also introduces the Beginners League, a special league designated for low-ranking players to compete for graduation into higher ranks.

=== Playable characters ===
Marvel vs. Capcom: Infinite features a base roster of 30 playable characters, consisting of both new and returning heroes and villains in the Marvel vs. Capcom series. Six additional characters were also released post-launch as downloadable content (DLC).

New characters to the franchise are listed below in bold.

==== Marvel characters ====
- **Black Panther** (Note: Available as downloadable content.)
- **Black Widow**
- Captain America
- **Captain Marvel**
- Doctor Strange
- Dormammu
- **Gamora**
- Ghost Rider
- Hawkeye
- Hulk
- Iron Man
- Nova
- Rocket Raccoon
- Spider-Man
- Thanos
- Thor Odinson
- **Ultron**
- Venom
- **Winter Soldier**

==== Capcom characters ====
- Arthur
- Chris Redfield
- Chun-Li
- Dante
- Firebrand
- Frank West
- **Jedah Dohma**
- Mike Haggar
- **Monster Hunter**
- Morrigan Aensland
- Nathan "Rad" Spencer
- Nemesis T-Type
- Ryu
- **Sigma**
- Strider Hiryu
- **X**
- Zero

== Plot ==
Death is visited by Jedah Dohma, who proposes an alliance to achieve equilibrium between life and death on both their worlds. Needing the six Infinity Stones to do so, Death deceives Thanos and Ultron into aiding her, granting Thanos the Space Stone and sending Ultron to retrieve the Reality Stone from Abel City. Sigma intercepts Ultron, and the two forge their own alliance. They betray the others and use the Space and Reality Stones to merge the two dimensions and fuse themselves into a single being named "Ultron Sigma". To wipe out biological life, they begin unleashing an evolved form of the Sigma Virus that turns organic creatures into synthetic beings under their control. An alliance of heroes from both worlds is then formed. They manage to keep Ultron Sigma at a stalemate until they rescue Thanos from Ultron Sigma's prison and secure him in a containment field at Avengers Tower. To gain their trust, Thanos reveals the locations of the remaining four Infinity Stones, and teams of heroes are dispatched to find them.

Ryu, Chun-Li, Captain America, and Hulk travel to Valkanda to obtain the Time Stone. Despite Captain America's warnings, Black Panther, the ruler of Valkanda, refuses to surrender it. Ultron Sigma's drones arrive and spread the virus, infecting a Dah'ren Mohran. After Ryu and Hulk defeat the creature, Black Panther agrees to give them the Stone. Next, Dante, Morrigan, Ghost Rider, Arthur, and Doctor Strange travel to the Dark Kingdom, where they encounter Jedah, who is using the Soul Stone to feed souls to a Symbiote creature, hoping to use it against Ultron Sigma. While the heroes battle Dormammu and Firebrand, Jedah escapes with the Stone. Meanwhile, Iron Man sends Spider-Man to assist Chris Redfield in infiltrating an A.I.M.brella facility. There, they find Frank West and Mike Haggar, and discover MODOK turning people into bio-organic weapons, infused with Symbiotes at Jedah's demand. The heroes defeat MODOK's enforcer, Nemesis, and retrieve the Mind Stone. However, they are soon attacked by Jedah and his giant Symbiote. On Knowmoon, Captain Marvel, Rocket Raccoon, Gamora, Nova, Strider Hiryu, and X defeat Ultron Sigma's ally, Grandmaster Meio, and rescue Zero from his control. Upon taking the Power Stone, the station ejects its core, which falls towards New Metro City carrying a massive Sigma Virus payload.

While Doctor Light, Iron Man, Nathan Spencer, and Hawkeye build a weapon to harness the Infinity Stones, Ultron Sigma attacks Avengers Tower. In the chaos, Thanos is released and attacks Ultron Sigma, cracking the Reality Stone and forcing them to retreat. The heroes use their Stones to destroy the Symbiote and the falling core, but are infected in the process. The infected heroes then head for Xgard to infiltrate Sigma's laboratory to finish their weapon, the Infinity Buster. When Thanos learns of Death and Jedah's partnership, he becomes enraged and betrays the heroes, creating a mechanized gauntlet that absorbs Ryu's Satsui no Hadō before departing for revenge. After reclaiming the Soul Stone from Jedah, Dante arrives in Xgard and pretends to surrender the Stone. Since they have no souls, Ultron Sigma is overwhelmed by the Stone and transforms into Ultron Omega. The Infinity Buster is installed into X, who uses it to destroy Ultron Omega.

In the aftermath, the virus is neutralized, but since the Reality Stone was cracked, the universes cannot be separated again. The heroes agree to protect the new world and split the Infinity Stones between them to keep them safe. In a post-credits scene, Jedah tells Death that he has another plan, but Thanos arrives seeking vengeance against them. Believing the Satsui no Hadō is capable of killing immortals like Death and Jedah, he prepares to attack them with a Gohadouken.

== Development ==
Following the release of Ultimate Marvel vs. Capcom 3 for the PlayStation Vita in 2012, Marvel's new parent company, The Walt Disney Company, which acquired Marvel in 2009, chose not to renew their licensing deal with Capcom, instead opting to move its viable properties towards their self-published game titles, such as Disney Infinity; this resulted in Ultimate Marvel vs. Capcom 3, Marvel vs. Capcom 2 and Marvel vs. Capcom Origins being delisted from the Xbox Live Arcade and PlayStation Network in 2013.

However, in May 2016, Disney announced its decision to discontinue self-publishing efforts and switch over to a licensing-only model, allowing third-party game developers, including Capcom, to negotiate licenses with Marvel once again. The same year on December 3, Marvel vs. Capcom: Infinite was officially unveiled during Sony's PlayStation Experience event; its first gameplay footage debuted on the same day following the conclusion of Capcom Cup 2016. Norio Hirose, a programmer who had previously worked on X-Men vs. Street Fighter, Marvel Super Heroes vs. Street Fighter, and Marvel vs. Capcom: Clash of Super Heroes, as well as other Capcom fighting games, such as Project Justice and Capcom vs. SNK: Millennium Fight 2000, served as Infinite's director.

Game development involved Capcom Japan, Capcom USA, and Marvel Games. According to Mike Jones, Executive Producer at Marvel Games, Infinite was designed to be a "more elegant and simplified" game which remained as "complex and hardcore" as past Marvel vs. Capcom installments. While the developers sought to keep the core elements of the series intact, such as air combos, they also wanted Infinite to push away from its predecessors, resulting in several changes to the series' traditional formula. The decision to change the three-on-three battle system used in Marvel vs. Capcom 2 and 3 was considered for a long time before ultimately settling on two-on-two fights for the sake of accessibility. Producer Mike Evans hoped that introducing a more manageable two-character system would give casual Marvel vs. Capcom fans the ability to play the game without becoming overwhelmed.

To offset the streamlined character select system and removal of call-in assist attacks, the six Infinity Stones were implemented to provide teams with additional customization options and increase gameplay depth. Marvel and Capcom compared the Infinity Stones to the "Groove System" used in Capcom vs. SNK 2. The primary goal with the Infinity Stones was to create a level playing field by acting as a comeback enabler, and allowing players to compensate for their characters' deficiencies and enhance their strong points. According to developers, the inclusion of the Infinity Stones and the theme of "infinite [gameplay] possibilities" influenced their decision to use Marvel vs. Capcom: Infinite as the game's title, rather than Marvel vs. Capcom 4. To further differentiate Infinite, the developers opted to use the Unreal Engine 4 to develop more cinematic and modern visuals, as opposed to the stylized art direction used in Marvel vs. Capcom 3.

The budget provided for the development of Infinite was reportedly little more than half the amount used to develop DLC content for Street Fighter V; as a result, developers re-used assets from older games, including Marvel vs. Capcom 3, to save time and money.

According to Producer Evans and Associate Producer Peter Rosas, the development team examined the strengths and weaknesses of each returning character and adjusted them by providing new moves and abilities, hoping to make every fighter viable. In terms of roster selection, characters were chosen based on two aspects: their potential interactions within the story and their gameplay style. The developers sought to include a variety of different character archetypes, from small, nimble characters, such as Strider Hiryu, to large, brawler-type characters, such as the Hulk. The Marvel characters' designs were proposed by Capcom's research and development team in Japan, who took inspiration from both the characters' comic book and film appearances. Marvel staff members worked closely with the team, providing feedback to maintain the authenticity of their characters' portrayals. While speaking at E3 2017, Evans explained how they picked the roster based on which characters Marvel was currently pushing or planning to push in the future.

Beyond appealing to genre and series fans, Capcom sought to target a diverse audience with Infinite and bring in casual players who were fans of Marvel's movies, comic books, and television shows. To this end, the developers wanted to introduce a more robust, cinematic story compared to previous Marvel vs. Capcom titles. Bill Rosemann, Creative Director at Marvel Games, stated that Infinite's increased emphasis on storytelling was influenced by Marvel's story and character-centric approach to their recent projects in games, film, and television; Rosemann and Jones cited Insomniac Games' Spider-Man video game and Telltale Games' Guardians of the Galaxy title as examples. While speaking at the 2017 D.I.C.E. Summit, Rosemann also explained that Marvel Games would not force its development partners to tie their games into existing storylines throughout Marvel's universes, giving them more freedom to craft their own original stories and create new visions for their characters. Infinite's story mode script was penned by writer Paul Gardner, with oversight from Rosemann and Marvel's gaming division. Gardner first became involved with the project beginning in 2015 and finished writing the script in 2016. Marvel provided feedback to Capcom on the revisions, animations, music, and presentation of the overall story mode experience. Frank Tieri, the lead writer for Marvel vs. Capcom 3, has also confirmed his involvement with Infinite.

According to developers, Capcom's struggle with the launch of Street Fighter V influenced several decisions during Infinite's development. The heavy criticism towards Street Fighter V's lack of content prompted Capcom to promise a larger variety of single-player and multiplayer content for Infinite upon release. As a result of Street Fighter V's initial online multiplayer server issues, the developers plan to forgo their own servers in favor of dedicated servers by Sony and Microsoft, aiming to provide more stable online play for Infinite. The game does not feature cross-platform play, with Evans citing Capcom's trouble with implementing the Capcom Fighters Network cross-platform structure into Street Fighter V. Infinite also does not include any currency systems similar to Street Fighter V's "Fight Money".

== Release ==
Marvel vs. Capcom: Infinite was released for the PlayStation 4, Windows, and Xbox One, on September 19, 2017, in North America and Europe, and September 21 in Japan. The game was available in three editions: a standard edition, a Deluxe Edition, and a Collector's Edition. Pre-orders for the standard edition include the Evil Ryu and Warrior Thor alternate in-game costumes. Pre-orders for the Deluxe Edition include the Evil Ryu, Warrior Thor, Gladiator Hulk and Command Mission X alternate costumes, in addition to the "2017 Character Pass". The Collector's Edition, which includes the Deluxe Edition and its pre-order incentives, features four character dioramas of Iron Man, Captain Marvel, Mega Man X and Chun-Li by TriForce, and a case filled with six LED-powered Infinity Stone replicas. The Major Carol Danvers alternate costume was also packaged exclusively with the PlayStation 4 version. A story mode demo was released on June 12, 2017, following Sony's press conference at the Electronic Entertainment Expo. In February 2018, Infinite was listed on the Microsoft Store as an Xbox Play Anywhere title.

To coincide with the game's release, Capcom announced their first global tournament series for Infinite called Battle for the Stones. In addition to extending special invitations to the Evolution Championship Series' seven Marvel vs. Capcom 3 champions, Capcom selected six community events to act as "Infinity Stone Tournaments". The winner of each event, in addition to qualifying for the Battle for the Stones finals, received an Infinity Stone that could be used to gain a unique advantage during the competition. For example, the Space Stone allowed its bearer to swap their position within the tournament bracket to face a different opponent, while the Mind Stone allowed its bearer to pick their opponent's team. Fellow competitors could steal Infinity Stones by successfully defeating their current owners. Capcom also held three regional online tournaments to fill out the remaining bracket spots. The finals were held in Anaheim, California on December 9–10, 2017, and included a US$30,000 prize pool. The winner of the tournament was Jonathan "Cloud805" Morales, who received US$20,000 and an Infinity Gauntlet trophy.

=== Downloadable content ===
The "2017 Character Pass" includes six DLC fighters: Black Panther, Black Widow, Monster Hunter, Sigma, Venom, and Winter Soldier. Black Panther, Monster Hunter, and Sigma were released on October 17, 2017, while Black Widow, Venom, and Winter Soldier were released on December 5. Players could also obtain the Superior Spider-Man alternate costume by pre-ordering Spider-Man: Homecoming through the PlayStation 4 and Xbox One online stores before October 24, 2017. On October 17, Capcom released three themed costume packs, each containing six outfits: the Avenging Army Pack (Iron Man, Hawkeye, Thor, Dante, Spencer, Arthur), the World Warriors Pack (Captain America, Captain Marvel, Hulk, Chris, Ryu, Chun-Li), and the Mystic Masters Pack (Doctor Strange, Dormammu, Ghost Rider, Morrigan, Firebrand, Nemesis). The costumes can also be purchased individually or altogether with the "Premium Costume Pass". The Premium Costume Pass gives players additional access to the Stone Seekers Pack (Spider-Man, Ultron, Thanos, Jedah, Frank, Haggar) and the Cosmic Crusaders Pack (Rocket Raccoon, Gamora, Nova, Strider Hiryu, X, Zero), which were released on December 5.

=== Related media ===
In February 2017, Hasbro announced a Marvel vs. Capcom: Infinite toy line during their presentation at the American International Toy Fair. Later in May, Marvel announced a series of Marvel vs. Capcom-themed comic book variant covers, which became available in comic stores throughout August. Marvel also published a GameStop-exclusive comic book based on the game. In September, Marvel revealed a new wave of Funko Pop! collectibles, featuring the playable cast from Infinite in their premium alternate costumes. The collectibles were released in November 2017.

== Reception ==
=== Pre-release ===
In pre-release coverage, Infinite's departure from some of the series' long-standing gameplay mechanics, namely three-on-three battles and character assist moves, for the sake of accessibility was met with mixed reception. Suriel Vazquez of Game Informer and Wesley Yin-Poole of Eurogamer stated that Infinite could end up being a divisive game, especially to the hardcore audience, since both mechanics had defined the Marvel vs. Capcom series for nearly two decades. The issue was mirrored by IGN's Daniel Krupa, who mentioned that the shifts in the series' formula could lead to a feeling among fans that their game was being "diluted" for newer players. Vazquez and Krupa, however, appreciated the changes, with Vazquez saying that he preferred the series "go for broke", rather than play it safe. GamesRadar's David Houghton and Kotaku's Ian Walker gave positive remarks in their impressions of the press preview build, with both praising the development team's attempt to create an accessible environment for newcomers while also pleasing the competitive community.

Early criticism was directed at Infinite's less stylized art direction. Alex Donaldson of VG247 stated that "the art style just feels off — or at worst, unfinished...as it stands right now the art style is a mistake when compared to Marvel vs. Capcom 3". Sergio Figueroa of Gamereactor and Nick Valdez of Destructoid also expressed disappointment with the visuals, particularly the in-game character models and the HUD. Figueroa wrote that "the developers have chosen a simplistic and, in our opinion, insufficiently detailed character design that we think diminishes the fighters' personalities". The release of the story mode demo was also criticized. Polygon's David Cabrera felt the demo was a "squandered opportunity" by Capcom that "actively [hid] the good points of the game and [highlighted] its failings", such as unpolished character models and awkward voice acting, while Game Informer's Ben Reeves thought the demo lacked entertaining moments and failed to showcase Marvel and Capcom's "dream matchups" in any meaningful or creative way. Following complaints about the quality of certain character models, particularly on the Capcom side of the roster, the developers announced plans for a day-one patch that would focus on artistic improvements.

=== Post-release ===
Reception

Aggregate score
Aggregator	Score
Metacritic	PC: 69/100; PS4: 72/100; XONE: 77/100

Review scores
Publication	Score
Destructoid	7.5/10
Game Informer	8.25/10
GameSpot	8/10
GamesRadar+	3/5
IGN	7.7/10
Polygon	7.7/10
VentureBeat	75/100

Marvel vs. Capcom: Infinite was released to average to positive reviews, according to Metacritic, which provided aggregated scores of 77, 72, and 69 for the Xbox One, PlayStation 4, and Windows versions, respectively.

The game received praise for its gameplay, including its changes to the series' traditional tag team system and the addition of the Infinity Stones. GameSpot's Tamoor Hussain complimented the developers for simplifying tagging without sacrificing gameplay depth. He appreciated the game's more open-ended fighting systems, comparing Infinite to "a blank canvas" and its mechanics "as the brushes for painting your unique superhero squad". Polygon's Chelsea Stark and Jeff Ramos also praised the revised core mechanics, saying that the new tag system opened more options for clever combo creation. Similarly, IGN's Darry Huskey was impressed by the game's willingness to "completely [upend] traditions fans have known since X-Men vs. Street Fighter in 1996" by overhauling time-honored game mechanics, such as the assist system. Additionally, Huskey described the decision to replace each team's third character with an Infinity Stone as the "crown jewel" of Infinite's design, claiming that it "works so well, it makes the very idea of a three-character team now seem like old news". Game Informer's Ben Reeves wrote that the streamlined fighting system and the inclusions of automatic combos and simplified super attacks would allow newcomers "to feel right at home".

Reviewers criticized the game for its presentation. Huskey labeled the character design as "distractingly bad and stiff", and found the orchestral soundtrack to be "forgettable and easily ignored". Stark and Ramos proclaimed that the aesthetics were "the stalest the franchise has ever seen", and compared the user interface to "placeholder graphics that were never changed for the final product". Destructoid's Chris Carter also criticized the visuals, describing the art style as "a crime against humanity". GamesRadar's Sam Prell felt that Infinite's presentation, in comparison to "the flashy cel-shaded art direction and over-the-top tone of Marvel vs. Capcom 3" and "the silky smooth sprites and technical precision of Marvel vs. Capcom 2", made the game fall "hopelessly short...in the shadow of its own pedigree". Eurogamer's Wesley Yin-Poole loathed the art style, calling it a "desperate attempt to appeal to fans of Marvel's all-encompassing cinematic universe" and "an abomination of a look that neither appeals to movie nor comic book fans".

Infinite was also criticized for its playable roster, which was smaller than the previous installment, Ultimate Marvel vs. Capcom 3, and recycled many of its characters. VentureBeat's Mike Minotti expressed his disappointment with the game's smaller selection of fighters, especially compared to its predecessors, and the meager amount of newcomers. Yin-Poole noted the lack of diversity in the roster, particularly the lack of playable female characters. The omission of characters from the X-Men and Fantastic Four franchises was also chastised by critics, who speculated that the then-ongoing legal dispute between The Walt Disney Company, Marvel Studios, and 20th Century Fox over their film rights was the main motive behind their exclusion. Prell and Yin-Poole both lambasted the lack of X-Men characters, pointing out the franchise's significance in establishing the Marvel vs. Capcom series with X-Men vs. Street Fighter. The latter declared their omission as "a dagger in the heart of every [Marvel vs. Capcom] fan - one that there is no recovering from".

The game was nominated for "Best Fighting Game of E3 2017" by the Game Critics Awards, but lost to Dragon Ball FighterZ, another game with similar gameplay to the Marvel vs. Capcom series, in which Infinite was negatively compared to and overshadowed by. It also received "Best Fighting Game of 2017" nominations by IGN, The Game Awards, and the 21st Annual D.I.C.E. Awards, but lost to Injustice 2. In addition, it received nominations for "Control Precision" and "Game, Franchise Fighting" at the 17th Annual National Academy of Video Game Trade Reviewers Awards, but lost to Cuphead and Tekken 7, respectively.

=== Sales ===
According to their sales plans for the fiscal year ending on March 31, 2018, Capcom expected Marvel vs. Capcom: Infinite to sell two million units worldwide. The game saw poor first-week sales in the United Kingdom, debuting at #12 on the all-formats chart. The PlayStation 4 version peaked at #16 in the individual formats chart, while the Xbox One version failed to reach the Top 40. In Japan, the PlayStation 4 version ranked #8 on the Media Create sales chart after its first week, selling 8,273 copies; the Xbox One version did not make it into the Top 20. This marked a significant drop from the 80,966 units Marvel vs. Capcom 3: Fate of Two Worlds had sold in a similar time period. The game reached #6 in Australia and #7 in New Zealand for its first week. It ranked #6 in the United States' list of top-selling games for September 2017, and #19 in the US PlayStation Store's September download charts. In its first half report of the fiscal year ending on March 31, 2018, Capcom reported that over 900,000 units had been shipped in the period ending September 30, 2017. In its third quarter report of the fiscal year ending on March 31, 2018, Capcom disclosed that Infinite had sold one million units as of December 31, 2017, missing its initial sales target. In their 2018 integrated report, Capcom described sales for Infinite as weak, stating "Marvel vs. Capcom: Infinite delivered a certain level of sales, primarily overseas owing to deep-rooted popularity, but underperformed overall". As of March of 2025, the game has sold 2.4 million copies in overall sales.

== Legacy ==
In May 2024, prominent fighting game community member and content creator Maximilian Dood, alongside artist and video game modder Ryn/WistfulHopes, spearheaded the development of a mod to overhaul the game's graphics. The mod, titled Marvel vs. Capcom: Infinite & Beyond, introduces a cel-shaded art style akin to Marvel vs. Capcom 3. Although the original intent of Beyond was to simply update the visuals, the scope of the project eventually expanded to include new art, music, modes, and balance changes, among other things. Over forty people contributed to the mod over its eight months in development; Maximilian estimated he spent roughly US$30,000 of his own money to pay everyone. Beyond was released online for free in December 2024.
