= Marvel Super Heroes in War of the Gems =

1996 video game

- North American cover art by Glenn Fabry.
- Developer: Capcom
- Publishers: Capcom; Laguna Video Games (Europe)
- Composers: Takane Ōkubo; Katsunari Kitajima
- Platform: Super NES
- Release: JP: October 18, 1996; NA: November 21, 1996; EU: February 1997
- Genres: Platform, beat-'em-up
- Mode: Single-player

Marvel Super Heroes in War of the Gems (マーヴルスーパーヒーローズ ウォーオブザジェム, Māvuru Supā Hīrōzu: Wō obu za Jemu) is a 1996 beat-'em-up platform game developed by Capcom for the Super Nintendo Entertainment System, based on the events of Marvel Comics' series The Infinity Gauntlet and The Infinity War. In the game's plot, Adam Warlock calls upon Earth's greatest superheroes to seek out the Infinity Gems before they fall into the wrong hands.

Although War of the Gems is based on a similar storyline as the Capcom arcade game Marvel Super Heroes, and each of the playable characters retains one of the special moves they had in that game, it is not a port; War of the Gems instead features gameplay similar to Final Fight and X-Men: Mutant Apocalypse. In 2020, the game was rereleased as part of a home arcade cabinet from Arcade1Up alongside X-Men vs. Street Fighter, Marvel Super Heroes vs. Street Fighter and Marvel vs. Capcom: Clash of Super Heroes.

== Gameplay ==
Spider-Man fights a Puck doppelganger.

The player plays each level as one of five superheroes - Captain America, Iron Man, Spider-Man, Wolverine, or Hulk - as they battle through various locations around the globe and even outer space. Each character's health bar is separate and carries over between missions - healing can only be done by picking up items in the levels or using healing items picked up during missions. When a character is defeated, they must be revived individually with the appropriate item. A separate AIR meter displays how much the character can breathe while faced with an unfavorable environment, such as underwater or poison gas. The character must outrun the meter and get to safety while battling the enemies, lest he drown or choke out. After investigating an area, the player may or may not be rewarded with one of the gems resulting in a restart of the entire game.

Two of the Gems can be picked up during the first four missions, one is obtained after defeating Magus, and two more are randomly received in two of the four following levels. The last gem, Mind, is obtained after defeating Thanos and completing the game. Each character can select any of the obtained Gems before stages to obtain gameplay advantages: the Power Gem enables greater attack power; the Time Gem allows for faster movement; the Soul Gem doubles a character's health gauge; the Reality Gem makes extra items visible throughout the stage; and the Space Gem allows for higher jumps.

Playable characters include:

- Captain America: Balanced in both attack and speed, he's the second character to deliver powerful hits, as well as the second bulkiest character (all-around type).
- Iron Man: Powerful and fast, can use a variety of projectiles, and also has a double jump and high-speed air attack (all-around type).
- Hulk: The biggest character in the game, being the strongest, the slowest, the bulkiest, and with the lowest jump height (power type).
- Spider-Man: The fastest character in the game, but also the weakest. His attack lasts the longest. His low stance allows him to dodge some attacks without having to crouch. Can climb walls using his spider ability by pressing jump near them (speed type).
- Wolverine: A balanced fighter between Spider-Man and Captain America. Much like Spider-Man, he can climb walls using his adamantium claws and is relatively small (balanced type).

Throughout the levels, there are Doppelganger enemies of Wolverine, Hulk, and Iron Man to fight against, as well as of Daredevil, Hawkeye, Puck, She-Hulk, Silver Surfer, the Thing, and Vision. Blackheart, Nebula, Sasquatch, a Doombot, and Doctor Doom appear as bosses along with two Iron Man doppelgangers and Thanos.

== Release and reception ==
Reception

Review scores
| Publication | Score |
|---|---|
| Famitsu | 5/10, 4/10, 4/10, 4/10 |
| HobbyConsolas | 79/100 |
| M! Games | 56% |
| Mega Fun | 37% |
| Official Nintendo Magazine | 78/100 |
| Super Game Power | 4/5 |
| Total! | 2- |
| Ação Games | 9,5/10 |
| Nintendo Acción | 78/100 |
| Power Unlimited | 68/100 |

Marvel Super Heroes in War of the Gems was released on October 18, 1996 for the Super Famicom in Japan.

Marvel Super Heroes in War of the Gems received average reviews. Electronic Gaming Monthly highlighted the ability to choose any of the five superheroes for each level and the number of special moves each character has, but noted the game's repetitive nature.
