= Saki (disambiguation) =

Saki (1870–1916) was the pen name of Edwardian satirist H. H. Munro.

Saki may also refer to:

== People ==
- Saki (given name), female Japanese given name
- Saki (musician)
- Saki (wrestler)

== Places ==
- Saki, Azerbaijan
- Saki, Bielsk County in Podlaskie Voivodeship (north-east Poland)
- Saki, Gmina Kleszczele in Podlaskie Voivodeship (north-east Poland)
- Saki, Gmina Narew in Podlaskie Voivodeship (north-east Poland)
- Saki, India, village within greater Bombay
- Saki, Nigeria, a town situated in Oyo State
- Saki, Estonia, village in Rõuge Parish, Võru County
- Saki-ye Olya, a village in Markazi Province, Iran
- Saki-ye Sofla, a village in Markazi Province, Iran
- Saky, a town in Crimea
- Saky (air base), naval airbase in Crimea

== Animals ==
- Bearded saki, genus of New World monkey, Chiropotes
- Saki monkey, genus of New World monkey, Pithecia

== Arts, entertainment, and media ==
- Saki (TV series), a 1962 British anthology television series based on the British writer's works
- Saki (film), a 2017 live-action film based on the manga series
- Saki (manga), a manga and anime series by Ritz Kobayashi
- Saki Amamiya, the male protagonist in the Nintendo 64 video game Sin and Punishment
- "Saaki", a song by Sukhwinder Singh and Sunidhi Chauhan from the 2004 Indian film Musafir
  - "O Saki Saki", its remake for the 2019 Indian film Batla House, by Tanishk Bagchi, Vishal–Shekhar, Neha Kakkar, Tulsi Kumar and B Praak

== Other uses ==
- Saki Corporation, a Japanese electronics assembly machines company
- Maia language or Saki language, spoken in Madang Province, Papua New Guinea

== See also ==
- Sake (disambiguation)
- Saqi (disambiguation)
