= Saker =

Saker may refer to:

- Saker falcon (Falco cherrug), a species of falcon
- Saker (cannon), a type of cannon
- Saker Baptist College, an all-girls secondary school in Limbe, Cameroon
- Grupo Saker-Ti, a Guatemalan writers group formed in 1947
- Changwon LG Sakers, a South Korean basketball team
- Saker Cars, a sports car designed in New Zealand
- HMS Saker, a Royal Navy ship
- Saker LSV, a British Army light vehicle

== People ==
- Alan Saker (1921–2001), Australian rules footballer
- Alfred Saker (1814–1880), British Christian missionary to West Africa
- Annie Saker (1882–1932), English actress
- David Saker (born 1966), Australian first-class cricketer
- Dora Saker (1888–1926), cheese-maker for Somerset County Council
- Edward Saker (1838–1883), British actor-manager
- Frank Saker (1907–1980), Canadian flatwater canoeist
- Neil Saker (born 1984), English cricketer
- Rivka Saker, Israeli philanthropist and art collector
- Sardar Saker (1904–1973), Indian film director

== See also ==
- Sake (disambiguation)
- Don Sakers, American science fiction writer
- Saqr Abu Fakhr, assistant editor of the Journal of Palestine Studies
