= Marvel vs. Capcom Fighting Collection: Arcade Classics =

2024 video game

- Developer: Capcom
- Publisher: Capcom
- Producers: Shuhei Matsumoto; Takayuki Yoshida
- Series: Marvel vs. Capcom
- Engine: MT Framework
- Platforms: Nintendo Switch; PlayStation 4; Windows; Xbox One
- Release: Switch, PlayStation 4, Windows; September 12, 2024; Xbox One; February 4, 2025
- Genres: Fighting, beat 'em up
- Modes: Single-player, multiplayer

Marvel vs. Capcom Fighting Collection: Arcade Classics is a 2024 fighting game compilation developed and published by Capcom. It is a successor to Capcom Fighting Collection in 2022, and includes seven arcade titles developed as a collaboration with Marvel Comics, including the Marvel vs. Capcom series of crossover fighting games that were originally released between 1993 and 2000. It was released for the Nintendo Switch, PlayStation 4, and Windows in September 2024 digitally. Physical editions for the PlayStation 4 and Nintendo Switch were released in November 2024, while a digital Xbox One version was released in February 2025.

The collection was announced in June 2024. The game lineup includes Marvel Super Heroes (1995), Marvel vs. Capcom: Clash of Super Heroes (1998), and Marvel vs. Capcom 2: New Age of Heroes (2000), marking the first time these titles became available on new platforms since the seventh generation of video game consoles, as well as the first faithful console port of the beat 'em up title The Punisher (1993) and the first new console versions for X-Men: Children of the Atom (1994), X-Men vs. Street Fighter (1996), and Marvel Super Heroes vs. Street Fighter (1997) since their initial console releases. Each game supports online ranked and casual multiplayer modes with rollback netcode, leaderboards, and training and spectating modes, among other extras. The collection received generally favorable reviews.

== Gameplay ==
Included games
1993	The Punisher
1994	X-Men: Children of the Atom
1995	Marvel Super Heroes
1996	X-Men vs. Street Fighter
1997	Marvel Super Heroes vs. Street Fighter
1998	Marvel vs. Capcom: Clash of Super Heroes
1999
2000	Marvel vs. Capcom 2: New Age of Heroes

Marvel vs. Capcom Fighting Collection: Arcade Classics is a compilation of seven titles developed and published by Capcom, and based on or featuring Marvel Comics characters and properties. Most prominently, it collects ports of every arcade entry in the Marvel vs. Capcom franchise of crossover fighting games, from X-Men vs. Street Fighter to Marvel vs. Capcom 2: New Age of Heroes, as well as the two predecessor games X-Men: Children of the Atom and Marvel Super Heroes. This compilation notably marks the first console release of either Marvel Super Heroes or the original Marvel vs. Capcom: Clash of Super Heroes since their joint inclusion in the Marvel vs. Capcom Origins compilation in 2012, as well as the first re-release of Marvel vs. Capcom 2 on consoles since its high-definition (HD) remaster for PlayStation 3 and Xbox 360 in 2009. It also marks the first console appearance of the arcade version of Capcom's beat 'em up video game The Punisher since its initial release in 1993.

As with the previous Capcom Fighting Collection compilation, the collection features support for online multiplayer with rollback netcode, as well as support for Casual, Ranked and Tournament play on all titles, built in training and spectator modes, a quick save function, and a museum mode with viewable concept illustrations and key art, development docs, as well as an in-game music player with the full soundtracks for each game featured in the compilation. Notably, certain games in the collection also introduce features new to these releases. X-Men: Children of the Atom enables the ability to play as Magneto, Juggernaut, and Street Fighter guest character Akuma for the first time in an official capacity, as does Marvel Super Heroes introduce playable versions of Doctor Doom, Thanos and Darkstalkers guest character Anita; Marvel Super Heroes vs. Street Fighter also features an officially playable depiction of Cyber Akuma and, for the first time, Norimaro in internationally-released versions of the game. The fighting games in the compilation feature settings enabling the use of one-button commands for Hyper Combos in all offline and training modes, while not being available during online Ranked Matches. All games also have toggles to reduce screen flashing for sensitivity purposes, and undisclosed alterations have been made to certain stages in Clash of Super Heroes.

== Development ==
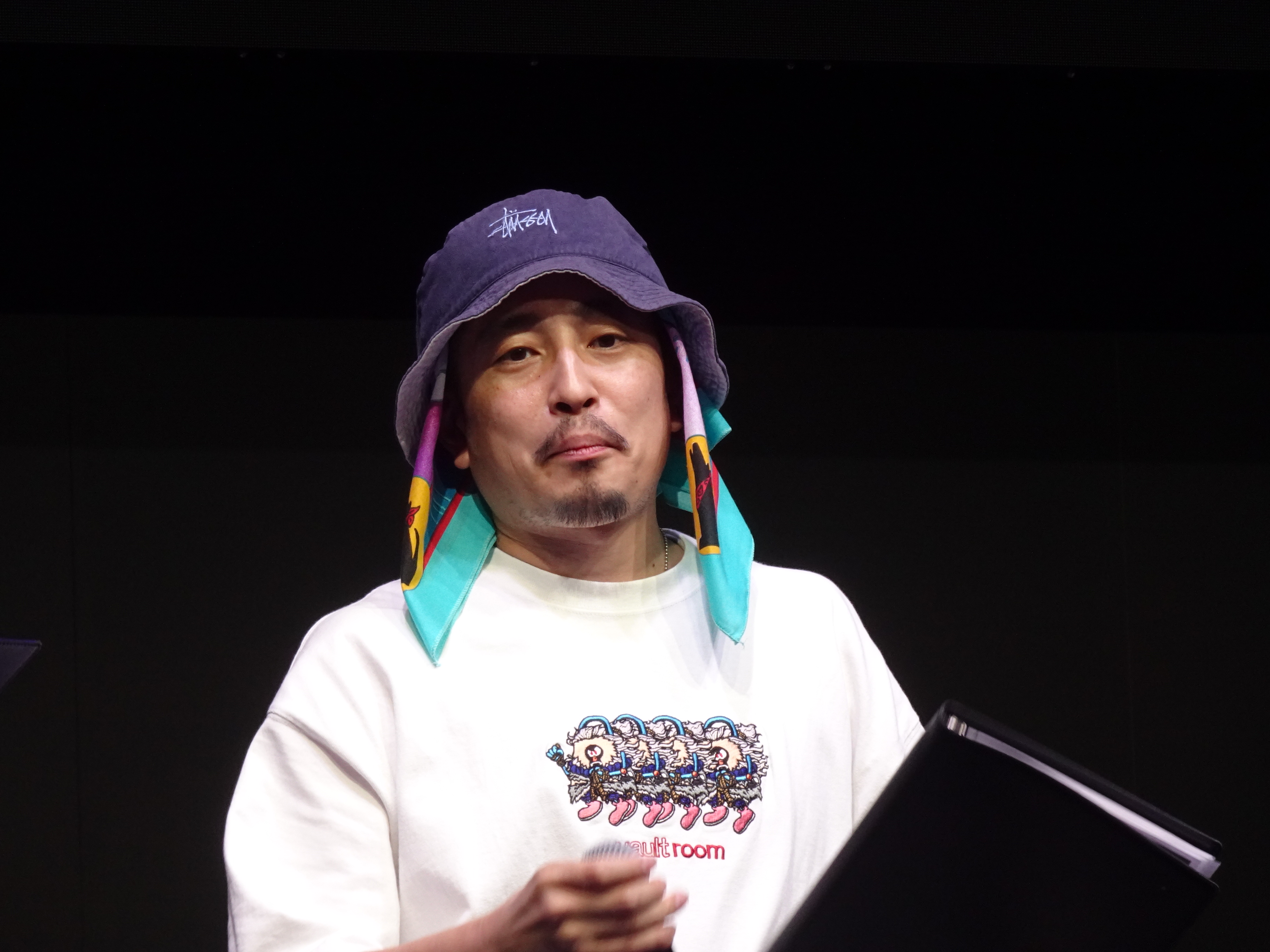
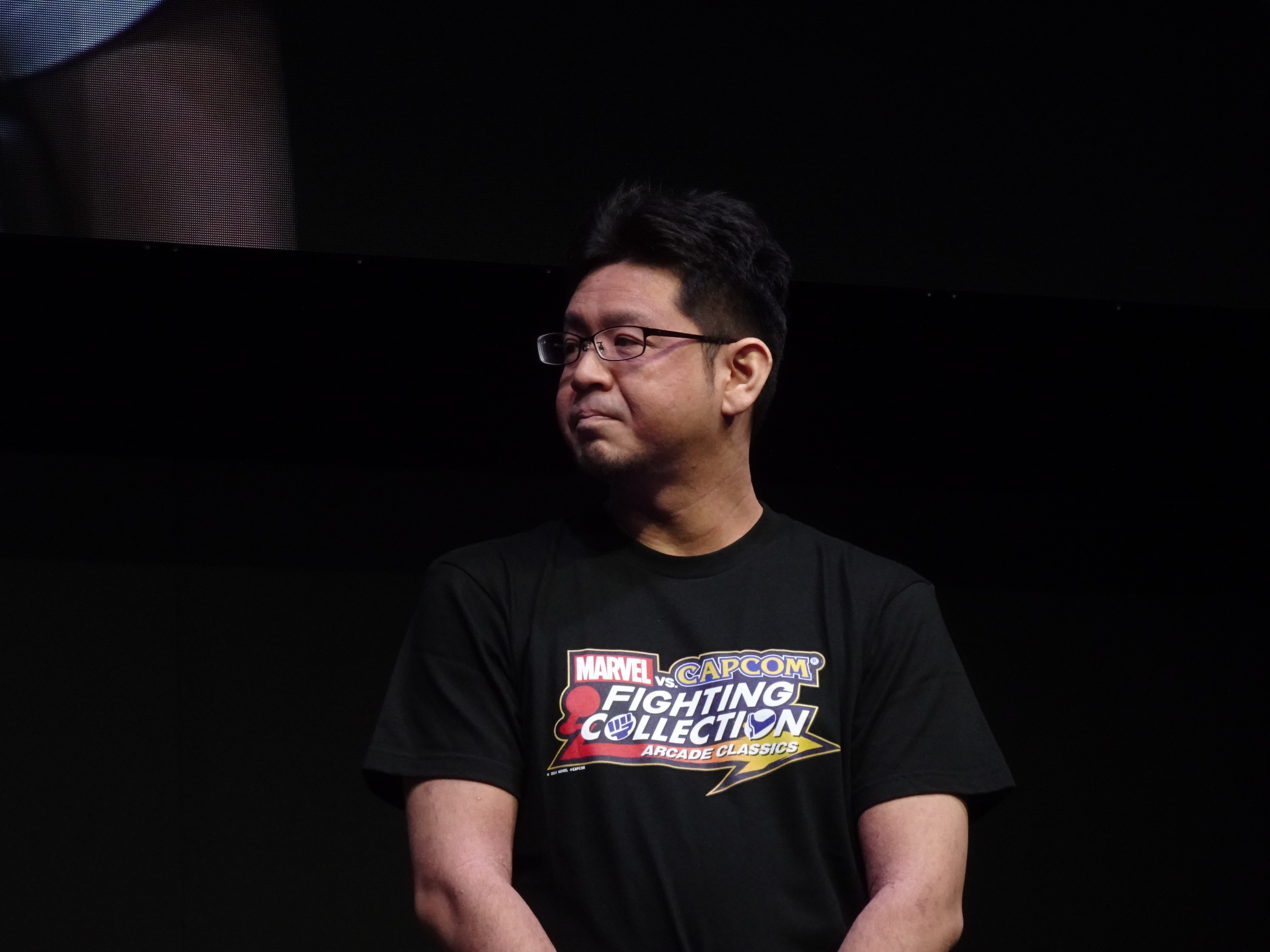
Shuhei Matsumoto (left) and Takayuki Yoshida (right) at the Tokyo Game Show 2024

=== Background ===
In December 2013, Capcom announced that the digital releases of Ultimate Marvel vs. Capcom 3 (2011), Marvel vs. Capcom Origins (2012) and the remastered Marvel vs. Capcom 2: New Age of Heroes (2009) for PlayStation 3 and Xbox 360 were to be delisted due to the expiration of their character licensing deals with Marvel Entertainment. At this time, Marvel's new parent, The Walt Disney Company, had elected not to renew any existing collaborations with external third-party developers using their characters, out of a desire to pivot towards using Marvel's licenses in their own internally developed and published console titles such as the Disney Infinity series.

In 2016, Disney discontinued both the series and their in-house game development efforts, restructuring Marvel Games to a licensing-only model that allowed them to distribute their characters to third-party partners again such as Capcom. Despite their partnership with Marvel being renewed with the development and releases of Marvel vs. Capcom: Infinite (2017) and the eighth-generation console and Windows ports of Ultimate Marvel vs. Capcom 3, the respective re-releases of the Origins titles and Marvel vs. Capcom 2 remained the last time prior entries in the Marvel vs. Capcom series were accessible on consoles, as subsequent re-issues of the games were relegated to novelty arcade cabinets targeted at an enthusiast audience.

The lack of accessibility for the legacy games in Capcom's Versus franchise inspired a fan campaign led by prominent fighting game streamer Maximilian Dood in August 2021, specifically advocating for re-releases of the classic Marvel vs. Capcom games onto modern consoles and PC to rejuvenate interest in the franchise, with particular attention towards Marvel vs. Capcom 2. Mike Mika, the studio head of Street Fighter 30th Anniversary Collection developer Digital Eclipse, acknowledged the fan campaign by expressing interest in a Marvel vs. Capcom 2 re-release, and the studio had reportedly entered discussions with Disney and Capcom to revive the title by September 2021.

=== Announcement ===
Marvel vs. Capcom Fighting Collection: Arcade Classics was announced in June 2024 during a Nintendo Direct presentation, as a compilation of the seven Marvel arcade games developed and published by Capcom, including the first console re-releases of Marvel Super Heroes (1995), Marvel vs. Capcom: Clash of Super Heroes (1998) and Marvel vs. Capcom 2: New Age of Heroes since their initial removal from seventh generation platforms. As part of the game lineup, the collection also featured the first arcade-faithful port of The Punisher (1993) on consoles, and the first general re-releases of the Marvel-themed fighting games X-Men: Children of the Atom (1994), X-Men vs. Street Fighter (1996) and Marvel Super Heroes vs. Street Fighter since their various console ports in the 1990s.

In contrast with the prior remaster of the game in 2009, which was primarily modeled after the Dreamcast version, the Arcade Classics version of Marvel vs. Capcom 2 is an emulation of the game's original arcade release, which applied across the collection's titles. Marvel Games Product Development Manager Laura Hathaway discussed Marvel vs. Capcom Fighting Collection during the first episode of The Official Marvel Podcast, citing Marvel's long-standing relationship with Capcom dating back to the 1990s, as well as a desire to surprise fans, as major reasons for greenlighting the compilation's development.

== Release ==
Marvel vs. Capcom Fighting Collection: Arcade Classics was released digitally for Nintendo Switch, PlayStation 4 and Windows on September 12, 2024 . A physical version for consoles was launched on November 22, 2024, marking the first time Marvel vs. Capcom 2: New Age of Heroes (2000) became available in such formats since the PlayStation 2 and Xbox ports in 2002. It is also the first physical release of the series entries preceding MvC2 since their original console ports throughout the 1990s, including of Marvel Super Heroes (1995) and Marvel vs. Capcom: Clash of Super Heroes (1998), both of which were last made available in the digital-only Marvel vs. Capcom Origins compilation in 2012 for PlayStation 3 and Xbox 360.

In EMEA regions, the physical Nintendo Switch release of the game omits a Game Card and instead comes with a download code for the digital version, similar to other physical releases of Capcom games for the console in the aforementioned territories. Arcade Classics is also the first entry in the Marvel vs. Capcom series to appear on a Nintendo platform, as well as the first time the arcade entries in the franchise have been ported to Windows PCs.

Pre-orders and day one editions of the game's physical release were shipped with a 32-page Marvel vs. Capcom one-shot published by Marvel Comics, with cover art by Todd Nauck. Various Marvel Comics publications in December 2024 were also accompanied by variant covers based on original Marvel vs. Capcom 2 character art by Bengus. An Xbox One version was later announced to be in development and was eventually released on February 4, 2025.

== Reception ==
=== Pre-release reactions ===
The announcement of Marvel vs. Capcom Fighting Collection was met with widespread acclaim from the fighting game community in light of the "#FreeMvC2" campaign to re-release the older Versus entries on modern platforms, along with surprise from spectators who observed the announcement took place within a presentation such as Nintendo Direct targeted at casual audiences as opposed to a fighting game-centric community venue like Evolution Championship Series.

The reveal incited various reactions from significant competitive fighting game players, streamers and other alumni such as Justin Wong, (Note: Appeared in least one official video promoting the collection) YipeS, Steven "Dream King" Chavez, and Maximilian Dood, the individual who inspired the movement advocating for the availability of the series' games on newer hardware. The collection's existence rejuvenated conversations in online communities regarding a potential revival of the series with a follow-up to Marvel vs. Capcom: Infinite (2017), with commentators attributing the materialization of the compilation towards Capcom's improved financial status since Infinite's original release due to consistent commercial success, a renewed relationship between Marvel and Capcom, as well as the acquisition of 21st Century Fox by Disney in 2019. The latter event resulted in Marvel re-acquiring the film rights to the X-Men and Fantastic Four characters after a period in the company's history involving the de-emphasis on media and merchandise around those properties due to corporate disputes with prior rights holder 20th Century Fox, in favor of licenses that were fully controlled in-house.

This development potentially allowed Capcom to negotiate for the inclusion of the X-Men, and Fantastic Four characters Doctor Doom, Super-Skrull, and Galactus in future games or re-issue past Versus titles featuring them, after those respective characters were entirely cut from Infinite to place a stronger focus around franchises appearing in internally-produced Marvel media at the time such as the Marvel Cinematic Universe (MCU) films.

The lack of a release for Xbox consoles drew backlash from the platform's player community, with many expressing disillusionment towards the decision to omit a version for either Xbox One or Xbox Series X/S due to the prior releases of Capcom legacy content on those respective platforms, notably the Street Fighter 30th Anniversary Collection in 2018 and the previous Capcom Fighting Collection in 2022, as well as prior Marvel vs. Capcom titles throughout the series' history. The community's reaction towards the announcement caused the phrase "No Xbox" to briefly trend on Twitter in North America.

Speculation arose relating the exclusion of an Xbox release to prior instances of Capcom not shipping certain remasters of their back catalogue content for the platform such as The Great Ace Attorney Chronicles collection in 2021, Mega Man Battle Network Legacy Collection in 2023, and the Monster Hunter Stories games in 2024, with some surmising the lack of a development infrastructure for optimizing Capcom's internal MT Framework engine across last and current generation systems simultaneously explained the lack of Xbox versions for Marvel vs. Capcom Fighting Collection, among other recent re-releases from the publisher, as well as the omission of a native PlayStation 5 version despite the PlayStation 4 version being playable on the console through backwards compatibility. Eventually on September 3, 2024, Capcom announced that they were working with Microsoft to release both Marvel vs. Capcom Fighting Collection and Capcom Fighting Collection 2 for Xbox One in 2025.

=== Post-release ===
Reception

Aggregate scores
Aggregator	Score
Metacritic	(NS) 86/100 (PC) 86/100 (PS4) 86/100 (XONE) 88/100
OpenCritic	95%

Review scores
Publication	Score
Destructoid	8/10
GameSpot	8/10
Hardcore Gamer	4/5
HobbyConsolas	88/100
MeriStation	8/10
Nintendo Life	9/10
Nintendo World Report	9.5/10
PCMag	4/5
Push Square	8/10
Shacknews	8/10
TechRadar	4/5
TouchArcade	4.5/5
Video Games Chronicle	4/5

Marvel vs. Capcom Fighting Collection: Arcade Classics received "generally favorable" reviews from critics, according to review aggregator Metacritic, and 95% of critics recommended the game, according to OpenCritic.

Upon the launch of the game, the online matchmaking system faced numerous issues, with many waiting half an hour to find a game despite the huge player count. Capcom acknowledged these issues and fixed them soon after.

Marvel vs. Capcom Fighting Collection: Arcade Classics was the 3rd most-downloaded game on PlayStation 4 in the United States and Canada in September 2024. That same month, it was the 16th best-selling game in the United States. From November 18 to 24, the Nintendo Switch version debuted as the 9th best-selling title in Japan. In November, Marvel vs. Capcom Fighting Collection: Arcade Classics was the 20th best-selling game in the United States.

By September 2025, Marvel vs. Capcom Fighting Collection: Arcade Classics had sold 1 million copies worldwide. As of March 31, 2026, the game had sold over 1.2 million copies worldwide. By June 30, sales had surpassed 1.3 million copies worldwide.

== See also ==
- Marvel vs. Capcom Origins - A 2012 compilation of Marvel Super Heroes and Marvel vs. Capcom: Clash of Super Heroes for PlayStation 3 and Xbox 360
