= Sake (disambiguation) =

Sake is a Japanese alcoholic beverage brewed from rice.

Sake may also refer to:

== Places ==
- Sake, Democratic Republic of the Congo, a town in the eastern province of North Kivu
- Sake, Rwanda, a town in Rwanda

== Other uses ==
- Sake, a Japanese word for salmon commonly used in sushi and other Japanese dishes
- Sake, meaning sheikh, an honorific title in the Arabic language
- Sake language, a Bantu language spoken in Gabon
- Sake Dean Mahomed (1759–1851)

== See also ==
- Saker (disambiguation)
- Saki (disambiguation)
- Sakić, a surname
