= Saqi =

Saqi may refer to:

- Saqi (film), Indian fantasy film by H. S. Rawail based on the Arabian Nights
- Saqi, Markazi, a village in Iran
- Saqi, Amanabad, a village in Markazi Province, Iran
- Saqi, Razavi Khorasan, a village in Iran
- Saqi, South Khorasan, a village in Iran
- Saqi (actor) (1925 – 1986), a Pakistani film actor

== See also ==
- Saki (disambiguation)
