= X-Men: Children of the Atom (video game) =

1994 video game

- Arcade flyer
- Developer: Capcom (Note: Ported to PlayStation and MS-DOS by Probe Entertainment and the Sega Saturn by Rutubo Games)
- Publisher: Capcom (Note: Console versions published outside Japan by Acclaim Entertainment.)
- Directors: Akira Nishitani; Noritaka Funamizu; Kei Hiratou; Kiyoshi Nishikawa; T.H.T. Fuji; Atsushi Tomita; MS-DOS; Amy Smith-Boylan
- Producers: MS-DOS; Tim Bradstock
- Series: X-Men
- Platforms: Arcade, Sega Saturn, MS-DOS, PlayStation
- Release: December 1994: Arcade; JP: December 1994; NA: January 5, 1995; EU: 1995 Saturn; JP: November 22, 1995; NA: April 3, 1996; EU: April 12, 1996 MS-DOS; NA: June 1997; EU: 1997 PlayStation; NA: March 3, 1998; EU: 1998
- Genre: Fighting
- Modes: Single-player, multiplayer
- Arcade system: CP System II

X-Men: Children of the Atom (Japanese: エックス・メン チルドレン オブ ジ アトム, Hepburn: Ekkusu Men Chirudoren obu ji Atomu) is a 1994 fighting game developed and published by Capcom and released on the CP System II arcade hardware. It was released in December 1994 in Japan and in January 1995 in North America and Europe.

Based on the X-Men comic book, it is the first fighting game produced by Capcom using characters under license from Marvel Comics. Released around the time of the mid-1990s X-Men animated series, the game features the voice actors from the series reprising their roles. The game's plot is based on the "Fatal Attractions" story from the comics. Players control one of the X-Men or their enemies in their fight against the villain Magneto. They face each of the other characters in best of three one-on-one fighting matches, before battling Juggernaut and Magneto.

The gameplay has much in common with Capcom's previous fighting games, Super Street Fighter II Turbo and Darkstalkers (both 1994). Children of the Atom adds a combo system that features long combos that can even be performed in mid-air. Also featured in the game are various tactical maneuvers, including the ability for characters to roll. Children of the Atom introduced multi-tiered fighting environments in which the ground would crumble and characters would fall into lower parts of the level. These concepts and the fast pace of the game would provide the basis for Capcom's Marvel vs. Capcom series, which began with X-Men vs. Street Fighter in 1996.

Ports of the game were released for Sega Saturn, PlayStation and MS-DOS. Of these, the PlayStation version was not as well received as the other versions, suffering from slowdown and missing frames of animation.

== Gameplay ==
Gameplay screenshot of a fight between Psylocke and Iceman.

X-Men follows the same fighting game controls and conventions Capcom previously established with the Street Fighter II games and the original Darkstalkers. The player can choose between one of six X-Men members or four of their enemies (for a total of ten selectable characters) and proceed to compete in a series of best-two-out-of-three one-on-one matches.

The player has an "X-Power" gauge (similar to the Super Combo gauge in Super Street Fighter II Turbo and the "Special" gauge in Darkstalkers) that builds as the player performs regular or special moves. X-Power gauge starts at Lv. 1 and reaches Lv. 2 when it becomes half-full and an Aura will begin to surround the player's character until it becomes full and reaches MAX level. Players can then perform an "X-Ability", which consumes a small portion of the X-Power gauge, or a "Hyper X", which consumes a greater portion of the same gauge. Breaking one's fall from a throw or performing a counter-throw will consume a portion of the X-Power gauge when performed.

Other features introduced in Children of the Atom include Super Jumps, the ability to roll away or towards an opponent after falling, the ability to determine the aim of a projectile move (such as Cyclops' optic blasts), and the ability to pursue an opponent after performing a throwing attack for follow-up attacks. After selecting a character, the player can choose between "manual" or "automatic" blocking. By selecting to automatically block attacks, some features will not be available during gameplay.

The single-player mode consists of six computer-controlled opponents and two non-playable boss characters. Unlike some games, the player cannot play against a clone of their own character. Akuma from Super Street Fighter II Turbo appears in the single-player mode as a secret opponent at the sixth match if the requirements are met.

== Plot ==
X-Men: Children of the Atom is loosely based on the "Fatal Attractions" storyline. The main antagonist is Magneto, who plans to unleash an electromagnetic pulse on the Earth that will disrupt the magnetic fields and create havoc on the world's electrical systems ushering in a Dark Age for Earth's non-mutant population. With the promise of a mutant-run planet, the X-Men's most formidable foes join forces with Magneto.

== Characters ==
- Akuma (Note: Hidden character; playable via cheat code)
- Colossus
- Cyclops
- Iceman
- Juggernaut (Note: Non-playable boss character.)
- Magneto
- Omega Red
- Psylocke
- Sentinel
- Silver Samurai
- Spiral
- Storm
- Wolverine

== Development ==
Capcom's contract with Marvel stipulated that Capcom include a character from the Street Fighter franchise in the game, so the developers included Akuma as a secret character.

The home version of the game was originally a Sega Saturn exclusive. The Saturn version premiered at Capcom's August 1995 Summer Festival; this was a 50% complete version with only Cyclops, Wolverine, Psylocke, and Iceman playable. According to Tatsuya Minami, Capcom's senior manager of the Product Planning and Design Section, the biggest difficulty with converting the game to the Saturn was the memory restrictions. All three of the leading game consoles of the time (Saturn, PlayStation, and 3DO) had only 2 megabytes of RAM, while the arcade version of X-Men: Children of the Atom used 32 megabytes for character data alone. Because of this, a third of the animation frames had to be cut for the Saturn version.

A PlayStation version was announced for a November 1996 release, but Capcom had difficulty with the conversion and contracted the project out to Probe Entertainment, who also handled the PC version. Probe also found converting the game to PlayStation to be a challenge, and the release date was pushed back all the way to the first quarter of 1998.

== Release ==
The arcade version of X-Men: Children of the Atom was released in Japan in December 1994, followed by North America on January 5, 1995. The soundtrack CD X-Men Arcade Game Track was released in Japan by Sony Records on March 24, 1995.

The Sega Saturn port was released by Capcom in Japan on November 22, 1995, and by Acclaim Entertainment in North America and Europe in April 1996. A Gamest Mook series guide book was published by Shinseisha on January 13, 1996. The home version of the game was originally a Saturn exclusive until Acclaim released versions for MS-DOS in June 1997 and the PlayStation on March 3, 1998; unlike the Saturn version, the MS-DOS and PlayStation versions were not released in Japan. The Japanese Saturn version allows players to play as the Juggernaut in the two-player Versus Mode via a cheat code. Capcom said that this was left in by mistake, hence why the ability to play as Juggernaut was not included in the North American or European releases, or in the later PlayStation version. The MS-DOS version allows players to play as either the Juggernaut or Magneto.

In 2019, the game was announced as one of the titles to be included in the Marvel Arcade1Up arcade cabinet. In June 2024, Capcom announced that Children of the Atom would be among the games included in the Marvel vs. Capcom Fighting Collection: Arcade Classics compilation (which was released in September of that year), marking the game's first home release since 1997. The Fighting Collection version includes the ability for players to control Juggernaut and Magneto.

== Reception ==
Reception

Review scores
Publication	Score
AllGame	4.5/5 (PC); 3.5/5 (Saturn)
Edge	8/10 (Saturn)
Electronic Gaming Monthly	5/10 (PlayStation)
Game Informer	8.25/10 (Saturn); 4.5/10 (PlayStation)
GameRevolution	B− (Saturn)
GameSpot	6.7/10 (PC)
IGN	3.5/10 (PlayStation)
Next Generation	3/5 (Arcade, Saturn); 2/5(PlayStation)
Computer Games Magazine	3/5 (PC)
Maximum	5/5(Saturn)
Sega Saturn Magazine	94% (Saturn)

X-Men: Children of the Atom was very well-received in the arcades and on the Sega Saturn. However, the PC version's reception was mixed, and the reviews of the PlayStation version were especially poor.

In Japan, Game Machine listed X-Men: Children of the Atom as the fifth most successful arcade game of February 1995. In North America, RePlay reported it to be the most popular arcade game of March 1995. Covering the arcade version, a reviewer for Next Generation highly praised the selection of characters, the interface, the new special move mechanics, the animations, and the voice overs. He nonetheless concluded that, "Extras aside though, this is still just a meat and potatoes fighting game, no better or worse than several others currently in the arcades."

Scary Larry of GamePro said the game was "converted perfectly" to the Saturn and applauded the accessible controls, fast gameplay, colorful graphics, and lack of slowdown. Sega Saturn Magazine declared the Saturn version "arcade perfect" aside from a few barely noticeable missing animation frames, and called the game itself "the first time comic book superheroes have been successfully translated to game format." They especially praised the well-balanced and distinctive characters and the combo system. A reviewer for Next Generation bemoaned the 2D fighting game genre as done to death, but admitted that X-Men: Children of the Atom manages to be highly appealing in spite of this. He complimented the smooth animation, brightly colored graphics, and balance of character strengths and weaknesses, and acknowledged that "Character recognition of the X-Men adds to the experience". Maximum focused praise on the accuracy of the conversion, saying that it was graphically almost identical to the arcade version and loyally recreated the gameplay. They also praised the home-only features, especially the survival mode, and gave it their "Maximum Game of the Month" award. In the June 1996 issue of Computer and Video Games, the Sega Saturn version of X-Men: Children of the Atom ranked 12th on the magazine's UK multi-format sales chart and fourth on its American multi-format chart.

GameSpot's review of the PC version opened by calling it "an admirable and near-exact conversion of Capcom's 1995 arcade hit" which "proves that the PC is indeed a viable platform for fighting games", but went on to criticize that it does not run as fast or at as high a resolution as the arcade version, and lacks the ability to chain combos.

Reviews for the PlayStation version commented that by the time of its release, two years after the Saturn version, the game was too far behind the times. The four reviewers of Electronic Gaming Monthly pointed out that its successor Marvel Super Heroes was already available on PlayStation, and that a PlayStation port of X-Men vs. Street Fighter was due out shortly. Next Generation stated that "Overall, if you crave 2D fighting fare, you can do worse than this game, but you can also do much better. What X-Men: Children of the Atom mostly proves is that companies should learn to stop projects before they spiral past the time when they're relevant." Critics also judged it a poor conversion given the length of time it spent in development, citing extensive slowdown and frustratingly choppy animation due to the numerous cut frames. Shawn Smith of Electronic Gaming Monthly cited the game as further proof that Capcom's 2D fighters were not as well-suited to the PlayStation as they were to the Saturn, additionally commenting that the PlayStation controller does not work as well with the games as the Saturn's, and concluded, "I know I'm not supposed to mention the 'S' word in this review but in truth, it's hard to get excited over an ancient game like X-Men for the PS when the aged Saturn version is so much better."

According to a retrospective review by GameFan, the game "displayed some of the most chaotic and over-the-top action found in a fighter at the time (...) achieving much success and praise across arcade rooms." The Saturn home version achieved "an experience that was nearly 1:1 in comparison to the CPS-2 behemoth." The PlayStation port "suffered from missing frames, slowdown and lengthy load times" due to the platform's limited RAM and its architecture restrictions in regards to 2D games, but was called "an admirable attempt" nevertheless. In 2011, GamePro retrospectively listed "terrific voice-acting (using some of the same voices from the series), and a real dedication to the characters from the lore" among its strong features, noting that "many of the sprites and movesets would be utilized in the many, many Capcom fighting games that would feature the X-Men," and adding that "some character imbalances and a small character roster are about the only thing you can knock it for, even today."

In 2012, GamesRadar included it among the little-known classic fighting games that deserve HD remakes, adding that "Capcom set the precedent with this lavish-looking fighter, cramming in the fan service, captivating graphics, and frantic gameplay that the Versus series is now known for, but in the one-on-one variety." In 2013, Nerdist included it on its list of the "Top Ten Most Iconic Marvel Video Games", calling it "a strike of gold, given how it's paved the way for the fighting games following it. [Children of the Atom] introduced features such as the dynamic combo system, air combos, and destructible multi-leveled fighting environments. (...) It also helped that this game had the best soundtrack out of any Marvel-licensed game ever conceived." In 2013, Geek Magazine ranked Children of the Atom 17th on its list of "Marvel Comics' 25 Best Video Games". In 1996, GamesMaster ranked the Saturn version third on its list of "The GamesMaster Saturn Top 10."
