= Šakić =

Šakić is a Serbo-Croatian surname, derived from the word šaka, meaning "fist". Notable people with the name include:

- Dinko Šakić, Croatian fascist, commander of Jasenovac concentration camp
- Marko Šakić, Croatian ice hockey player
- Miladin Šakić, former president of FK Red Star
- Nikola Šakić, Serbian footballer

Sakic, the spelling without diacritics, may refer to:

- Brian Sakic, Canadian ice hockey player
- Joe Sakic, Canadian ice hockey player

== See also ==
- Sakić
