= Saki (given name) =

- Pronunciation: Sa-ki
- Gender: Female

Origin
- Origin: Japanese
- Region of origin: Japanese

Saki (written: 咲, 沙紀, 沙季, サキ, or さき) is a feminine and occasionally masculine Japanese given name. Notable people with the name include:

== People ==
=== Women ===
- Saki (born 1990), Japanese musician
- Saki Aibu (born 1985), Japanese actress
- Saki Akai (born 1987), Japanese professional wrestler, idol, model and terento
- Saki Fujita (born 1984), Japanese voice actress
- Saki Fukuda (born 1990), Japanese actress and singer
- Saki Hatsumi (born 1990), Japanese pornographic film actress
- Saki Hayashi (林 咲希; born 1995), Japanese women's basketball player
- Saki Hiwatari (born 1961), Japanese manga artist
- Saki Kagami (born 1985), Japanese actress and singer
- Saki Kashima (born 1993), Japanese professional wrestler and adult model
- Saki Kubota (久保田早紀) (born 1958), Japanese singer-songwriter
- Saki Kumagai (born 1990), Japanese association footballer
- Saki Minemura (born 1990), Japanese volleyball player
- Saki Mizushima (水島 沙紀; born 1991), Japanese women's basketball player
- Saki Nakajima (voice actress) (born 1978), Japanese voice actress
- Saki Nakajima (singer) (born 1994), Japanese idol singer (Cute)
- Saki Ogawa (born 1996), Japanese idol singer (S/mileage)
- Saki Ooga (born 2000), a Japanese idol singer (Sakura Gakuin)
- Saki Satomi (里見 咲紀; born 1996), Japanese shogi player
- Saki Seto (born 1985), a Japanese actress, gravure idol, and TV personality
- Saki Shibata (芝田 沙季; born 1997), Japanese table tennis player
- Saki Shimizu (born 1991), Japanese idol singer (Berryz Kobo)
- Saki Shirai (born 2000), a Japanese idol singer (Sakura Gakuin)
- Saki Takaoka (born 1972), Japanese actress
- Saki Takashima (高島 咲季; born 2002), Japanese sprinter
- Saki Watanabe (born 1988), Japanese professional wrestler

=== Men ===
- Saki Hasemi, male Japanese manga artist and writer
- Saki, the nickname of Masaki Liu, a California musician

== Fictional characters ==
=== Women ===
- Saki Akasaka, a personality of the character Kozue Aoba in the manga and anime series Mahoraba Heartful Days
- Saki Amano, a main character in the anime/manga series Kanamemo
- Saki Hanajima, a character in the manga and anime series Fruits Basket
- Saki Arima, a main character in the anime/manga series Your Lie in April
- Saki Hyūga, a co-protagonist of Futari wa Pretty Cure Splash Star
- Saki Saki, a main character in the anime series Girlfriend Girlfriend
- Saki Miyanaga, the main character in the manga and anime series Saki
- Saki Morimi, one of the main characters in the anime series Eden of the East
- Saki Nijino, a character in the video game Tokimeki Memorial: Forever with you
- Saki Nagisa, the younger sister of Kubo from the manga and anime series Kubo Won't Let Me Be Invisible
- Saki Nikaido, a character from the MAPPA idol anime series Zombie Land Saga
- Saki Omokane, one of the seven heroines in the quiz game/dating sim Quiz Nanairo Dreams
- Saki Royama, a main character from the 2008 Japanese tokusatsu television series Engine Sentai Go-onger
- Saki Tenjouin, a character in the manga and anime series To LOVE-Ru
- Saki Tsuzura, a character in the video game series Arcana Heart
- Saki Sukinasaki, a character from the manga and anime series Medaka Box
- Saki, a character from the hentai series Cool Devices
- Steel Angel Saki, a character from the manga and anime series Steel Angel Kurumi
- Saki, a minor recurring character from Grandia 1
- Saki Miyu, a character in the video game Yandere Simulator
- Saki Konishi, a character in the video game/anime Persona 4
- Saki Yoshida, the main character in the hentai manga Metamorphosis
- Saki Sorai, a character in the role-playing video game Blue Archive
- Saki Tenma, a character in the mobile game Hatsune Miku: Colorful Stage!
- Saki Watanabe, a character from novel series From the New World
- Saki Kitajima, a character in the video game and anime series Little Battlers Experience
- Saki Hanami, a character in the game Gakuen Idolmaster
- Saki Kurokoma, a fictional character in Wily Beast and Weakest Creature from the video game franchise Touhou Project

=== Men ===
- Saki Amamiya, the male main character in the video game Sin and Punishment
- Saki Hananoi, the titular male main character in A Condition Called Love
- Saki Oroku, a male villain in the TMNT stories
- Saki Mizushima, a male character from The Idolmaster SideM
