= Maximilian Dood =

American YouTuber and Twitch streamer (born 1983)

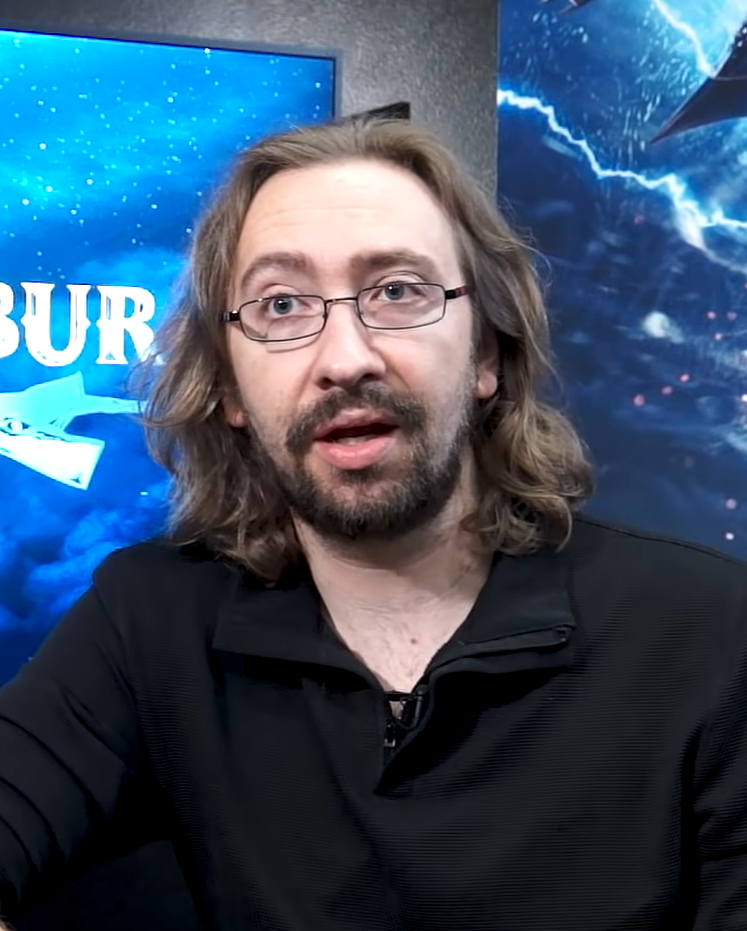
- Christiansen in 2018
- Born: Maximilian Miles Christiansen; September 23, 1983 (age 43)
- Occupations: YouTuber; Twitch streamer

Twitch information
- Channel: Maximilian_DOOD
- Years active: 2014–present
- Genres: Gaming; reaction
- Game: Fighting
- Followers: 1.3 million

YouTube information
- Channel: Maximilian Dood
- Years active: 2007–present
- Genres: Gaming; Let's play; walkthroughs
- Subscribers: 1.85 million
- Views: 1.48 billion
- Last updated: December 7, 2025

Maximilian Miles Christiansen (born September 23, 1983), also known as his pseudonym Maximilian Dood, is an American YouTuber and Twitch streamer. Considered a prominent figure in the fighting game community, Christiansen primarily makes video content on various fighting games, such as Street Fighter, Marvel vs. Capcom and Killer Instinct 2013. He is also known for his grassroots efforts to organize fighting game tournaments along with his campaigns to revive various fighting game series.

== Early and personal life ==
Maximilian Miles Christiansen was born on September 23, 1983, to Diane Christiansen, an acting coach from Illinois, and was raised in Los Angeles, California. Christiansen has Dutch roots from his paternal side. Before becoming a YouTuber, he had worked as an animator and illustrator. Christiansen is married; his wife, Jessica, gave birth to their daughter, Ripley, named after the Sigourney Weaver character in Alien, in 2020. His younger sister Tess Lauren Christiansen (b. 1989), is an actress and appeared in the slasher film Most Likely to Die.

In October 2021, Christiansen's financial information on Twitch was revealed after a massive leak.

== Internet career ==
=== Video content ===
Christiansen created his Maximilian Dood YouTube channel in 2007, and after being fired from his job as an online video game producer in 2011 began to make videos as a full-time job. His content primarily revolves around fighting games, covering titles from fighting game series such as Street Fighter, Mortal Kombat, Tekken and Soulcalibur. He moved his streaming to Twitch as a full-time career with replays on YouTube, until his contract ended in 2024. His first video was in 2013, a streamed video playing against Justin Wong for the original season of Killer Instinct. As of 2024 his YouTube channel has over 1.7 million subscribers and his Twitch channel has over 1,300,000 followers. Christiansen also has a second channel, "Yo! Videogames", which features him playing multiplayer games with friends Matthew "Matt" Simmons (who acts as this channel's moderator), Kenny "UnRooolie" O'Brien and Steve "Steeb"/"Infinite" Springer.

Christiansen's style of content combines aspects of informative walkthroughs and reaction-based playthroughs. He created the web series Assist Me! for Capcom's Marvel Vs. Capcom 3 game which discussed the game's mechanics, characters and various strategies with comedic skits in between. In his Mortal Kombat videos, he showcased how to perform different fatalities alongside humorous "hidden character" intros. Several of his Mortal Kombat videos which featured such gruesome fatalities were eventually demonetized and age-restricted in 2019, following the release of Mortal Kombat 11. In January 2017, his video on Injustice 2 received coverage for showcasing the improvements made to the character models on the game from its initial footage in 2016, detailing the flaws on character faces such as that of Supergirl and Wonder Woman and speculating that NetherRealm Studios had polished the game before its initial release. Besides fighting games, Christiansen has made videos on other video games such as showcasing a Bayonetta 2 easter egg involving a reference to the Nintendo series Star Fox, which received coverage from Eurogamer in 2014. Christiansen has also made a sizeable amount of content surrounding his favorite game of all time, Final Fantasy VII, and its related titles from the Compilation of Final Fantasy VII and the Final Fantasy VII Remake project.

Following the closure of Machinima in 2019, Christiansen was dropped from the multi-channel network due to his Assist Me and Boss Rage videos receiving copyright claims for their usage of music.

=== FGC activities ===
As a prominent member of the fighting game community (FGC), Christiansen is known for organizing grassroots fighting game online tournaments alongside campaigning for the revival of several fighting games. In August 2021, Christiansen created a social media campaign advocating for a rerelease of the 2000 fighting game Marvel vs. Capcom 2, which had been delisted from multiple online stores due to licensing issues between Marvel and Capcom; initially slated to make a comeback in Evo 2020, the game ultimately did not make an appearance due to the cancellation of the event. Christiansen's campaign led to #FREEMVC2 trending on Twitter and Mike Mika, the studio head for Digital Eclipse, expressing interest in re-releasing the game. Marvel vs. Capcom 2 was eventually re-released as part of Marvel vs. Capcom Fighting Collection: Arcade Classics in 2024, with Christiansen present in at least one promotional video for the collection. In June 2019, two years prior to his Marvel Vs. Capcom 2 campaign, he had created a Killer Instinct campaign to revive the series which also trended on Twitter.

In January 2021, Christiansen hosted a Killer Instinct tournament which he streamed on Twitch under a partnership with Twitch Rivals. In addition to being a fan of the series, he had previously worked with developer Iron Galaxy to create promotional material and character trailers for the reboot. The stream reached over 41,000 concurrent viewers. On May 24, 2021, Christiansen also hosted a Mortal Kombat X Lives tournament with Ryan "Mr. Aquaman" Kablik hosting the qualifiers on his YouTube channel two days prior. However, the tournament was stopped and subsequently postponed due to an incident involving multiple players having their personal information leaked during the livestream. Christiansen and Twitch Rivals announced that they will hold the second part of the event in the future. Christiansen also acted as the director of Marvel vs. Capcom: Infinite & Beyond, a 2024 mod for Marvel vs. Capcom Infinite that adds new features and implements a cel-shaded art style in response to longstanding criticism of the game's graphics.

== Other works ==
Christiansen appeared in two episodes of Did You Know Gaming? in 2014, discussing trivia on Street Fighter and Killer Instinct. Christiansen appears as an assist character in the 2022 beat 'em up game Jitsu Squad. In July 2023, a special cosmetics collaboration between Christiansen and Naraka: Bladepoint was released. Christiansen makes a cameo appearance in the 2026 Street Fighter film.

== Awards and nominations ==
Year	Ceremony	Category	Result	Ref.
2023	The Streamer Awards	Legacy Award	Won	
2023	The Streamer Awards	Best Fighting Games Streamer	Nominated	

== See also ==
- Esports
