= Marvel Super Heroes (video game) =

1995 video game

- Japanese arcade flyer
- Developer: Capcom
- Publishers: Capcom; Saturn, PlayStation: JP/NA: Capcom; PAL: Virgin Interactive Entertainment
- Designers: Kei Hiratou; Satoru Kimura; Kiyoshi Nishikawa
- Programmers: Kaw-K.Marichan; Nobu-Sasami; T. Ueno
- Composers: Takayuki Iwai; Yuki Iwai; Tatsuro Suzuki
- Platforms: Arcade, Sega Saturn, PlayStation
- Release: Arcade: JP/NA: November 1995; Saturn: JP: August 8, 1997; NA: October 2, 1997; EU: January 24, 1998; PlayStation: JP: September 25, 1997; NA: September 30, 1997; EU: November 14, 1997
- Genre: Fighting
- Modes: Single-player, multiplayer
- Arcade system: CP System II

Marvel Super Heroes (マーヴル・スーパーヒーローズ, Māvuru Sūpā Hīrōzu) is a 1995 fighting game developed and published by Capcom. Originally released for arcades on the CPS-2 arcade system, it was ported to the Sega Saturn and PlayStation in 1997. The game, alongside Marvel vs. Capcom: Clash of Super Heroes, was also included in the Marvel vs. Capcom Origins compilation, released digitally for the PlayStation 3 and Xbox 360 in 2012.

Marvel Super Heroes is loosely based on "The Infinity Gauntlet" storyline of the Marvel Universe. It is the second Capcom fighting game based on characters from Marvel Comics, following 1994's X-Men: Children of the Atom. It was succeeded by X-Men vs. Street Fighter, the first entry in the Marvel vs. Capcom series, in 1996.

== Gameplay ==
Gameplay screenshot of a fight between Spider-Man and Thanos

Marvel Super Heroes is a fighting game in which superheroes and villains from the Marvel Universe fight against each other. Loosely based on The Infinity Gauntlet storyline, the game focuses on heroes and villains battling each other for the Infinity Gems. The main antagonist is Thanos, who plots to use the Infinity Gems to take over the universe.

The aim of the game is to use attacks and special abilities to knock out the opponent, or possess more life than him/her at the end of the round. Throughout the match, players build up a super meter which can be used to perform powerful Infinity Combo attacks. A unique mechanic in the game are the Infinity Gems; Power, Time, Space, Reality, Soul and Mind. These gems can be earned by obtaining them from opponents during arcade mode, or by fulfilling certain criteria during versus mode, such as getting the first hit. By using these gems in battle, fighters receive enhanced effects for a short amount of time, such as increased power or defense, health recovery or additional attacks. Certain fighters will receive extra benefits whilst using certain gems. For example, if Spider-Man uses the Power Gem, he can create a doppelganger on the opposite side of his opponent for extra damage during his attacks.

=== Playable characters ===
- Anita (Note: Hidden character in original Japanese version and unlockable in later ports.)
- Blackheart
- Captain America
- Doctor Doom (Note: Unlockable boss character.)
- Hulk
- Iron Man
- Juggernaut
- Magneto
- Psylocke
- Shuma-Gorath
- Spider-Man
- Thanos
- Wolverine

== Development and release ==
Capcom included the four characters from X-Men: Children of the Atom which their market research had determined to be the most popular: Wolverine, Juggernaut, Magneto and Psylocke.

The home conversions of the game were unveiled on the first day of the 1996 Electronic Entertainment Expo, with Stan Lee appearing at the booth. The Saturn version supports the 1 MB RAM expansion cartridge to include extra frames of animation and slightly quicker load times.

Initially the Saturn and PlayStation versions were both scheduled to be released in Europe in time for Christmas 1997, but Capcom's European publisher Virgin Interactive delayed the Saturn version until January 24, 1998, so that it could be bundled with the 1 MB RAM cartridge.

On September 26, 2012, the game was re-released with Marvel vs. Capcom: Clash of Super Heroes as part of the Marvel vs. Capcom Origins digital compilation for Xbox 360 (via Xbox Live Arcade) and PlayStation 3 (via PlayStation Network). In 2019, the game was announced as one of the titles to be included in the Marvel Arcade1Up arcade cabinet. In June 2024, Capcom announced that Marvel Super Heroes would be among the games included in the Marvel vs. Capcom Fighting Collection: Arcade Classics compilation, which was released the following September.

The game was dedicated to Marvel artist Jack Kirby, who died on February 6, 1994.

== Reception ==
Reception

Aggregate score
Aggregator	Score		
Aggregator	Arcade	PS	Saturn
GameRankings		69% (8 reviews)	77% (5 reviews)

Review scores
Publication	Score		
Publication	Arcade	PS	Saturn
Computer and Video Games	5/5	4/5	5/5
Edge			8/10
Electronic Gaming Monthly		6.5/10, 7/10, 7.5/10, 7.5/10	7.5/10, 7/10, 8/10, 8/10
Famitsu		28/40	29/40
Game Informer	9.25/10		8.75/10
GameFan			269/300
GameRevolution			B
GamesMaster			90%
GameSpot		5.6/10	5.8/10
IGN		7/10	
Next Generation	3/5		3/5
Sega Saturn Magazine			95%

In Japan, Game Machine listed Marvel Super Heroes as the eleventh most successful arcade game of December 1995.

The arcade version received positive reviews. Computer and Video Games awarded it a full 5/5 rating. Despite scoring it only three out of five stars, Next Generation gave it a relentlessly positive review, saying it "blends loads of combo-powered attacks with liquid-smooth animation to contend with some of the best fighters out there." They were also pleased with the selection of Marvel characters and the 2D graphics, saying they make a "refreshing" change from the polygon-based fighters that by this time were dominating the fighting games market. Wizard opined that "with great graphics, challenging gameplay and plenty of moves, throws and counters, Marvel Super Heroes has much to offer."

The Saturn version was widely praised as having the same large, detailed sprites as the arcade version, though some criticized the slowdown which occurs when the RAM expansion cart is used and/or larger characters are on screen. GamePro called it "an excellent port of the arcade game which was a quarter-burner last year." Rich Leadbetter of Sega Saturn Magazine praised the Saturn conversion for retaining all the scenery effects of the arcade version, and commented that "Marvel Super Heroes makes 2D graphics cool again". By contrast, in text repeated in GameSpot's reviews of both the Saturn and PlayStation versions, Jeff Gerstmann concluded, "While I found the arcade game a blast, this version just seemed dull and boring. Whether this can be attributed to the translation itself or the fact that several, mostly better, Capcom fighters have been released in arcades since Marvel, I don't know." Electronic Gaming Monthly's four reviewers were split, with Sushi-X and John Ricciardi hailing the Saturn conversion as impressive, while Kelly Rickards and Dan Hsu considered it passable but disappointing. In turn, Sushi-X and Rickards found the game itself flashy with little balance and technique, while Ricciardi and Hsu felt it had depth beneath its flash. Next Generation approved of the conversion but argued that the gameplay was not enough of an advancement over previous Capcom fighting games, ensuring that "Newcomers to the series should give a spin, but veterans might want to wait until the fabled X-Men vs. Street Fighter arrives at the end of the year."

Critics generally regarded the PlayStation version as inferior to the Saturn version, due to the Saturn version having less slowdown and more frames of animation. GamePro cited the game as evidence that the PlayStation could not handle 2D as well as the Saturn, rated the PlayStation version lower than the Saturn version in every category except graphics, and summarized that "Although it's identical to the Saturn version in features ... the PlayStation game loses serious points for its unplayability." The same four EGM reviewers covered the Saturn and PlayStation versions, with each of the four rating the PlayStation version half a point lower than the Saturn version. Gerstmann said the speech samples have better quality in the PlayStation version, but still regarded the Saturn version as "slightly better".

In 2013, Marvel Super Heroes ranked as the 16th best Marvel video game by Geek Magazine for its "chaotic, yet insanely fun, gameplay." That same year, Rich Knight and Gus Turner of Complex included it on their list of 25 best 2D fighting games of all time, stating that the gem-collecting "mechanic was a big difference-maker for the title and, as a result, the game still feels fresh today."

== See also ==
- Marvel Super Heroes: War of the Gems - A side-scrolling action game produced by Capcom for the Super NES.
- Marvel vs. Capcom: Infinite - Another Capcom fighting game focusing on the Infinity Gems.
