= Sakić =

Sakić (Serbian Cyrillic: Сакић) is a Serbo-Croatian surname. Notable people with the surname include:

- Sinan Sakić (born 1956), Serbian folk singer
- Nenad Sakić (born 1971), former Serbian footballer

== See also ==
- Šakić
