= Marvel Super Heroes vs. Street Fighter =

1997 video game

- Japanese arcade flyer
- Developer: Capcom
- Publishers: Capcom; PlayStation: JP/NA: Capcom; PAL: Virgin Interactive Entertainment
- Producer: Kenji Kataoka
- Composers: Yuki Iwai; Yuko Kadota
- Series: Marvel vs. Capcom; Street Fighter
- Platforms: Arcade, Sega Saturn, PlayStation
- Release: Arcade: JP: July 1997; NA: November 1997; Saturn: JP: October 22, 1998; PlayStation: NA: February 23, 1999; JP: February 25, 1999; EU: May 1999
- Genre: Fighting
- Modes: Single-player, multiplayer
- Arcade system: CP System II

Marvel Super Heroes vs. Street Fighter (Note: Japanese: マーヴルスーパーヒーローズバーサスストリートファイター, Hepburn: Māvuru Sūpā Hīrōzu bāsasu Sutorīto Faitā) is a 1997 crossover fighting game developed and published by Capcom. It is the sequel to X-Men vs. Street Fighter (1996) and the second installment in the Marvel vs. Capcom series. After its release for arcades, it received ports to the Sega Saturn in 1998 and the PlayStation in 1999.

The gameplay and aesthetics of Marvel Super Heroes vs. Street Fighter remain similar to X-Men vs. Street Fighter. Each player selects two characters to compete in a one-on-one tag team fight, attempting to defeat the opposing team. The game replaces most of the X-Men cast from the previous installment with characters from other Marvel properties. In addition, it introduces a new gameplay mechanic known as the "Variable Assist", which would be used in future Marvel vs. Capcom titles.

Much like its predecessor, the game received generally positive reviews for its gameplay, sprite animations, and character roster. The Sega Saturn version, utilizing the 4 MB RAM expansion cartridge, was praised for being an arcade-perfect conversion. Due to the memory limitations of the PlayStation, tag team battles were once again removed from its port, resulting in more mixed critical reception. The game was followed by Marvel vs. Capcom: Clash of Super Heroes in 1998.

== Gameplay ==
Blackheart summons Shuma-Gorath to attack Chun-Li. Marvel Super Heroes vs. Street Fighter was the first game to introduce assists to the Marvel vs. Capcom series.

Marvel Super Heroes vs. Street Fighter is the second installment in the Marvel vs. Capcom series of 2D fighting games. It utilizes the same one-on-one tag team format previously employed in X-Men vs. Street Fighter. The player chooses a team of two fighters, each sporting their own life gauge; at the start of the match, the first selected character is controlled by the player, while the second character remains off-screen and acts as support. Using a combination of joystick movements and button presses, the player must execute various moves to deplete the opposing team's life gauges. The first player to completely drain the opponent's health is declared the winner. If the timer reaches zero, the player that possesses the most health wins.

The most notable gameplay change in Marvel Super Heroes vs. Street Fighter is the addition of the "Variable Assist". With the Variable Assist, the player can summon their off-screen character to perform a special move without changing their currently-controlled character, opening new possibilities for combos during battle and greatly expanding the role of the secondary character. The ability to use assists would later become a signature gameplay element used in several future installments of the Marvel vs. Capcom series.

=== Modes ===
The arcade, Sega Saturn, and PlayStation versions of Marvel Super Heroes vs. Street Fighter share Arcade Mode and Versus Mode. In Arcade Mode, the player fights waves of artificial intelligence-controlled teams, culminating in a penultimate battle against the boss character, Apocalypse, who previously appeared in X-Men vs. Street Fighter. Upon defeating Apocalypse, the player battles the final boss character, Cyber-Akuma. The PlayStation version includes three exclusive game modes: Training, Hero Battle, and Cross Over. Hero Battle is an endurance mode which pits the player against the characters that they did not select. In Cross Over, the player and the computer opponent fight with the same team of characters; if the player is victorious, then the computer swaps one character from both teams. The PlayStation port also features a Gallery Mode containing promotional and character artwork, which are unlocked by completing various goals.

=== Playable characters ===
Marvel Super Heroes vs. Street Fighter features a roster of 17 playable fighters, with nine World Warriors from the Street Fighter universe and eight heroes from the Marvel Universe. All of the X-Men characters featured in X-Men vs. Street Fighter, with the exception of Cyclops and Wolverine, are replaced with characters from other Marvel Comics properties, such as Captain America, Spider-Man, and the Hulk. Most of the Street Fighter characters from the previous game return, with the exception of Cammy and Charlie (although Charlie is actually still in the game as a palette swapped secret character named "Shadow"), who are replaced by Dan and Sakura. In addition to the 17 immediately playable characters, the roster also contains six secret characters, all of which are palette swaps of existing fighters with different moveset properties.

The Japanese arcade and console versions of Marvel Super Heroes vs. Street Fighter include an exclusive character named Norimaro (憲磨呂(ノリマロ)). Norimaro is an original character created and owned by Japanese comedian Noritake Kinashi, who represents neither Marvel nor Capcom. Norimaro is not available in the international releases of the game due to licensing issues from Marvel as he did not align with their brand image and characters. Norimaro was restored for the Fighting Collection re-release of the game, making him playable outside of Japan.

==== Marvel characters ====
- Armor Spider-Man (Note: Secret character)
- Blackheart
- Captain America
- Cyclops
- Hulk
- Mephisto
- Omega Red
- Shuma-Gorath
- Spider-Man
- U.S. Agent
- Wolverine

==== Street Fighter characters ====
- Akuma
- Chun-Li
- Dan Hibiki
- Dark Sakura
- Dhalsim
- Ken Masters
- M. Bison
- Mech-Zangief
- Ryu
- Sakura Kasugano
- Shadow
- Zangief

== Development and release ==
As with X-Men vs. Street Fighter, Marvel Super Heroes vs. Street Fighter was initially developed for the CP System II arcade system board. The game debuted in Japanese and North American arcades in 1997. The game received a port to the Sega Saturn, exclusive to Japan, on October 22, 1998. The Sega Saturn port supported the 4MB RAM expansion peripheral, allowing the developers to create a conversion which retained the original frame rates and tag team system. The game was then ported to the PlayStation in February 1999. Due to the console's limited RAM capacity, the tag team format was switched to the more traditional round format used in other fighting game series, such as Street Fighter. To compensate for the removal of tag team gameplay, several new game modes, such as Hero Battle and Cross Over, were implemented.

According to former Capcom USA community manager and fighting game advisor Seth Killian, one of the primary goals for Marvel Super Heroes vs. Street Fighter was to "tone down the insanity" that occurred onscreen when compared to X-Men vs. Street Fighter. The developers also sought to achieve balance within the character roster; the previous title had gained a reputation for being "broken", with characters having access to one or more infinite combos. These changes, however, were met with negative reception from fans, who criticized the game for offering less freedom. This ultimately led to Capcom recognizing the theme of insanity as the hallmark of the series and using it as a focus for future Marvel vs. Capcom installments.

In June 2020, Marvel Super Heroes vs. Street Fighter was included in a home arcade cabinet from Arcade1Up alongside other games like X-Men vs. Street Fighter and Marvel vs. Capcom: Clash of Super Heroes. In June 2024, Capcom announced that Marvel Super Heroes vs. Street Fighter would be among the games included in the Marvel vs. Capcom Fighting Collection: Arcade Classics compilation, which was released the following September. The Fighting Collection version includes the ability for players to control Cyber-Akuma and Norimaro.

== Reception ==
Reception

Aggregate score
Aggregator	Score	
Aggregator	PS	Saturn
GameRankings	74%	77%

Review scores
Publication	Score	
Publication	PS	Saturn
AllGame	3/5	N/A
Game Informer	8/10	N/A
GamePro	4/5	N/A
GameRevolution	B−	N/A
GameSpot	5.7/10	7.3/10
IGN	7.5/10	N/A
Official U.S. PlayStation Magazine	3.5/5	N/A
PlayStation: The Official Magazine	3.5/5	N/A

In Japan, Game Machine listed Marvel Super Heroes vs. Street Fighter as the third most successful arcade game of August 1997.

The Sega Saturn version of Marvel Super Heroes vs. Street Fighter received "favorable" reviews, while the PlayStation version received "average" reviews, according to the review aggregation website GameRankings. Jeff Gerstmann of GameSpot praised the Saturn port for its gameplay, character roster, graphics, sprite animations, and additional RAM support, labeling it an "arcade-perfect conversion". However, Gerstmann faulted the game for being a "near-carbon copy" of X-Men vs. Street Fighter. While the PlayStation port also received praise for its gameplay and character roster, it attracted numerous criticisms, many of which stemmed from issues related to the console's memory restrictions. GameSpot, IGN, and GameRevolution all reprimanded the game for removing the original version's tag team-based gameplay. Randy Nelson of IGN stated that the lack of tag team fights negated one of the major elements that made Capcom's Vs. series stand apart, resulting in a game that was "nothing truly special or different". Ryan MacDonald of GameSpot expressed disappointment over the port's lower graphical quality and cut animation frames. Game Informer also complained about experiencing instances of slowdown. However, despite the criticisms, reviewers claimed the game as an improvement over the critically panned PlayStation port of X-Men vs. Street Fighter.

== Sequel ==
A sequel to Marvel Super Heroes vs. Street Fighter, titled Marvel vs. Capcom: Clash of Super Heroes, was released for arcades in Japan and North America in 1998. The game expands its character roster beyond the Street Fighter series to include other Capcom video game franchises, such as Darkstalkers and Mega Man. While its gameplay remains similar, Clash of Super Heroes removes the "Variable Assist" feature in favor of a new system. It was ported to the Dreamcast and PlayStation in 1999 and 2000 respectively. A high-definition version of the game was also released in 2012 for the PlayStation 3 and Xbox 360 as part of the Marvel vs. Capcom Origins compilation.
