= Marvel vs. Capcom: Clash of Super Heroes =

1998 video game

- Japanese Dreamcast box art
- Developer: Capcom
- Publishers: Capcom; Dreamcast, PlayStation: JP/NA: Capcom; PAL: Virgin Interactive Entertainment
- Producer: Kenji Kataoka
- Designers: Atsushi Tomita; Nakano Tau Masahiro; Yuji Matsumoto
- Artist: CRMK
- Composers: Masato Kouda; Yuko Takehara
- Series: Marvel vs. Capcom
- Platforms: Arcade, Dreamcast, PlayStation
- Release: Arcade: JP: February 1998; NA: March 1998; Dreamcast: JP: March 25, 1999; NA: October 7, 1999; EU: November 24, 1999; PlayStation: JP: November 11, 1999; NA: January 27, 2000; EU: January 31, 2000
- Genre: Fighting
- Modes: Single-player, multiplayer
- Arcade system: CP System II

Marvel vs. Capcom: Clash of Super Heroes (Note: Japanese: マーヴル VS. カプコン クラッシュ オブ スーパー ヒーローズ, Hepburn: Māvuru bāsasu Kapukon: Kurasshu obu Sūpā Hīrōzu) is a 1998 crossover fighting game developed and published by Capcom for the CP System II arcade system. It is the third installment in the Marvel vs. Capcom series, which features characters from Capcom's video game franchises and characters from Marvel Comics. Unlike the series' previous entry, Marvel Super Heroes vs. Street Fighter (1997), this sequel features characters from numerous Capcom video game franchises, rather than strictly Street Fighter characters. While the gameplay is largely identical to its predecessor, Clash of Super Heroes removes the traditional character assist system and introduces the "Variable Cross" attack.

The game was ported to the Dreamcast and PlayStation in 1999, and re-released in 2012 for the PlayStation 3 and Xbox 360 as part of the Marvel vs. Capcom Origins collection and in 2024 for Nintendo Switch, PlayStation 4 and Windows as part of the Marvel vs. Capcom Fighting Collection: Arcade Classics compilation. The Dreamcast version of the game was praised for its visuals, gameplay, and translation of the original arcade experience. For the PlayStation version, Capcom removed tag team battles due to the console's limited RAM capacity in an attempt to preserve the main game's speed and graphical integrity. Consequently, the PlayStation port received slightly less positive reviews than the Dreamcast version. The game was followed by Marvel vs. Capcom 2: New Age of Heroes in 2000.

== Gameplay ==
Capcom's Mega Man attacks Marvel Comics' Captain America. The remaining number of times each player can summon their guest character is displayed below each team's life gauge.

Marvel vs. Capcom: Clash of Super Heroes is the third entry in the Marvel vs. Capcom series of 2D fighting games. The game utilizes similar tag team-based game mechanics to its predecessor, Marvel Super Heroes vs. Street Fighter. Before starting each match, the player selects a team of two fighters to compete in one-on-one combat. The player is free to swap between their characters at any point during battle. While one character fights, their teammate resting off-screen slowly regenerates their life gauge. The first team to exhaust their opponent's vitality wins the match; however, if the timer runs out before either team is knocked out, the player with the most remaining health is declared the winner.

Clash of Super Heroes features two significant gameplay changes from Marvel Super Heroes vs. Street Fighter. The game removes the "Variable Assist" feature used in the previous installment, which allows the player to summon their offscreen teammate to perform a special attack, in favor of the "Guest Character/Special Partner" system. While similar in function, guest characters are randomly allocated to each player at the beginning of a match. They are also limited to a few uses per round. Clash of Super Heroes introduces a new technique called the "Variable Cross", also known as a "Duo Team Attack". When executing a Variable Cross, the player can attack their opponent with both characters simultaneously for a limited time. In addition, the player is given unlimited use of the "Hyper Combo Gauge", a colored meter towards the bottom of the screen which allows the player to perform several special techniques, allowing them to pull off multiple Hyper Combo moves, which deliver heavy damage to the opponent, in quick succession.

=== Modes ===
The Dreamcast version of Marvel vs. Capcom: Clash of Super Heroes includes five game modes: Arcade, Versus, Training, Survival, and Cross Fever. In Arcade Mode, the player must defeat several artificial intelligence-controlled teams to reach the final boss character, Onslaught, the central character of the "Onslaught" crossover story which ran through all of Marvel Comics's ongoing series a year before Marvel vs. Capcom was released. Upon completion, the player views a cinematic ending unique to each playable fighter. In Versus Mode, two players can choose their characters, handicap level, and stages before competing against each other in battle locally. The player can practice moves and combos in Training Mode, where they can also adjust certain settings, such as AI difficulty, and the number of bars available in the Hyper Combo Gauge. In Survival Mode, the player fights through waves of enemies with a time limit; in addition, the player's life gauge is carried over through each round. Cross Fever Mode allows four players to simultaneously compete in a two-on-two match. In place of Cross Fever, the PlayStation version features an exclusive mode called Cross Over. Cross Over is the only mode in the PlayStation port that permits tag team gameplay, which was removed due to the console's limited RAM capacity.

=== Playable characters ===
Marvel vs. Capcom: Clash of Super Heroes features a roster of 15 regular fighters. Unlike Marvel Super Heroes vs. Street Fighter, which limited itself to characters from the Street Fighter series, Clash of Super Heroes uses characters from other Capcom video game franchises, such as Darkstalkers, Mega Man, and Strider. The roster also contains six secret characters, which are accessed by inputting codes on the character select screen. Most of the secret characters are palette swaps of existing fighters with different moveset properties, such as Shadow Lady, a modified version of Chun-Li. The sole exception to this trend is Roll from the Mega Man series, who has unique sprites, but mostly shares the same moves as Mega Man.

The game features 22 "Special Partner" characters (including two that are hidden), drawn from the Marvel and Capcom universes, which can be called forth during battle for support. Partner characters from Marvel Comics include Colossus, Cyclops, and Jubilee, while the Capcom side includes Arthur from Ghosts 'n Goblins, Devilotte from Cyberbots: Fullmetal Madness, and the Unknown Soldier from Forgotten Worlds.

==== Marvel playable characters ====
- Captain America
- Gambit
- High Speed Venom (Note: Secret character)
- Hulk
- Hulk (Marvel Super Heroes Version)
- Hyper Armor War Machine
- Spider-Man
- Venom
- War Machine
- Wolverine

==== Marvel assist characters ====
- Colossus
- Cyclops
- Iceman
- Jubilee
- Juggernaut
- Magneto
- Psylocke
- Rogue
- Sentinel
- Storm
- Thor
- U.S. Agent

==== Capcom playable characters ====
- Captain Commando
- Chun-Li
- Jin Saotome
- Mega Man
- Morrigan Aensland
- Morrigan (Lilith)
- Roll
- Ryu
- Shadow Lady
- Strider Hiryu
- Zangief

==== Capcom assist characters ====
- Anita (from the Darkstalkers series)
- Arthur (from the Ghosts 'n Goblins series)
- Devilotte (from Cyberbots: Fullmetal Madness)
- Lou (from Three Wonders)
- Michelle Heart (from Legendary Wings)
- Pur & Fur (from Adventure Quiz: Capcom World 2)
- Saki (from Quiz Nanairo Dreams)
- Shadow
- Ton Pooh (from the Strider series)
- Unknown Soldier (from Forgotten Worlds)

== Development and release ==
Marvel vs. Capcom: Clash of Super Heroes was originally developed for the CP System II arcade system board. It was exhibited at the AOU Show in February 1998 before being released in Japanese arcades that month, followed by North America in March 1998.

A direct Dreamcast port was revealed by the Computer Entertainment Software Association at the 1999 Tokyo Game Show. The Dreamcast version added the game mode Cross Fever, which permits four-player gameplay. The port was released on March 25, 1999 in Japan, on October 7 in North America, and on June 23, 2000 in Europe, where it was published by Capcom's usual European publisher, Virgin Interactive Entertainment.

The game also received a PlayStation port. The PlayStation's RAM limitations required the developer to remove certain features, most notably the game's tag team element; thus, most game modes were restricted to two-character battles, instead of four. This reduced the player's secondary character to an assist role, similar to guest characters. A new gameplay mode called Cross Over allows tag team play by forcing the players to fight with identical teams. For example, if Player 1 chooses Spider-Man and Player 2 chooses Ryu, then Ryu and Spider-Man would automatically be selected as Player 1 and Player 2's secondary characters, respectively. The game also added an art gallery, where players can view game art and ending animations. Many frames of animation were also omitted as a result of insufficient RAM, particularly in larger character sprites. The PlayStation port was released on November 11, 1999 in Japan, where it was renamed Marvel vs. Capcom: Clash of Super Heroes EX Edition, and in January 2000 in North America and Europe.

A high-definition version of the game was released, alongside Marvel Super Heroes, as part of the Marvel vs. Capcom Origins collection. Built using the arcade ROM, the compilation sought to maintain the original's gameplay experience, while adding new features such as online multiplayer, challenges, and replay saving. It was released through the PlayStation Network on September 25 in North America and October 10, 2012 in Europe. The Xbox Live Arcade version was released worldwide on September 26. Following the apparent expiration of Capcom's licensing contracts with Marvel Comics in 2013, Marvel vs. Capcom Origins was removed from online stores in December 2014.

In June 2020, Clash of Super Heroes was re-released as a home arcade cabinet by Arcade1Up, which also included Marvel Super Heroes vs. Street Fighter, X-Men vs. Street Fighter, and Marvel Super Heroes in War of the Gems. In June 2024, Capcom announced that Clash of Super Heroes would be among the games included in the Marvel vs. Capcom Fighting Collection: Arcade Classics compilation, which was released the following September.

=== Marketing ===
Toy Biz produced a line of action figures to help promote the game, which consisted of four two-packs, each of which featured one Marvel character and one Capcom character. The two-packs consisted of Captain America and Morrigan, War Machine and Mega Man, Spider-Man and Strider Hiryu and Venom and Captain Commando.

== Reception ==
Reception

Aggregate score
| Aggregator | Score | |
| Aggregator | Dreamcast | PS |
|---|---|---|
| GameRankings | 80% | 75% |

Review scores
| Publication | Score | |
| Publication | Dreamcast | PS |
|---|---|---|
| AllGame | 3/5 | 2.5/5 |
| Edge | 7/10 | N/A |
| Electronic Gaming Monthly | 7.875/10 | 6.5/10 |
| Eurogamer | 8/10 | N/A |
| Famitsu | 33/40 | N/A |
| Game Informer | 7.5/10 | N/A |
| GameFan | 92% | 71% |
| GamePro | 5/5 | 5/5 |
| GameRevolution | B | N/A |
| GameSpot | 9/10 | 5.8/10 |
| GameSpy | 7.5/10 | N/A |
| IGN | 8.8/10 | 7.5/10 |
| Official U.S. PlayStation Magazine | N/A | 2.5/5 |

In Japan, Game Machine listed Marvel vs. Capcom: Clash of Super Heroes as the second most successful arcade game of March 1998. In the United States, the game sold an estimated 3,000 arcade units, reportedly outperforming Street Fighter III (1997) to become Capcom's most successful arcade game in the US during that period. Marvel vs. Capcom: Clash of Super Heroes received "favorable" reviews on both Dreamcast and PlayStation, according to the review aggregation website GameRankings.

The Dreamcast port of Marvel vs. Capcom: Clash of Super Heroes received positive reviews for its animation quality and fast gameplay. Game Informer lauded the game for its "seamless animation, in-your-face effects, and lightning-quick gameplay". In addition, the magazine praised the Dreamcast version for being a "flawless" translation of the original arcade version. Jeff Gerstmann of GameSpot also praised the visuals and combat, stating that it was "everything you'd expect from an over-the-top, ultra-flashy fighter". GameRevolution, on the other hand, felt that Clash of Super Heroes lacked depth. The site criticized the Dreamcast port for not adding any significantly new features from the arcade version. In Japan, Famitsu gave it a score of 33 out of 40.

The PlayStation port received a bit more mixed reviews than its Dreamcast counterpart. Gerstmann heavily faulted the game for its removal of tag team battles. He claimed that while it had "the same moves as the original game...the shell surrounding those moves [was] completely different". Douglass C. Perry of IGN labeled the PlayStation version as "an average game", praising its gameplay and lasting appeal, while criticizing its selection of fighting styles and soundtrack. GamePro praised the developer for making the decision to remove features in order to keep the speed and graphical integrity of the game without overloading the system; however, they still recommended the Dreamcast version over it.

== Sequel ==
A sequel to Marvel vs. Capcom: Clash of Super Heroes was announced by Capcom on December 1, 1999. The game, titled Marvel vs. Capcom 2: New Age of Heroes, was initially developed for the Sega NAOMI arcade board, marking Capcom's first attempt at a fighting game outside of the CP System II and III hardware systems. It features several significant gameplay changes from Clash of Super Heroes, such as three-on-three tag team battles, a new character assist system, and a more simplified control scheme. Marvel vs. Capcom 2 also includes a roster of 56 playable fighters, drawing numerous character sprites from Capcom's previous Marvel-licensed fighting games. Following its release in Japanese arcades in 2000, the game received ports to the Dreamcast, PlayStation 2, PlayStation 3, Xbox, Xbox 360, and iOS devices over the course of twelve years.
