= Dora Saker =

British cheese maker and instructor

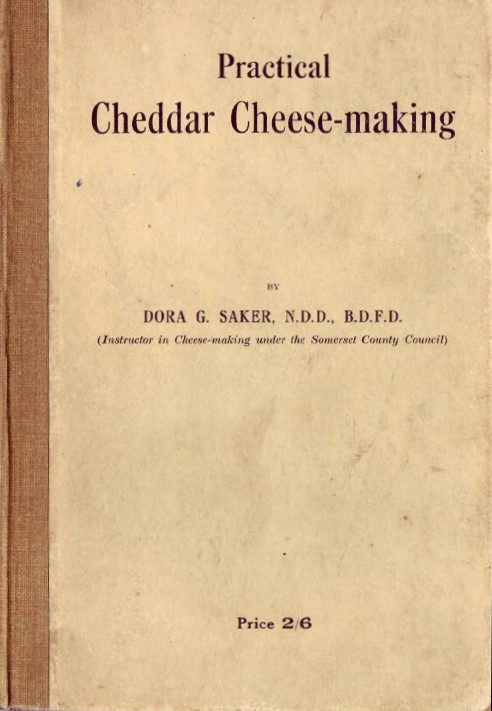
Practical Cheddar Cheese-making, Dora Saker, 1917

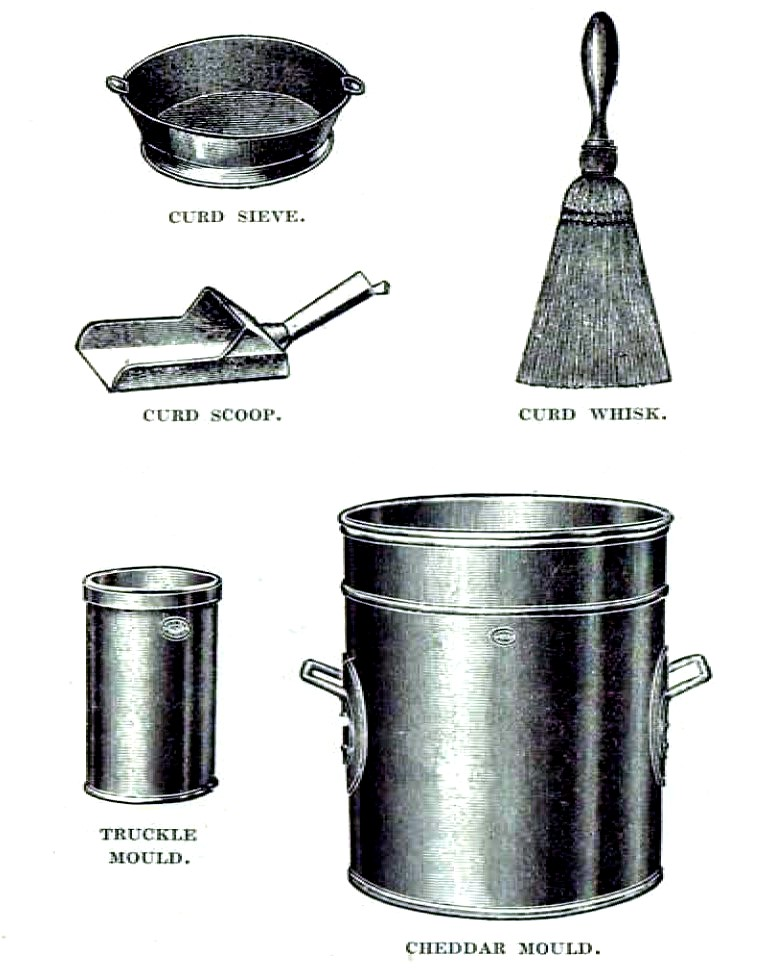
Cheese-making equipment illustrated in Saker's 1917 book

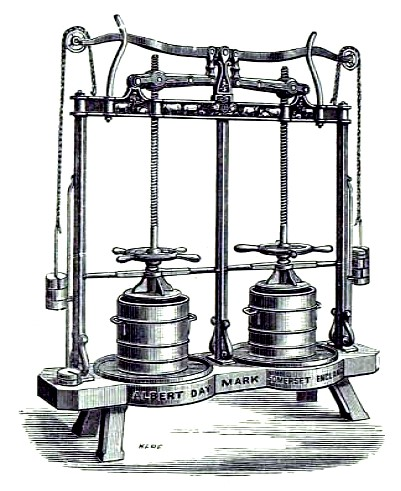
A cheese press made by Albert Day of Mark, Somerset, as illustrated in Saker's book

Dora Glover Saker (1888 – 1 July 1926) was an instructor in cheese-making for Somerset County Council. The rediscovery of her book, Practical Cheddar Cheese-making (1917), by cheese-makers in the twenty-first century has been credited with inspiring a revival of interest in historic cheese-making methods and to have "quickly acquired cult status amongst farmhouse cheese-makers".

== Early life ==
Dora Saker was born in Redhill, Surrey, England, in 1888, to Richard Webb Saker, a solicitor's clerk, and his wife Hannah C. Saker. She had two sisters and two brothers.

== Career ==
Bronwen Percival and Randolph Hodgson describe Saker as working during a period when methods of dairy production were becoming more scientific with farmers, colleges and instructors co-operating to ensure that local cheese producers were able to make a consistently high-quality product.

In 1908 Saker passed the examinations of the National Agricultural Examination Board and was awarded the National Diploma in Dairying (NDD). She also acquired the British Dairy Farmers' Diploma (BDFD). She was appointed as an instructor in cheese-making for Somerset County Council, and in 1917 published her first book, Practical Cheddar Cheese-making which emphasised the importance of good hygiene and the correct alignment of acidification with moisture loss in the production process. She advocated farmhouse over factory production, as in her view, the former allowed a better control to be kept over the quality of the ingredients and the cheese-making process.

In 1919 she was appointed cheese examiner at Chelmsford, and in 1920 she was appointed examiner in cheese-making at the examinations of the British Dairy Farmers Association in Reading. In that year she held the position of Superintendent of Dairy Poultry and Domestic Science to the Somerset Agricultural Instruction Committee. In 1921 she published her second book, Practical Dairying, in Methuen's Handbooks of Agriculture series. In 1923 she travelled to New York on the ship Celtic.

== Death and legacy ==
Saker died at a hospital in Bridgwater, Somerset, on 1 July 1926. Her residence was recorded as The Somerset Farm Institute, Cannington, Bridgwater. She left an estate of £1,575. Probate was granted to her sisters Margaret May Saker and Ida Marion Saker.

Saker's book on Cheddar cheese-making was rediscovered in the early twenty-first century and has been credited with inspiring a revival of interest in historic cheese-making methods. According to Percival and Hodgson, the book has "quickly acquired cult status amongst farmhouse cheese-makers," but they caution against seeing her advice as the rediscovery of a lost traditional way of cheese-making, arguing that there is no such thing and that Saker was actually very progressive in her views and seeking to improve the quality of the product through the application of scientific techniques.

== Selected publications ==
- Practical Cheddar Cheese-making. Dora Saker, Harpenden, 1917.
- Practical Dairying. Methuen, London, 1921.
