= X-Men vs. Street Fighter =

1996 video game

- Arcade flyer
- Developer: Capcom
- Publishers: Capcom; PlayStation: JP/NA: Capcom; PAL: Virgin Interactive Entertainment
- Producer: Tetsuya Iijima
- Composers: Yuki Iwai; Yuko Takehara
- Series: Marvel vs. Capcom; Street Fighter
- Platforms: Arcade, Sega Saturn, PlayStation
- Release: Arcade: JP: September 1996; NA: October 1996; EU: 1996; Saturn: JP: November 27, 1997; PlayStation: JP: February 26, 1998; NA: June 11, 1998; AU: September 24, 1998; EU: November 6, 1998
- Genre: Fighting
- Modes: Single-player, multiplayer
- Arcade system: CP System II

X-Men vs. Street Fighter (Note: Japanese: エックスメン VS. ストリートファイター, Hepburn: Ekkusu Men bāsasu Sutorīto Faitā) is a 1996 crossover fighting game developed and published by Capcom. It is Capcom's third fighting game to feature Marvel Comics characters, following X-Men: Children of the Atom (1994) and Marvel Super Heroes (1995), and the first installment in the Marvel vs. Capcom series. As the title suggests, the game includes characters from Marvel's X-Men franchise and the cast from Capcom's Street Fighter series. Originally released for arcades in 1996, it was ported to the Sega Saturn in 1997 and the PlayStation in 1998. The original arcade version is included in the compilation Marvel vs. Capcom Fighting Collection: Arcade Classics, released for the Nintendo Switch, PlayStation 4 and Windows in 2024.

X-Men vs. Street Fighter features gameplay similar to Street Fighter, but incorporates dual-character selection and tag team-based combat. Each player selects two characters to compete in a one-on-one battle, attempting to defeat the opposing team. The players are given the ability to switch between their characters at any point during the match. The game also incorporates numerous elements from X-Men: Children of the Atom and Marvel Super Heroes.

The game was released to generally positive reviews, with critics praising its gameplay and sprite animation quality. While the Sega Saturn port received praise for maintaining the experience of the original arcade version, the PlayStation port was met with mixed to negative critical reception for removing several features, such as tag team battles. The changes were done in response to the technical limitations of the PlayStation. The game was followed by Marvel Super Heroes vs. Street Fighter in 1997.

== Gameplay ==
Magneto attacks M. Bison, while their respective teammates, Juggernaut and Chun-Li, await off-screen. Players can choose to tag in their secondary character at any given point.

Similar to Capcom's various Street Fighter titles, X-Men vs. Street Fighter is a 2D fighting game in which players control various characters to engage in one-on-one combat, attempting to knock out the opponent by depleting their health. It is the first formal installment in the Marvel vs. Capcom series and features dual-character selection and tag team battles. Instead of the typical best-of-three round format, matches consist of a single round. Players select two characters at the beginning of a match, each sporting their own life gauge. Players control one character at a time, while the other awaits off-screen. The starting character can tag in the off-screen character at any time during the fight. The dormant character will also slowly recover a portion of their vitality while the current character is fighting. If one character loses all of their vitality, then the tag partner will automatically come into play. The match continues until both characters on either team are defeated. If the timer runs out before either team is knocked out, then the player with the most combined remaining health is declared the winner.

The game borrows numerous gameplay conventions from Capcom's previous Marvel-licensed ventures, X-Men: Children of the Atom and Marvel Super Heroes, such as the "Super Jump", the ability to jump higher than normal, and "Aerial Rave", the ability to perform combos on the opponent while in the air. X-Men vs. Street Fighter also includes a meter system similar to the two aforementioned games called the "Hyper Combo Gauge". As characters perform moves and receive damage, the players' Hyper Combo Gauges will gradually fill. Players can expend their meter to perform various special techniques, such as the "Hyper Combo", which unleashes high amounts of damage; "Variable Combination", where both characters use their Hyper Combos simultaneously; and "Variable Counter", which transforms a defensive block into an offensive counterattack by tagging in the off-screen character.

=== Modes ===
The arcade, Sega Saturn, and PlayStation versions of X-Men vs. Street Fighter all include Arcade Mode and Versus Mode. In Arcade Mode, the player fights several artificial intelligence-controlled teams before competing in a final battle against the boss character, Apocalypse, an antagonist from the X-Men series. In Versus Mode, two players can fight against each other locally. The PlayStation port also features Training Mode, where players can practice moves and combos against non-aggressive computer opponents, and Survival Mode, where players fight against endless waves of teams.

== Playable characters ==
X-Men vs. Street Fighter features a roster of 17 playable characters. The character sprites for the X-Men characters were drawn from X-Men: Children of the Atom, with the exception of Rogue, Gambit, and Sabretooth, who had not appeared in a previous Capcom fighting game. The sprite designs themselves are based on the characters' appearances from the 1990s animated X-Men television series, complete with the original voice actors. The Street Fighter character sprites are reused from Street Fighter Alpha 2. Similar to his secret guest appearance in Children of the Atom, Akuma appears as a hidden character in X-Men vs. Street Fighter. In order to create a level playing field between the cast of Street Fighter and the X-Men series' superheroes and supervillains, the Street Fighter characters were re-imagined with highly exaggerated versions of their special moves. For example, Ryu comes equipped with a "super Hadouken" that fills the entire screen.

=== X-Men characters ===
- Cyclops
- Gambit
- Juggernaut
- Magneto
- Rogue
- Sabretooth
- Storm
- Wolverine

=== Street Fighter characters ===
- Akuma
- Cammy
- Charlie Nash
- Chun-Li
- Dhalsim
- Ken Masters
- M. Bison
- Ryu
- Zangief

== Development and release ==
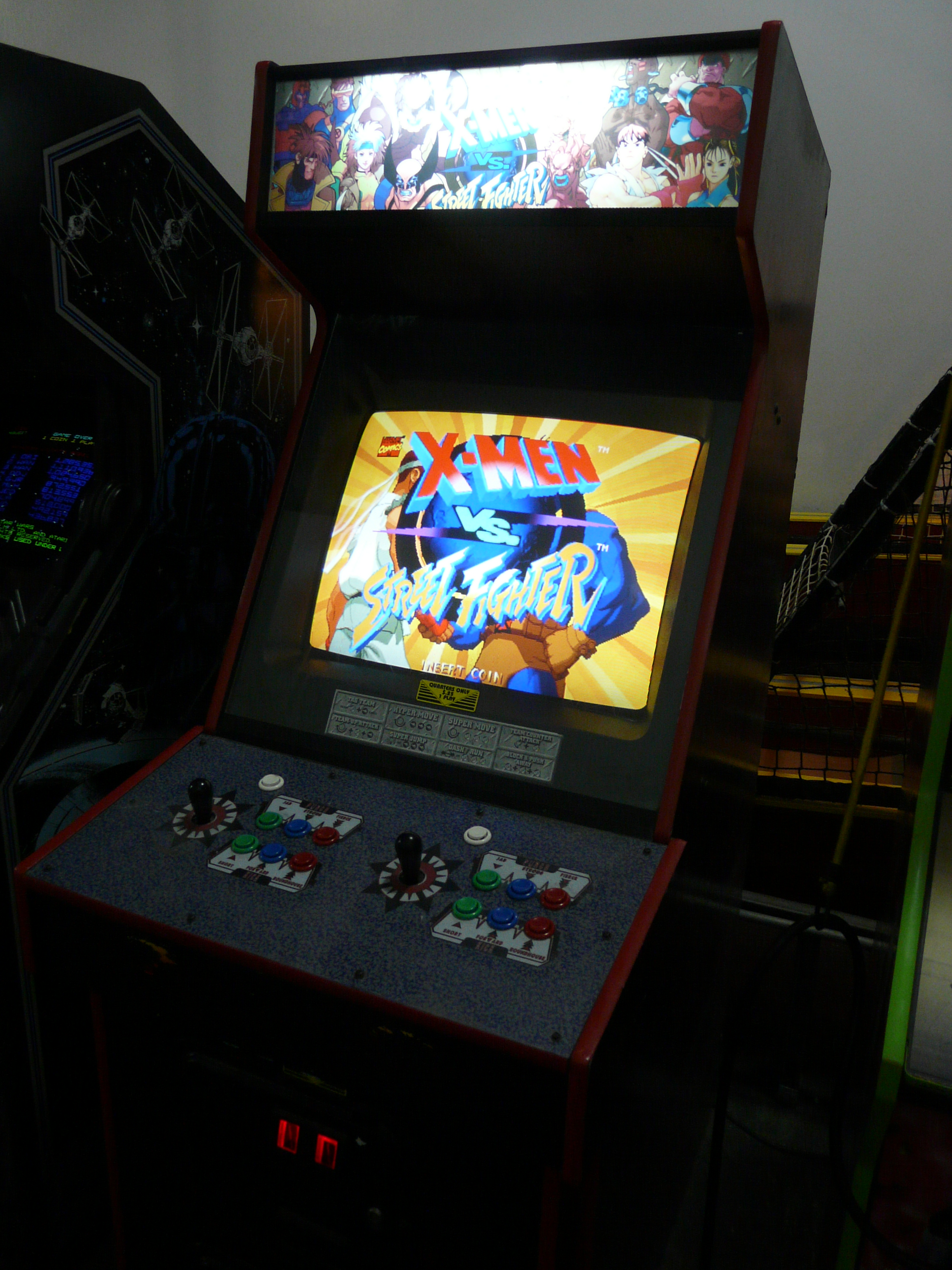
An X-Men vs. Street Fighter arcade cabinet, 2009.

X-Men vs. Street Fighter debuted in Japan in September 1996 for the CP System II arcade board, and was released worldwide later on in 1996. The game received a port to the Sega Saturn in Japan on November 27, 1997. The port was the first game announced to support the Saturn's 4MB RAM cartridge. It utilized the cartridge peripheral, which was packaged alongside the game, to deliver an arcade-perfect conversion. Though Capcom USA said the game would eventually come out in the U.S., Sega's decision not to manufacture the requisite 4 MB RAM cartridge in the U.S. presented a major obstacle to the game's release there. Additionally, several major U.S. retailers announced that they would be clearing out all Saturn hardware and software inventory in the second quarter of 1998, casting doubt on whether Capcom could get X-Men Vs. Street Fighter onto retailer shelves if they went ahead with the release. Ultimately, the Saturn version was never officially released in North America. An imported version was sold at certain Electronics Boutique locations.

Capcom's usual European publisher, Virgin Interactive, were reluctant to release any of Capcom's Saturn games using the 4 MB cartridge due to the prohibitive costs of manufacturing the cartridge. Sega licensed the game from Capcom, intending to release it in Europe bundled with the expansion cartridge; however, these plans were eventually shelved.

On November 6, 1996, Capcom announced during a press conference that the home version of X-Men vs. Street Fighter would be exclusive to the Saturn. Facing ongoing accusations of favoritism towards the Saturn (due to the perceived superiority of the Saturn version of Street Fighter Alpha 2 over the PlayStation version, and the home version of Night Warriors: Darkstalkers' Revenge being Saturn exclusive), Capcom later rescinded this announcement, stating instead that PlayStation and Saturn versions of X-Men vs. Street Fighter would be released simultaneously and would both be arcade-perfect. However, the PlayStation version was not released until February 26, 1998, in Japan, where it was renamed X-Men vs. Street Fighter: EX Edition. The PlayStation port was also released in North America on June 11, 1998, and Europe in November 1998.

Moreover, due to the memory limitations of the PlayStation, both the graphics and gameplay of the port were altered. Several frames of character sprite animations were removed to reduce the amount of RAM usage. Most notably, the tag team combat was omitted. Instead of being able to switch between characters at will, the second character only comes into play during certain attacks, such as Variable Combinations and Variable Counters. In addition, the one-round battles used in the arcade and Sega Saturn versions were extended to a two-out-of-three round setup. The PlayStation version includes a code that allows players to compete in "pseudo-tag team matches", provided that each player uses their opponent's starting character as their partner. For example, if Player 1 is controlling Ryu and Player 2 is controlling Wolverine, then Player 1's partner will be Wolverine and Player 2's partner will be Ryu. The Hyper Combo Gauge also requires roughly half as many hits to fill as it does in the arcade and Saturn versions, enabling more frequent combos. The PlayStation version has training and survival modes, neither of which are included in other versions of the game.

In June 2020, it was announced that X-Men vs. Street Fighter would be included in home arcade cabinets from Arcade1Up alongside other games like Marvel Super Heroes vs. Street Fighter and Marvel vs. Capcom: Clash of Super Heroes. In June 2024, Capcom announced that X-Men vs. Street Fighter would be among the games included in the Marvel vs. Capcom Fighting Collection: Arcade Classics compilation, which was released the following September.

== Reception ==
Reception

Aggregate score
Aggregator	Score	
Aggregator	PS	Saturn
GameRankings	64%	N/A

Review scores
Publication	Score	
Publication	PS	Saturn
AllGame	2.5/5	4/5
Computer and Video Games	5/10	9/10
Edge	N/A	9/10
Electronic Gaming Monthly	4.625/10	N/A
Game Informer	7.5/10	9.25/10
GameRevolution	C+	N/A
GameSpot	3.6/10	7.4/10
IGN	6/10	N/A
Next Generation	1/5	4/5
Sega Saturn Magazine	N/A	94%

In Japan, Game Machine listed X-Men vs. Street Fighter as the most successful arcade game of October 1996, outperforming titles such as Quiz Nanairo Dreams and Stakes Winner 2. The game was only mildly popular when first released in North American arcades, but after several months it caught on and became a hit. A reviewer for Next Generation scored the arcade version three out of five stars. He complimented the tag team mechanic and noted that the game continued the inflation of explosive projectiles and lengthy combos from Capcom's previous 2D fighters, but felt this breed of game had been milked out, concluding, "X-Men Vs. Street Fighter is a fun game, but it's just a bit of an overdose of the kind of game of which we've already played way too much." In a retrospective review, AllGame gave it a score of four stars out of five, praising its combination of two of the most popular franchises of its era and its tag team mechanic.

A number of U.S. publications reviewed the Saturn version as an import. Reviewers praised the Saturn edition's close recreation of the original arcade version, particularly the animation and sound quality, fast loading times, and absence of slowdown. Jeff Gerstmann of GameSpot commended the character sprite animations and background details, claiming that "there is no better looking 2D fighter on any console system". While Gerstmann also praised the port for its fast loading times and lack of slowdown, he criticized the game for its defense-oriented gameplay and recycling of the Street Fighter music themes. Game Informer lauded the port for running and looking identical to its arcade counterpart, declaring it "one of the best arcade conversions ever seen to date." Next Generation focused all its praises on the requisite 4 MB RAM cart, viewing the performance improvement resulting from a simple increase in RAM as a foretaste of the possibilities of the next generation of consoles. GamePro was pleased by the tag team feature, responsive controls, and accurate arcade conversion, though they remarked that "the gameplay at times relies more on flash than actual skill." They gave it a 4.5 out of 5 for graphics and a perfect 5.0 in every other category (sound, control, and fun factor), calling it "one of the most fun fighting games ever to hit the home market." Rich Leadbetter, reviewing the later cancelled European edition of the Saturn port for the British Sega Saturn Magazine, criticized the lack of PAL optimization and compared the game unfavorably to its predecessor Marvel Super Heroes, saying the selection of characters is less exciting and the lack of console-exclusive modes is conspicuous. However, he acknowledged that X-Men vs. Street Fighter is a much more accurate conversion of its arcade counterpart, and concluded it to be outstanding in absolute terms.

The PlayStation version, on the other hand, received mixed reviews, holding a 64% on the review aggregation website GameRankings. Many reviewers' critiques were centered on the port's various changes as a result of the PlayStation's technical restraints. Electronic Gaming Monthly, GameSpot, Next Generation, GamePro, and Game Revolution all lambasted the port for its removal of tag team battles (which they regarded as X-Men vs. Street Fighter's defining feature) and extremely frequent slowdown. Reviews also criticized the low frame rate and noticeable decline in animation quality. Jeff Gerstmann, again reviewing the game for GameSpot, argued that Capcom should never have released X-Men vs. Street Fighter for the PlayStation, since it clearly could not handle a decent conversion. While Game Informer and IGN shared many of the same criticisms, both maintained that, while the PlayStation port paled in comparison to the Sega Saturn version, it was still a solid fighting game. GamePro said it was "worth a cautionary rental at best", arguing that the slowdown is not only frequent but dramatic enough to throw off the player's timing, making the port not fun to play. They gave it a 3.0 out of 5 for control, 2.0 for fun factor, 4.0 for sound, and 2.5 for graphics. Electronic Gaming Monthly's four-person review team was split: Dan Hsu and Shawn Smith both said that while the conversion is so terrible that anyone who had played the arcade or Saturn versions would have a hard time enjoying it, it was decent fun on its own merits, while John Ricciardi and Sushi-X both agreed with GamePro that the slowdown kills any enjoyment of the game. Next Generation stated that "If you've never seen a Capcom fighting game before, this might be fun for a few minutes, but there is not one single positive thing to be said for the trade-offs that Capcom made to get this game to PlayStation. Ouch."

== Sequel ==
A sequel to X-Men vs. Street Fighter was released by Capcom in 1997. Marvel Super Heroes vs. Street Fighter, while similar in terms of gameplay and art style, replaces a majority of the X-Men cast with characters from other Marvel Comics properties, such as Captain America and Spider-Man. The game is notable for introducing "assists" into the Marvel vs. Capcom series, which allow players to summon their off-screen character to perform an attack during battle. Like X-Men vs. Street Fighter, the game was ported to the Sega Saturn and PlayStation, which were released in 1998 and 1999, respectively.
