= Marvel vs. Capcom Origins =

2012 video game compilation

- Cover art by Whilce Portacio
- Developer: Iron Galaxy Studios
- Publisher: Capcom
- Producer: Derek Neal
- Series: Marvel vs. Capcom
- Platforms: PlayStation 3, Xbox 360
- Release: PlayStation 3: NA: September 25, 2012; EU: October 10, 2012; Xbox 360: WW: September 26, 2012
- Genre: Fighting
- Modes: Single-player, Multiplayer

Marvel vs. Capcom Origins is a 2012 video game compilation developed by Iron Galaxy Studios and published by Capcom for the PlayStation 3 (via PlayStation Network) and Xbox 360 (via Xbox Live Arcade). It consists of Marvel Super Heroes (1995) and Marvel vs. Capcom: Clash of Super Heroes (1998), two crossover fighting games in the Marvel vs. Capcom series.

The compilation, which was developed using Marvel Super Heroes' and Clash of Super Heroes' arcade ROMs, aimed to maintain the integrity of their original releases. As such, no changes were made to gameplay mechanics or character balance. Origins introduces high-definition visuals with multiple options for filters and viewing angles. It implements GGPO-enhanced online multiplayer with player lobbies, spectating, and replay saving. It also incorporates a challenge system that awards points used to unlock concept art, secret characters, and other content.

Origins was met with mixed to positive reviews upon release. Critics praised the game for remaining faithful to the arcade versions and its additional features but criticized it by some for its outdated gameplay and unbalanced rosters. In December 2014, the game was removed from its online platforms after Capcom's licensing contracts with Marvel Comics expired. A similar compilation title, Marvel vs. Capcom Fighting Collection: Arcade Classics, was released in 2024.

== Gameplay ==
A gameplay screenshot from Marvel vs. Capcom Origins illustrating the "over the shoulder" viewing filter designed to emulate an authentic arcade experience

Marvel vs. Capcom Origins is a compilation game that includes two 1990s Capcom titles, Marvel Super Heroes (1995) and Marvel vs. Capcom: Clash of Super Heroes (1998), whose gameplay remain identical to their arcade releases. Origins retains each game's original single-player game modes and introduces online multiplayer. The online infrastructure utilizes GGPO, a networking library designed to minimize input lag. In addition to ranked and player matches, the online mode adds eight-player lobbies, spectator mode, and replay saving. The matchmaking system allows players to adjust certain settings to narrow down search results, such as establishing ping thresholds and regional preferences.

Origins features high-definition visuals with multiple options available for filters, frames, and scan lines. Players can play both games in their original states or apply filters to smooth the graphics and character sprites. The screen ratio can be adjusted to the standard-definition 4:3 aspect ratio or stretched for high-definition televisions. It also offers different viewing angles for gameplay, such as an "over the shoulder" view. Lastly, Origins includes an in-game challenge system. These challenges, which can range from throwing a certain number of projectiles to winning online matches, reward points upon completion that can be used to unlock bonus content from the "Vault", including concept art, short films, and secret characters.

== Development and release ==
Marvel vs. Capcom Origins was announced by Capcom on July 5, 2012. The game was developed by Iron Galaxy Studios, who had previously worked with Capcom on Street Fighter III: 3rd Strike Online Edition. A playable demo of the game was present during the Evolution Championship Series from July 6–8, 2012, and San Diego Comic-Con from July 12–15, 2012. According to Producer Derek Neal, Iron Galaxy Studios used the original arcade ROMs from Marvel Super Heroes and Marvel vs. Capcom: Clash of Super Heroes to create the game. The balance of the characters was deliberately left unchanged in order to remain faithful to the arcade versions. Origins was built upon a similar framework to Street Fighter III: 3rd Strike Online Edition, which had also included online play using GGPO, upgraded graphics, visual filters, and dynamic challenges. During an interview at San Diego Comic-Con, Neal stated that Capcom had made several improvements to the online capabilities of their games since the release of 3rd Strike Online Edition in 2011 after considering fan feedback, focusing on the new options to filter matches by ping and region of play.

Marvel vs. Capcom Origins was released in North America and Europe on September 25 and 26, 2012. The European PlayStation 3 version was originally scheduled to be released alongside its Xbox 360 counterpart, but an unspecified error delayed its release until October 10, 2012. Following the expiration of their licensing contracts with Marvel Comics, Capcom announced in an employee blog, released in December 2014, that Marvel vs. Capcom Origins would be delisted from online stores. The game was available on the PlayStation Network for the United States and Europe up until December 23 and on Xbox Live Arcade globally until December 31. Its removal came shortly after the recent sweep of digital Marvel-related titles during late 2013, including Marvel vs. Capcom 2: New Age of Heroes, Marvel vs. Capcom 3: Fate of Two Worlds and Ultimate Marvel vs. Capcom 3.

== Reception ==
Reception

Aggregate score
Aggregator	Score
Metacritic	PS3: 72/100; X360: 78/100

Review scores
Publication	Score
Electronic Gaming Monthly	9/10
IGN	8.2/10
PlayStation Official Magazine – Australia	5/10
Official U.S. PlayStation Magazine	7/10
Official Xbox Magazine (US)	6.5/10

Marvel vs. Capcom Origins received mixed to positive reviews from critics upon release, with aggregate review website Metacritic assigning a score of 72 out of 100 for the PlayStation 3 version, and 78 out of 100 for the Xbox 360 version. The game received praise for its preservation of the original arcade releases' integrity, additions of online multiplayer and challenges, and variety of unlockable content. On the other hand, it received criticism for its small and unsatisfying selection of games, as well as outdated gameplay mechanics. Ray Carsillo of Electronic Gaming Monthly awarded Origins a 9 out of 10, stating the game "does a fine job of staying true to the originals, while the addition of dynamic challenges provide a new layer of addictiveness that helps to overshadow how much these games have aged in the past two decades".

Taylor Cocke of IGN rated the title 8.2 out of 10, concluding that "neither title is perfect due to some blatantly unbalanced characters, but as a walk down memory lane, this package is hard to beat". Official U.S. PlayStation Magazine gave the game a score of 7 out of 10, saying the "minimal-frills two-pack is definitely entertaining while it lasts". Heidi Kemps of Official Xbox Magazine came to a verdict of 6.5 out of 10, praising the visual presentation and accurate reproduction of the coin-operated originals, while criticizing clunky mechanics. Official PlayStation Magazine Australia labeled Marvel vs. Capcom Origins "a bland and unexciting update of a couple of classics that have long been superseded", rating the game 5 out of 10.
