= Quiz Nanairo Dreams =

1996 video game

Quiz Nanairo Dreams - Nijiirochō no Kiseki
- Arcade flyer for the game
- Developer: Capcom
- Publisher: Capcom
- Platforms: Arcade, PlayStation, Sega Saturn
- Release: Arcade: JP: 26 August 1996; PlayStation and Sega Saturn: JP: 27 June 1997
- Genres: Quiz, dating sim
- Modes: Single-player, multiplayer
- Arcade system: CP System II

Quiz Nanairo Dreams: Nijiiro-chō no Kiseki (Japanese: クイズなないろDREAMS 虹色町の奇跡; "Quiz Seven Color Dreams - Miracle of Rainbow Color Village") is a Japanese video game developed by Capcom. The game is a hybrid of a quiz game and a dating sim.

It was released in 1996 originally for the arcade game running on the CP System II platform, and was then released for the PlayStation and Sega Saturn systems in 1997.

== Gameplay ==
The game combines elements of a quiz game and a dating sim. Answering questions in the quiz allows the player to move through squares. Correct answers increases the love of the female characters and advances the plot.

The game was originally an arcade title, and when ported to home console, two new routes were added. The two new scenarios were for Pixy and Linz. Voice acting was also added for all the dialogue.

== Plot ==
The goal of the game is to seal the devil, and that is achieved by restoring the seven crystals assimilated into seven girls.

== Release ==
The game was released for arcades on September 20, 1996. It was ported to the Sega Saturn and Sony PlayStation home consoles and was released on June 27, 1997.

The game was added to the PlayStation Network Game Archives on July 27, 2011 in Japan.

== Reception ==
Reception

Review score
Publication	Score
Dengeki PlayStation	85/100, 90/100, 75/100, 85/100

In Japan, Game Machine listed Quiz Nanairo Dreams on their October 15, 1996 issue as being the most-successful arcade game of the month, outperforming titles such as Dancing Eyes and Street Fighter Zero 2 Alpha. Upon release, Famitsu gave the PlayStation and Sega Saturn version of the game 28 out of 40.

== Appearances in other games ==
- Saki Omokane appears as a helper character in the Capcom fighting game Marvel vs. Capcom: Clash of Super Heroes and a playable character in Tatsunoko vs. Capcom. Her main weapon is her machine gun, though this makes her physical moveset limited. Her ending has her having tea with the rest of the female characters in Tatsunoko Vs. Capcom: Cross Generation of Heroes (Roll, Jun the Swan, Morrigan, Doronjo, and Chun-Li). Saki starts explaining about her world and its mechanics, while the rest of the girls remain clueless about what she's talking about. In its later revision, Ultimate All Stars, she helps save the twisting dimensions and soon finds that the reason she fights is to protect the friends she made. She then prepares to protect her city from a rampaging Hauzer. She is voiced by Yoko Honna. While she does not appear in Ultimate Marvel vs Capcom 3, one of Jill Valentine's alternate colors is based on Saki.
- Saki also appears as Capcom character card C119 in the Neo Geo Pocket Color game SNK vs. Capcom: Card Fighters' Clash. She comes with a special ability called "Stand-By", which is triggered once she enters the ring (field of play) and allows the player to pick one card from his deck and shuffle the rest, while placing that card on top of the deck to be drawn on the next round. Another character, Linz, is depicted on Action card A42, called "Pester", which allows the player to put three of the opponent's pile cards among his/her discarded (out of play) cards.
