= Evo 2026 =

2026 fighting game tournament in Las Vegas

2026 Evolution Championship Series
- Evolution Championship Series logo

Tournament information
- Location: Las Vegas, United States
- Dates: June 26, 2026–June 28, 2026
- Venue: Las Vegas Convention Center
- Participants: 5,774
- Purse: US$500,000

Final positions
- Champions: SF6: Saul Leonardo "MenaRD" Mena II; T8: Arslan "Arslan Ash" Siddique; GGS: "RedDitto"; 2XKO: "Hikari"; GBVS:R: Matthieu "Kojicoco" Fardet; FF:COTW: Xiao Hai; IVS: "Akuri"; ROA2: Justin "Plup" McGrath; BBCF: "Fukku"; UNI2: "BigBlack"; VF5REVO: "GentlemanThief"; VSAV: "Kaji"

Evo 2026, officially the 2026 Evolution Championship Series, was a fighting game tournament held in Las Vegas, Nevada, United States, from June 26 to 28, 2026. The event took place at the West Exhibition Hall of the Las Vegas Convention Center. It was part of the Evolution Championship Series, an annual open-bracket esports event focused on fighting games.

The main lineup consisted of twelve tournaments: Street Fighter 6, Tekken 8, Guilty Gear -Strive-, 2XKO, Granblue Fantasy Versus: Rising, Fatal Fury: City of the Wolves, Invincible VS, Rivals of Aether II, BlazBlue: Central Fiction, Under Night In-Birth II [Sys:Celes], Virtua Fighter 5 R.E.V.O. World Stage and Vampire Savior. The event had 5,774 unique competitors registered for at least one tournament.

== Venue ==
Evo 2026 was held from June 26 to 28, 2026, at the West Exhibition Hall of the Las Vegas Convention Center. Top-eight finals for six featured titles were held in an arena inside the same hall. The event included tournament play, publisher and developer booths, vendor areas, an arcade, artist displays, cosplay programming and publisher panels.

== Games ==
The official Evo 2026 rules listed the following twelve main tournament games: Vampire Savior, a 1997 fighting game by Capcom, was included in the main lineup as an arcade title.

Main tournament games at Evo 2026
Game	Platform	Publisher
Street Fighter 6	PlayStation 5	Capcom
Tekken 8	PlayStation 5	Bandai Namco Entertainment
Guilty Gear -Strive-	PlayStation 5	Arc System Works
2XKO	PlayStation 5	Riot Games
Granblue Fantasy Versus: Rising	PlayStation 5	Cygames
Invincible VS	PlayStation 5	Skybound Games
Fatal Fury: City of the Wolves	PlayStation 5	SNK
Rivals of Aether II	PC	Aether Studios
BlazBlue: Central Fiction	PlayStation 5	Arc System Works
Under Night In-Birth II	PlayStation 5	Arc System Works
Virtua Fighter 5 R.E.V.O. World Stage	PlayStation 5	Sega
Vampire Savior	Arcade	Capcom

== Broadcast ==
Evo 2026 competitions were streamed live on Twitch and YouTube.

== Announcements ==
During Evo 2026, fighting game publishers announced characters, downloadable content and other updates for titles. These included the Samurai Outriders team for Marvel Tōkon: Fighting Souls, Kenshiro for Fatal Fury: City of the Wolves, The Path of the Warrior: Art of Fighting 3 R, Lux and Samira for 2XKO, season-one downloadable content for Invincible VS, Bob for Tekken 8, Robo-Ky for Guilty Gear -Strive- and downloadable content plans for Avatar Legends: The Fighting Game. Other announcements concerned BlazBlue: Central Fiction, Granblue Fantasy Versus: Rising, Rivals of Aether II, Under Night In-Birth II [Sys:Celes] and Virtua Fighter Crossroads.

== Results ==
The following tables list the top-eight placements for the main tournaments. MenaRD won the Street Fighter 6 tournament, becoming the first player to win back-to-back Street Fighter 6 championships at Evo. Arslan Ash won the Tekken 8 tournament, defeating Rangchu in the final. The win was his eighth Evo title and his fourth consecutive Tekken tournament win at Evo.

Street Fighter 6
Place	Player	Alias	Character(s)
1st	(Dominican Republic) Saul Leonardo Mena II	MenaRD	Blanka, M. Bison
2nd	(Japan) unknown	Shigematsu	Blanka
3rd	(France) Kilyan Faucheux	Kilzyou	Juri, Mai
4th	(Chile) Jaime Bustos	Craime	M. Bison, Ryu
5th	(Japan) Ryo Nozaki	Dogura	Elena
5th	(Japan) unknown	Tantanmen	Jamie
7th	(Dominican Republic) Lenny Almanzar	CrossoverRD	Sagat
7th	(China) Kuang Zhen	Zhen	Dee Jay, Sagat, M. Bison

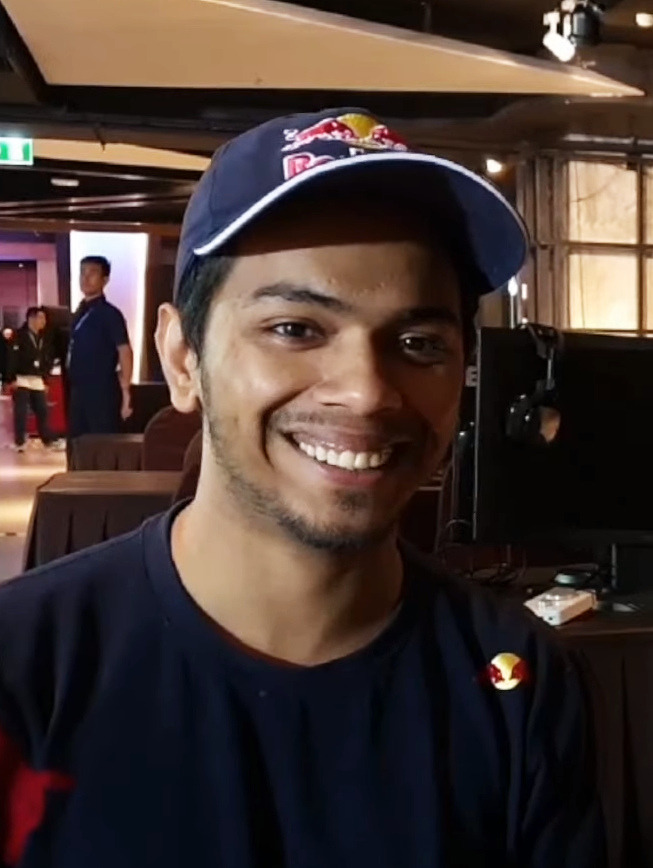
Arslan Ash won his eighth Evo title after winning the Tekken 8 tournament.

Tekken 8
Place	Player	Alias	Character(s)
1st	(Pakistan) Arslan Siddique	Arslan Ash	Kunimitsu, Nina
2nd	(South Korea) Hyunho Jung	Rangchu	Fahkumram
3rd	(South Korea) Yoon Sun-woong	LowHigh	Bryan
4th	(South Korea) Sanghyeon Jeon	JeonDDing	Eddy
5th	(South Korea) Oh Dae-il	Meo-IL	Jack-8
5th	(Pakistan) Qasim Meer	Qasim Meer	Azucena, Zafina
7th	(Japan) Daichi Nakayama	Nobi	Lars, Steve
7th	(United States) Jarrad Gooden	Ninjakilla_212	Law

Fatal Fury: City of the Wolves
Place	Player	Alias	Character(s)
1st	(China) Zeng Zhuojun	Xiaohai	Mr. Karate, Billy
2nd	(Japan) Kenta Ichihara	mi2ha4	Rock
3rd	(Japan) Shoji Sho	Fenritti	Mr. Karate
4th	(Mexico) Daniel Fuentes Garcia	Dany "El Maza"	Billy
5th	(Japan) Akihito Sawada	SCORE	Mr. Karate, Andy
5th	(Greece) Konstantinos Lamprou	K-TOP	Mr. Karate
7th	(Saudi Arabia) Abu Omar	AbuOmar	Kim Dong Hwan
7th	(Taiwan) Chia-chen Tseng	ZJZ	Mr. Karate, Gato

Guilty Gear Strive
Place	Player	Alias	Character(s)
1st	(United States) unknown	RedDitto	Ramlethal
2nd	(Senegal) Ismaila Gueye	Verix	Nagoriyuki
3rd	(United States) unknown	NitroNY	Leo
4th	(United States) Andre Covington	Cheryo	Goldlewis
5th	(United States) unknown	Kshuewhatdamoo	Johnny
5th	(United States) Kermit Alexander	Kermit	Baiken
7th	(Japan) Kojiro Tsuchiya	Jiro	Anji
7th	(Japan) unknown	T Y	Slayer, Giovanna

Granblue Fantasy Versus: Rising
Place	Player	Alias	Character(s)
1st	(United States) Matthieu Koji Fardet	Kojicoco	Beatrix
2nd	(United States) unknown	Shio	Lowain
3rd	(Japan) unknown	Miraias	Eustace, Seox
4th	(United States) Kyran Reives	Monarch	Metera
5th	(Haiti) Alvin Jackson	BlueSkyGuyBSG	Vaseraga
5th	(Japan) unknown	ZanDori	Cagliostro
7th	(United States) unknown	Paid Actor	Vira
7th	(United States) unknown	Insurgent	Eustace

2XKO
Place	Player	Alias	Character(s)
1st	(United States) Jo'siah Miller	Hikari	Akali, Ahri
2nd	(United States) Dominique McLean / Lenwood Arnold	SonicFox / INZEM	Ahri, Jinx / Teemo, Thresh
3rd	(United States) Steve Carbajal	Supernoon	Teemo, Ekko
4th	(Japan) Shunsuke Abe	poka	Akali, Ahri
5th	(Japan) unknown / unknown	Toshi / Haru	Jinx / Thresh
5th	(United States) unknown	bleed	Ekko, Illaoi
7th	(France) Hasni Rivallin	Noka	Ekko, Vi
7th	(United States) unknown	Globo	Teemo, Yasuo

Invincible VS
Place	Player	Alias	Character(s)
1st	(United States) unknown	akuri__	Omni-Man, Robot, Rex Splode
2nd	(United States) Drew Stakelum	Zippy	Invincible, Omni-Man, Rex Splode
3rd	(United States) Timothy Horvath	BoyManGuyPalBudBroBae	Invincible, Omni-Man, Rex Splode
4th	(United States) Dylan G.	Dylnyan	Bulletproof, Omni-Man, Rex Splode
5th	(United States) unknown	ROW1	Robot, Omni-Man, Rex Splode
5th	(United States) unknown	Cold	Ella Mental, Rex Splode, Monster Girl
7th	(United States) Josh Jodoin	NerdJosh	Bulletproof, Rex Splode, Robot
7th	(United States) Trinity C.	Claysculpture	Bulletproof, Omni-Man, Atom Eve

Rivals of Aether II
Place	Player	Alias	Character(s)
1st	(United States) Justin McGrath	Plup	Orcane, La Reina
2nd	(United States) Alex Strobel	CakeAssault	Fleet, Forsburn
3rd	(United States) Nick Stango	Stango	Loxodont
4th	(United States) William Batista	Bbatts	Fleet
5th	(United States) unknown	Sophilo	Zetterburn
5th	(United States) Tarun Chemiti	Beastly	Zetterburn
7th	(United States) Stephen Myers	Sandstorm	Galvan
7th	(United States) Ryan Schrier	Yoda Cage	Absa

BlazBlue: Central Fiction
Place	Player	Alias	Character(s)
1st	(Japan) unknown	Fukku	Bang, Susanoo
2nd	(Japan) Shoji Sho	Fenritti	Jin
3rd	(United States) Ryane Jimenez	xcaliburbladez	Carl
4th	(United States) unknown	Rascal	Bullet
5th	(Japan) unknown	Makki	Rachel
5th	(Japan) unknown	Masa	Mai
7th	(Japan) unknown	chiri	Carl
7th	(United States) Kyran Reives	Monarch	Es, Lambda-11

Under Night In-Birth II
Place	Player	Alias	Character(s)
1st	(United States) Izayah Davis	BigBlack	Byakuya
2nd	(United States) Randy C.	knotts	Wagner, Seth
3rd	(France) unknown	Pierre	Tsurugi
4th	(United States) Filip Koperwas	2GB Combo	Carmine
5th	(United States) unknown	NegaReaper	Tsurugi
5th	(United States) Michael Hernandez	PREMIUM STROKES	Phonon, Ogre
7th	(United States) unknown	Rio Jin-Mori	Hyde
7th	(Japan) unknown	mobu murabito	Merkava

Vampire Savior
Place	Player	Alias	Character(s)
1st	(Japan) unknown	Kaji	Lilith
2nd	(Japan) unknown	nakanishi	Bishamon
3rd	(Japan) unknown	Atsuta	Hsien-Ko
4th	(Japan) unknown	Decameron	Lord Raptor
5th	(Japan) unknown	kosyo	B. B. Hood, Hsien-Ko, Q-Bee
5th	(Japan) unknown	Sakamoto	Q-Bee
7th	(Japan) unknown	orecom	Sasquatch
7th	(Japan) unknown	DD	Sasquatch

Virtua Fighter 5
Place	Player	Alias	Character(s)
1st	(United States) Avery Carey	GentlemanThief	Jean Kujo, Akira Yuki
2nd	(Japan) unknown	Gakusei Sarah	Kage-Maru, Sarah Bryant, Jacky Bryant
3rd	(United States) Randi S.	Tricky	Eileen
4th	(United States) Yohan Yon	VFNumbers	Lei-Fei
5th	(United States) Branden Cole	KNR	Akira Yuki
5th	(United States) unknown	Crazydrunk	Shun Di
7th	(United Kingdom) Connor McBride	Limy	Lei-Fei
7th	(United States) unknown	GenesisFrenzy	Aoi Umenokoji
