= Arslan Ash =

Pakistani esports player

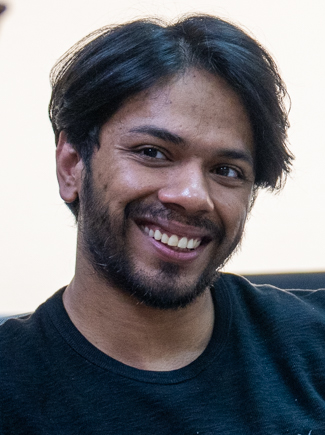
- Siddique in 2026

Personal information
- Name: ارسلان صدیقی (Arslan Siddique)
- Born: 20 August 1995 (age 31); Lahore, Pakistan

Career information
- Games: Tekken; The King of Fighters
- Playing career: 2010–present

Team history
- 2018–2020: vSlash eSports
- 2019–present: Red Bull eSports
- 2021–2023: FATE eSports
- 2023–present: Twisted Minds

Career highlights and awards
- Tekken: Champion: 8x EVO champion (2019 x2, 2023 x2, 2024, 2025 x2, 2026); 2x Combo Breaker champion (2022, 2023); 1x Tekken World Tour champion (2023); 1x OUG Tournament champion (2018); 1× CEO champion (2021); WePlay Ultimate Fighting League (WUFL) Season 1 Champion (2021); 1x VSFighting X Masters Tournament champion (2022); 1x IESF World Esports Championships (2022); 1x Battle Arena Melbourne champion (2024); 1x Thunderstruck champion (2024); 1x Esports World Cup#Gamers8 winning team (2023); 1x Tekken 7 Nations Cup winning team (2023); Runner-up: 1x Combo Breaker runner-up (2024); The King of Fighters: Champion; 1x GCC Games champion (2018); 1x OUG Tournament champion (2018); 1x Thunderstruck champion (2024)

Arslan Siddique (Urdu: ارسلان صدیقی; born 20 August 1995), better known as Arslan Ash, is a Pakistani professional esports player specializing in Tekken. He is an eight-time EVO champion and winner of the 2023 Tekken World Tour Finals. He currently represents Twisted Minds.

== Personal life ==
Arslan was born in Lahore, Pakistan, on 20 August 1995. He first played Tekken 4 when he was aged eight at a local Lahore arcade center, which sparked his interest in the Tekken series of fighting games. He is a chartered accountant but did not pursue that career. He got married in February 2023.

In February 2026, Arslan announced that he had relocated to Japan to establish it as his primary base for professional competition and training, citing easier access to international tournaments and a more stable training environment. Despite relocating, he stated he would continue to represent Pakistan in international events.

== Career ==
Being a fan of Pokémon, Arslan adopted the name Arslan Ash. Arslan's first major tournament win was in 2010, when he won the Tekken 6 Grand Masters Championship.

=== 2018 ===
After dominating the local The King of Fighters Pakistani circuit, he pooled money together to attend KOF GCC Games 2018 in Oman, where the international gaming community first took notice of him. Arslan stated that his gaming moniker, "Ash," was taken directly from his favorite KOF character, Ash Crimson.

In October 2018, Arslan achieved his international breakthrough at the OUG Tournament in Dubai, beating. a performance that widely credited him with placing Pakistan on the global competitive Tekken map. Entering the event as an unseeded wildcard, he completed an undefeated bracket run by defeating top-ranked South Korean player Bae "Knee" Jae-min, including a dominant 3–0 sweep in the grand finals. Concurrently, he won the The King of Fighters XIV tournament at the same event. Siddique later cited the OUG 2018 victory as the most significant psychological milestone of his early career.

=== 2019 ===
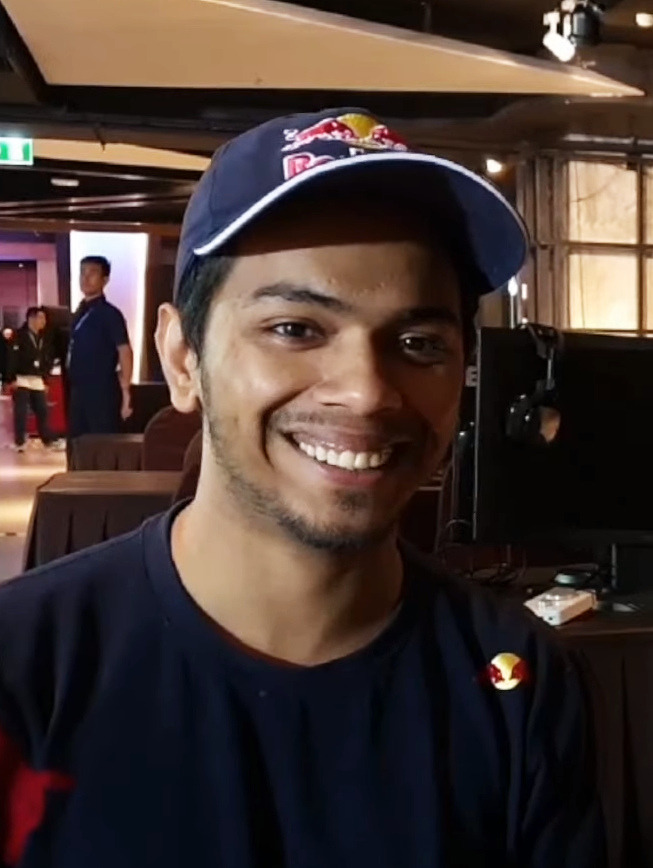
Siddique in an interview in 2019

Arslan's international breakthrough at Evo Japan 2019 was nearly derailed by severe visa delays and logistical hardships. Despite facing severe visa delays and logistical hurdles—including a grueling two-and-a-half-day journey involving five flight transfers—Arslan arrived at EVO Japan 2019 just four hours before his matches began. In the end, Arslan managed to win the EVO Japan 2019 championship

Later, he also won Evolution Championship Series 2019, making him the sole individual to achieve success in both tournaments at the time. Additionally, he also won the WePlay Ultimate Fighting League title for Tekken 7.

Arslan was awarded the Best E-Player of 2019 by respondents of a Twitter poll organized by ESPN.

=== 2021 ===
In 2021, Arslan became the Community Effort Orlando tournament champion.

In the same year, In April 2021, Arslan Ash captured the Tekken 7 championship at the inaugural WePlay Ultimate Fighting League (WUFL) Season 1 in Kyiv, Ukraine. Navigating the top eight bracket undefeated, he went on to secure the first-place prize of $15,000 by defeating compatriot Awais "Awais Honey" Iftikhar in an all-Pakistani grand finals showcase.

=== 2022 ===
Arslan won the Combo Breaker 2022 Tekken 7 tournament.

He also secured third position in the Evolution Championship Series 2022 Tekken 7 competition.

In August 2022, Arslan won the Tekken 7 championship at the VSFighting X Masters tournament in Birmingham, England. After being sent to the losers bracket by British player Hasan "JoKa" Rashid, Arslan ran through the elimination bracket without dropping a match, successfully resetting the grand finals and defeating JoKa 3–1 in the final set to claim the title.

In December 2022, Arslan captured the Tekken 7 championship at the IESF 14th World Esports Championships in Bali, Indonesia. Representing Team Pakistan, he went undefeated throughout the group and knockout stages, concluding his run with a 3–0 sweep against South Korea's Kim "Sora" Jung-soo in the grand finals to secure the gold medal.

=== 2023 ===
Arslan Ash won the Tekken World Tour 2023 Finals in New Orleans. He went undefeated throughout the tournament and defeated South Korea’s Kim “CBM” Jae-hyun 3-1 in the Grand Finals, using a surprise Katarina pick. With this victory, Arslan became the first player to win EVO Japan, EVO US, and the Tekken World Tour in the same year.

Later, In May 2023, Arslan Ash successfully defended his Tekken 7 title at Combo Breaker by defeating his longtime South Korean rival Bae "Knee" Jae-min, 3–0 in the grand finals after a bracket reset, earning 300 Tekken World Tour ranking points. Throughout his career, Arslan Ash established a historic rivalry with Knee whom he repeatedly defeated during his initial rise to global prominence, though visa issues later prevented him from attending scheduled international events like REV Major 2023.

In the same year, he also won the Tekken 7 competition at EVO Japan 2023 after beating South Korea’s Meo-IL.

He also represented Pakistan in the Tekken 7 Nations Cup, where his team emerged as the champions, defeating South Korea in the final and claiming the trophy as well as $50,000 in prize money.

In the same year, Esports World Cup#Gamers8 festival in Riyadh, Saudi Arabia, the Pakistani team of Arslan, Atif Butt, and Imran Khan won the tournament's Tekken 7 Nations Cup. Representing Team Pakistan, the squad progressed through the international field to face Team South Korea in the tournament's grand final on July 9, 2023. Pakistan secured the championship with a 3–2 victory in the final match, claiming the first-place prize of $500,000 from the event's total $1 million Tekken 7 prize pool.

Arslan won his fourth EVO title in Tekken 7 on 6 August 2023. He defeated Japanese player Akihiro "Ao" Abe in the grand final, 3-0. This is Ash's second time as the unified EVO champion, having won both EVO Las Vegas and EVO Japan in the same year. He is the only player to have won four EVO titles in Tekken 7.

By winning both the EVO titles and Tekken World Tour Finals in the same season, he became the first ever "Triple Crown" champion in competitive Tekken history.

=== 2024-2025 ===
At Combo Breaker tournament 2024 in the United States, Arslan Ash finished as the runner-up in the Tekken 8 tournament. Entering the grand finals on the winners side, he was defeated 3–2 by Filipino competitor Alexandre "AK" Laverez, marking Laverez's first major international title victory over Arslan.

Arslan won his fifth and sixth EVO championships by winning the titles in Las Vegas for Tekken 8 in 2024 and 2025. He won his seventh EVO title at EVO France 2025.

Arslan also finished top global leaderboard at the Tekken World Tour in 2024. In December 2025, Red Bull released a dedicated documentary detailing his competitive career and rise to prominence within the fighting game community, titled The Story of Arslan Ash, King of Tekken.

At Thunderstruck 2024, an official Tekken World Tour challenger event held in Monterrey, Mexico, Arslan claimed the Tekken 8 championship title by defeating fellow Pakistani competitor Farzeen with a 3–0 sweep in the grand finals. Utilizing Nina Williams during the tournament, he also competed in the side events and concurrently won the The King of Fighters XV championship at the same venue.

Arslan's other competitive performances in the 2024 and 2025 seasons included a premier championship title at Battle Arena Melbourne 15, as well as a top-eight placement at the SOOP Tekken League Finals.

In June 2025, the International Esports Federation (IESF) retroactively has suggested banning Arslan following a positive test result of for anabolic steroids at the 2022 World Esports Championship, running from April 26, 2023, to April 25, 2025. However, the Esports Integrity Commission (ESIC) stated they decided to ignore IESF ruling, noting that WADA rules apply to traditional sports only and are not applicable to esports. Arslan claimed a lack of knowledge regarding the prohibited status of the substances, stating he ceased using them once informed, and argued they provided no gaming advantage.

=== 2026 ===
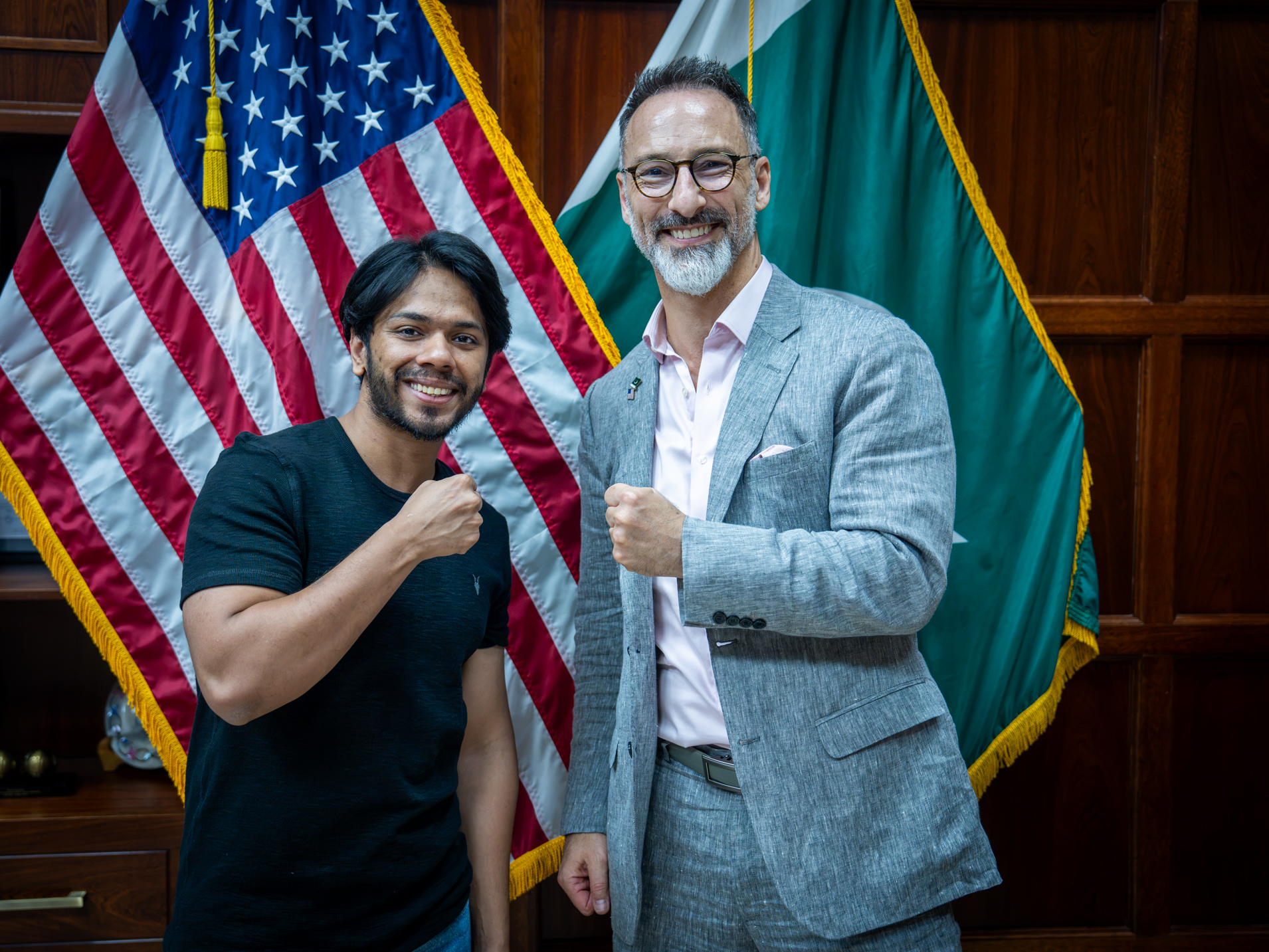
Siddique (left) with Stetson Sanders, the United States consul general to Lahore, in 2026

For his performance in the 2025 season, he won Player of the Year award at EVO Awards 2026.

At Evo 2026, Arslan won the Tekken 8 tournament, defeating Rangchu in the grand finals. The win marked his eighth Evo championship and qualified him for the Tekken World Tour Finals.

== Awards and nominations ==
Ceremony	Year	Category	Result	Ref.
ESPN Esports Awards	2019	Best Player	Won	
EVO Awards	2026	Player of the Year	Won	
