= Evo 2025 =

Fighting game event held in Las Vegas

2025 Evolution Championship Series
- Evolution Championship Series logo

Tournament information
- Location: Las Vegas, United States
- Dates: August 1, 2025–August 3, 2025
- Venue: Las Vegas Convention Center
- Participants: 8,541

Final positions
- Champions: SF6: Saul Leonardo "MenaRD" Mena II; T8: Arslan "Arslan Ash" Siddique; FF:COTW: Goichi "GO1" Kishida; GGS: "Kshuewhatdamoo"; GBVS:R: Matthieu "Kojicoco" Fardet; MVC2: Ken "Khaos" Villalobos; UNI2: "Defiant"; MK1: Dominique "SonicFox" McLean

The 2025 Evolution Championship Series (commonly referred to as Evo 2025 or EVO 2025) was a fighting game event held in Las Vegas from August 1 to 3, 2025 as part of the long-running Evolution Championship Series. The event marked the debuts of Fatal Fury: City of the Wolves as well as the return of Marvel vs Capcom 2 as a mainline game for the first time since 2010. This also marked the debut of the EVO Extended Lineup of 8 games.

== Venue ==
EVO 2025 returned to the Las Vegas Convention Center with a return to a Top 8 Finals lineup. The Top 8 of the official lineup of games took place in an in-building arena while the Extended Lineup took place entirely outside of the arena. Nevertheless, all 16 games were broadcast by tournament organizers and were given a trophy ceremony.

== Games ==
Announced on January 16, 2025, the following games returned as a mainline game: Street Fighter 6, Tekken 8, Guilty Gear Strive, Granblue Fantasy Versus: Rising, Under Night In-Birth II and Mortal Kombat 1. Marvel vs Capcom 2 returned as a singles tournament for the first time since 2010. In addition, it was revealed that the tournament would also support 8 additional games as part of the Extended Lineup: The King of Fighters XV, Rivals of Aether 2, Virtua Fighter 5: R.E.V.O., BlazBlue: Central Fiction and Killer Instinct were revealed the same day while Samurai Shodown and Guilty Gear Xrd Rev 2 were revealed at later dates.

== Participants ==
Nearly 8,500 players competed in the mainline games with more attending the Extended Lineup and other tournaments.

== Broadcast ==
The tournament was streamed on the streaming site Twitch as well as YouTube, broadcast across multiple different streams.

== Reveals ==
Capcom revealed a teaser trailer for C. Viper, the second character in the season 3 pass as well as a trailer for Outfit 4 costumes for several Street Fighter 6 characters. Bandai Namco released a gameplay trailer for Armor King as well as a teaser for Miary Zo, a new fighter from Madagascar. Sega revealed a World Stage update for Virtua Fighter 5: R.E.V.O. as well as brief gameplay of Virtua Fighter 6 featuring Akira and Stella Bryant. Arc System Works revealed a gameplay trailer for Cyberpunk: Edgerunner's Lucy, the final character for season 4 DLC of Guilty Gear Strive. In addition, Wilmas was revealed as the next character for Granblue Fantasy Versus: Rising as well as EX versions of every character in the roster. SNK revealed additional gameplay footage of Ken Masters and revealed he is available afterwards while stating the release date of Chun-Li to be the winter of 2025. Hunter × Hunter: Nen × Impact revealed Neferpitou as the first DLC character for the game. There were also beta testing of Marvel Tokon: Fighting Souls and Invincible VS.

== Results ==
Street Fighter 6
Place	Player	Alias	Character(s)
1st	(Dominican Republic) Saul Leonardo Mena II	MenaRD	Blanka
2nd	(Japan) Kakeru Watanabe	Kakeru	JP
3rd	(Hong Kong) Chan Pak-yin	Micky	Cammy, Mai
4th	(Norway) Arman Hanjani	Phenom	Cammy
5th	(China) Zeng Zhuojun	Xiaohai	Mai, M. Bison
5th	(Japan) Keita Ai	Fuudo	Ed, Dee Jay
7th	(South Korea) Shin Moon-sup	Leshar	Terry, Mai, Ed
7th	(United Arab Emirates) Amjad Al-Shalabi	AngryBird	Ken

Tekken 8
Place	Player	Alias	Character(s)
1st	(Pakistan) Arslan Siddique	Arslan Ash	Nina, Anna
2nd	(Pakistan) Atif Ijaz	Atif	Anna
3rd	(Japan) Yuta Take	chikurin	Clive, Lili
4th	(South Korea) Han Jae-gyun	Mulgold	Claudio, Lei Feng
5th	(South Korea) Yoon Sun-woong	LowHigh	Bryan
5th	(Japan) Daichi Nakayama	Nobi	Lars, Steve. Dragunov
7th	(South Korea) Oh Dae-il	Meo-Li	Jack-8
7th	(South Korea) Kim Hyun-jin	JDCR	Dragunov

Fatal Fury: City of the Wolves
Place	Player	Alias	Character(s)
1st	(Japan) Goichi Kishida	GO1	Kain, Marco
2nd	(Taiwan) Lin Chiahung	E.T.	Hokutomaru, Billy
3rd	(Japan) Shoji Sho	Fenritti	Kain
4th	(South Korea) Lee Chung-gon	POONGKO	Gato
5th	(Japan) Kazuyuki Koji	KojiKOG	Billy
5th	(Japan) unknown	Laggia	Hotaru
7th	(Singapore) Ho Kun Xian	Xian	Gato
7th	(Japan) Tsutomu Kubota	kubo	Hokutomaru

Guilty Gear Strive
Place	Player	Alias	Character(s)
1st	(United States) unknown	Kshuewhatdamoo	Johnny
2nd	(United States) unknown	RedDitto	Ramlethal
3rd	(United States) unknown	Aboii	Potemkin
4th	(Japan) Yuya Fujiwara	tatuma	Sol
5th	(South Korea) Kim Jae-won	Daru_I-No	I-No
5th	(United States) unknown	Jack	Happy Chaos
7th	(Senegal) Ismaila Gueye	Verix	Nagoriyuki
7th	(United Kingdom) unknown	Precho	Goldlewis

Granblue Fantasy Versus: Rising
Place	Player	Alias	Character(s)
1st	(United States) Matthieu Fardet	Kojicoco	Beatrix
2nd	(United States) Brandon Wanders	Zane	Grimnir
3rd	(Japan) unknown	Tororo	Percival, Siegfried
4th	(Japan) Junichi Kumano	Fukunaga	Versusia, Lancelot
5th	(Japan) unknown	Zenith	Grimnir
5th	(United States) Kyran Reives	Monarch	Metera
7th	(United States) unknown	Ryazu	Charlotta
7th	(United States) Alex Vo	Vermillion	2B

Marvel vs Capcom 2
Place	Player	Alias	Characters
1st	(Japan) Ken Villalobos	Khaos	Magneto/Storm/Sentinel, Sentinel/Storm/Cyclops, Magneto/Storm/Cyclops
2nd	(United States) Andy Nguyen	VIGGA	Magneto/Storm/Psylocke
3rd	(United States) unknown	Servbot	Magneto/Storm/Psylocke
4th	(United States) Peter Rosas	COMBOFIEND	Sentinel/Magneto/Iron Man
5th	(United States) Daniel Maniago	Clockw0rk	Strider/Doctor Doom/Sentinel
5th	(Peru) unknown	Peruchamp	Storm/Sentinel/Captain Commando
7th	(United States) Jason Ramoutar	Gconceptz	Magneto/Storm/Psylocke
7th	(Japan) Johnathan Talley	telly	Sentinel/Storm/Captain Commando

Under Night In-Birth II
Place	Player	Alias	Character(s)
1st	(Puerto Rico) Jaden E.	Defiant	Londrekia, Hyde, Ogre
2nd	(United States) Izayah Davis	BigBlack	Byakuya
3rd	(United States) Randy Knotts	knotts	Wagner, Orie, Seth
4th	(Mexico) Mario Silva	Mario	Wagner
5th	(Japan) unknown	suteneko	Mika
5th	(Canada) unknown	Revert	Linne
7th	(Japan) unknown	Senaru	Eltnum
7th	(United States) unknown	OmniDeag	Eltnum

Mortal Kombat 1
Place	Player	Alias	Character(s)
1st	(United States) Dominique McLean	SonicFox	Cyrax/Madam Bo, Sektor/Kung Lao
2nd	(Chile) Nicolás Martínez	Nicholas	Havik/Mavado, Reiko/Tremor, Homelander/Ferra, Baraka/Tremor
3rd	(Turkey) Mustafa Bicici	Kanimani	Sindel/Tremor, Homelander/Ferra, Johnny Cage/Tremor
4th	(United States) unknown	Hourglass_of_rain	Mileena/Kung Lao, Mileena/Tremor
5th	(United States) unknown	Onlinecale213	Kung Lao/Sektor
5th	(Spain) Javier Alonso	MKJavierMK	Scorpion/Terra, Scorpion/Tremor
7th	(United States) George Foulkes Jr.	Grr	Geras/Motaro
7th	(Canada) unknown	MichaelCeraFan	Geras/Motaro
