= Marvel Tōkon: Fighting Souls =

2026 video game

- Developer: Arc System Works (Note: Additional development by PlayStation Studios XDev)
- Publisher: Sony Interactive; Entertainment
- Director: Kazuto Sekine
- Producers: Takeshi Yamanaka; Reed Baird; Kazuma Kizuka; Sayaka Utsunomiya
- Designer: Kazuto Sekine
- Artists: Kenta Kurosaka; Kiesuke Miura; Katsuki Mukai; Hidehiko Sakamura; Yuki Kato; Ayako Suzuki
- Writer: Kieron Gillen
- Composers: Toma Otowa; Melissa Reese; Brain; STROBES; Daisuke Ishiwatari; Alissa White-Gluz; Norichika Sato; Keiichi Okabe
- Engine: Unreal Engine 5
- Platforms: PlayStation 5; Windows
- Release: WW: August 6, 2026; JP: August 7, 2026
- Genre: Fighting
- Modes: Single-player, multiplayer

Marvel Tōkon: Fighting Souls (Note: Tōkon (闘魂) literally means "fighting souls") is a 2026 fighting game developed by Arc System Works and published by Sony Interactive Entertainment. It was officially announced in June 2025, and was released for PlayStation 5 and Windows on August 6, 2026.

Featuring characters appearing in Marvel Comics publications, the game is premised on a tag team system that entails beginning matches with a single fighter and an assist character. A full lineup of four characters is gradually unlocked by fulfilling mid-match conditions such as damage accumulation and "Wall Breaks" that transition fights across multiple arenas in a stage, culminating in 4v4 gameplay that alternates between assist-based combat with singular characters and an active tag mechanic that enables players to control other fighters in their lineup. The game features both online casual and ranked multiplayer modes with full cross-platform play support between PS5 and PC, alongside offline single-player content, including arcade mode and a full story mode.

SIE's interest in creating a new first-party fighting game led them to approach Marvel Games following their successful collaboration on the Marvel's Spider-Man series. Sony courted Arc System Works to develop the title with Marvel's approval. Production began with the goal of incorporating a system deemed approachable for newcomers to the fighting game genre, but with a depth that satisfied the game's potential for competitive play. The game's roster accommodates Arc System Works' variety of gameplay archetypes, comprising major Marvel characters and obscure selections that have not appeared in previous Marvel fighting games.

== Gameplay ==
Marvel Tōkon: Fighting Souls is a 2.5D fighting game in which players compete against each other in tag team combat using an ensemble of Marvel Comics characters. Players must knock out the opponent on the opposing team through repeated attacks which drain a health bar. Iterating on other tag fighters and previous Marvel-based fighting games such as the Marvel vs. Capcom franchise, Fighting Souls employs a 4v4 system which allows the player to alternate between a setup of one primary character and three assist fighters who can be called in for additional offense, or an active tag system enabling the "leader" to be swapped out for other fighters during the match and individually controlled. When matches begin, players will be restricted to only using their primary character and a single assist fighter, gradually enabling access to their full team as they fulfill certain mid-match conditions such as "Wall Breaks", a returning mechanic from the Arc System Works title Guilty Gear Strive (2021), that is triggered when a combo or high-damaging move is performed in the corner of the arena.

Contrasting other tag-based fighters and previous Marvel titles, teams in Fighting Souls all share a single health bar, known as a Vital Gauge, that extends over the course of a round as more of a player's team is made accessible. Assist mechanics are represented by an "Assemble Gauge", with each character's move being dictated by the type of attack mode they are designated by the player during character selection. Forward Assist types are relegated to using projectile attacks for disrupting other fighters as an example, while Downward Assists are more effective for anti-air interruptions. The assist characters can then be tagged in and controlled either right before, or immediately after landing an attack, which is known in-game as a "Crossover". Like Granblue Fantasy Versus and Versus Rising, the control schemes of Fighting Souls features Light, Medium and Heavy Normal Attacks, and a Unique Attack that draws on a particular ability associated with the character such as Captain America throwing his shield, or Iron Man firing a series of repulsor blasts. A third "Skill Gauge" allows fighters to consume some meter for performing higher-damage EX attacks or a cinematic Ultimate Skill when completely filled, and can be used in conjunction with the Assemble Gauge to chain multiple Ultimate Skills across a whole team together, similar to the Delayed Hyper Combo mechanic (DHC) in Marvel vs. Capcom games. Additionally, an All-Out Attack-based Tōkon Assemble can only be used when the player is in danger where the opponent wins two out of three rounds, and all three members are available to use alongside the additional assist and skill gauges that requires to be filled at maximum level, with the ending cinematic sequence ends with the main member finishes the opponent.

Like previous Arc System Works titles such as Strive and Dragon Ball FighterZ (2018), Fighting Souls features stages that encompass multiple distinct areas with visual iconography drawn from the Marvel Universe, and are cycled through mid-match when initiating Wall Breaks.

The game's primary single player mode is "Episode Mode", which features storylines for each of the five teams that culminate in boss battles against the Promoter and the Champion.

=== Playable characters ===
The base roster features twenty playable characters, split evenly between five teams of four, plus one unlockable character. At least four additional characters are planned as downloadable content (DLC).

Amazing Guardians

- Ms. Marvel (Kamala Khan)
- Peni Parker
- Spider-Man (Peter Parker)
- Star-Lord (Peter Quill)

Fighting Avengers

- Black Panther (Shuri)
- Captain America (Steve Rogers)
- Hulk (Bruce Banner)
- Iron Man (Tony Stark)

Knights of Doom

- Carnage (Cletus Kasady)
- Doctor Doom (Victor von Doom)
- Green Goblin (Norman Osborn)
- Magneto (Erik Lehnsherr)

Samurai Outriders

- Blade (Eric Brooks)
- Deadpool (Wade Wilson)
- Ghost Rider (Robbie Reyes)
- Loki

Unbreakable X-Men

- Danger
- Magik (Illyana Rasputina)
- Storm (Ororo Munroe)
- Wolverine (James "Logan" Howlett)

Unlockable Boss

- The Champion (Note: The base version of The Champion, the Origin form is non-playable, while his full power form, consist of both Primordial and Awakened forms is his playable version)

Season 1 DLC

- Jubilee (Jubilation Lee)
- Phoenix Cyclops (Scott Summers)
- Thor (Jane Foster)
- Venom (Eddie Brock)

== Plot ==
The Champion, an Elder of the Universe who has destroyed multiple worlds that have failed to produce worthy opponents, has chosen Earth as his next target after destroying Chandilar, the Shi'ar home planet. His Promoter announces "The Challenge of the Champion", forcing teams of fighters to compete in qualifying rounds before they can challenge the Champion himself. The Promoter chooses several heroes to lead teams of four — per the Champion's decision as an homage to the Fantastic Four — who must compete in the tournament before being allowed to challenge the Champion and attempt to prevent Earth's destruction.

=== Fighting Avengers ===
After defeating Gargantos with the current Avengers roster, Captain America makes it to the newly christened Avengers Park in New York, which features a statue of him, Iron Man, and Thor Odinson, but feels guilty that Hulk is not among the honored, ever since he lost control of himself at the end of Kree-Skrull War that caused him to be banished to Savage Land. Suddenly, the Promoter appears and hands Steve his invitation before announcing the tournament, sending the world into a panic. He and Iron Man had a brief fight for their team's leadership, until the latter admit his defeat. Later, both men goes to Wakanda to acquire data about the Champion and to recruit Shuri, who has become the new Black Panther and Queen following an attack on the country by Doom that left her brother T'Challa incapacitated. They then venture to the Savage Land to recruit the Hulk, who is still bitter towards his former teammates after they exiled him there. Despite his reservations, he agrees to join them, forming the Fighting Avengers.

As the Avengers defeat the opposing teams in the tournament, Iron Man gathers intel from other individuals such as Peni, Danger, and Doom to find out what the Champion truly does with the losing worlds, eventually discovering he places them in a pocket dimension and forces them to constantly exercise and fight. After they overcome the Champion once, Captain America challenges him to an all or nothing battle to release the other captured worlds, feeling they shouldn't be abandoned. Hulk forgives Steve and agrees to fight alongside him. The Champion is defeated after getting knocked into Avengers Park, where he releases the other worlds and vows to come fight them again. In the aftermath, Avengers Park is reopened with an updated statue including Hulk alongside the heroes, Shuri is accepted as the new Black Panther by her people, and Iron Man begins creating a new armor using the design of Peni's Sp//dr as an inspiration.

=== Unbreakable X-Men ===
Following a recent clash with a Phoenix-possessed Cyclops, the Promoter sent an invitation letter to Professor X off-screen for the X-Men's participation to the Champion's tournament on Earth. Storm steps up to lead the team in the challenge of the Champion while the rest of the team recovers at the X-Mansion, joined by Magik and Wolverine. Magik is unstable due to the Champion's presence disrupting Limbo, and Wolverine's healing factor is limited due to the aforementioned struggle. Danger joins the team after her AI gains sentience and creates a body for herself once she discovers the destruction of Chandilar. Magneto offers to join the team, but is ultimately rejected when he refuses to align with Professor X's ideals, instead allying with Doom.

Throughout their fights, Danger learns more about life from their interactions with other opponents as well as the discrimination mutants face on a regular basis. When the X-Men eventually defeat the Champion, he offers to protect mutants while eliminating humans, but the X-Men refuse and face him again to protect humanity. After triumphing once more, the Champion offers his help in erasing the hatred of mutants, but Storm refuses, knowing it's not as easy as it sounds. After learning from the Promoter that the Shi'ar were not destroyed but imprisoned, Danger requests that the captured worlds be released, which the Champion obliges to. When they return home, they find some of the people initially protesting against them have started siding with them as a result of their actions. Danger chooses to stay on Earth to learn more about life, while the X-Men fully recuperate and continue their quest to fight for mutant and human coexistence.

=== The Amazing Guardians ===
Putting the safety of the planet over a party at his Aunt May's, Spider-Man attempts to gather a team, but immediately finds himself in hot water when the Green Goblin steals his tournament invite while he saves Ms. Marvel from peril. Star-Lord joins Spider-Man on the promise he gets a portion of the prize for winning the tournament. Peni Parker, along with her mech Sp//dr, who were displaced from their universe by the Champion's cosmic power causing a dimensional shift, are also brought on to the team. Despite being green, Ms. Marvel is accepted as well. Calling themselves the Amazing Guardians, the foursome enter the tournament, forging an invite via Sp//dr to replace the one Green Goblin stole, which the Promoter accepts to spite the Knights of Doom.

After they defeat the X-Men, Storm and Professor X learn that Ms. Marvel has an X-Gene that is still safely dormant when she first mutated into an Inhuman, and believe she will play an important role in the future. Once all opposing teams are defeated, the Amazing Guardians face off against the Champion, where they learn what he does with the captured worlds. Despite barely overcoming him after the first round, they battle his stronger forms when Spider-Man wishes for him to free the captive worlds. When they ultimately triumph, the Champion takes in Spider-Man's mantra of "With great power comes great responsibility" to fulfill all their wishes. After restoring the captured worlds, he returns Peni to her home dimension and helps her battle a cosmic threat she observed, gifts Star-Lord his belt to exchange for riches alongside the Guardians of the Galaxy, and grants Ms. Marvel's request to return Peter Parker to Aunt May. Ms. Marvel continues her superhero career and takes selfies with everyone she teams up with.

=== The Knights of Doom ===
Doctor Doom was in a middle of listening to Latverian chorus before his Doombot alerts him the Champion of the Universe set Earth as a staging for his tournament. Doom initially opposes the Champion by himself out of displeasure for not getting an invitation letter from the Promoter but is easily repelled. He then forges an uneasy alliance with Magneto by promising him a mutant nation. The two then recruit the Green Goblin, who had stolen Spider-Man's invitation, and blackmail him by threatening to expose his secret identity as Norman Osborn to ruin his presidential campaign. Doom has Goblin release Carnage from the Raft, so he can serve as their fourth member, forming the Knights of Doom. Though the Promoter is dismayed to allow Doom into the tournament due to the stolen invitation, the Champion allows the Knights to join due to being entertained by Doom's bravery and demonstrated skill.

Throughout their battles against the other teams, Doom siphons various power sources from their fallen foes such as Loki's Mind Gem, Magik's unstable Limbo energy, and Hulk's gamma radiation. When they initially defeat the Champion the first time, Magneto traps Doom to get the Champion to grant his wish, only for Doom to reveal his master plan: To use the various energy sources he has stolen to overwhelm the Champion and absorb his powers to become a god, prompting the Champion to unleash his full strength. Doom kills the Champion and empowers himself. He fulfills Magneto and Goblin's respective wishes of receiving a mutant nation and winning the presidency, but both are forced to live in a world ruled by Doom. He recruits Carnage as his personal hunter to take out any heroes that oppose him as he begins his conquest to conquer the rest of the universe.

=== Samurai Outriders ===
Robbie Reyes initially refuses to join the tournament to focus on his job repairing cars, but is given an incentive when The Promoter kidnaps his younger brother Gabe. Having no idea where to find three other members for his team, the Hell Charger — Robbie's demonic ride possessed by the spirit of Eli Morrow — assists him in doing so. He takes him to Blade, who worked with the previous Ghost Rider, Deadpool, who was rejected by the other teams in the tournament for being a loose cannon, and Loki, who hopes to clear his name to the public and people of Asgard following Thor's disappearance. Doom offers Loki a spot on his team, but he refuses so he can prove to the world he's trying to become a good person. Despite the invitation naming them the Midnight Sons, Deadpool insists that they are called the Samurai Outriders.

Throughout the tournament, Robbie struggles with the responsibility of saving the world and controlling the demon inside of him. After defeating the Champion once and rescuing Gabe, Robbie discovers via the Penance Stare that the Champion has imprisoned all the worlds he's defeated and demands for their release. They defeat him and Robbie stops his demonic side from killing everyone there. When they return, the rest of the Outriders agree to help Robbie with his auto body shop, and Blade offers to mentor the young hero with controlling the demon within. For his actions in the tournament, Loki is forgiven by the people of Asgard and accepted back into the realm.

== Development ==
Sony Interactive Entertainment (SIE) had expressed interest in developing a first-party fighting game for its PlayStation library, having already made efforts to support the genre in other capacities through their co-ownership of Evolution Championship Series (EVO) between 2021 and 2025 and promotion of third-party titles on their consoles such as Street Fighter 6 (2023) and Tekken 8 (2024). This prompted producer Reed Baird from SIE's XDev team to pitch a such a project to Marvel Games. SIE proposed a tag team fighting game, aware that Marvel held a prior reputation as a major presence in the subgenre due to their past partnership with Capcom on the Marvel vs. Capcom series. Marvel had similarly fostered a successful working relationship with SIE due to their collaboration on the Marvel's Spider-Man series developed by Insomniac Games, which led them to reciprocate enthusiastically towards the idea according to Marvel Games' senior Product Development Manager Michael Francisco Jr.

A representative from SIE met with Arc System Works producer Takeshi Yamanaka to present the concept and entice them to develop the game, a decision Marvel similarly approved due to their prior experience in tag-based fighting games such as BlazBlue: Cross Tag Battle and Dragon Ball FighterZ (both 2018). Despite initial hesitations regarding Arc System Works' capability of handling the property, the urging of president/CEO Minoru Kidooka convinced Yamanaka to take on the project. Kidooka previously spoke during Evo 2022 about motivating the studio towards being less passive with pursuing opportunities to collaborate with external license holders following their work on FighterZ and Cross Tag Battle, specifically wishing to produce projects involving franchises with broader Western appeal, and being a proponent of using third-party IP such as Marvel to expand the reach of the fighting game community.

Arc System Works began production with the goal of making a fighting game that was more accessible to a wider audience, including accommodations for simplified and traditional inputs, as well as character skills that are common amongst the whole roster. Game director Kazuto Sekine explained that despite internal deliberations about making a traditional 1v1 fighter or adhering to the 3v3 format of other tag-based games, they opted for a 4v4 system out of a desire to capture the intensity of multiple on-screen characters in combat, emphasizing the unique team-ups and crossing over of Marvel characters. With regards to the roster, Yamanaka stated that the team developed criteria around fighter selection, wishing to include characters considered the 'faces of Marvel' while also leaving room for more obscure picks that had never appeared in prior Marvel-based fighting games.

=== Presentation ===
According to Baird, the development of Fighting Souls was motivated by the PlayStation Studios XDev team's mantra of "From Japan to the World", alluding to a desire of bringing the work and inspirations of Japanese developers to a global platform. Yamanaka stated that while their original intention was for the aesthetics of the game to evoke the look of a Western comic book, they were encouraged by Marvel to lean further into a style distinct to their previous titles such as the Guilty Gear series, leading to an art direction more rooted in anime. This was reflected in creative decisions that emphasized the immersion of Marvel characters in a Japanese pop cultural backdrop, such as Iron Man's armor drawing inspiration from mecha anime, and Captain America's voice lines being directed to sound triumphant and expressive, akin to a shōnen protagonist. The game serves as a posthumous credit for Takaya Hashi, the Japanese voice actor of Doctor Doom, who died from a heart attack on August 27, 2025. The game will feature voices in English, French, Italian, German, Spanish, Brazilian Portuguese, Latin American Spanish, Japanese, Korean and Chinese. The game's storyline was written by comics author Kieron Gillen, with different artists providing the art for each team's story in Episode Mode.

== Release ==
Marvel Tōkon: Fighting Souls was announced during a State of Play presentation on June 4, 2025, accompanied by a developer documentary featuring interviews from various staff at SIE's XDev team, Arc System Works and Marvel Games. The game made its public debut at Evolution Championship Series (EVO) 2025, including a playable demo available to the public with a portion of the game's roster, and a "Developer Combat Panel" hosted by its developers to detail the game's core mechanics. A closed beta began on September 5 and ran through September 7, 2025 for PlayStation 5. Participating players were able to try six characters from the roster—Iron Man, Captain America, Ms. Marvel, Star-Lord, Storm and Doctor Doom—in online multiplayer with support for rollback netcode and spectator mode, as well as a tutorial mode upon startup for learning the game's controls and mechanics.

The game appeared at Tokyo Game Show 2025 later that month with a new playable build, adding Spider-Man and Robbie Reyes / Ghost Rider to the roster available to the public, and publicly debuting the Savage Land stage. A second closed beta took place between December 5 and December 7, 2025 on PlayStation 5. Unlike the initial closed beta, this session ran for a full consecutive 72-hour period with no intervals, and allowed players to access Spider-Man and Ghost Rider in online matches. In addition to the Savage Land, the beta debuted a new stage, the X-Mansion.

The Unbreakable X-Men team was formally unveiled during Sony's State of Play presentation in February 2026, debuting the inclusions of Magik, Wolverine and Danger while also teasing the game's single-player story mode and revealing the game's launch date and details regarding pre-orders, which opened the following week. From then on, the remaining launch roster was revealed through trailers showcasing the factions characters would be formed around in the game's narrative. The Amazing Guardians team led by Spider-Man and featuring Star-Lord, Peni Parker / SP//dr and Kamala Khan / Ms. Marvel was unveiled during the Arc World Tour 2025-26 Grand Finals in March 2026, alongside the Knowhere stage. The Fighting Avengers team led by Steve Rogers / Captain America and featuring Iron Man, Hulk and Shuri / Black Panther alongside the Wakanda stage, was revealed at EVO Japan in May 2026, where the game made a further playable appearance with a new build that debuted Peni Parker, Black Panther and Wakanda to the public. The Knights of Doom led by Doctor Doom and featuring Magneto, Norman Osborn / Green Goblin and Cletus Kasady / Carnage, was revealed during Sony's State of Play presentation in June 2026, alongside the game's updated retail key art and the full unveiling of the Champion of the Universe as the primary antagonist in the game's story mode. The final team, the Samurai Outriders led by Robbie Reyes / Ghost Rider, was unveiled at the main EVO 2026 stage later that month, confirming Blade, Loki and Deadpool as the final inclusions of the base roster, showcasing the Asgard stage, and revealing an open beta set to take place in late July 2026 for both PlayStation 5 and Windows. Fighting Souls is the first Marvel-based fighting game in mainline game consoles since Marvel vs. Capcom: Infinite (2017).

Marvel Tōkon: Fighting Souls was released as a console exclusive for PlayStation 5 and Windows on August 6, 2026. Additional cosmetics for the online lobby are available as pre-order incentives. The game is also available in a Digital Deluxe Edition, which includes the pre-order bonuses, additional cosmetics, and the first year season pass; and the Ultimate Edition, which includes all of the Digital Deluxe content, additional character colors, and five costumes, one of which is based on Spider-Man's appearance in Insomniac Games' Marvel's Spider-Man series. A costume based on Wolverine's appearance in Insomniac's Marvel's Wolverine was added in a free update on August 28. The game's multiplayer supports full cross-platform play between the PlayStation 5 and Windows versions. On Steam, the game reached a peak of 24,498 concurrent players and was the platform's fourth-best-selling title at launch. The game's costumes for Spider-Man and Wolverine were subsequently added to Marvel's Spider-Man 2 and Marvel's Wolverine respectively.

=== Music ===
On July 24, 2026, the track "Stronger as One" was released from the Marvel Tōkon: Fighting Souls Original Video Game Soundtrack, with lyrics by Kanata Okajima, composition and arrangement by Megmetal, and vocals from Keiko Terada of Show-Ya and Mayu of Nemophila.

== Reception ==
Reception

Aggregate scores
Aggregator	Score
Metacritic	(PC) 83/100 (PS5) 85/100
OpenCritic	94% recommend (Note: Based on 111 reviews)

Review scores
Publication	Score
Destructoid	9/10
Edge	8/10
Eurogamer	4/5
Game Informer	85%
GameSpot	9/10
GamesRadar+	4.5/5
Hardcore Gamer	4/5
HobbyConsolas	90%
IGN	9/10
Jeuxvideo.com	80%
PC Gamer (US)	80/100
Push Square	9/10
Shacknews	9/10
The Games Machine (UK)	9/10
The Guardian	4/5

=== Pre-release reactions ===
Multiple comparisons were favorably drawn between Capcom's games and Fighting Souls, with particular attention drawn towards the presence of launchers, assist characters and aerial combos, as well as the involvement of 4v4 fights, considered a direct iteration of the 3v3 setup popularized by the Marvel vs. Capcom games. Commentators also highlighted the game's resemblance to Arc System Works' prior licensed game Dragon Ball FighterZ (2018). Complaints were raised online about the need for a PlayStation Network account to play the game on Steam, resulting in a lack of availability in 132 countries and territories.

Upon the release of the public beta in July 2026, the game's PC port was criticized for its severe performance and technical issues. Vice reported that the game's performance issues were attributed to Sony's attempt to reduce datamining.

=== Critical reception ===
Marvel Tōkon: Fighting Souls received "generally favorable" reviews, according to review aggregator website Metacritic. Fellow review aggregator OpenCritic assessed that the game received "mighty" approval, being recommended by 94% of critics.

The PC version received criticism for requiring users to log into PlayStation Network as well as its poor performance. Reviewers noted that PC players faced longer matchmaking times than PS5 players, as the latter would disable cross-play to avoid being matched against opponents facing performance issues. The performance problems were largely attributed to excessive DRM as well as background processes related to the game's anti-cheat and PSN integration, with a cracked copy of the game that removes these being shown to run significantly better than the official release.

=== Sales and revenue ===
In the United States, Marvel Tōkon: Fighting Souls debuted at number 17 on the PlayStation 5 games ranking by weekly active users during its open beta for the week ending 25 July 2026, according to Circana. Following its release, in the United Kingdom, the game debuted at number 6 on the physical sales chart for the week ending 8 August. The game was the 2nd most-downloaded title on PlayStation 5 in the United States and Canada in August.

In September 2026, market research and data analysis firm Alinea Analytics estimated that Marvel Tōkon: Fighting Souls sold 740,000 copies across all platforms and generated $49 million in revenue.

=== Awards ===
Year	Award	Category	Result	Ref.
2026	Golden Joystick Awards	Best Multiplayer Game	Nominated	
2026	Thailand Game Awards	Best Fighting Game	Won	
2026	The Game Awards 2026	Best Fighting Game	Pending	

== Tie-in media ==
Marvel Comics is set to publish a one-shot comic titled Marvel Tōkon: First Strike on August 6, 2026, co-written by Steve Orlando, Josh Trujillo and Tom Waltz with art by Bruno Büll, Áthila Fabbio, and Ryusei Yamada. The story will primarily follow the Fighting Avengers and Unbreakable X-Men, expanding on their respective members' backstories while also introducing the game's antagonists, the Promoter and Champion. Throughout August and September, variant covers highlighting the game's playable roster will also be featured on select Marvel Comics solicitations. As part of a cross-promotional campaign with the PlayStation Studios game Marvel's Wolverine, an alternate suit for James Howlett / Wolverine inspired by his Tōkon appearance is featured in the game as an unlockable costume, while Tōkon itself will add an "Battle Reborn" suit from Marvel's Wolverine as an alternate costume for the titular character himself, as part of a free update to the game on September 1, 2026.
