= Evo 2024 =

Fighting game event held in Las Vegas

2024 Evolution Championship Series
- Evolution Championship Series logo

Tournament information
- Location: Las Vegas, United States
- Dates: July 19, 2024–July 21, 2024
- Venue: Las Vegas Convention Center
- Participants: 10,240

Final positions
- Champions: SF6: Victor "Punk" Woodley; T8: Arslan "Arslan Ash" Siddique; GGS: Shamar "Nitro" Hinds; GBVS:R: Aaron "Aarondamac" Godinez; SF:3S: Joe "MOV" Egami; UNI2: "Senaru"; MK1: Dominique "SonicFox" McLean; KOFXV: Zeng "Xiao Hai" Zhuojun

Tournament statistics
- Attendance: ~18,000

The 2024 Evolution Championship Series (commonly referred to as Evo 2024 or EVO 2024) was a fighting game event held in Las Vegas from July 19 to 21, 2024 as part of the long-running Evolution Championship Series. The event marked the debuts of Granblue Fantasy Versus: Rising, Under Night In-Birth II [Sys:Celes] and Mortal Kombat 1. It also the return of Street Fighter III: 3rd Strike as a mainline game for the first time since 2009.

== Venue ==
For the first time since 2016, EVO 2024 took place in the Las Vegas Convention Center. The Top 6 of every game took place in an arena built within the convention center with the top 4 games by attendance taking place on Sunday.

== Games ==
Announced on February 6, 2024, the following games returned as a mainline game: Street Fighter 6, Guilty Gear Strive and The King of Fighters XV. Four games from previous franchises made their debut as a mainline tournament: Tekken 8, Granblue Fantasy Versus: Rising, Under Night In-Birth II and Mortal Kombat 1. Street Fighter III: 3rd Strike returned as a singles tournament for the first time since 2008. The game was last featured as a 2v2 tournament in 2009. Several other tournaments took place as part of the EVO Community Showcase as well as many more unofficial tournaments.

== Participants ==
A record 10,240 players took part in the mainline games.

== Broadcast ==
The tournament was streamed on the streaming site Twitch as well as YouTube, broadcast across multiple different streams.

== Reveals ==
Namco announced the return of Heihachi Mishima, thought to be dead after the events of the story of the previous game, to playable status with a gameplay trailer for Tekken 8. Capcom released a teaser trailer for Terry Bogard, someone who was previously announced as a future playable character for Street Fighter 6. Lucy from Cyberpunk: Edgerunners was revealed as a Season Pass 4 character for Guilty Gear Strive, the first guest character in franchise history. Venom and Dizzy were also revealed to be characters set to be part of the season pass. CyGames released a gameplay trailer for Versusia as the next character for Granblue Fantasy Versus: Rising. The trailer teased Vikala and Sandalphon as future characters for the game. A gameplay trailer for Samurai Jack was released for Multiversus with a release date of July 23 as well as a teaser for Beetlejuice. SNK revealed a gameplay trailer of Kevin Rian for Fatal Futy: City of the Wolves as well as Vice and Mature for The King of Fighters XV. The company also announced a new Art of Fighting game as well as a Samurai Showdown action RPG. Uzuki was revealed in a gameplay trailer for Under Night In-Birth II.

== Results ==
Street Fighter 6
Place	Player	Alias	Character(s)
1st	(United States) Victor Woodley	Punk	Cammy, Akuma
2nd	(United Arab Emirates) Adel Anouche	Big Bird	Rashid
3rd	(United Kingdom) Samuel Arm	EndingWalker	Ed
4th	(Japan) Yusuke Momochi	Momochi	Ed
5th	(Japan) Naoki Nemoto	Nemo	M. Bison, Blanka, JP
5th	(China) Kuang Zhen	Zhen	JP
7th	(United Arab Emirates) Amjad Al-Shalabi	AngryBird	Ken
7th	(Japan) Hajime Taniguchi	Tokido	Ken

Tekken 8
Place	Player	Alias	Character(s)
1st	(Pakistan) Arslan Siddique	Arslan Ash	Nina
2nd	(Pakistan) Atif Ijaz	Atif	Dragunov, Feng
3rd	(Japan) Daichi Nakayama	Nobi	Dragunov
4th	(South Korea) Lim Soo-hoon	ULSAN	Dragunov, Reina
5th	(Saudi Arabia) Raef Alturkistani	Raef	Jin
5th	(Japan) Takaba Keisuke	Keisuke	Kazuya
7th	(South Korea) Kim Hyun-jin	JDCR	Dragunov
7th	(South Korea) Kim Jae-hyun	CBM	Jin

Guilty Gear Strive
Place	Player	Alias	Character(s)
1st	(United States) Shamar H.	Nitro	Jack-O, Giovanna
2nd	(Japan) unknown	tatuma	Sol Badguy
3rd	(United States) unknown	RedDitto	Ramlethal
4th	(Israel) Atir Yosef	Zando	Asuka
5th	(South Korea) Nicolas Yavrouian	OoeyGooeyChewySnicker	Anji
5th	(United States) unknown	Jack	Happy Chaos
7th	(Sweden) William Hjelte	Leffen	Happy Chaos
7th	(Senegal) Ismaila Gueye	Verix	Nagoriyuki

Granblue Fantasy Versus: Rising
Place	Player	Alias	Character(s)
1st	(United States) Aaron Godinez	Aarondamac	Belial
2nd	(Japan) unknown	Tororo	Percival, Siegfried
3rd	(United States) Mathieu Fardet	Kojicoco	Nier
4th	(United States) Brian Huang	Artorias	Siegfried
5th	(United States) Alex Vo	Vermillion	2B
5th	(United States) Oscar Jaimes	Shinku	Beatrix
7th	(United States) Bradford Severance	Xerom	Charlotta
7th	(Canada) John K.	Haveaniceday	Djeeta

Street Fighter III: 3rd Strike
Place	Player	Alias	Character(s)
1st	(Japan) Joe Egami	MOV	Chun-Li, Elena, Ken
2nd	(Japan) Issei Suzuki	Issei	Yun
3rd	(Canada) Henri Oung	Chi-Rithy	Chun-Li
4th	(Japan) Ryuji Hayashi	Hayao	Hugo
5th	(United States) Franklin Nunez	FrankieBFG	Ken
5th	(United States) unknown	Resolve	Urien
7th	(France) Clairet Jocelyn	NiaBanH	Makoto
7th	(Japan) unknown	Shirokuro	Chun-Li

Under Night In-Birth II
Place	Player	Alias	Character(s)
1st	(Japan) unknown	Senaru	Eltnum
2nd	(United Kingdom) unknown	Mo.Sin	Kuon
3rd	(Japan) unknown	Notes	Carmine
4th	(Puerto Rico) Jaden E.	Defiant	Londrekia
5th	(Japan) unknown	Oushuu-Hittou	Seth
5th	(Mexico) Mario Silva	Mario	Wagner
7th	(Japan) unknown	Mawaru	Hilda
7th	(United States) Izayah Davis	BigBlack	Byakuya

Mortal Kombat 1
Place	Player	Alias	Character(s)
1st	(United States) Dominique McLean	SonicFox	Johnny Cage/Khameleon, Sindel/Kung Lao, Homelander/Khameleon
2nd	(Chile) Nicolás Martínez	Nicholas	Johnny Cage/Khameleon, Johnny Cage/Kung Lao, Rain/Janet Cage, Baraka/Kano
3rd	(Brazil) Pedro Ribeiro	Zeeus	Ashrah/Khameleon
4th	(United States) Daniel Taibot	TheMightyUnjust	Homelander/Khameleon, Ermac/Sonya Blade
5th	(Spain) Javier Alonso	MKJavierMK	Scorpion/Khameleon, Scorpion/Jax
5th	(United States) Alex Ruiz	Dyloch	General Shao/Khameleon
7th	(United States) Curtis McCall	Rewind	Reiko/Tremor, Li Mei/Janet Cage, General Shao/Khameleon, Others
7th	(Brazil) Wellington de Castro	Konqueror249	Kenshi/Sub-Zero

The King of Fighters XV
Place	Player	Alias	Character(s)
1st	(China) Zeng Zhuojun	Xiaohai	Geese/Benimaru/Isla, Kyo/Benimaru/Isla
2nd	(Taiwan) Lin Chiahung	E.T.	Geese/Benimaru/Isla, Clark/Geese/Isla, Others
3rd	(Mexico) Ángel Chong	Tamago	Blue Mary/Rock/Benimaru, Benimaru/Ryo/Rock
4th	(Mexico) Rolando Neri	ViolentKain	Rock/Ryo/Iori, Kyo/Rock/Ryo
5th	(Mexico) unknown	KoferoHonesto	Ryo/Yamazaki/Orochi Chris, Ryo/Yamazaki/Goenitz
5th	(Japan) Akihito Sawada	Score	Orochi Yashiro/Chizuru Kagura/Heidern
7th	(Japan) unknown	mok	Shun'ei/Isla/Kukri
7th	(South Korea) Kang Myung-gu	Lacid	Meitenkun/Shermie/Ash
