= Granblue Fantasy =

2014 role-playing video game

- Developer: Cygames
- Publisher: Cygames
- Director: Tetsuya Fukuhara
- Producers: Yuito Kimura (2014); Koichi Haruta (2014 - 2016); Yuito Kimura (2016 - 2024); Unknown (2024 - present)
- Artists: Hideo Minaba; Yuya Nagai; Ryoji Ohara; Ryota Murayama; Hitomi Yoshimura
- Composers: Nobuo Uematsu; Tsutomu Narita
- Platforms: Android; iOS; iPadOS; Web browser; Windows
- Release: JP: March 10, 2014; WW: March 10, 2026
- Genre: Massively multiplayer online role-playing game
- Modes: Single-player, multiplayer

Granblue Fantasy (Note: Japanese: グランブルーファンタジー, Hepburn: Guranburū Fantajī) is a Japanese role-playing video game developed by Cygames for Android, iOS and web browsers, which was first released in Japan in March 2014. The game reunites music composer Nobuo Uematsu and art director Hideo Minaba, who previously collaborated on Final Fantasy V (1992), VI (1994), and IX (2000) and Lost Odyssey (2007).

== Gameplay ==
Granblue Fantasy plays as a role-playing video game with turn-based battles. The game also contains summons and a class system that alters the main character's move-set and growth. Characters gain levels and abilities by accruing experience; by collecting certain materials, some character may earn an extra star (which is called "FLB" or full limit break), resulting in new abilities and drastically improving their power. The player character, who is always a part of the party, can equip various classes to best suit the current challenge. Summons and weapons equipped also confer characters with bonuses on attack power, HP, and the passive skills each weapon holds. Building up a 'grid' of weapons and summons is the core of progression in Granblue Fantasy, with a variety of grids and character line-ups required to tackle the harder challenges in the game.

Whilst some quests are single player, there are a variety of challenges that are tackled co-operatively, called Raids, where up to 30 players work together to defeat the boss. In these encounters, everyone's damage collectively depletes the enemy's HP, with all debuffs and enemy attacks being shared amongst the gathered players. Depending on the amount of damage they contributed, victors will receive chests of different rarity, many of which drop weapons and items key to progression.

The characters themselves are gained either via quests (the main story quests or special event quests) or by using in-game currency to roll and receive random crystal fragments, which may contain special weapons that add specific characters to the party. Characters, summons, and weapons are ranked (from rarest to common) as SSR, SR, R, or N; each is also of type wind, water, fire, earth, light, or dark. It is recommended to use a superior element in battle (for example, using water against fire-type opponents) as there are several benefits in doing so, like increasing the player team's damage output. There are even some levels that penalize the player for not using the superior element. Voice actors provide voices for all of the characters in battle, and for much of the main and event story lines, including tie-ins/collaborations, characters, and stories.

The game frequently holds a variety of special events. These include story events, that are detached from the main story, but feature various characters that are obtained via the gacha system; Unite and Fight, a mode which allows groups of players, called Crews, to compete for points for rare rewards; and special tie-in collaborations that feature characters and franchises from outside Granblue Fantasy, such as Jujutsu Kaisen, Attack on Titan, My Hero Academia, Demon Slayer, Hello Kitty, Doraemon, Cardcaptor Sakura, Love Live!, Yohane the Parhelion: Sunshine in the Mirror, Princess Connect! Re:Dive, Street Fighter, Samurai Shodown, That Time I Got Reincarnated as a Slime, Negima! Magister Negi Magi, Hunter x Hunter, Neon Genesis Evangelion, Fullmetal Alchemist, Bleach and Shaman King.

== Plot ==
=== Act 1: Girl in Blue ===
The Captain (Japanese: 団長, romanized: Danchō; the player character, either Gran (male) or Djeeta (female) by default) and their winged companion Vyrn are relaxing in the town of Zinkenstill when they spot an Erste Empire airship in the sky nearby. The Captain inadvertently comes to the rescue of a girl named Lyria and an imperial officer named Katalina as they try to escape from the Empire, but he suffers a mortal wound during the fight, forcing Lyria to merge her soul with them to bring them back from the brink of death. Lyria then uses her power to summon a giant monster called Proto-Bahamut, driving the Empire's forces away. With the Captain and Katalina's fates now tied to Lyria, the three of them decide to head to the island of Estalucia, both to escape from the Empire and possibly find clues about the Captain's estranged father.

Despite escaping, Katalina's poor piloting skills cause them to crash-land elsewhere in the Port Breeze Archipelago. The trio looks for a working airship and a pilot to steer it. They end up meeting Rackam, an odd helmsman working on an airship that has been broken for years, but the Empire follows them to the island as well, looking to recapture Lyria. The three eventually manage to convince Rackam to help them fight off the Imperial soldiers chasing them, and in return, help him finish repairing his airship, the Grandcypher, to make it skyworthy.

As the Captain travels across the skies, gathering up more allies on their journey and fighting Primal Beasts, creatures created by those many years ago, the crew finds themselves slowly dragged into a plot involving the mysterious Black Knight, the doll-like Orchis, and the history that the Empire seeks to keep secret while they pursue Lyria.

=== Act 2: Dawning Sky ===
After thwarting Freesia's ambitions and collecting the remaining Skydom Map Pieces, with the completed Phantagrande Skydom Map, they manage to break through the miasma of the Grim Basin, but due to Loki's manipulation, the Grandcypher crew is separated. The destination they arrived at was the unified kingdom that was destroyed ten years ago, the Nalhegrande Skydom. As the main characters and Katalina gather in one place, they meet a young man named Cain on Melkmaar Island, where they had drifted.

=== Act 3: Wayfaring Astral ===
After preventing The True King from taking over the Nalhe Great Wall, the Grandcypher crew went to chase after the Main Character, who had fallen from the collapsing island, and rescued Alliah.

== Development ==
I thought to myself, "Can we really make a mobile RPG with such a large-scale feeling from this?" but after seeing the game screen, I was truly surprised...It's as if you completely forget that you're playing a mobile game.

— DeNA director Kenji Kobayashi

Nobuo Uematsu worked on eleven tracks for the Granblue Fantasy, with Tsutomu Narita doing nine others, and Minaba drawing roughly 100 potential character designs. The game also contains voice overs from Hiroaki Hirata as Rackam, who previously worked on Final Fantasy XII and Dissidia 012 Final Fantasy.

Originally planned for release in Japan for December 17, 2013, it was pushed back to March 10, 2014. It is free-to-play and published by Mobage. Granblue Fantasy was expected to receive an international release in March 2016. Instead of an international launch, a language patch was released adding an in-game option to switch from Japanese to English. This allows international players who have been playing the Japanese version to keep all of their data.

The designs were created from subsidiary company CyDesignation that had created designs for different series such as Final Fantasy series (Lightning Returns: Final Fantasy XIII, Mobius Final Fantasy and Final Fantasy Legends II), Lord of Vermilion III, Bravely Second and Tokyo Mirage Sessions ♯FE. Granblue Fantasy's character designs were done by Hideo Minaba, Yuya Nagai, Ryoji Ohara, Ryota Murayama and Hitomi Yoshimura. Scenery designs by Sotaro Hori, Hitomi Yoshimura, Yutaro Kaneda, Megumi Hasegawa, Masaki Hirooka, YUU Kikuchi, Toronn, and Fumio Seno.

== Reception ==
By March 2016, the game had been downloaded over 10 million times in Japan, which had risen to over 25 million by December 2019. The game grossed ¥20.9 billion ($132.01 million) between January and October 2017. In 2018, it grossed ¥33.9 billion ($214.13 million) where it was the year's sixth highest-grossing mobile game. Combined, the game grossed at least ¥54.8 billion ($346 million) in Japan between 2017 and 2018. Many journalists compared it favorably to earlier Final Fantasy games.

=== Andira Incident ===
In December 2015, due to the proven lucrative system of the game economy, some players compulsively attempted to get desired characters via spending money on repeated random character acquisitions. The Japan Online Game Association imposed stricter restrictions on the industry after a player streamed themselves spending around ¥700,000 (~6,000 US dollars) attempting to get Andira, a new and heavily advertised character, on December 31. There was a time-limited period where Andira's appearance rate increased, with her becoming more difficult to acquire on January 3, fueling pressure on players to attempt to get her immediately. Frustration and claims of Andira's drop rate being less than advertised led developer Cygames to offer compensation in crystals to people caught in the incident, a promise to set up a system to automatically give a drop after too many "misses", and an apology from the management. On January 8, the management issued an in-game apology for the confusion and discomfort caused to customers, but no compensation has been announced for the apology. After the change in policy, players choose and immediately acquire a desired character after spending 90,000 crystals (totaling 300 draws).

== Other media ==
=== Animation ===
- Granblue Fantasy: The Animation (2017), an anime series adaption of the franchise. A-1 Pictures produced it in the Spring 2017 season. The second season began airing in Japan in the Fall 2019 season. The voice cast of Season 2 remained mostly the same as Season 1, but the production staff was almost entirely different as the studio was changed to MAPPA.
- Grand Blues! (2020), a standalone short anime adaptation of the 4-panel comedy manga by Kikuhitomoji. DMM.futureworks and W-Toon Studio produced it in the Fall 2020 season.

=== Video games ===
- Granblue Fantasy Versus, 2.5D animated console fighting video game, developed by Arc System Works for the PlayStation 4 and PC via Steam. The game was released in February 2020.
  - A sequel known as Granblue Fantasy Versus: Rising was released in December 2023, for PlayStation 4, PlayStation 5 and PC via Steam. In addition to returning contents from the first game, it features new playable characters, stages, and storyline, updated graphics and gameplay systems, lobby avatar mini games, rollback netcode, and crossplay.
- Granblue Fantasy: Relink (2024), an action role-playing game developed by Cygames Osaka (replacing the originally announced PlatinumGames). It was released in February 2024 to highly positive reviews. An expansion named Endless Ragnarok was released on July 8th 2026.

=== Manga ===
A manga adaptation of the series written by Makoto Fuugetsu and illustrated by choco was serialized on Cycomics between 2016 and 2019.
