= Knee (gamer) =

South Korean YouTuber and esports player (born 1985)

Personal information
- Name: 배재민 (Bae Jae-min)
- Born: 24 June 1985 (age 41); Gyeongbuk, South Korea

Career information
- Games: Tekken
- Playing career: 2004–present

Team history
- 2010–2021: ROX Dragons
- 2021–2022: Vision Strikers
- 2021–present: DRX

Career highlights and awards
- Red Bull Golden Letters champion 2023; IeSF World Champion 2019; Esports World Convention ESWC 2012 champion; World Cyber Games champion (2010); 2× EVO Las Vegas champion (2013, 2022); 2× EVO Japan champion (2018, 2025)
Medal record
Esports
Representing South Korea
Asian Games
Gold medal – first place	2026 Aichi–Nagoya	Competitive; Martial Arts

Korean name
- Hangul: 배재민
- Hanja: 裴宰民
- RR: Bae Jaemin
- MR: Pae Chaemin

YouTube information
- Channel: 무릎의 철권TV TekkenKnee
- Years active: 2014–present
- Genre: Gaming
- Subscribers: 361 thousand
- Views: 364,233,332
- Last updated: January 13, 2026

Bae Jae-min (Korean: 배재민; born 24 June 1985), better known as Knee, is a South Korean professional Tekken player, coach, and streamer on Twitch, YouTube and Soop on his channel. He is a four-time EVO champion, having emerged victorious in EVO Las Vegas 2013 and 2022, as well as EVO Japan 2018 and 2025, being the oldest Tekken winner in tournament history. In 2022, Knee won his 100th tournament win, being the only person in Tekken history to win more than 100 championships.

== Personal life ==
Knee was born in Gyeongbuk Province, South Korea, on June 24, 1985 and raised in Seoul. He was passionate in Tekken games in arcades since the first game. He has stated on occasions that he would train for hours daily overcoming wrist pain issues with his joystick until he could master each character in the different rosters of each iteration. The 5'7 e-sports gamer has gone on to compete in local tournaments in Seoul, South Korea at the local Green arcade before deciding to pursue a full career in e-sports. According to Knee, it was in Tekken 4 in 2004 when he started to take Tekken seriously and developed the urge to compete professionally in the game. Green Arcade in Seoul grew into a notable hub for Korean pros, with the next generation of EVO champion and Steve Fox player Nin, Knee, and MLG Circuit winner Holeman leading the team of Korean professionals in international tournaments during the arcade's golden age.

== Career ==
Knee’s debut in a major tournament was in 2005, when he entered and won the Tekken 5 Korean Arcade Championship. Knee won his first tournament in 2005 in Tekken 5: Dark Resurrection. Knee has won at the EVO tournaments for a record three separate Tekken games: Tekken Tag Tournament 2, Tekken 7, and Tekken 8. He captained South Korea when they won international tournaments for Tekken 7 in 2017.

Knee is widely regarded as one of the greatest Tekken players in history. His playstyle has been defined by "safe aggression," where he utilizes patient defensive movement and mid-range "checks" to minimize risk while gathering data on his opponent. He has been noted for his rapid adaptability and "uncanny ability to download" opponents, where Knee detects weaknesses within the first game of a set and adjusts his strategy to play subsequent rounds. He was the first player to reach the highest "Tekken God Omega" rank with every character on the Tekken 7 roster.

Knee became an EVO champion for the fourth time by winning the title in Tekken 8 on May 11, 2025 in Tokyo, at the record age of 39, one month shy of his 40th birthday.

Knee competed at the Competitive Martial Arts esports event at the 2026 Asian Games in Aichi and Nagoya, Japan. The event combines Tekken 8 with two other fighting games: Street Fighter 6 and the The King of Fighters XV. He qualified to be South Korea's Tekken player for that event in a domestic qualifier in May 2026. In the competition proper in September 2026, Knee alongside with Yeon "Dakorgi" Je-gil of Street Fighter and Lee "MadKOF" Kwang-no of King of Fighters earned a gold medal by defeating the Japanese team in the finals.

== Honors ==
In 2018, Knee was inducted into the Esports Hall of Fame in Seoul under the "Heroes" Category.

== Public image ==
Other rival gamers respect the game of Knee. For example, Arslan Ash has stated a number of times that he most feared playing against Knee, and unlike Knee has a less confrontational style where he prefers playing weaker pools in order to strategize his chances in advancing in tournaments. Publishers such as ESPN have called him arguably the best Tekken player in history. Knee's favorite character is Bryan Fury, and also plays Feng Wei and the Mishima family: Heihachi Mishima, Kazuya Mishima, and Devil Jin; he does not consider Jin Kazama nor Reina as part of the Mishimas due to the differences in their fighting styles.

Knee started the Tekken Stars Cup at Green Arcade in 2016, then later turned it into an online tournament that served as a Challengers event for many Korean professionals. Korean professionals including Ulsan have called him the father of Korean Tekken for growing the professional scene in the country.

== Sources ==
- Kim, Hyung Seok (2021). i am progamer - The Stories of Jang Jae-ho (Moon) and Cho Seong-joo (Maru). ISBN 9-791-190-98044-9.
- Kim, Hyung Seok (2022). e-Sport-Spieler, die die Welt erobert haben: Ambition, Knee, Escar Edition. Seoul: 겜툰(주). ISBN 9-791-168-44015-9.
