= Evo 2019 =

Fighting game event

2019 Evolution Championship Series
- Evolution Championship Series logo

Tournament information
- Location: Las Vegas, Nevada, United States
- Dates: August 2–4, 2019
- Venue: Mandalay Bay

Final positions
- Champions: SSBU: Leonardo "MKLeo" Lopez Perez; T7: Arslan "Arslan Ash" Siddique; SFVAE: Masato "Bonchan" Takahashi; BBTAG: Oscar "Shinku" Jaimes; MK11: Dominique "SonicFox" McLean; SS: Seon-Woo "Infiltration" Lee; DBFZ: Goichi "GO-1" Kishida; UNIST: Masaru "ClearLamp" Higuchi; SCVI: Yuta "Yuttoto" Sudo

Tournament statistics
- Attendance: ~9,000

The 2019 Evolution Championship Series (commonly referred to as Evo 2019 or EVO 2019) was a fighting game event held in Las Vegas from August 2 to 4, 2019 as part of the long-running Evolution Championship Series. The event offered tournaments for various video games, including Street Fighter V, Tekken 7, and Dragon Ball FighterZ, as well as the newly released Soulcalibur VI, Mortal Kombat 11, Samurai Shodown, and Super Smash Bros. Ultimate; the latter received the most entrants with over 3,500 players participating, making it the largest in person Super Smash Bros. tournament of all time.

== Venue ==
EVO 2019 was, once again, hosted at the Mandalay Bay resort. The Mandalay Bay Convention Center hosted the first two days of the event, while the Mandalay Bay Events Center hosted the final day for the fourth consecutive year.

== Games ==
The lineup was announced in February 2019 to have 9 games. Returning from last year are Street Fighter V: Arcade Edition, Tekken 7, Dragon Ball FighterZ, and BlazBlue: Cross Tag Battle. New additions are Soulcalibur VI, Under Night In-Birth Exe:Late[st], Samurai Shodown, Mortal Kombat 11, and Super Smash Bros. Ultimate, which effectively replaced Super Smash Bros. for Wii U. Notably, this is the first year since EVO 2013 where Super Smash Bros. Melee was not included in the lineup, and was relegated to a side-event.

== Participants ==
Over 9,000 participants were at Evo 2019.

== Broadcast ==
As usual, the tournament was streamed on the streaming site Twitch, broadcast across multiple different streams.

== Reveals ==
A few days before the tournament, a trailer for Street Fighter V: Arcade Edition revealing three upcoming characters, E. Honda, Poison, and Lucia from Final Fight was accidentally uploaded to Steam a few days ahead of its reveal at EVO by Valve, who apologized for the upload, stating that it was a "Regrettable and unintentional situation".

After the finals for Under Night In-Birth Exe:Late [st] concluded on Saturday, the game director of French Bread, Kamone Serizawa took to the stage to announce the newest version of the game, titled Under Night In-Birth Exe:Late [cl-r] alongside new character, Londrekia Light, with the game slated for an early 2020 release.

After the BlazBlue: Cross Tag Battle finals ended, Arc System Works revealed a major update to the game and revealed four out of nine new characters including Yumi from the Senran Kagura series, Akatsuki and Blitztank from Akatsuki Blitzkampf, and Neopolitan from RWBY, with a release date of November 21.

== Metal Gear Solid incident ==
During the Tekken 7 Grand Finals, a clip played in the form of a Metal Gear Solid-like codec call. It featured Solid Snake from the Metal Gear Solid franchise talking to Tekken producer Katsuhiro Harada saying "That was some good ass Tekken". The audience believed Solid Snake was being teased as the game's next DLC character. However, the official EVO Twitter account confirmed that the clip was not an official tease, but a joke that was done without the consent of Bandai Namco. Harada was surprised by the video and fans expressed dismay that it was not a real announcement. More than 12 hours since EVO made the statement, David Hayter, the voice of the character that was used in the clip, stated in a tweet that they have "failed to consult me, or Konami", reiterating to not use his voice to promote other games.

== Results ==
Super Smash Bros. Ultimate
Place	Player	Alias	Character(s)
1st	(Mexico) Leonardo Lopez	MkLeo	Joker
2nd	(United States) Gavin Dempsey	Tweek	Pokémon Trainer
3rd	(France) William Belaid	Glutonny	Wario
4th	(United States) Ezra Morris	Samsora	Peach
5th	(Japan) Tetsuya Ishiguro	Raito	Duck Hunt
5th	(Japan) Naoto Tsuji	ProtoBanham	Lucina, Inkling
7th	(Japan) Sota Okada	Zackray	Wolf
7th	(United States) Paris Ramirez	Light	Fox

Tekken 7
Place	Player	Alias	Character(s)
1st	(Pakistan) Arslan Siddique	Arslan Ash	Kazumi, Geese
2nd	(South Korea) Jae-Min Bae	Knee	Steve, Geese, Paul, Kazuya, Devil Jin
3rd	(United States) Hoa Luu	Anakin	Jack-7
4th	(Japan) Abe Takehiko	Take	Kazumi
5th	(Japan) Takumi Hamasaki	Noroma	Steve, Dragunov
5th	(Japan) Nakayama Daichi	Nobi	Dragunov, Steve, Jack-7
7th	(Japan) Yuta Take	Chikurin	Geese
7th	(South Korea) Sun-Woong Youn	LowHigh	Law, Shaheen

Street Fighter V: Arcade Edition
Place	Player	Alias	Character(s)
1st	(Japan) Masato Takahashi	Bonchan	Karin, Sagat
2nd	(United Arab Emirates) Adel Anouche	BigBird	Rashid
3rd	(United Kingdom) DC Coleman	Infexious	Zeku
4th	(Japan) Atsushi Fujimura	Fujimura	Ibuki
5th	(United States) Derek Ruffin	iDom	Laura
5th	(Japan) Masahiro Tominaga	Machabo	Necalli
7th	(Japan) Hiroki Asano	Kichipa-mu	Zangief
7th	(China) Yangmian Huang	YANGMIAN	Zeku

BlazBlue: Cross Tag Battle
Place	Player	Alias	Character(s)
1st	(United States) Oscar Jaimes	Shinku	Ruby/Yang
2nd	(Japan) Kamei Hiroyuki	Kyamei	Akihiko/Mitsuru
3rd	(Japan) Seitaro Ono	Domi	Akihiko/Yuzuriha
4th	(Japan) Kazuya Kamisue	Mekasue	Jubei/Orie
5th	(United States) Christina Kabacinski	Bace	Mitsuru/Yuzuriha
5th	(Japan) Shoji Sho	Fenritti	Mitsuru/Yuzuriha
7th	(Japan) Kazuyuki Koji	kojiKOG	Waldstein/Tager
7th	(United States) Jona Kim	Jona	Akihiko/Ruby

Mortal Kombat 11
Place	Player	Alias	Character(s)
1st	(United States) Dominique McLean	SonicFox	Cassie Cage
2nd	(United States) Ryan Walker	Dragon	Cetrion
3rd	(Bahrain) Sayed Ahmed	Tekken Master	Geras, Erron Black, Kung Lao, Sonya Blade
4th	(United States) Julien Gorena	Deoxys	Geras
5th	(United States) Tommy Tweedy	Tweedy	Jacqui Briggs, Baraka, Geras
5th	(United Kingdom) Denom Jones	A F0xy Grampa	Shang Tsung, Kung Lao, Cassie Cage
7th	(United States) Andrew Fontanez	Semiij	Cassie Cage, Jacqui Briggs
7th	(Canada) Alexandre Dubé-Bilodeau	Hayatei	Erron Black

Samurai Shodown
Place	Player	Alias	Character(s)
1st	(South Korea) Seon-Woo Lee	Infiltration	Genjuro
2nd	(Japan) Ryota Inoue	Kazunoko	Haohmaru
3rd	(United States) Justin Wong	JWong	Tam Tam
4th	(United States) Reynald Tacsuan	Reynald	Genjuro, Haohmaru
5th	(Taiwan) Fu-Pin Kao	RB	Genjuro
5th	(United States) Alex Valle	CaliPower	Galford
7th	(Brazil) Renato Martins	Didimokof	Genjuro
7th	(Taiwan) Chia-Chen Tseng	ZJZ	Charlotte

Dragon Ball FighterZ
Place	Player	Alias	Character(s)
1st	(Japan) Goichi Kishida	Go1	Bardock/Goku/Kid Goku
2nd	(United States) Dominique McLean	SonicFox	Bardock/Kid Buu/Kid Goku
3rd	(Japan) Shoji Sho	Fenritti	Cell/Bardock/Vegeta
4th	(Spain) Joan Namay	Shanks	Android 18/Adult Gohan/Goku
5th	(Japan) unknown	Hirohiro	Android 17/Kid Goku/Teen Gohan
5th	(Japan) unknown	B	Kid Buu/Adult Gohan/Yamcha
7th	(United States) Christopher Gonzalez	NyChrisG	Teen Gohan/Tien/Yamcha
7th	(Japan) Ryota Inoue	Kazunoko	Kid Buu/Adult Gohan/Yamcha

Under Night In-Birth Exe:Late[st]
Place	Player	Alias	Character(s)
1st	(Japan) Masaru Higuchi	ClearLamp	Byakuya
2nd	(Japan) unknown	Oushuu-Hittou	Seth
3rd	(Japan) unknown	Hishigata	Nanase
4th	(Japan) unknown	Kure	Yuzuriha
5th	(Japan) Shinji Taharu	Neji	Mika
5th	(Canada) Andy La	Rikir	Enkidu
7th	(Japan) unknown	Senaru	Eltnum
7th	(Japan) unknown	Libekichi	Mika

Soulcalibur VI
Place	Player	Alias	Character(s)
1st	(Japan) Yuta Sudo	Yuttoto	Voldo
2nd	(United States) Zain Tibeishat	Bluegod	Azwel
3rd	(France) Jérémy Bernard	Oplon|Skyll	Mitsurugi
4th	(United States) Jonathan Vo	Woahhzz	Raphael
5th	(Singapore) Jovian Chan	Shen Chan	Cervantes
5th	(Japan) unknown	Tamonegi	Maxi
7th	(France) Marie-Laure Norindr	Kayane	Xianghua, 2B
7th	(United States) Joshua Vernon	Saiyne	Ivy
