= Atif Butt =

Atif Butt may refer to:

- Atif Butt (cricketer) (born 1969), Pakistani-born Danish cricketer
- Atif Butt (gamer), Pakistani professional esports player
