= Tekken 7 Nations Cup =

Three-day event in Riyadh, Saudi Arabia

- Sport: Esports
- No. of teams: 16
- Country: International
- Most recent champion: Pakistan

The Tekken 7 Nations Cup, held in Riyadh, Saudi Arabia, was a three-day event featured as part of the Gamers8 event organized by ESL and the Saudi-backed Savvy Group. Sixteen nations participated in the tournament, with each team consisting of three players, all vying for a prize pool of US$1 million.

During the group stage of the Tekken 7 Nations Cup, the sixteen teams were split into four groups, with each group comprising four teams. The winners of each group moved forward to the Winners Side, whereas the second-place finishers progressed to the Losers Side. The remaining teams were eliminated from the Main Event and participated in the Captain's Circle Tournament, a 1v1 single-elimination competition that included the eight teams eliminated during the group stage.

In the finale, Pakistan emerged as the victors of the Tekken 7 Nations Cup, triumphing over South Korea. With their impressive performance, Pakistan not only secured the championship title but also claimed the prestigious trophy along with a remarkable prize purse of $500,000.
