= Evo 2013 =

2013 Evolution Championship Series

Tournament information
- Location: Las Vegas, Nevada, United States
- Dates: July 12–14
- Tournament format(s): Double elimination
- Venue(s): Paris Las Vegas

Final positions
- Champions: SSF4AE2012: Kun Xian Ho; UMvC3: Job "Flocker" Figueroa; IGAU: Phillip "KDZ" Atkinson; SSBM: Joseph "Mang0" Marquez; KoFXIII: Reynald Tacsuan; SFxTv2013: Seon-woo "Infiltration" Lee; MK9: Denzell "DJT" Terry; P4A: Yume; TTT2: Jae-min "Knee" Bae

The 2013 Evolution Championship Series (commonly referred to as Evo 2013 or EVO 2013) was a fighting game event held at Paris Las Vegas on July 12–14. The event featured a major tournament for nine fighting games, including Super Street Fighter IV: Arcade Edition and Injustice: Gods Among Us. The event's Super Smash Bros. Melee livestream was controversially blocked by Nintendo of America, though the company decided to allow the tournament to be streamed after being faced with community backlash.

== Background ==
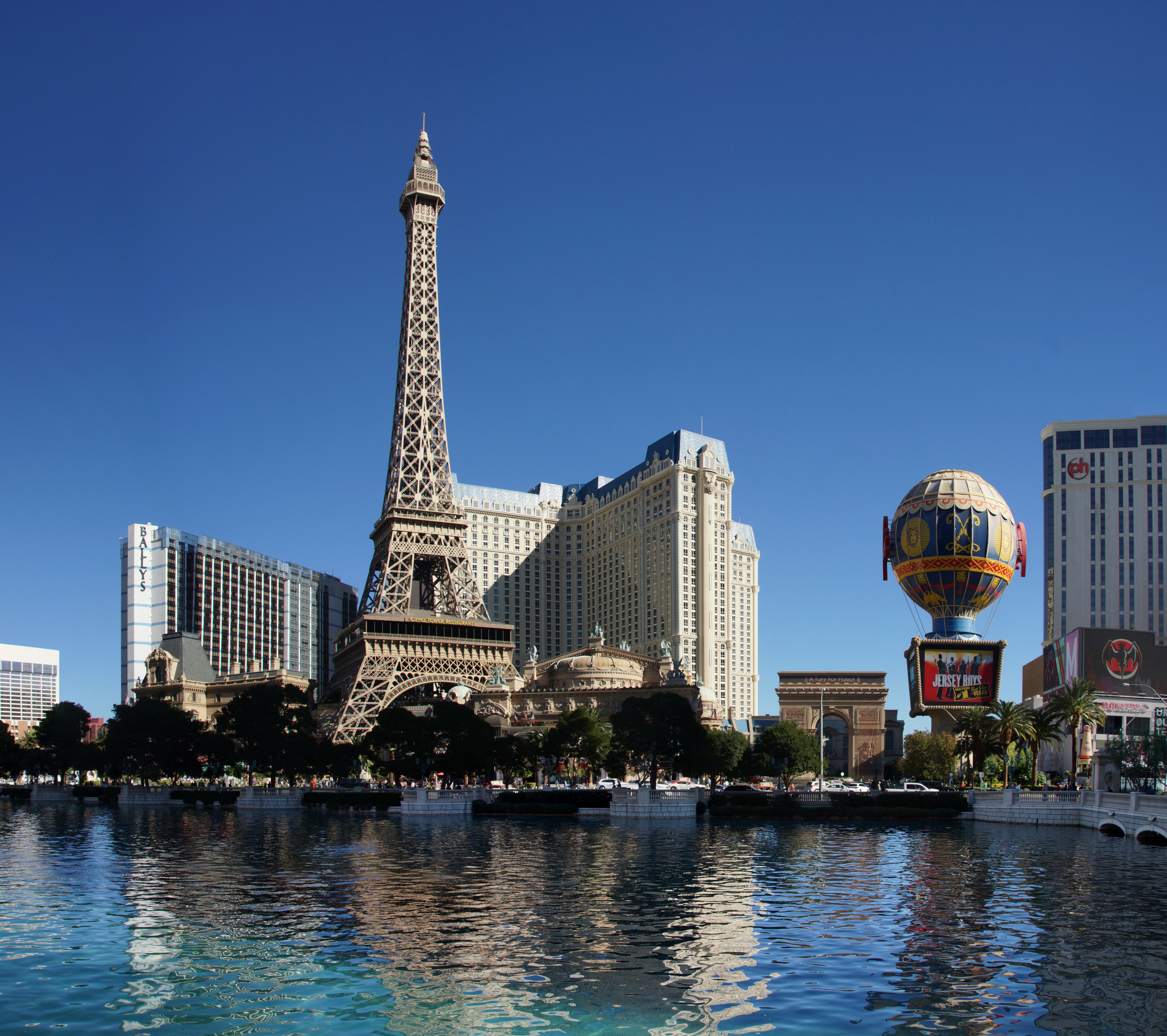
Evo 2013 took place in the ballrooms of Paris Las Vegas.

Evo 2013 took place on July 12 to 14 in the Bally's Event Center and Grand Ballroom of the Paris Las Vegas Hotel and Casino. The event featured open registration for its tournaments for the first time. However, attendees had to purchase entrance passes to access the building. Tournaments held at the event were livestreamed on Twitch. The tournament was broadcast simultaneously in Japan through streaming service Nico Nico Douga.

Tournaments at Evo 2013 had a total of 3,538 unique competitors, a record over previous years. Evo Co-Founder Tom Cannon noted that the Evolution Championship Series grew too large for Las Vegas ballrooms in 2012, and that the organization decided to charge for seating during Sunday finals in order to counter this issue.

== Games ==
Nine major tournaments were held at Evo 2013. The games played were:

- Super Street Fighter IV: Arcade Edition 2012
- Ultimate Marvel vs. Capcom 3
- Super Smash Bros. Melee
- Injustice: Gods Among Us
- King of Fighters XIII
- Tekken Tag Tournament 2
- Street Fighter X Tekken 2013
- Mortal Kombat
- Persona 4 Arena

Nintendo's 2001 fighting game Super Smash Bros. Melee was added to the 2013 Evo roster after a fan-funded donation drive. Fans of the game raised over $94,000 USD to be donated towards breast cancer research in order to have the game played competitively at the event. However, a week before the event was to start, Nintendo of America denied Evo organizers the right to livestream the Super Smash Bros. Melee tournament on Twitch. Evo founder Joey Cuellar stated on eSports show Live On Three that the company not only tried to shut down the livestream, but also the Melee tournament itself. Nintendo reverted this decision after being faced with community backlash on social media.

Injustice: Gods Among Us was added to the roster "at the last minute" after its publisher, Warner Bros, offered to help Evo with the logistical issue of adding a ninth major tournament to the event. Though the organization has always been conservative when adding new games to the roster, Cannon said the public response to the idea of Injustice being added to the roster was highly positive.

A Skullgirls side-tournament took place at the event after fans raised $78,000 USD during the charity drive. Cannon noted that there were multiple Super Street Fighter 2 Turbo tournaments held during Evo 2013. The event also held an indie game showcase for the first time, in which independent game developers display their works.

== Reveals ==
Capcom announced during a break in the Street Fighter tournament that the company would release four new characters for Super Street Fighter IV: Hugo, Poison, Rolento, and Elena, as a $15 USD add-on. Shortly before the tournament finals kicked off, Capcom revealed Ultra Street Fighter IV. During a presentation of Killer Instinct (2013), the crowd started booing when the Xbox One was mentioned as the game's exclusive console.

Warner Bros. announced Martian Manhunter as the fifth DLC character for Injustice: Gods Among Us along with a John Stewart costume for Green Lantern, with Phil LaMarr voicing Stewart.

== Tournament summary ==
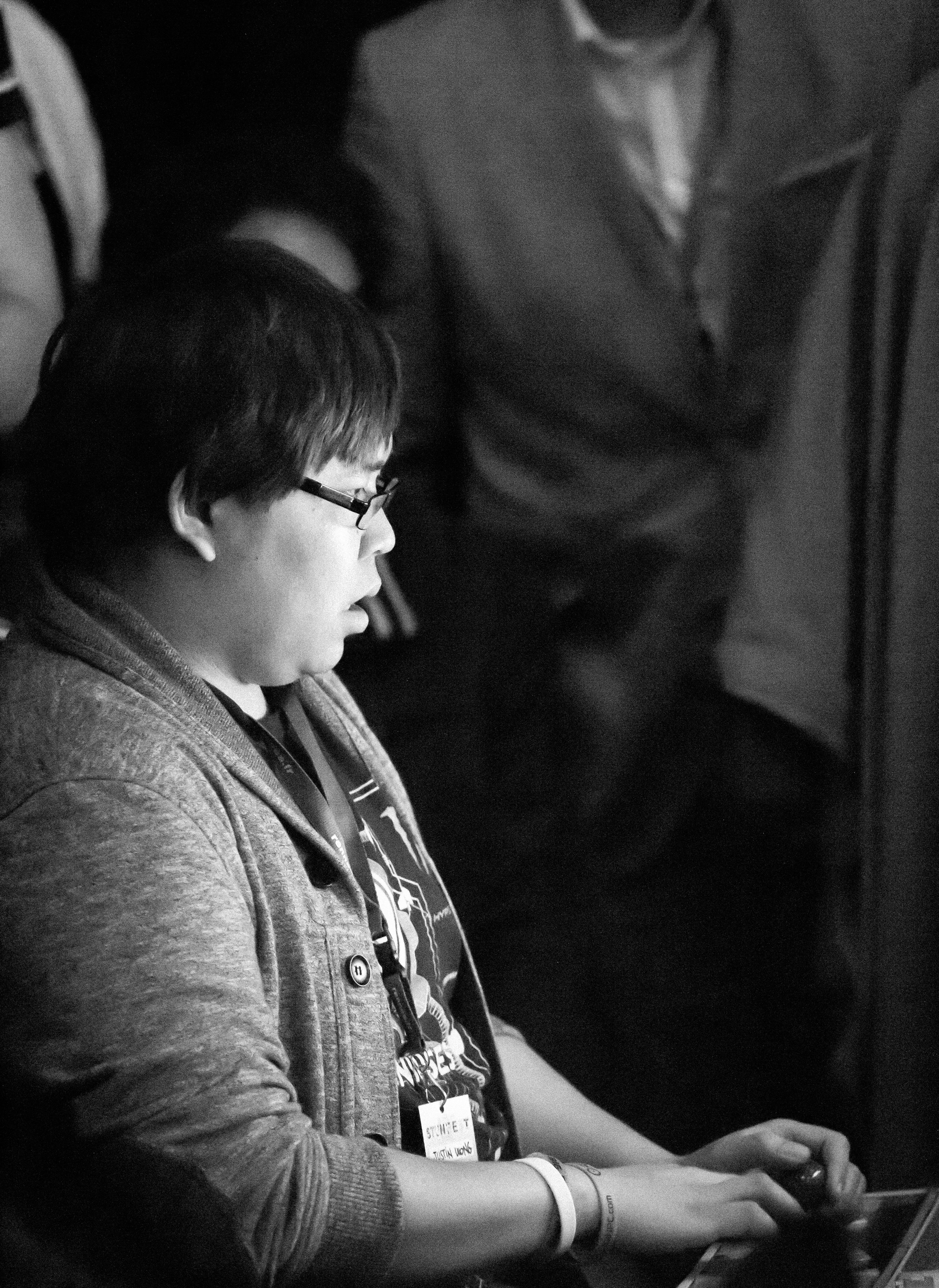
Justin Wong came in second in the Marvel vs Capcom tournament at Evo 2013.

The Street Fighter tournament at Evo 2013 finished off with Kun Xian Ho beating Tokido in the Grand Finals. Playing as Gen, Xian came in from the winner's bracket and defeated Tokido's Akuma without a bracket reset.

The Ultimate Marvel vs. Capcom 3 tournament featured various moments that were described as highly thrilling. The tournament was won by Job "Flocker" Figueroa, though second-place finisher Justin Wong received attention for his run through the tournament, including resetting the grand final after being sent to loser's bracket by Flocker and forcing a close final game in the grand finals reset. The Street Fighter X Tekken tournament was won by Infiltration for the second year in a row, beating Justin Wong in the finals. Infiltration's more aggressive playstyle proved effective against Wong's more conservative style.

== Results ==
Super Street Fighter IV: Arcade Edition (Version 2012)
Place	Player	Alias	Character(s)
1st	(Singapore) Kun Xian Ho	DM.MCZ|Xian	Gen
2nd	(Japan) Hajime Taniguchi	MCZ|Tokido	Akuma
3rd	(South Korea) Seon-Woo Lee	Infiltration	Akuma, Hakan, Ryu
4th	(United States) Eduardo Pérez-Frangie	EG|PR Balrog	Balrog, Fei Long
5th	(Japan) Naoto Sako	HORI|Sako	Ibuki, Evil Ryu
5th	(Japan) Tatsuya Haitani	Haitani	Makoto
7th	(Japan) Daigo Umehara	MCZ|Daigo Umehara	Ryu
7th	(Taiwan) Bruce Hsiang	AVM|GamerBee	Adon

Ultimate Marvel vs. Capcom 3
Place	Player	Alias	Character(s)
1st	(United States) Job Figueroa	FS.EMP|Flocker	Zero/Vergil/Hawkeye
2nd	(United States) Justin Wong	EG|Justin Wong	Wolverine/Storm/Akuma, Wolverine/Spencer/Frank West
3rd	(United States) Armando Mejia	Angelic	Wolverine/Dormammu/Shuma-Gorath
4th	(United States) Jonathan Morales	Cloud805	Zero/Vergil/Dante
5th	(United States) Ryan Ramirez	coL|Filipino Champ	Magneto/Doctor Doom/Phoenix, Magneto/Dormammu/Doctor Doom
5th	(United States) Christopher Gonzalez	AGE|NYChrisG	Morrigan/Doctor Doom/Vergil, Morrigan/Magneto/Doctor Doom, Amaterasu/Morrigan/Phoenix
7th	(United States) Vu Tra	Ranmasama	Haggar/Dormammu/Magneto
7th	(Peru) Zack Fernandez	ATX|Zack	Zero/Vergil/Dante

Injustice: Gods Among Us
Place	Player	Alias	Character(s)
1st	(United States) Phillip Atkinson	VxG.EMP|KDZ	Superman
2nd	(United States) Denzell Terry	Crazy DJT 88	Green Lantern, Doomsday
3rd	(United States) Christopher Gonzalez	AGE|NYChrisG	Green Arrow, Black Adam
4th	(United States) Frank Amaral	EGP.FLK|MF Slayer909	Superman, Wonder Woman
5th	(United States) Jivan Karapetian	EMPR|Theo	Superman
5th	(United States) Dustin Kane	RDK|Godspeed	Black Adam, Aquaman
7th	(United States) Giuseppe Grosso	VxG.EMP|REO	Batman
7th	(United States) Eduardo Pérez-Frangie	EG|PR Balrog	Killer Frost

Super Smash Bros. Melee
Place	Player	Alias	Character(s)
1st	(United States) Joseph Marquez	MIOM|Mang0	Fox, Falco
2nd	(United States) Robert Wright	Wobbles	Ice Climbers
3rd	(United States) Juan Debiedma	CT|Hungrybox	Jigglypuff
4th	(Sweden) Adam Lindgren	Armada	Peach
5th	(United States) Kevin Nanney	VGBC|Dr. PeePee	Falco
5th	(United States) Jason Zimmerman	CT.EMP|Mew2King	Fox, Sheik, Marth
7th	(United States) DaJuan McDaniel	Shroomed	Dr. Mario
7th	(Germany) Mustafa Akcakaya	Ice	Sheik, Zelda

The King of Fighters XIII
Place	Player	Alias	Character(s)
1st	(United States) Reynald Tacsuan	AS|Reynald	EX Kyo/Benimaru/Chin, EX Kyo/Benimaru/Kim, Kim/Benimaru/Chin, Benimaru/Takuma/Chin
2nd	(Japan) Hee San Woo	Woo	Ryo/Kim/Mai, Ryo/Takuma/Kim
3rd	(South Korea) Kwang-noh Lee	CafeId.RZR|MadKOF	King/Shen/Kim, Duo Lon/King/Kim, Duo Lon/Kim/Shen
4th	(Japan) Hajime Taniguchi	MCZ|Tokido	EX Iori/Mr. Karate/Kim
5th	(South Korea) Min-su Shin	CafeId.RZR|Verna	Duo Lon/Mr. Karate/Kim, Duo Lon/Mr. Karate/Iori
5th	(Singapore) Kun Xian Ho	DM.MCZ|Xian	EX Iori/Mr. Karate/EX Kyo, Elisabeth/EX Iori/EX Kyo
7th	(Mexico) Jose Navarrete	AGE|Romance	King/Yuri/Benimaru
7th	(France) Marvin Forestal	Fox	Ryo/Mr. Karate/Chin, Chin/Mr. Karate/Iori

Street Fighter X Tekken (Version 2013)
Place	Player	Alias	Character(s)
1st	(South Korea) Seon-Woo Lee	Infiltration	Jin/Alisa
2nd	(United States) Justin Wong	EG|Justin Wong	Hwoarang/Chun-Li
3rd	(Japan) Joe Egami	MOV	Law/Cammy, Law/Nina
4th	(United States) Alex Valle	LU|Alex Valle	Yoshimitsu/Lars
5th	(United States) Anthony Millare	TZA	Chun-Li/Law
5th	(South Korea) Chung-gon Lee	CafeId|Poongko	Nina/Kazuya, Ryu/Kazuya
7th	(United States) David-Paul Mattock	KS|Jibbo	Sagat/Jin
7th	(Japan) Kouhei Tamura	Esuta	Law/King, Law/Bob

Mortal Kombat
Place	Player	Alias	Character(s)
1st	(United States) Denzell Terry	Crazy DJT 88	Cyrax
2nd	(United States) Giuseppe Grosso	VxG.EMP|REO	Kabal
3rd	(United States) Lenin Castillo	My God 88	Sonya, Liu Kang
4th	(United States) Christian Quiles	Forever King 88	Kung Lao, Kenshi
5th	(United States) Stephanie Brownback	GGA|16 Bit	Kitana
5th	(United States) Carl White	Fnatic|Perfect Legend	Kung Lao, Kabal
7th	(United States) Ryan Gonzalez	Wound Cowboy 88	Shang Tsung
7th	(United States) Alex Rayis	RDK.CORN|DetroitBalln	Kabal

Persona 4 Arena
Place	Player	Alias	Character(s)
1st	(Japan)	Yume	Aigis
2nd	(United States) Steve Barthelemy	Lord Knight	Mitsuru Kirijo
3rd	(United States) Jose Llera	BananaKen	Shadow Labrys
4th	(United States) Eddie Sayles	Brkrdave	Teddie
5th	(Japan) Chuan He	Stunedge	Yukiko Amagi
5th	(Japan) Daisuke Sekine	DIE-chan	Mitsuru Kirijo
7th	(Japan) Seitaro Ono	Domi	Akihiko Sanada
7th	(United States) Alex Chen	Spark	Teddie

Tekken Tag Tournament 2
Place	Player	Alias	Character(s)
1st	(South Korea) Jae-min Bae	CafeId|Knee	Devil Jin/Bruce, Dragunov/Marduk, Heihachi/Lars
2nd	(United States) Bronson Tran	Eightarc|Bronson	Ogre/Jinpachi
3rd	(United States) Michael Ramos	AGE|StringBean	Bob/Alisa
4th	(South Korea) Hyun-kyu Park	CafeId|NIN	Devil Jin/Lars, Steve/Marduk
5th	(United States) James Garrett	AGE|JustFrame James	Yoshimitsu/Marshall Law, Hwoarang/Marshall Law
5th	(United States) Mohammed Kayyal	MoneyInc|Kayyal	King/Armor King
7th	(United States) Matthew Szabo	Eightarc|Mateo	Jack-6/Feng, Bob/Slim Bob
7th	(United States) Eduardo Ignacio	MoneyInc|EddieBoyMang	Christie/Eddy
