= Guilty Gear Strive =

2021 video game

- Cover art featuring Sol Badguy (Left) and Ky Kiske (Right)
- Developer: Arc System Works
- Publishers: WW: Arc System Works; PAL: Bandai Namco Entertainment; JP: Sega (Arcade)
- Director: Akira Katano
- Designer: Daisuke Ishiwatari
- Artist: Hidehiko Sakamura
- Composer: Daisuke Ishiwatari
- Series: Guilty Gear
- Engine: Unreal Engine 4
- Platforms: PlayStation 4; PlayStation 5; Windows; Arcade; Xbox One; Xbox Series X/S; Nintendo Switch
- Release: PS4, PS5, Windows: WW: June 11, 2021; Arcade: JP: July 29, 2021; Xbox One, Series X/S: WW: March 7, 2023; Nintendo Switch: WW: January 23, 2025
- Genre: Fighting
- Modes: Single-player, multiplayer
- Arcade system: ALL.Net P-ras MULTI Ver.3

Guilty Gear Strive (Note: Japanese: ギルティギア ストライヴ, Hepburn: Giruti Gia Sutoraivu) (stylized as GUILTY GEAR -STRIVE-) is a 2021 fighting game developed and published by Arc System Works. It is the seventh mainline installment in the Guilty Gear series and the 25th overall. The game was released for PlayStation 4, PlayStation 5 and Windows in June 2021, for Japanese arcades in July 2021, and for Xbox One and Xbox Series X/S in March 2023, with a Nintendo Switch port released in January 2025.

Guilty Gear Strive received generally positive reviews from critics, who praised its visuals, gameplay and netcode. It has sold 4 million copies as of June 2026.

== Gameplay ==
Intended as a "complete reconstruction of the franchise", Guilty Gear Strive retains the core essence of the series but revamps many features and mechanics, except for the removal of the series’ signature mechanic, the Instant Kill. It introduces the "Wall Break" feature, which allows for stage transitions when a combo is initiated in the corner of the arena.

== Synopsis ==
The story continues after the events of Guilty Gear Xrd. It is the conclusion of Sol Badguy's story (A.K.A. The Gear Hunters Saga), set in Washington, D.C., featuring his final confrontation with That Man, Asuka R. Kreutz.

=== Main story ===
Three weeks after former Sanctus Populi Ariels is defeated, I-No frees the powerful magic-user Happy Chaos from her body. Asuka turns himself in to U.S. president Colin Vernon E. Groubitz, intending to join the White House's G4 peace summit from a holding cell and ask the other nations for assistance in ridding the world of the Tome of Origin and Sol Badguy. The world's leaders fear an attack from I-No and hire knights from each country, including Sol Badguy, now the world's renowned Gear hero who remains a bounty hunter. Sol and his lover, Jack-O', plan to refuse, but accept after noting Ariels' warning about I-No and Chaos' plot. After releasing and brainwashing the samurai Nagoriyuki, I-No surrenders herself to the Illyria police, convincing the world that it is safe to hold the summit. However, Sol and Jack-O notice something wrong and attempt to capture Chaos, but realize that Chaos created weapons using materials from Nagoriyuki's blade, which can kill Gears and other immortal beings. During an interrogation, I-No claims to remember a kind blonde man from her past. In private, Jack-O' reveals to Sol and Ky Kiske that I-No is "incomplete" and must join with her other half to achieve godhood. She suggests sacrificing herself to turn I-No into a regular human, but Sol refuses.

Realizing something will happen at G4, Sol leaves for the U.S. with the third Illyrian King Daryl, while Millia Rage and Zato-1 are enlisted by Daryl to aid the second Illyrian King Leo Whitefang's investigation. During the summit, Chaos brainwashes the White House guards and holds the dignitaries hostage, though Sol and Vernon, the only ones who can open Asuka's cell, manage to escape and request reinforcements from Zepp and Illyria. After Chaos activates the White House's aircraft mode, "Tír na nÓg", Asuka realizes Chaos is "the original," the man responsible for bringing magic to the world and Asuka's former teacher. After learning what Chaos will do with the Tome, Daryl manages to convince the fallen sorcerer to release him and the rest of the dignitaries barring Vernon, Sol, and Asuka, including surviving agent Giovanna. Chipp Zanuff and Anji Mito sneak into the Department of Defense to confirm their allies of Chaos' other identity as another That Man, and the true culprit who had orchestrated the ongoing Crusades. They theorize Chaos intends to fly the White House into Mexico, where it will be shot down, so Chaos can dig the Tome out of the ashes. Sol confronts Nagoriyuki in an attempt to learn Chaos' weakness, but Nagoriyuki lets himself be defeated to free himself from Chaos' control. Asuka tricks Chaos into locking himself in an escape pod and ejecting onto the Earth below.

Ky and Jack-O' arrive at the White House, where Asuka explains he intends to take the Tome and spend the rest of his life on the moon. Asuka reveals he planned to remove the Flame of Corruption from Sol's body, allowing Sol to live a normal life as "Frederick Bulsara", and reconcile their friendship. Soldiers on the ground find that the "Chaos" in the escape pod is a brainwashed guard, and the real Chaos is still on the ship. Chaos steals the real Tome from Asuka's body and uses it to fuse with I-No, granting her godhood. I-No defeats the heroes and announces her intent to share her powers with the world, likely destroying it. Jack-O' attempts to sacrifice herself to stop I-No, but Aria's spirit convinces her to live for herself. Ky and Axl Low distract I-No while Vernon and Sol uses several Spiritas 48 batteries hidden in the Oval Office to strengthen his Outrage sword into a laser cannon. Nagoriyuki reveals Chaos' true weakness is on his right palm and helps Sol land the shot, mortally wounding I-No. In her last moments, I-No realizes Axl was the blonde man from her past and dies happy.

In the aftermath, "Sol" is given a funeral, having retired as a scientist under his original name, Frederick. He lives with Jack-O' and works on a rocket to visit Asuka, who now hosts a radio show. Axl reunites with Megumi, his lover from the past and I-No's alternate past-self, implied to have received time travel abilities from her fallen future counterpart. In a post-credits scene, Chaos appears alone on an unknown beach.

=== Another Story ===
While the incident in America triggered by Asuka R. Kreutz’s surrender unfolds, Ramlethal Valentine, now a Special Brigade Commander of Illyria, heads to the outskirts of the country after receiving a report of an emergency. There she finds a girl who closely resembles the late Bedman, who once worked with the possessed Universal Will/Ariels against mankind. That girl is Delilah, Bedman's sister who woke up after the death of her brother, now seeking to avenge her late brother by killing Happy Chaos. As the one-eyed and one-armed samurai woman Baiken learned from Anji and Chipp about who Happy Chaos was, including his involvement on murdering her family, she was entrusted to look over Delilah by Anji, much to her dismay. However, the young girl ran away from Baiken, when Chaos activated "Tír na nÓg" during his invasion there.

Baiken gets an unexpected reinforcement from Sin Kiske, the son of Ky Kiske and Dizzy, now a knight of Illyria who accompanies Ramlethal on her mission while still retaining his royal status because of his parents’ current reputations. Baiken, Sin and Ramlethal enlist Faust, May and April to assist them in stopping Delilah from endangering herself, because her power is unstable and would turn her into a suicide bomber. With the help of Bedman, whose soul now lives in his weaponized bed, Faust is able to administer a cure to permanently negate Delilah's self destruct power at the cost of finally sacrificing Bedman and weakening Faust.

Sometime after the White House incident ended, the G4 World Peace summit succeeds, and Delilah is cured. The main Kiske family members (Ky, Dizzy and Sin) greet the people of Illyria during an official peaceful ceremony.

== Characters ==
Characters listed in bold are new to the series, while guest characters are marked in italics.

Base roster	Season Pass 1	Season Pass 2	Season Pass 3	Season Pass 4	Season Pass 5
Sol Badguy; Ky Kiske; May; Axl Low; Chipp Zanuff; Potemkin; Faust; Millia Rage; Zato-1; **Giovanna**; Ramlethal Valentine; Leo Whitefang; **Nagoriyuki**; Anji Mito; I-No	**Goldlewis Dickinson**; Jack-O'; **Happy Chaos**; Baiken; Testament	Bridget; Sin Kiske; **Bedman?**; **Asuka R♯ /** **Asuka R. Kreutz** (Note: The symbol ♯ is pronounced as "kreuz", in German language. There is an option to switch between Asuka R♯ and Asuka R. Kreutz in the game, which only change the characters' names and titles without changing any of the gameplay.)	Johnny; Elphelt Valentine; A.B.A; Slayer	Queen Dizzy; Venom; **Unika**; **Lucy Kushinada**	Jam Kuradoberi; Robo-Ky

The game features fifteen playable characters in its base roster, consisting of 13 returning characters from previous installments, and two new characters: Nagoriyuki, a Nightless vampire samurai who can drain opponents of their blood to increase his attack power; and Giovanna, a special operations unit officer who is accompanied by her wolf spirit, Rei.

New characters have been released as downloadable content via multiple season passes; five seasons of content are currently available. Some of these characters first appeared in the story mode prior to becoming DLC characters. Currently, the DLC roster consists of 11 returning characters from previous installments, and five new characters: Goldlewis Dickinson, an American secretary who fights with an alien-like partner who is inside a coffin dubbed "U.M.A"; Happy Chaos, the overarching series antagonist; the late Bedman's now sentient weaponized bed frame (dubbed "Bedman?"), who is accompanied by his surviving sister, Delilah Neumann; Asuka R. Kreutz, a recurring non-player character from previous games; and Unika, a character who debuted in Guilty Gear Strive: Dual Rulers anime series and revealed to be Dizzy and Ky's second child from an alternate future. Strive's DLC also adds the series' first guest character, Lucy Kushinada from the anime Cyberpunk: Edgerunners.

== Development ==
After a new installment in the Guilty Gear series was confirmed to be in development at EVO 2018 by Arc System Works, the game had its worldwide reveal and announcement trailer under the working title New Guilty Gear, showcasing the new Unreal Engine 4 graphics and Wall Break mechanic in EVO 2019. Two days later, the game's main theme song, "Smell of the Game", was fully revealed as a promotional single. The title Guilty Gear Strive was revealed in a trailer in November 2019.

According to director Akira Katano, the team aimed to appeal to more players by making the gameplay of Strive easier to comprehend compared to previous Guilty Gear games, instead of making it easier. He reasoned that with many fighting games, spectators and casual players would have a hard time understanding higher level play and lose interest in watching or improving. Unlike other entries, detailed explanations of the game's mechanics are absent from the game's tutorial as to "[...] show new players that it is possible to enjoy fighting games without knowing about the battle mechanics [...]". The game's network play also did not include a ranked mode at launch, a gameplay mode in video games that matches players based on their skill level, as to allow players to play at their own pace, instead of being forced to constantly improve.

The game was delayed in May 2020 to an unspecified 2021 release date due to the impact of the COVID-19 pandemic. After its first public beta went live during February 2021, the game was delayed from April 9, 2021, to June 11, with the development team citing adjustments to certain aspects of the game based on fan feedback for the reason behind its second delay. A second public beta was held during May 2021 to gather additional feedback. During the public beta phase, the game's netcode was highly praised by players.

The game was initially planned to be available at Japanese arcades on the same day as the home versions. In June 2021, Arc System Works has announced that the arcade release would be delayed, as testing the game on store locations proved difficult during the COVID-19 pandemic.

== Release ==
Guilty Gear Strive released for the PlayStation 4, PlayStation 5, and Microsoft Windows on June 11, 2021. It was also distributed via Sega to Japanese arcades on July 29, 2021. "Limited Edition" and "Ultimate Edition" editions were made available for pre-order; console players who get the latter received early access to the full game on June 8, 2021. Cross-platform play was only supported between the PlayStation 4 and PlayStation 5 versions at launch. Cross-play with the Windows version is set to be added as an update alongside the Season Pass 2. Ver. 1.05 added Korean voices, marking the 3rd game in the franchise to have a Korean dub, alongside Guilty Gear X Plus and Guilty Gear X2 #Reload. Versions for Xbox One and Xbox Series X/S were announced at Tokyo Game Show 2022, and were released on March 7, 2023. A port for Nintendo Switch was announced in August 2024 at PAX West, and was released on January 23, 2025.

=== Post-launch support ===
More characters are planned for release as downloadable content, with five announced for Season Pass 1 on June 6, 2021, and four announced for Season Passes 2, 3 and 4 on August 7, 2022, August 24, 2023 and August July 21, 2024 respectively. Guilty Gear Strive 2.00 and Season Pass 5 were announced on August 3, 2025.

- The first Season Pass 1 fighter, released on July 27, 2021, is Goldlewis Dickinson, the right-hand man of U.S. President Colin Vernon E. Groubitz, who fights alongside an alien spirit-filled coffin codenamed "Area 51 U.M.A.". The second fighter, released on August 27, 2021, is Jack-O', who debuted in Xrd. The third fighter, released on November 30, 2021, is the overarching antagonist of the series who was formally introduced in Strive, Happy Chaos. The fourth fighter, released on January 28, 2022, is Baiken, who debuted in the original Guilty Gear and last appeared in Rev 2 as DLC fighter. The last fighter for Season Pass 1 was revealed to be Testament, whose last appearance was in X2, released on March 31, 2022.
- The first Season Pass 2 fighter, announced on August 7, 2022, is Bridget, whose last appearance was in X2; the character was then released the day after on August 8, 2022. The second fighter, released on November 24, 2022, is Sin Kiske, who debuted in the fourth game Overture and last appeared in Xrd as DLC fighter. The third fighter, referred to as "Bedman?", is in fact Bedman’s sentient weaponized bed robot accompanied by his sister Delilah, and was released on April 6, 2023. The fourth and final fighter, Asuka R. Kreutz, the former series antagonist, was released on May 25, 2023, with his decoy clone, Asuka R♯, appearing as his default color palette.
- In the 2023 Arc World Tour Finals, the developers also confirmed that the third Season Pass has been in development. Later, at Evo 2023 on August 7, 2023, the first Season Pass 3 fighter, Johnny was announced; the character was released on August 24, 2023. The second fighter, Elphelt Valentine was announced at The Game Awards 2023 on December 7, 2023; she was released a day later on December 8, 2023. The third character, A.B.A, released on March 26, 2024. The fourth and final Season Pass 3 character was announced at the 2024 Arc World Tour finals, and was later confirmed to be Slayer, released on May 30, 2024.
- During the 2024 Arc World Tour Finals, it was also announced that a fourth Season Pass was in development. The full contents of the pass were revealed during Evo 2024 on July 21, 2024, to be released throughout the coming year. Characters include returning fighters Dizzy and Venom; Unika, a new character created for the Guilty Gear Strive: Dual Rulers anime series; and Lucy Kushinada, a guest character from the 2022 anime series Cyberpunk: Edgerunners.
- During Evo 2025 on August 3, 2025, the gameplay trailer for Lucy was revealed along with the announcement of the Guilty Gear Strive 2.00 update. Later, during the 2025 Arc World Tour Finals on March 22, 2026, the trailer for Guilty Gear Strive 2.00 was showcased alongside the reveal of Jam Kuradoberi with the announcement that Robo-Ky would be the next addition to the roster following Jam. Various gameplay changes and quality of life features were announced along with the introduction of cosmetics and a Blazing Pass.

== Reception ==
Reception

Aggregate scores
Aggregator	Score
Metacritic	PC: 85/100; PS4: 84/100; PS5: 87/100
OpenCritic	95% recommend

Review scores
Publication	Score
Destructoid	8.5/10
Eurogamer	Recommended
Famitsu	34/40
GameSpot	8/10
IGN	9/10
Jeuxvideo.com	16/20
Push Square	9/10

Guilty Gear Strive received "generally favorable" reviews, according to review aggregator Metacritic. OpenCritic determined that 95% of critics recommend the game. IGN said "Guilty Gear Strive is a milestone 2D fighting game that raises the bar for anime-like fighters in terms of its visuals, online netcode, and sheer creativity found in all aspects of its design." GameSpot said "If you're up for a challenge, or just want a cool, sharp-looking fighting game to mess around with, Strive knows all the right moves."

Guilty Gear Strive won awards for Best Fighting Game at The Game Awards 2021 and Fighting Game of the Year at the 25th Annual D.I.C.E. Awards.

=== Sales ===
The PlayStation 4 version of Guilty Gear: Strive sold 11,722 physical copies during its first week of release in Japan, making it the eighth bestselling retail game of the week in the country. During the same week, the PlayStation 5 version was the twenty-second bestselling retail game in Japan, with 3,547 physical copies being sold.

The game entered the UK physical charts at number 26. On Steam, the number of concurrent players reached a peak of 30,939, surpassing both Street Fighter V and Tekken 7.

The game sold 500,000 copies as of July 2021 and has sold one million copies as of August 2022, becoming the best-selling title of the franchise. As of June 2026, it has sold more than 4 million copies.

== Anime ==
A anime television series adaptation titled Guilty Gear Strive: Dual Rulers was announced on June 14, 2024. The series was produced by Sanzigen and directed by Shigeru Morikawa, with Seiji Mizushima serving as associate producer, Norimitsu Kaihō overseeing and writing series scripts, and Ryo Takahashi composing the music. It takes place after the game's two storylines and serves as an introduction to the character Unika. The series aired from April 5 to May 24, 2025, on Tokyo MX and other networks. The opening theme song is "AXCLUSION", performed by rock band ulma sound junction and the ending theme is "Arika" by Nowlu. Crunchyroll licensed the series.

A series of comedic animated shorts, titled The Melancholy of Erica Bartholomew, were released on the Arc System Works YouTube channel in August 2026. The shorts follow the daily life of the vice president, Erica Bartholomew, as she is secretly aided by the UMA living in Goldlewis's coffin.
