= Evo 2009 =

2009 Evolution Championship Series

Tournament information
- Location: Las Vegas, Nevada, United States
- Dates: July 17–19
- Tournament format: Double elimination
- Venue: Rio All Suite Hotel and Casino

The 2009 Evolution Championship Series (commonly referred to as Evo 2009 or EVO 2009) was a fighting game event held in Rio Las Vegas on July 17–19. The event featured major tournaments for various fighting games, including Super Street Fighter IV and Marvel vs. Capcom 2. The release of Super Street Fighter IV drew many new players to the tournament scene, and Evo 2009 is remembered as one of the biggest years of Evolution's growth.

== Event overview ==
"The mix of white, black, Hispanic, and Asian players seems so even it doesn't seem like anyone is a minority anymore. And also unlike most game-centered events, long hair, tattoos, piercings, and muscles abound. ... The view down the wall makes the players at over 2 dozen monitors look like a NASA crew. Each station has a dozen or two people crowding around, players waiting to hear their names be called, supporters not wanting to miss the match of a friend."

— –Michael Walbridge, GameSetWatch

Evo 2009 was held on July 17–19 in the Rio All Suite Hotel and Casino. It was the biggest instance of the event up to that point, featuring over 1,000 competitors for its Street Fighter IV tournament. 23,000 people watched the event through a live feed. Capcom made the latest version of Tatsunoko vs. Capcom available to be played at the event, and revealed their first public build of Marvel vs. Capcom 2 for PlayStation 3 and Xbox 360.^{:2} Bandai Namco had set up a handful of TVs for attendees to demo the to-be-released Tekken 6, and Aksys Games held a signing session. Street Fighter players Mike Ross and Mike Watson interviewed early 1990s Street Fighter 2 champion Tomo Ohira. The organizers of the event, Tony and Tom Cannon, were interviewed by Victor Ratliff, who bestowed the two brothers the "Cannon award" in recognition of their work organizing Evo, running the website Shuryuken, and creating a GGPO netcode that allowed the community to play games such as BlazBlue online.^{:5}

Mad Catz-brand arcade sticks began hitting the market in 2008, and reached unprecedented popularity among the fighting game community after the release of a Street Fighter IV range of products in 2009. Mad Catz employee Mark Julio said he was blown away seeing the community "flooded" with Mad Catz Street Fighter IV arcade sticks at Evo 2009.

== Tournaments ==
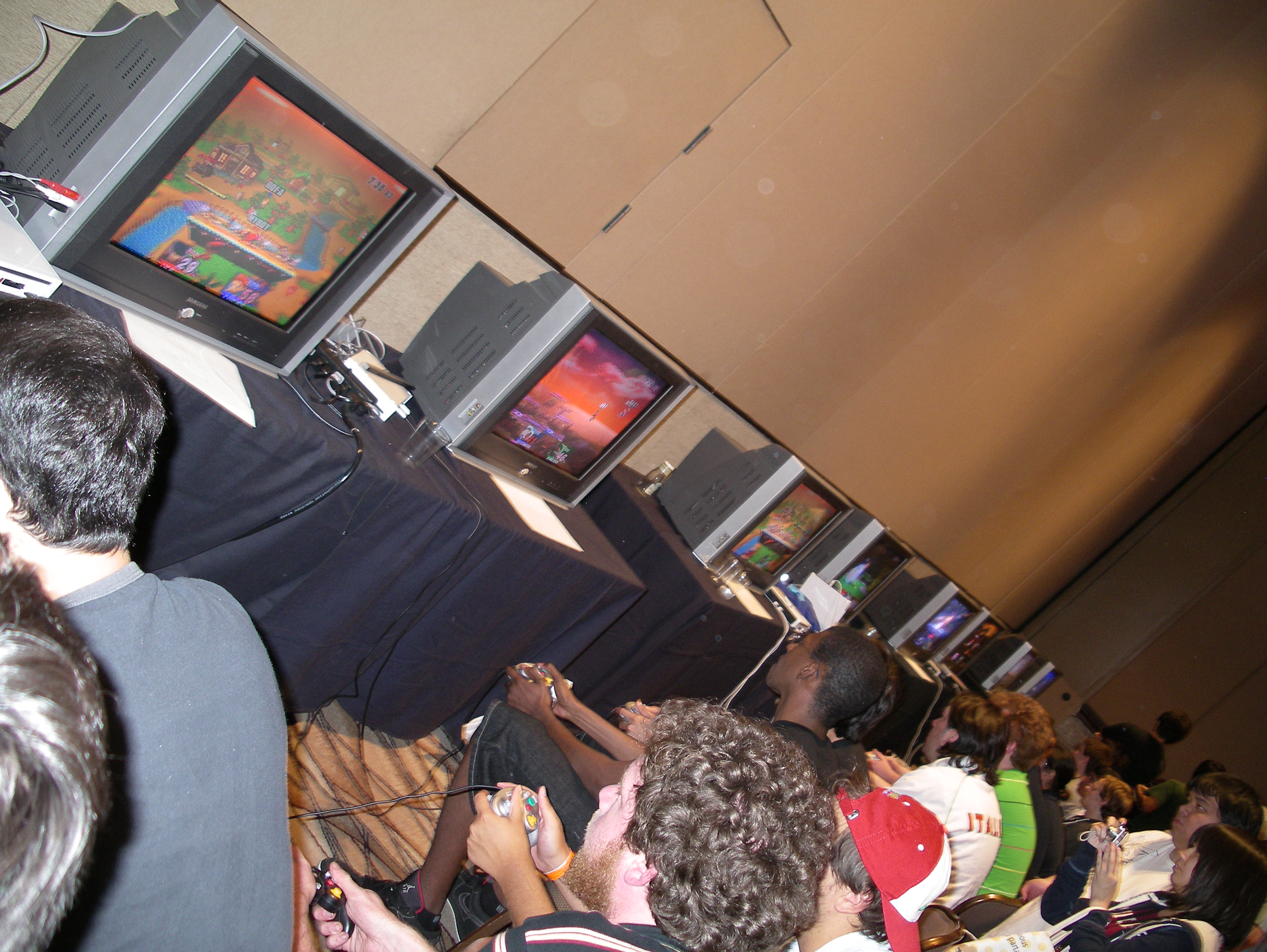
People playing Super Smash Bros. Brawl at the "bring your own console"-area.

Evo 2009 featured major tournaments for various fighting games, such as 1v1 tournaments of Street Fighter IV, Marvel vs. Capcom 2, Soulcalibur IV, and Guilty Gear XX Accent Core, both a 1v1 and 2v2 tournament of Super Street Fighter II Turbo HD Remix, a 2v2 tournament of Street Fighter III: Third Strike, and a 1v1 invitational tournament of the then-unlocalized game Tatsunoko vs. Capcom.

Nearly half of the "bring your own console"-area at Evo 2009 was dedicated to Super Smash Bros. Brawl tournaments, run by AllisBrawl.com. Unlike the previous year, the Brawl tournaments at Evo 2009 were held with a community-defined ruleset, which was favored by the competitors. Other side-tournaments at the event were held by companies such as Bandai Namco and AkSys Games, who received a lot of support from Evolution's organizers. Unlike previous years, both the BlazBlue and Tekken 6 tournaments were held on the final day of the event, so they could be displayed on the big screen alongside the Marvel vs. Capcom and Street Fighter IV finals.^{:4}

Tournaments held on a PlayStation 3 set-up experienced various technical difficulties, such as wireless controller synchronization issues, dangling cables of wired controllers disconnecting during matches, and software glitches. Delays were also a big issue during the event, with some tournaments starting much later than planned.^{:6}

=== Street Fighter IV finals ===
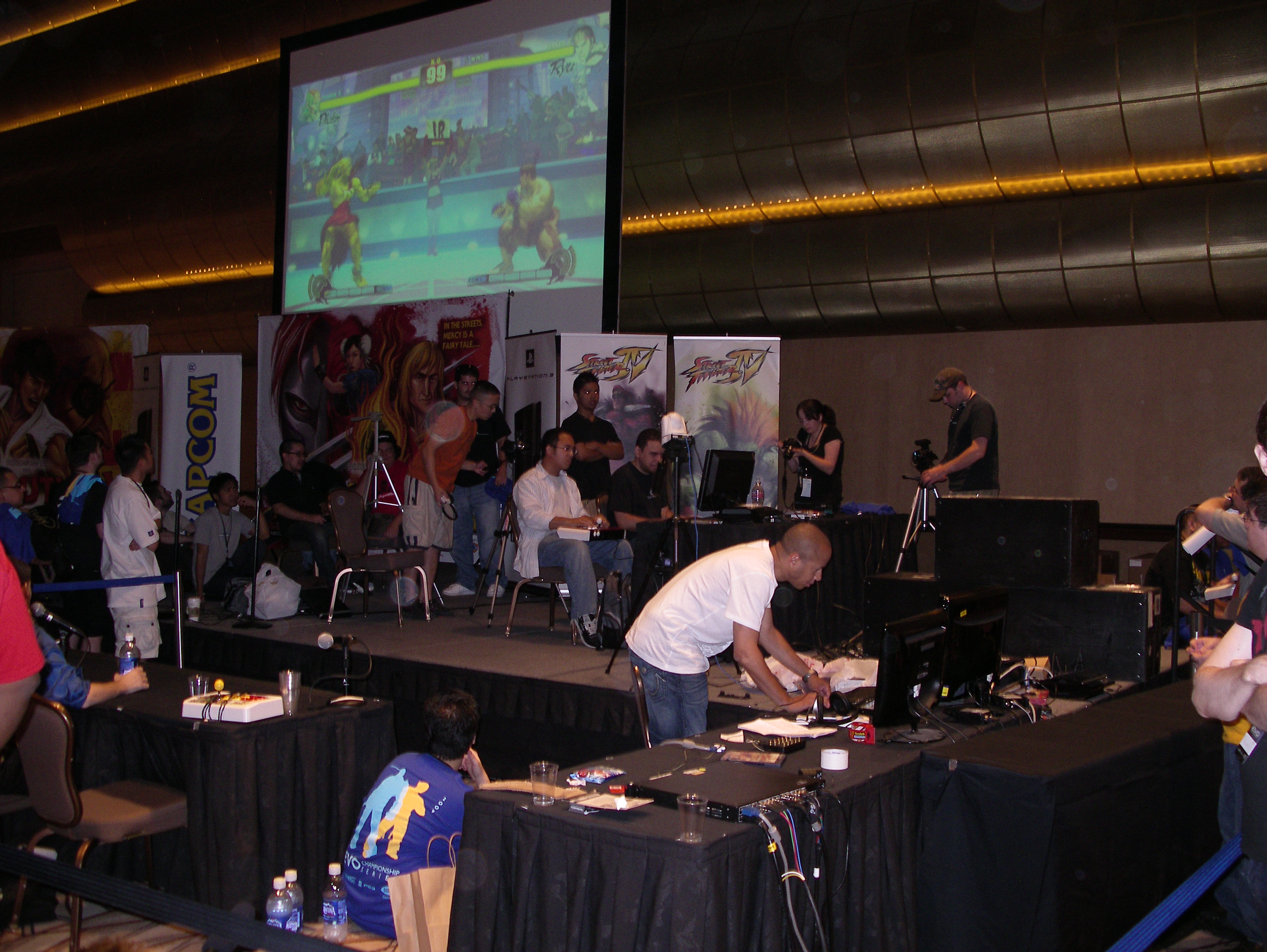
Competitors playing Street Fighter IV on day 1 of the event.

The Evo 2009 Street Fighter IV finals were defined by Justin Wong and Daigo Umehara. Wong had lost to Umehara two times before; once at the GameStop tournament in San Francisco earlier that year, and before that during their renowned match at Evo 2004. Wong lost to Umehara again at Evo 2009, but made his way to the grand finals of the tournament through the losers' bracket to meet Umehara again. Justin Wong was playing with Abel against Daigo Umehara's Ryu, but after losing his first game in the grand finals, Wong switched to the character Balrog; a character he had never been publicly seen playing before. Wong won three consecutive games with Balrog, earning him his first set and a bracket reset.

In the last set of the grand finals, Wong and Umehara both won two matches, and the title hinged on the fifth and final match of the set. Both players were throwing out safe crouching attacks from a distance in order to chip away at the other's vitality with minimal risk. Wong cautiously played more aggressively as the match continued, but Umehara gained and retained the lead by parrying and punishing several of Balrog's "dash punches." In the end, both characters had very little vitality left and Wong decided to jump in for the final blow, a move Umehara countered with a jump-kick to Balrog's chest. Umehara defeated Wong again and took home the $7,000 USD cash prize.

== Results ==
Street Fighter IV
Place	Player	Alias	Character(s)
1st	(Japan) Daigo Umehara	Daigo	Ryu
2nd	(United States) Justin Wong	JWong	Rufus, Balrog, Abel
3rd	(United States) Ed Ma		Akuma, Zangief
4th	(United States) Sanford Kelly	Santhrax	Akuma, Cammy
5th	(United States) Long Tran	ShadyK	Akuma
5th	(Puerto Rico) Eduardo Pérez-Frangie	vVv Scrub	Balrog, E. Honda
7th	(Japan) Takashi Hukushi	Dan	Ryu
7th	(United States) Ricki Ortiz	HelloKitty	Rufus

Super Street Fighter II Turbo HD Remix
Place	Player	Alias	Character(s)
1st	(United States) Hung Nguyen	Afro Legends	Balrog, Dee Jay
2nd	(United States) John Choi	Choiboy	Ryu
3rd	(United States) Damien Dailidenas	Damdai	Ken, Zangief
4th	(United States) Graham Wolfe	GWolfe	Balrog
5th	(Canada) Louis Paquin	Thelo	E. Honda
5th	(United States) David Sirlin	Sirlin	Fei Long, Cammy, M. Bison
7th	(United States) Alex Valle	CaliPower	Ryu
7th	(United States) Alex Salguero	SiN	Guile, Dhalsim

Marvel vs. Capcom 2: New Age of Heroes
Place	Player	Alias	Character(s)
1st	(United States) Sanford Kelly	Santhrax	Storm, Sentinel, Captain Commando
2nd	(United States) Justin Wong	JWong	Storm, Sentinel, Cyclops
3rd	(United States) Michael Mendoza	IFC Yipes	Magneto, Storm, Psylocke
4th	(United States) Bill Wellman	Deus	
5th	(United States) Marc Ansay	MadBooFace	Magneto, Sentinel, Captain Commando
5th	(United States) Sooyoung Chon	SooMighty	Magneto, Storm, Psylocke
7th	(United States) Jay Son	Ytwojay	Magneto, Storm, Psylocke
7th	(United States) Erik Arroyo	SmoothViper	

Guilty Gear XX Accent Core Plus
Place	Player	Alias	Character(s)
1st	(Saudi Arabia) Abdullatif Alhmili	Latif	Eddie
2nd	(United States) Martin Phan	Marn	Eddie, Jam
3rd	(United States) Peter Susini	FlashMetroid	May
4th	(United States) David Lardiere	Hellmonkey	Baiken
5th	(United States) Mike Boczar	Elvenshadow	Faust
5th	(United States) Alex Tsakanikaas	Senkei	Faust
7th	(Japan) Dong Yim	Wuku	Testament
7th	(France) Philippe Tanovan	Joe Higashi	Chipp

Street Fighter III: 3rd Strike 2 vs. 2 Teams
Place	Player	Alias	Character(s)	State
1st	(United States) Justin Wong (Japan) Issei Suzuki	jwong Issei	Chun-Li; Yun	New York; Japan
2nd	(United States) Jimmy Tran (United States) Rommel Macatangay	Emphy; Rom	Urien; Yang	California
3rd	(United States) Mark Rogoyski (United States) Ryan Harvey	Mopreme; Fubarduck	Ryu; Chun-Li	Texas
4th	(United States) Alex Valle (United States) J.R. Rodriguez	CaliPower; J.R.	Ken; Akuma	California
5th	(United States) Lee Cephas (United States) Jaime Morin	Cephas; Starboy	Dudley; Ken	Texas
5th	(United States) Amir (United States) Thomas	Amir; The Pad Player	Chun-Li; Ibuki	California
7th	(United States) Hsien Chang (United States) Ricki Ortiz	hsien HelloKitty	Yun; Chun Li	Texas; California
7th	(United States) Mike Zaimont (United States) Alex Sanchez	Mike Z Sanchez	Makoto; Alex	California

Soulcalibur IV
Place	Player	Alias	Character(s)
1st	(France) Jonathan Ledy	Malek	Ivy
2nd	(United States) Phillip Atkinson	KDZaster	Cassandra, Astaroth
3rd	(United States) Joseph Freire	Thugish_pond	Amy, Hilde
4th	(United States)	Ceirnian	Hilde
5th	(Dominican Republic) Norman Sainz	Omega	Zasalamel, Nightmare
5th	(United States) Robert Combs	RTD	Hilde
7th	(United States)	AlphaMale	Voldo
7th	(United States) Delnar Diaz	Dreamkiller	Amy

== Legacy ==
Though the Evolution Championship Series had been growing steadily for years, Evo 2009 saw the most significant surge in attendees of its era. Organizers Joey Cuellar and Tom Cannon remembered there being a strong divide between the existing playerbase and the newcomers, especially online. Older players coined the term "09er" to describe the people who started playing after the release of Super Street Fighter IV. Cannon said the divide diminished at live events such as Evolution. Competitor Peter Rosas remembered the novelty of spectators attending Evo 2009, as previous tournaments were exclusively attended by fellow competitors. 2009 is seen as the end of a "dark age" in the fighting game community.

Evo 2009 was the first Evolution event where match footage was made easily available on the internet. Cuellar stated that while they had set up a bootleg livestream at Evo 2005, the organization went all out at Evo 2009 with commentators. This live showcase of the competitions resulted in much more growth than presenting matches on DVD had.
