= Alex Valle =

Peruvian-American professional esports player

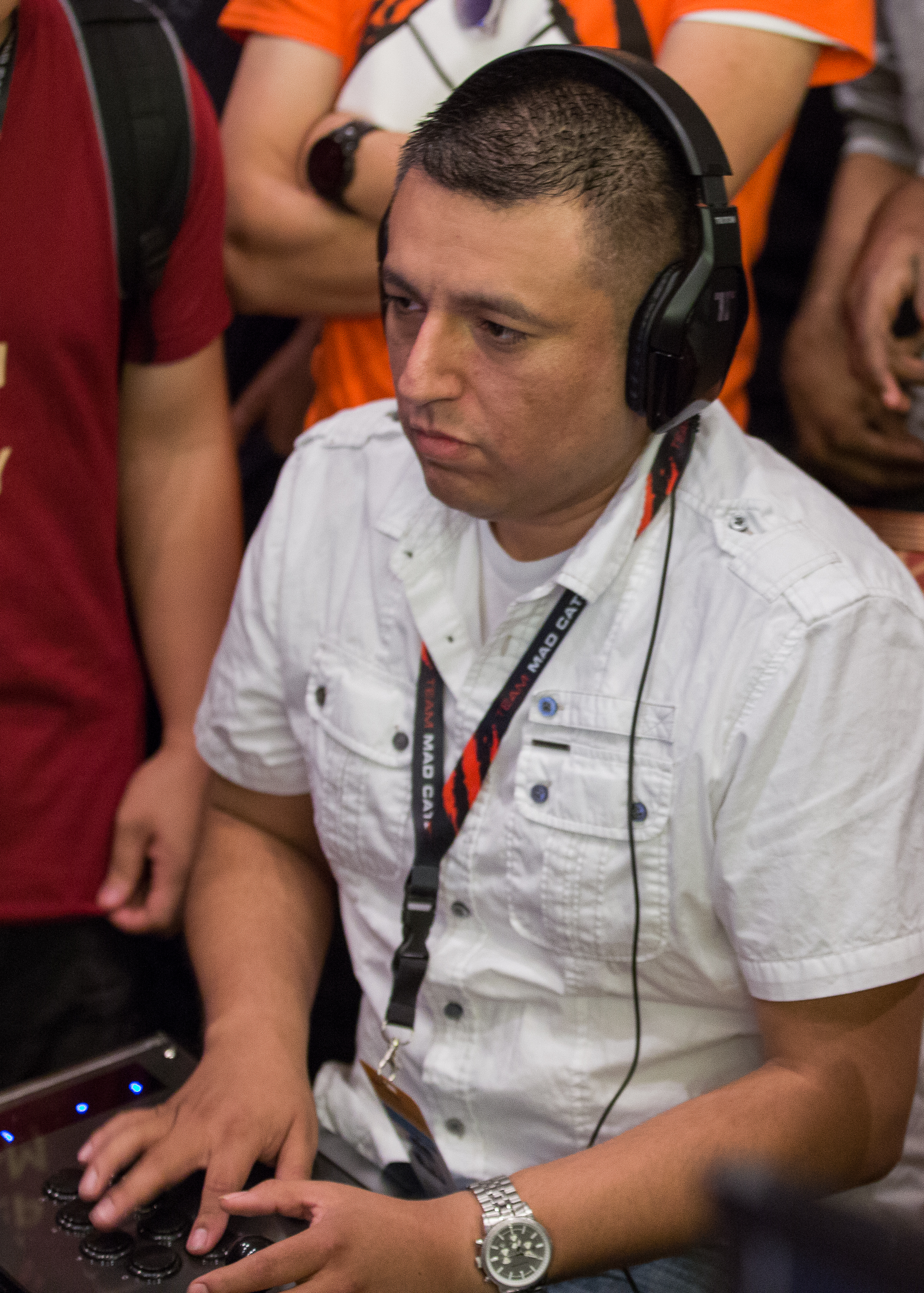
- Valle at EVO 2012
- Born: 1977 or 1978 (age 48–49); Lima, Peru
- Other names: LU Alex Valle; CaliPower; Mr. Street Fighter
- Title: Co-founder of Level Up

Esports career information
- Games: Street Fighter series; Virtua Fighter 3; Tekken series; Marvel vs. Capcom series; Capcom vs. SNK 2; Mortal Kombat 9; Persona 4 Arena; Killer Instinct
- Playing career: 1998–2017

Alex Valle (Spanish pronunciation: [ˈbaʎe]), also known as CaliPower and Mr. Street Fighter, is a Peruvian-American fighting game tournament organizer and a retired professional fighting game player. Valle is mainly a Ryu specialist and is considered one of the most influential people within the fighting game community.

== Gaming career ==
The first tournament Valle entered was an original Street Fighter II tourney using Ken, in which he lost to a Guile and a Dhalsim player. Valle's original competition was John "Choiboy" Choi and Mike "Watts" Watson. He was also the first American to ever face Daigo Umehara in a tournament: the Street Fighter Alpha 3 World Championships in 1998. In the tournament, Valle lost to Umehara in an outstanding comeback. From 2002 to 2010, Valle has had 10 Top 8 performances Valle is known for innovating the "Valle CC (Custom Combo)" which was his key to winning the Battle By the Bay Street Fighter Alpha 2 tournament, the predecessor of the Evolution Championship Series (EVO).

After three years of not making a Top 8 at EVO, Valle took a 4th-place finish at EVO 2013 for Street Fighter X Tekken using a team of Yoshimitsu and Lars, being defeated by Justin Wong. Valle later took a 4th-place finish at Capcom Cup 2013, losing an "epic" runback against Dexter "Tampa Bison" James. According to an interview with Canadian Smasher Toronto Joe, Valle was impressed with the Super Smash Bros. Melee scene in SoCal. When Toronto Joe asked for advice for building a community, Valle responded "Find a group of dedicated people willing to lend a hand and create frequent events. Community building takes a long time so have realistic expectations and cater to your scene directly." When Toronto Joe asked how the Fighting Game Community stands out compared to other game genres, such as first-person shooters and MOBAs, Valle stated that "[t]he FGC started in arcades where you had to take out the player next to you. The social interaction is what makes every match interesting because we instantly feel our opponents struggle for each defeat." Valle was excited for Super Smash Bros. 4 and he felt interested in showcasing the game at upcoming tournaments.

Valle competed in an early preview of Ultra Street Fighter IV's Omega Mode, in which he lost against Ryan "Filipino Champ" Ramirez. Valle is known for having an offensive playstyle when playing with Ryu, as determined by Justin Wong in his Step Up Your Game series of articles. Valle announced his retirement from competitive gaming in April 2017.

== Personal life ==
Valle is a co-founder of Level Up and is the man behind the SoCal Regionals tournaments as well as the Wednesday Night Fights Online Tournaments. Valle formerly ran ReveLAtions, The Runback, and Super Smash Sundays; the former being a major that happens once a year, and the latter two being weeklies. He was born in Lima, Peru.

Valle is a cousin of Roy "Trail" Valle who was formerly on SSBMRank 2013 and 2014, ranked 89th and 88th respectively.

== Tournament results ==
Tournament Results

Year	Tournament	Placement	Game
1996	SHGL SFA2 Tournament	1st	Street Fighter Alpha 2
1996	SHGL Super Final SFA2 Tournament	1st	Street Fighter Alpha 2
1997	UCLA Street Fighter III Tournament	1st	Street Fighter III
1997	SHGL SFIII Tournament	2nd	Street Fighter III
1997	SF III Midwest Extravaganza	2nd	Street Fighter III
1998	SHGL SFA3 Tournament	1st	Street Fighter Alpha 3
1998	SFA3 International Championship	2nd	Street Fighter Alpha 3
1998	SFA3 National Championship	1st	Street Fighter Alpha 3
1998	Sacramento SFA3 Tournament	5th	Street Fighter Alpha 3
1998	US Fighting Game Championships	1st	Tekken 3
1998	US Fighting Game Championships	1st	Virtua Fighter 3
1998	US Fighting Game Championships	1st	Street Fighter III: 2nd Impact
1998	US Fighting Game Championships	1st	Street Fighter Alpha 2
1998	Las Vegas 2nd Impact Tournament	1st	Street Fighter III: 2nd Impact
1999	East Coast Championships 4	1st	Street Fighter III: 2nd Impact
1999	East Coast Championships 4	3rd	Marvel vs. Capcom 2
1999	East Coast Championships 4	1st	Street Fighter Alpha 3
1996	B3 – Battle by the Bay	4th	Super Street Fighter II Turbo
1996	B3 – Battle by the Bay	1st	Street Fighter Alpha 2
1999	SHGL SFA3 Tournament	1st	Street Fighter Alpha 3
1999	NorCal SF/Tekken Tournament	1st	Tekken Tag Tournament
1999	NorCal SF/Tekken Tournament	2nd	Street Fighter III: 3rd Strike
1999	NorCal SF/Tekken Tournament	1st	Marvel vs. Capcom
1999	NorCal SF/Tekken Tournament	1st	Street Fighter Alpha 3
2000	East Coast Championships 5	5th	Marvel vs. Capcom 2
2000	East Coast Championships 5	1st	Tekken Tag Tournament
2000	East Coast Championships 5	2nd	Street Fighter Alpha 2
2000	East Coast Championships 5	1st	Street Fighter III: 3rd Strike
2000	East Coast Championships 5	2nd	Street Fighter Alpha 3
2000	Midwest Championships	2nd	Street Fighter III: 3rd Strike
2000	Midwest Championships	1st	Street Fighter Alpha 2
2000	Midwest Championships	2nd	Super Street Fighter II Turbo
2000	B4 Street Fighter Championships	2nd	Marvel vs. Capcom 2
2000	B4 Street Fighter Championships	1st	Street Fighter III: 3rd Strike
2000	B4 Street Fighter Championships	1st	Street Fighter Alpha 2
2000	B4 Street Fighter Championships	2nd	Super Street Fighter II Turbo
2000	B4 Street Fighter Championships	2nd	Street Fighter Alpha 3
2001	B5 Championships	5th	Marvel vs. Capcom 2
2001	B5 Championships	5th	Street Fighter Alpha 3
2001	B5 Championships	3rd	Super Street Fighter II Turbo
2002	Evolution 2002	7th	Capcom vs. SNK 2
2003	NorCal Regionals	2nd	Super Street Fighter II Turbo
2003	NorCal Regionals	5th	Street Fighter III: 3rd Strike
2003	EVO 2003	5th	Super Street Fighter II Turbo
2004	Midwest Championships	1st	Super Street Fighter II Turbo
2004	EVO 2004	5th	Super Street Fighter II Turbo
2006	Texas Showdown 6	5th	Tekken 5
2006	Texas Showdown 6	2nd	Street Fighter Alpha 3
2006	Texas Showdown 6	1st	Street Fighter III: 3rd Strike
2006	Texas Showdown 6	4th	Capcom vs. SNK 2
2006	Texas Showdown 6	3rd	Super Street Fighter II Turbo
2006	EVO 2006	4th	Hyper Street Fighter II
2007	EVO 2007	3rd	Street Fighter III: 3rd Strike
2007	EVO 2007	7th	Super Street Fighter II Turbo
2008	EVO 2008	3rd	Super Street Fighter II Turbo
2009	NorCal Regionals	2nd	Super Street Fighter II Turbo HD Remix
2009	NorCal Regionals	2nd	Street Fighter IV
2009	EVO 2009	7th	Super Street Fighter II Turbo HD Remix
2009	West Coast Warzone	2nd	Street Fighter IV
2010	West Coast Warzone 2	3rd	Super Street Fighter II Turbo HD Remix
2010	West Coast Warzone 2	3rd	Street Fighter IV
2010	Midwest Championships	2nd	Super Street Fighter II Turbo HD Remix
2010	Midwest Championships	1st	Super Street Fighter IV
2010	Devastation 2010	2nd	Super Street Fighter IV
2010	NorCal Regionals	3rd	Super Street Fighter II Turbo HD Remix
2010	NorCal Regionals	4th	Super Street Fighter IV
2010	EVO 2010	7th	Super Street Fighter II Turbo HD Remix
2010	SoCal Regionals	2nd	Super Street Fighter II Turbo HD Remix
2010	SoCal Regionals	2nd	Super Street Fighter IV
2010	EVO SFIV Online Tournament	4th	Super Street Fighter IV
2011	West Coast Warzone 3	3rd	Super Street Fighter II Turbo HD Remix
2011	UFGT 7	5th	Mortal Kombat 9
2011	UFGT 7	2nd	Super Street Fighter II Turbo
2011	UFGT 7	2nd	Super Street Fighter IV
2011	Revelations 2011	4th	Super Street Fighter II Turbo
2011	NorCal Regionals	2nd	Super Street Fighter II Turbo
2011	NorCal Regionals	3rd	Mortal Kombat 9
2011	Sin City Heat	2nd	Super Street Fighter IV: Arcade Edition
2011	DEVASTATION 2011	1st	Super Street Fighter II Turbo HD Remix
2011	SoCal Regionals 2011	2nd	Super Street Fighter II Turbo
2011	SoCal Regionals 2011	7th	Super Street Fighter IV: Arcade Edition
2012	NorCal Regionals 10	5th	Super Street Fighter IV: Arcade Edition v2012
2012	Season's Beatings Ascension	4th	Super Street Fighter IV: Arcade Edition v2012
2012	Canada Cup 2012	3rd	Persona 4 Arena
2012	Youmacon 2012	2nd	Street Fighter X Tekken
2012	Youmacon 2012	3rd	Street Fighter III: 3rd Strike
2012	Youmacon 2012	1st	Super Street Fighter II Turbo HD Remix
2012	Youmacon 2012	7th	Super Street Fighter IV: Arcade Edition v2012
2013	SoCal Regionals 2013	3rd	Street Fighter X Tekken v2013
2013	SoCal Regionals 2013	1st	Super Street Fighter II Turbo
2013	Texas Showdown 2013	2nd	Street Fighter X Tekken v2013
2013	Ultimate Fighting Game Tournament 9	4th	Street Fighter X Tekken v2013
2013	Ultimate Fighting Game Tournament 9	1st	Super Street Fighter IV: Arcade Edition v2012
2013	Evolution 2013	4th	Street Fighter X Tekken v2013
2013	Capcom Cup 2013	4th	Street Fighter X Tekken v2013
2014	Texas Showdown 2014	1st	Street Fighter X Tekken v2013
2014	Texas Showdown 2014	4th	Street Fighter III: 3rd Strike
2014	Texas Showdown 2014	2nd	Street Fighter Alpha 3
2014	Texas Showdown 2014	7th	Super Street Fighter IV: Arcade Edition v2012
2014	Texas Showdown 2014	4th	Super Street Fighter II Turbo
2014	NorCal Regionals 2014	7th	Super Street Fighter IV: Arcade Edition v2012
2014	NorCal Regionals 2014	1st	Super Street Fighter II Turbo
2014	Ultimate Fighting Game Tournament 10	2nd	Killer Instinct
2014	Capcom Pro Tour Invitational @ E3	7th	Ultra Street Fighter IV [2015] Capcom Pro Tour SFV Grand final - Winner )
