= Battle by the Bay =

Video game tournament

Tournament information
- Location: Sunnyvale and Folsom, California, United States
- Tournament format: Round-robin/Double elimination
- Venue(s): Golfland Sunnyvale; GameRoom Folsom

B3: Battle by the Bay, the B4 Championships, and the B5 Championships were the first three instances of the open fighting game event that is now known as the annual Evolution Championship Series. B3 was created by Tom and Tony Cannon, Joey Cuellar, and Seth Killian, and was held in an arcade hall in Sunnyvale, California in 1996. B4 and B5 were held in Folsom, California in 2000 and 2001 respectively, before the tournament was renamed Evolution in 2002. The three tournaments were entirely focused on the Street Fighter and Capcom Versus video game franchises.

Though the Battle by the Bay mainly drew in competitors from the Street Fighter tournament scenes that had coalesced in various cities throughout the United States in the mid-1990s, the tournaments also attracted international challengers early on.

== B3: Battle by the Bay ==
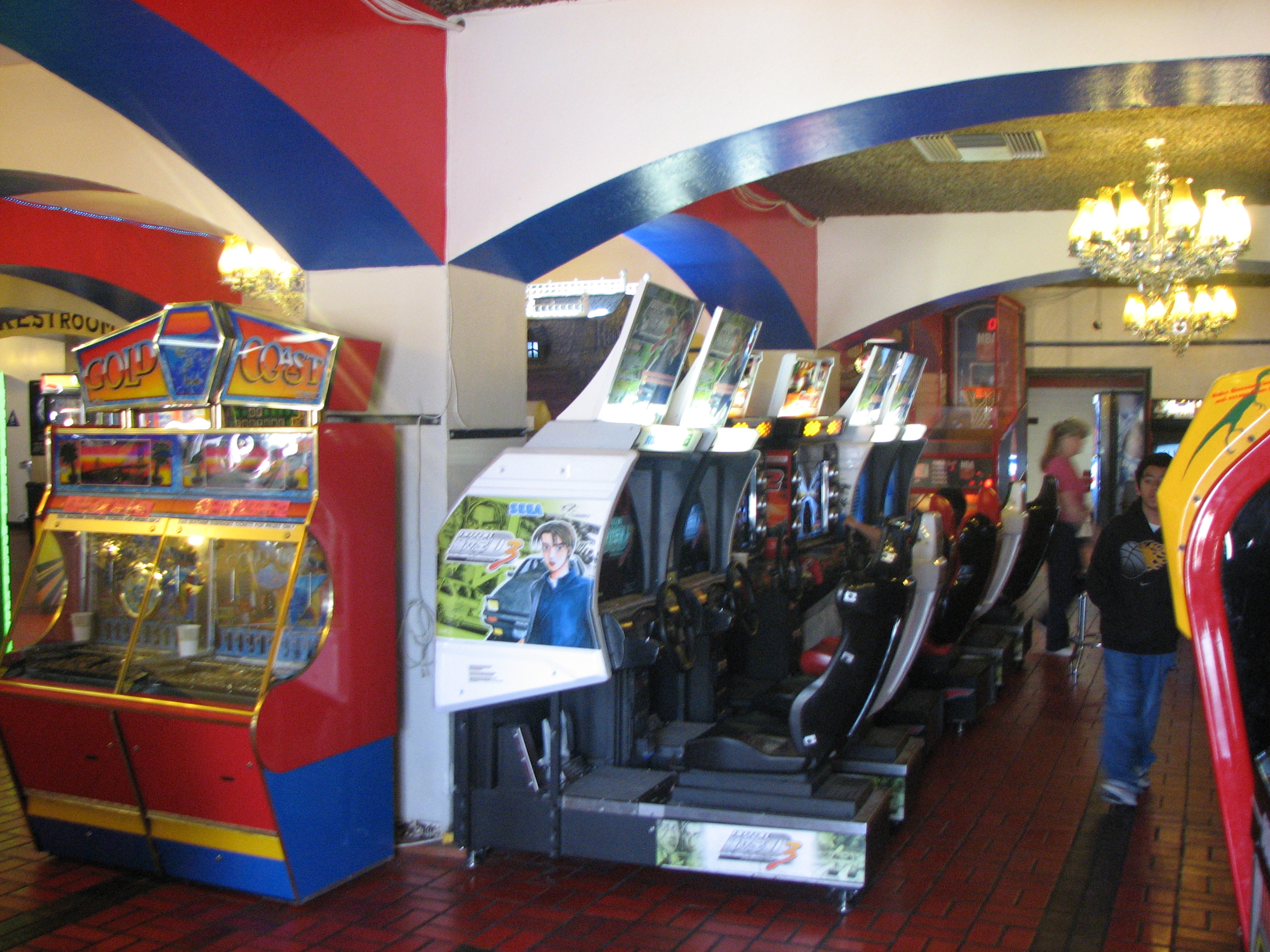
Golfland Sunnyvale arcade hall in 2007

During the mid-1990s, a Street Fighter II tournament scene had coalesced in various cities across the United States. The Golfland arcade hall in Sunnyvale, California was one of the hottest spots for competition in the country, with rivalries happening among various player groups, in particular between Northern and Southern California players. Players were also finding each other and discussing strategies through the internet on message boards. The Battle by the Bay was conceived in order to quell debate over who was the best Street Fighter player in the country.

B3: Battle by the Bay was organized by Tom "inkblot" Cannon, Tony "Ponder" Cannon, Joey "MrWizard" Cuellar, and Seth "S-Kill" Killian It was held in the Golfland arcade hall in Sunnyvale, California in 1996. The tournament had 40 contenders mostly from the United States, though B3 also featured players from Canada and Kuwait. Tom Cannon noted that the international interest in B3 had a big impact on him. Luke Winkie of The Atlantic described B3 as "a snapshot of the brilliant optimism of esports during its earliest days," noting the significant black American presence in the young fighting game community, and therefore the racial diversity at the event.

Alex Valle made his first major appearance at the Battle by the Bay, defeating John Choi in the Street Fighter Alpha 2 grand finals. To win the tournament, Valle revealed an unblockable combo he had discovered, which was dubbed the "Valle CC."

=== Results ===
Super Street Fighter II Turbo
Place	Player	Alias	Character(s)
1st	(United States) Graham Wolfe	GWolfe	
2nd	(United States) Jason Nelson	xrolento	
3rd	(United States) Mike Watson	Watts	
4th	(United States) Alex Valle	CaliPower	
5th	(United States) Alex Wolfe	A_wolfe	
5th	(Kuwait) unknown	Firas	
7th	(United States) Jason Cole	AfroCole	
7th	(Canada) Dave Finnie		

Street Fighter Alpha 2
Place	Player	Alias	Character(s)
1st	(United States) Alex Valle	CaliPower	Ken, Ryu, Sagat
2nd	(United States) John Choi	ChoiBoy	Ken
3rd	(United States) Jason Nelson	xrolento	Charlie, Ken, Sagat
4th	(United States) Jeff Schaefer		Akuma, Ken
5th	(United States) Tony Ngo		Ryu
5th	(United States) Richard Koven		Chun-Li
7th	(United States) Julien Beasley	Zass	Sodom
7th	(United States) Thao Duong		Ken

== B4 Championships ==
The B4 Street Fighter Championships were held on July 15–16, 2000, in Folsom, California. Like B3 four years earlier, B4 featured a Super Street Fighter II Turbo and Street Fighter Alpha 2, but B4 also introduced several new Capcom fighting games to the roster: Street Fighter Alpha 3, Street Fighter III: 3rd Strike, and Marvel vs. Capcom 2: New Age of Heroes. The newly released Marvel vs. Capcom 2 was the first non-Street Fighter game to be included, which served as precedent for the tournament to branch out to other games. The Capcom Versus series has since had a large presence in the Battle of the Bay and Evolution Championship Series events.

The five winners of the Street Fighter Alpha 3 tournament at B4 were flown to Japan to partake in a 5v5 exhibition match between the top-ranking American and Japanese players. The lead up to this exhibition match was the subject of a documentary directed by Peter Kang, titled Bang the Machine.

=== Results ===
Super Street Fighter II Turbo
Place	Player	Alias	Character(s)
1st	(United States) Mike Watson	Watts	Balrog, M. Bison, Ryu
2nd	(United States) Alex Valle	CaliPower	Ryu, O. Sagat
3rd	(United States) John Choi	ChoiBoy	Ryu, O. Sagat
4th	(United States) Jason de Heras	Shirts	O. Dhalsim
5th	(United States) Jason Cole	AfroCole	O. Sagat, Dhalsim
5th	(United States) Jason Nelson	xrolento	Balrog, M. Bison

Street Fighter Alpha 2
Place	Player	Alias	Character(s)
1st	(United States) Alex Valle	CaliPower	
2nd	(United States) John Choi	ChoiBoy	
3rd	(United States) Thao Duong		
4th	(United States) Jason Wilson	DreamTR	

Street Fighter Alpha 3
Place	Player	Alias	Character(s)
1st	(United States) John Choi	ChoiBoy	V-Sakura
2nd	(United States) Alex Valle	CaliPower	V-Akuma, V-Sakura, X-Rolento
3rd	(United States) Thao Duong		A-Charlie, X-Dhalsim
4th	(United States) Eddie Lee		V-Karin, V-Sodom, V-Vega
5th	(United States) Mike Watson	Watts	V-Akuma
5th	(United States) Jason Cole	AfroCole	A-Balrog, V-Dhalsim

Street Fighter III: 3rd Strike
Place	Player	Alias	Character(s)
1st	(United States) Alex Valle	CaliPower	Chun-Li, Ryu
2nd	(United States) Hsien Chang	hsien	Akuma, Yang
3rd	(United States) John Choi	ChoiBoy	Ryu
4th	(United States) Eddie Lee		Chun-Li, Ibuki
5th	(United States) Mike Watson	Watts	Chun-Li
5th	(United States) Martin Vega		Urien, Sean
7th	(United States) Mike Devonish	Mike D	Ibuki
7th	(United States) Jason Wilson	DreamTR	Elena

Marvel vs. Capcom 2
Place	Player	Alias	Character(s)
1st	(United States) Duc Do	Ducvader	
2nd	(United States) Alex Valle	CaliPower	
3rd	(United States) J.R. Gutierrez	Image	
4th	(United States) Arturo Sanchez	Sabin	
5th	(United States) Eddie Lee		

== B5 Championships ==
Held in August 2001 in Folsom, California, the B5 Championships was attended by a much larger international crowd, particularly from Japan. Capcom vs. SNK: Millennium Fight 2000 made its introduction in the tournament roster at B5, and Marvel vs. Capcom 2 was again a headliner of the event, being described by TechTV as "the hottest arcade fighting game of the season." Justin Wong was only 15 years old when he traveled to B5 and won its Marvel vs. Capcom 2 tournament. Tom Cannon later remembered 2001 as a difficult year for the fighting game community: while the tournament scene was growing in size, many arcades throughout the country were closing down. The tournament was rebranded as "Evolution" the next year, with a mission of preserving the arcade tournament scene. Joey Cuellar noted that naming further tournaments "B6" and "B7" would have seemed too confusing.

=== Results ===
Marvel vs. Capcom 2
Place	Player	Alias	Character(s)
1st	(United States) Justin Wong	Jwong	Storm, Sentinel, Cammy
2nd	(United States) Duc Do	Ducvader	Spiral, Cable, Cyclops
3rd	(United States) Jay Snyder	Viscant	Doctor Doom, Storm, Sentinel
4th	(United States) Mike Devonish	Mike D	Storm, Cable, Cammy
5th	(United States) unknown	Golden Nismor	Spiral, Cable, Sentinel
5th	(United States) Alex Valle	CaliPower	Magneto, Storm, Psylocke
7th	(United States) Rattana Phanthourath	Rattana	
7th	(United States) Peter Rosas	Combofiend	Magneto, Cable, Cyclops

Super Street Fighter II Turbo
Place	Player	Alias	Character(s)
1st	(United States) Jason Cole	AfroCole	Dhalsim
2nd	(United States) John Choi	ChoiBoy	O. Sagat, Ryu
3rd	(United States) Alex Valle	CaliPower	Ryu
4th	(United States) Mike Watson	Watts	Ryu, Balrog, Vega
5th	(United States) Jason Nelson	xrolento	M. Bison, Dhalsim
5th	(United States) Jason Gonzales	Apoc	Vega, Balrog
7th	(United States) Bob Painter	kuroppi	E. Honda
7th	(United States) Graham Wolfe	GWolfe	Balrog, Vega

Street Fighter Alpha 3
Place	Player	Alias	Character(s)
1st	(Japan) Ryo Yoshida	BAS	V-Akuma, V-Cody
2nd	(Japan) Tomo Taguchi	Chikyuu	V-Rolento, V-Sodom, V-R. Mika
3rd	(United States) John Choi	ChoiBoy	V-Sakura
4th	(United States) Mike Watson	Watts	V-Akuma
5th	(United States) Alex Valle	CaliPower	V-Akuma
5th	(Japan) unknown	White	V-Sakura
7th	(Japan) Kuni Funada	Kuni	A-Zangief, V-Sodom
7th	(United States) Ricki Ortiz	Hel-o Kit-e	V-Sakura

Capcom vs. SNK
Place	Player	Alias	Character(s)
1st	(Japan) Tomo Taguchi	Chikyuu	C-King, Sakura, Raiden
2nd	(United States) Jason Nelson	xrolento	(S) EX-Balrog, EX-Guile
3rd	(Canada) Jean-Francois Lussier	JFL	
4th	(United States) Ricki Ortiz	Hel-o Kit-e	
