= Randy Lew =

American poker and competitive fighting game player (born 1985)

- Nickname: nanonoko
- Born: July 3, 1985 (age 41)

World Series of Poker
- Bracelet: None
- Money finishes: 15

World Poker Tour
- Title: None

European Poker Tour
- Title: None
- Final table: None
- Money finish: 1

Esports career information
- Games: Fighting games; Hearthstone

Randy Lew (born July 3, 1985), also known as nanonoko, is an American professional poker and competitive fighting game player who has earned over $2,600,000 playing poker on PokerStars. He is known for his ability to play 24 tables at the same time amassing over 4 million hands playing under the alias nanonoko.

== Early life and education ==
Lew grew up in Sacramento, California. In middle school through college Lew played fighting games such as Marvel vs. Capcom, Street Fighter, and Tekken competitively. He finished 5th in the Marvel vs. Capcom 2 event at Evolution Championship Series (EVO) in 2003 and 2004. He attended the University of California, Davis and has a bachelor's degree in managerial economics.

== Career ==
Lew transitioned to poker in college. He was not successful at first making multiple deposits. Slowly he learned what worked and what did not. He added more tables as times progressed and was playing up to 24 tables at the same time earning him SuperNova Elite four times.

Lew has been described as a hardworking grinder who rarely plays above $5/$10. Unlike most players who move up after beating certain stakes, Lew chose to add more tables. He has amassed over $2,600,000 playing low to mid-stakes. On May 4, 2012, while playing in Vancouver, Canada Lew set a Guinness World Record for the 'Most hands of online poker played in 8 hours' playing 14,548 hands and ending with a profit of $20.72.

It was falsely reported that he set this record at the 2012 PCA.

As of 2018, his total live tournament winnings exceed $1,400,000.

== Hearthstone ==
Lew signed to Team Liquid as a professional player for the free-to-play online collectible card Hearthstone in November 2016. He made his debut at DreamHack Winter 2016.

== Personal life ==
In March 2018, Randy Lew announced his engagement to the Chinese professional poker player and PokerStars Team Member Celina Lin. They travel around together for poker competitions, and have been seen at the 2018 EPT in Monaco.
