= John Choi =

John Choi may refer to:

- John Choi (attorney), Minnesota politician
- John Choi (gamer), Street Fighter player
