= Justin Wong =

American-born Canadian professional esports player (born 1985)

Jwong
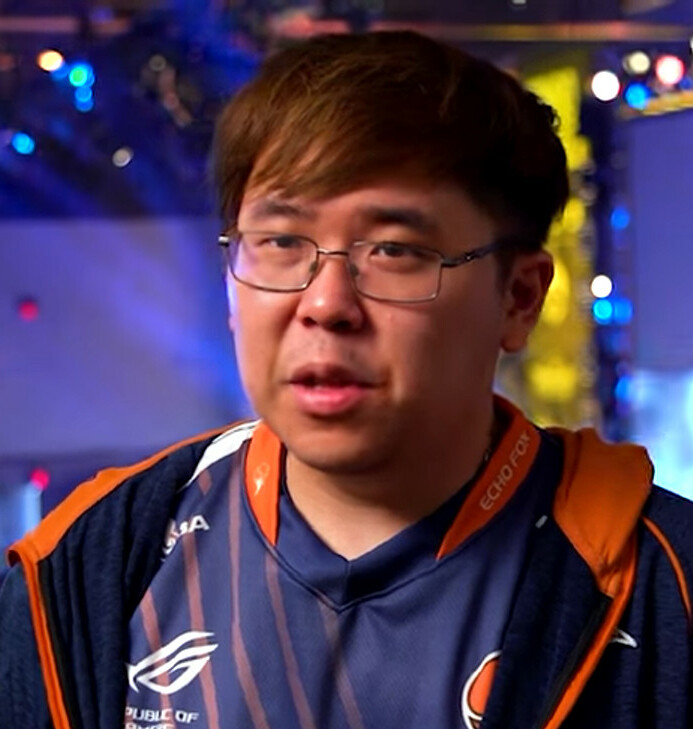
- Wong in 2018

Personal information
- Name: Justin Wong
- Born: November 15, 1985 (age 41)
- Nationality: American

Career information
- Games: Street Fighter series Marvel vs. Capcom series
- Playing career: 2003–2004; 2008–2019; 2021–present

Career highlights and awards
- 9× EVO champion (2001–2004, 2006, 2008, 2009, 2010, 2014); Tougeki champion (2012)

Justin Wong (born November 15, 1985), occasionally shortened to Jwong, is an American professional fighting game player residing in Canada.

Wong has won more EVO titles than anyone else with nine tournaments won: seven for Marvel vs. Capcom 2: New Age of Heroes between 2001 and 2010, one for Street Fighter III: 3rd Strike in 2009, and one for Ultimate Marvel vs. Capcom 3 in 2014.

== Career ==
Justin Wong was only 15 years old when he traveled to B5 in 2001 and won its Marvel vs. Capcom 2 tournament. At the time, Wong did not think much of his fighting game career, later saying "I just wanted to play and play. The prizes were very small, and it was just myself breaking even." He traveled to the Evolution Championship Series in 2002 to successfully defend his Marvel vs. Capcom 2 title and came in ninth at Capcom vs SNK 2.

=== Evolution 2004 ===
In the Evolution 2004 Street Fighter III: 3rd Strike losers bracket final, Wong's Chun-Li lost to Daigo Umehara's Ken Masters when, in an unexpected comeback, Daigo managed to parry all 15 hits of Chun-Li's super art II – a feat noteworthy for its difficulty as each parry must be performed within a window of roughly 1/6th of a second before the attack connects – and land a max damage combo. This incident has been widely shared in a well-known viral video known as "Evo Moment #37".

=== 2009 ===
Wong took part in GameStop's Street Fighter IV US National Tournament in 2009, which he won. After the main tournament, a set of special exhibition matches of Street Fighter IV took place in San Francisco, California, on April 18 after the actual competition ended. It featured Iyo who had recently won the Japanese National SFIV tournament, Poongko who won the Korean SFIV National Tournament, and Daigo Umehara who came by Capcom's invitation, and Wong himself. Wong defeated Iyo and Poongko, but lost to Umehara who went on to win the tournament. He was awarded a tournament seed at Evolution 2009 in Las Vegas.

Wong gained more fame after the footage of his matches in GameStop's competition were spread on the internet. As of July 19, 2009, the video of the match against Umehara received almost 80,000 hits on Niconico video sharing site.

==== Evolution 2009 ====
For winning the US GameStop tournament, Wong started his Street Fighter IV competition as a seeded player in the semi-finals on July 18, the second day of Evo 2009. He beat four opponents and had to start the next day by playing against Daigo Umehara. In the third and the last day, Umehara defeated Wong and put him into the Losers Bracket, then advanced to the grand finals just to meet Wong again. In the final showdown, Wong changed his character from Abel to Balrog (boxer, called M. Bison in Japan) to counter Umehara's signature Ryu. The two fought until the last game possible, but Wong lost the competition. It was this point of the tournament that had more than 23,000 users viewing the stream broadcasting.

==== Seasons Beatings IV ====
Wong joined a tournament called Seasons Beatings on October 16–18 in Columbus, Ohio. He participated in the Street Fighter IV 3 on 3 on the second day with two teammates and won 1st place. There was an exhibition match between him and Daigo Umehara which he lost by two games to ten. For Street Fighter IV Singles, Justin, who this time chose to play Fei Long, won in the Winners Bracket's final against Umehara. He later lost to Umehara after Umehara bounced back from the Loser's Bracket.

=== 2010 ===
In June 2010, Wong left the competitive gaming group Empire Arcadia and signed with professional gaming organization Evil Geniuses with Martin "Marn" Phan and was later joined by Ricki Ortiz.

==== Evolution 2010 ====
Wong won the Marvel vs. Capcom 2 tournament coming out of the loser's bracket. He also placed just out of the top 8 in Super Street Fighter IV, losing to Bruce "Gamerbee" Hsiang.

Wong also participated in the reality show WCG Ultimate Gamer. He made it as far as the Gauntlet (series of semi-final elimination challenges), but was eliminated during the Forza Motorsport 3 driving challenge.

=== 2011 ===
==== PDP.com's Mortal Kombat Nationals ====
Wong stormed through the tournament without losing a set up until the grand finals where he won the tournament and the $10,000 1st prize using Kung Lao, playing against Floe's Ermac in the finals.

=== 2015 ===
In 2015, it was announced that Wong would be participating in the Red Bull Kumite 2016 Street Fighter V invitational tournament.

=== 2024 ===
Following the release of Marvel vs. Capcom Fighting Collection: Arcade Classics, several players claimed to be quitting and wanting refunds after facing Wong online in Marvel vs. Capcom 2. Wong reacted to Dexerto's article about him.

== Personal life ==
Wong attended Murry Bergtraum High School for Business Careers and was often seen at the Chinatown Fair in Chinatown, Manhattan, where he would be seen playing Marvel vs. Capcom 2 and sometimes Dance Dance Revolution.

Wong's engagement to Jacqueline was announced on July 28, 2018, and they have a daughter.

As of 2022, he lives in Vancouver, British Columbia.
