= John Choi (gamer) =

American esports player

- Citizenship: American
- Occupation: Fighting game player
- Known for: Fighting game community

John Choi, also known as Choiboy, is an American professional fighting game player specializing in the Street Fighter series. Choi joined the fighting game community in the 1990s and was involved with the Evolution Championship Series since its beginning. In 2008, he became the only player to win multiple Evolution tournaments in the same year.

Choi was the lead organizer of the annual NorCal Regionals tournament.

== Early life ==
John Choi's family immigrated from South Korea to San Jose, California when he was 10 years old. Choi's father, Jae Jeon Choi, was a former participant of the Olympic Games in judo and wrestling. John Choi participated in the AAU Junior Olympic Games at a young age, practicing taekwondo, before turning to wrestling in high school. Choi's father dissuaded him from dedicated too much effort in amateur sports or video games, and Choi passed up a wrestling scholarship in favor of focusing on his education. John Choi attended the University of California, Davis.

During his teenage years in the 1990s, Choi spent much of his free time playing Street Fighter II. Before he turned old enough to get his driver's license, he frequently cycled to a nearby 7-Eleven and the local Golfland to train. Once he became able to drive, he settled on the Sunnyvale Golfland location, which he found had the best competition. Choi remembered his first Street Fighter tournament in the mid-1990s at a local Pizza Hut, where the top players won pizzas. In 1996, Choi entered the Street Fighter Alpha 2 tournament at B3: Battle by the Bay, where he ended in second place behind Alex Valle after a close set.

== Career ==
John Choi was a finalist in each of the Battle by the Bay tournaments and supported the organizers in the early years of the Evolution Championship Series, notably coordinating the visits of Japanese players to the United States. Choi was a consistent top-8 finisher at the Evolution Championship Series: he placed second at the Evo 2004 Street Fighter tournament behind Daigo Umehara, and second at Evo 2007 behind Tokido. Choi initially intended to pass on Evo 2008 because his father was having life-saving surgery, but Jae Jeon Choi convinced him to go to the event anyway. Despite a lack of training and challenging opponent pools, Choi won first place at both the Super Street Fighter 2 Turbo and Capcom vs. SNK 2 tournament, making him the only player to win multiple Evolution tournaments in the same year. Choi used the prize money to help pay for his father's physical therapy.

John Choi mentored Ricki Ortiz in the early 2000s. Evo 2009 was the last time John Choi reached the top 8 in Street Fighter, because he never got deeply involved with Street Fighter III and IV. Despite this, he was still able to beat Street Fighter IV champion Umehara at Evo 2014 during pools.

Choi was involved with the planning of the annual NorCal Regionals tournament since its beginning, and was its lead organizer until the series was cancelled due to the 2020 COVID-19 pandemic.
