= Evo 2004 =

Fighting game event

2004 Evolution Championship Series

Tournament information
- Location: Pomona, California, United States
- Dates: July 29–August 1
- Tournament format: Round-robin/Double elimination
- Venue: California State Polytechnic University, Pomona

The 2004 Evolution Championship Series (commonly referred to as Evo 2004 or EVO 2004) was a fighting game event held at the California State Polytechnic University, Pomona in Pomona, California from July 29 to August 1. The event featured nine fighting games on the main lineup, including Street Fighter III: 3rd Strike and Marvel vs. Capcom 2. While in previous Evolution events all competitions were held on arcade machines, most tournaments at Evo 2004 were played on video game consoles with the exception of Street Fighter III.

Evo 2004 featured the first Street Fighter match between Daigo Umehara and Justin Wong, in which Umehara executed the "Daigo Parry". The controversial final match of the Soulcalibur II tournaments held at Evo 2004 motivated the implementation of a collusion rule still in use today.

== Background ==
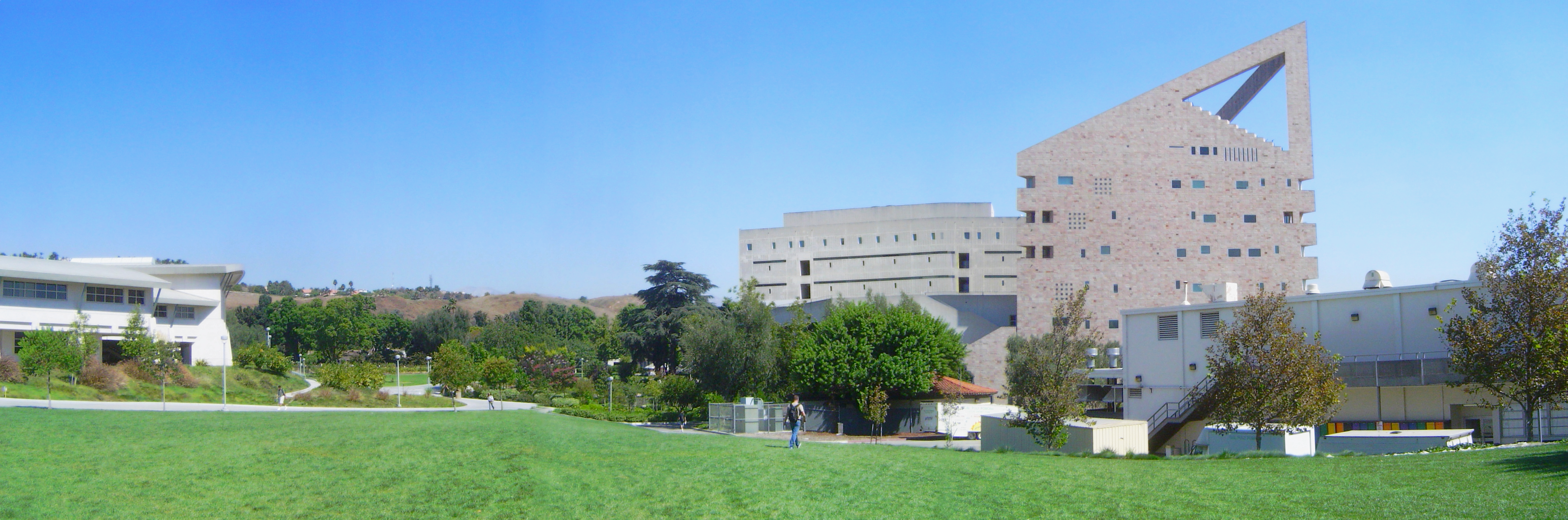
Evo 2004 was held at Cal Poly Pomona.

The sixth Evolution Championship Series was held at the California State Polytechnic University, Pomona, Southern California on July 29 to August 1. Evo 2004 featured approximately 700 participants from over 30 nations, each competing in one or more of the nine tournaments held at the event. In order to create an easier situation for staff and increase the average play time of participants, the double-elimination-style tournaments of previous Evo events was replaced with a round-robin/double-elimination pool system. In the old system, some players would find themselves being eliminated from a tournament after losing two games, but because of the newly implemented system each participant would face off against at least nine other players during the preliminary pool.

2004 was in the middle of what Tom Cannon would later describe as the "Dark Ages" of the fighting game community, when fighting games were largely abandoned by game developers. However, the Evolution Championship Series grew steadily every year, and had become the largest fighting game tournament of its time.

Up until Evo 2004, every Evolution event relied almost entirely on arcade cabinets. However, arcade hardware has always been relatively difficult to get a hold of, especially for games that do not run on Capcom's CP System II system boards. Furthermore, arcade hardware would commonly offer up technical issues. Lastly, competitors often complained that the arcade hardware available at Evolution was different from the hardware they have trained on. In order to solve these issues, the Evolution organizers opted to switch to using video game consoles only at the tournament, where participants have to bring their own game controllers. Only the Street Fighter III: Third Strike tournament held at Evo 2004 was played on arcade hardware, because the Street Fighter Anniversary Collection release date was pushed back to August.

Tournament organizers opted to turn the team tournaments, which were traditionally exhibition matches, into a main part of the event. Two specifically seeded team tournaments in Capcom vs. SNK 2 and Marvel vs. Capcom 2 and a Pair Play tournament for Tekken Tag Tournament were held at Evo 2004. Evo 2004 also featured a "Bring Your Own Console" area, where people were able to set up smaller-scale tournaments of games not on the main roster.

== Evo Moment #37 ==
Despite having never matched off against each other before, the Japanese Daigo Umehara and American Justin Wong were known for having a supposed rivalry with each other due to their differences in gaming philosophies. The two players met each other in the loser's finals of Evo 2004's Street Fighter III: 3rd Strike tournament. Umehara, playing using the character Ken, was down to his last unit of health and any special attack by Wong's Chun-Li could knock Ken out. Wong attempted to hit his opponent with Chun-Li's consecutively hitting "Super Art" move, forcing Umehara to parry 15 attacks in a very short period of time. Umehara did so successfully and went on to counter a final kick from Chun-Li in mid-air before launching a combo move himself and winning the match. The clip of Umehara parrying Wong's multihit attack became hugely influential and has been compared to famous sports moments such as Babe Ruth's called shot and the Miracle on Ice.

The Street Fighter III: 3rd Strike tournament was won by Kenji "KO" Obata, playing as Yun. He beat Umehara in the finals, just as he did a year prior at Evo 2003.

== Soulcalibur II incident ==
The final match of the Soulcalibur II tournament at Evo 2004 was held between the friends Rob "RTD" Combs and Marquette "Mick" Yarbrough. The two were widely accused for collusion and not taking the fight seriously, playing using different characters than usual and playing on a "sub-par level". The two disputed these claims when asked about it on Game Show Network's Games Across America. Though Combs and Yarbrough were not punished directly, Evo went on to implement a "collusion rule", stating that players who purposely manipulate a match or intentionally underperform would forfeit prize and title. Speaking with GiantBomb in 2013, Evo-founder Tom Cannon stated that "they broke the spirit of the tournament. ... We were like 'fine, this happened, let's make sure this is never gonna happen again.'" Evolution's anti-collusion measure was further expanded in 2013 and is still in place.

== Results ==
Marvel vs. Capcom 2: New Age of Heroes
Place	Player	Alias	Character(s)
1st	(United States) Justin Wong	jwong	Storm/Sentinel/Captain Commando
2nd	(United States) David Lee	KingDavid	Magneto/Cable/Sentinel
3rd	(United States) Desmond Pinkney	Xecutioner	Sentinel/Storm/Captain Commando
4th	(United States) Chris Schmidt		Magneto/Storm/Sentinel
5th	(United States) Tong Ho	Genghis	Storm/Sentinel/Captain Commando
5th	(United States) Randy Lew		Sentinel/Cable/Captain Commando
7th	(United States) Sooyoung Chon	SooMighty	Storm/Sentinel/Captain Commando
7th	(United States) Peter Avila	Potter	Storm/Magneto/T. Bonne

Street Fighter III: 3rd Strike
Place	Player	Alias	Character(s)
1st	(Japan) Kenji Obata	KO	Yun
2nd	(Japan) Daigo Umehara	Daigo	Ken
3rd	(United States) Justin Wong	jwong	Chun Li
4th	(Japan) Toru Hashimoto	Raoh	Chun Li
5th	(Japan) Keisuke Imai	KSK	Alex
5th	(Japan) Katsuhisa Ota	Kokujin	Dudley
7th	(United States) Hsien Chang	hsien	Ken
7th	(United States) Mike Watson		Ken

Super Street Fighter II Turbo
Place	Player	Alias	Character(s)
1st	(Japan) Daigo Umehara	Daigo	O. Sagat, Ryu, Balrog
2nd	(United States) John Choi	Choiboy	O. Sagat, Guile
3rd	(Japan) Kuni Funada	Kuni	Zangief
4th	(United States) Justin Wong	Jwong	O. Sagat, Chun-Li
5th	(United States) Alex Valle	CaliPower	Ryu, O. Sagat
5th	(United States) Wes Truelson		Ken, Balrog
7th	(United States) Jesse Howard		Ryu
7th	(United States) Seth Killian	S-Kill	E. Honda

Capcom vs. SNK 2
Place	Player	Alias	Character(s)
1st	(Japan) Yosuke Ito	Kindevu	A-Sakura/Bison/Blanka
2nd	(United States) Ricki Ortiz	HelloKitty	A-Vega/Sakura/Blanka
3rd	(United States) John Choi	choiboy	C-Ken/Sagat/Guile
4th	(Japan)	Dan	C-Ken/Ryu/Sagat
5th	(United States) Justin Wong	Jwong	C-Vega/Chun-Li/Sagat
5th	(United States) Campbell Tran	Buktooth	N-Iori/Morrigan/Hibiki
7th	(United States) Eddie Lee		A-Mai/Eagle/Vega
7th	(Japan) Ryota Fukumoto	RF	A-Sakura/Bison/Blanka

Soulcalibur II
Place	Player	Alias	Character(s)
1st	(United States) Robert Combs	RTD	Xianghua, Ivy, Voldo, Nightmare
2nd	(United States) Marquette Yarbrough	Mick	Cassandra, Sophitia, Voldo
3rd	(Canada) Mystic Senior	SowNemesis	Sophitia, Cervantes
4th	(United States) Christian Gonzalez	Vicious Suicide	Yoshimitsu
5th	(United States) Steven Luong	B:L	Mitsurugi
5th	(United States) Rob Nagaro	XCTU	Talim
7th	(United States) Jonathan Soon	Binkley	Cervantes
7th	(United States) Steven Hanna	Eternal Fighter	Nightmare, Xianghua

Guilty Gear X2
Place	Player	Alias	Character(s)
1st	(Japan) Daigo Umehara	Daigo	Sol
2nd	(Japan) Yosuke Ito	Kindevu	Eddie
3rd	(Japan) Ryota Fukumoto	RF	Faust
4th	(United States) Kevin Turner	Shin Kensou	Chipp, Eddie
5th	(Japan) Soh Miura	Miu	Sol
5th	(United States) Saif Ebrahim	ID	Sol
7th	(United States) Daniel Realyvasquez	Ruin	Eddie
7th	(United States) Peter Shou	Xenotiger	Faust, Axl

Virtua Fighter 4: Evolution
Place	Player	Alias	Character(s)
1st	(Japan) Hiromiki Kumada	Itabashi Zangief	Shun Di
2nd	(United States) Eric Chung	ShouTime	Sarah
3rd	(Japan)	Kurita	Vanessa
4th	(United Kingdom) Ryan Hart	Prodigal Son	Kage, Akira
5th	(Japan) Toru Hashimoto	Raoh	Lau
5th	(United States) Adam Rana	adamYUKI	Jeffrey
7th	(United States) Che Dunkley	Cappo	Pai
7th	(United States) Jimmy Byun	Maddy	Akira

Tekken 4
Place	Player	Alias	Character(s)
1st	(United States) Anthony Tran	Jackie Tran	Jin, Steve
2nd	(United States) Josh Eugene Molinaro	JinKid	Heihachi, Jin
3rd	(United States) Thomas Kymn	TomHilfiger	Nina, Steve
4th	(Greece) Nikos Fourikis	Aenica	Julia
5th	(United Kingdom) Ryan Hart	Prodigal Son	Heihachi
5th	(United States) Jason Greeson	USMC Ogre	Paul
7th	(United States) Chetan Chetty	ChetChetty	Paul
7th	(United States) Robert Warren	Qbert3	Jin

Tekken Tag Tournament
Place	Player	Alias	Character(s)
1st	(United Kingdom) Ryan Hart	Prodigal Son	Jin, Kazuya
2nd	(United States) Shaun Rivera	Unconkable	Armor King, Devil Kazuya, Anna
3rd	(United States) Brad Vitale	Slips	Julia / Eddy
4th	(United States) Nick Shin	Shin	Julia / Michelle
5th	(Italy) Fabrizio Tavassi	Bode	Michelle / Julia
5th	(United States) Thomas Kymn	TomHilfiger	Devil Kazuya / Jin, Bruce / Julia
7th	(United States) Chetan Chetty	ChetChetty	Jin / Devil Kazuya, Armor King / Anna
7th	(United States) Joshua Molinaro	JinKid	Jin / Devil Kazuya
