= Ricki Ortiz =

American esports player

- Occupation: Fighting game player
- Known for: fighting game community

Ricki Ortiz, also known as HelloKittyRicki, is an American professional fighting game player specializing in the Marvel vs. Capcom and Street Fighter series. Ortiz joined the fighting game community in the early 2000s and has since consistently ranked highly in high-profile tournaments.

== Early life ==
In an interview, Ortiz described her childhood as "normal and relaxed." She was raised by an engineer and a metalworker; her grandmother babysat her while her parents worked. Ortiz first came in contact with fighting games when her father brought her to a Golfland Entertainment Center in Milpitas, California. By the time Ortiz reached middle school, she spent time at the local arcade almost every day after school.

== Career ==
Ricki Ortiz left the San Francisco Bay Area for the first time in her life in 2001 in order to compete in a major tournament in Texas, following advice of her friend and mentor John Choi. After graduating high school, Ortiz moved to New York City in order to experience the local arcade scene. Ortiz first competed at the Evolution Championship Series in 2003 and has consistently ranked highly since playing games such as Marvel vs, Capcom 2, Street Fighter III: 3rd Strike, Capcom vs. SNK 2, Street Fighter IV, and Street Fighter V.

In 2010, Ricki Ortiz placed second in the Evolution Super Street Fighter IV tournament. In 2016, Ortiz came in second in the 2016 Capcom Cup, losing only to Du "NuckleDu" Dang in the finale and winning US$60,000 in the process. Prior to this event, Ortiz trained two and a half weeks straight with Ryan "Filipino Champ" Ramirez, though she did note that her practice schedule throughout the rest of the 2016 season was less than ideal. During the 2017 Capcom Pro Tour, Ortiz stopped playing Street Fighter for several months and was not nearly as active as in past years. However, after NuckleDu pulled out of the 2017 Capcom Cup, Capcom offered his auto-qualification to Ortiz as the runner up of the 2016 Cup, which she accepted. Ortiz lost to Tokido in the first round of the tournament.

== Style ==
Ortiz prefers the Marvel vs. Capcom franchise over other fighting game series, and has found herself needing to juggle it and the more popular Street Fighter franchise. In an interview with Yahoo, Ortiz stated that she is not comfortable playing online matches due to the inherent lag. She described playing online as being "like I'm playing blind almost, because you're taking my best attributes away." Ortiz's Street Fighter character of choice had been Chun-Li since she first played the game at nine years old. In an interview with ESPN, Ortiz stated that "[Chun-Li is] the one who makes the game fun for me," and that she had great difficulty switching to a different character when Chun-Li was nerfed in 2017.

== Personal life ==
Assigned male at birth, Ricki Ortiz came out as a gay man in 2003, though she noted later that it "didn't feel right". Ortiz experienced a large amount of abuse from anonymous commenters online. In 2009, Ortiz came out as a transgender woman, noting that RuPaul's Drag Race helped with this. Coming out as transgender sparked a new wave of harassment in livestream chatboxes. By 2012, depression affected Ortiz's fighting game career, though her mental state improved after reconnecting with an old friend and taking advantage of the resources and support groups available to her. In 2014, Ortiz started her gender transition.
