= Fighting game community =

Collective of video gamers who play fighting games

The fighting game community (often abbreviated as FGC) is a collective of competitive gamers who play fighting games. It also refers to the fan community or community of players in general surrounding a particular game. The fighting game community started as local arcade groups in the 1990s and expanded to regional gatherings throughout the 2000s. In the 2010s, competitions grew to international levels predominantly due to the rise of esports, online gaming, and live streaming sites such as Twitch.

== History ==
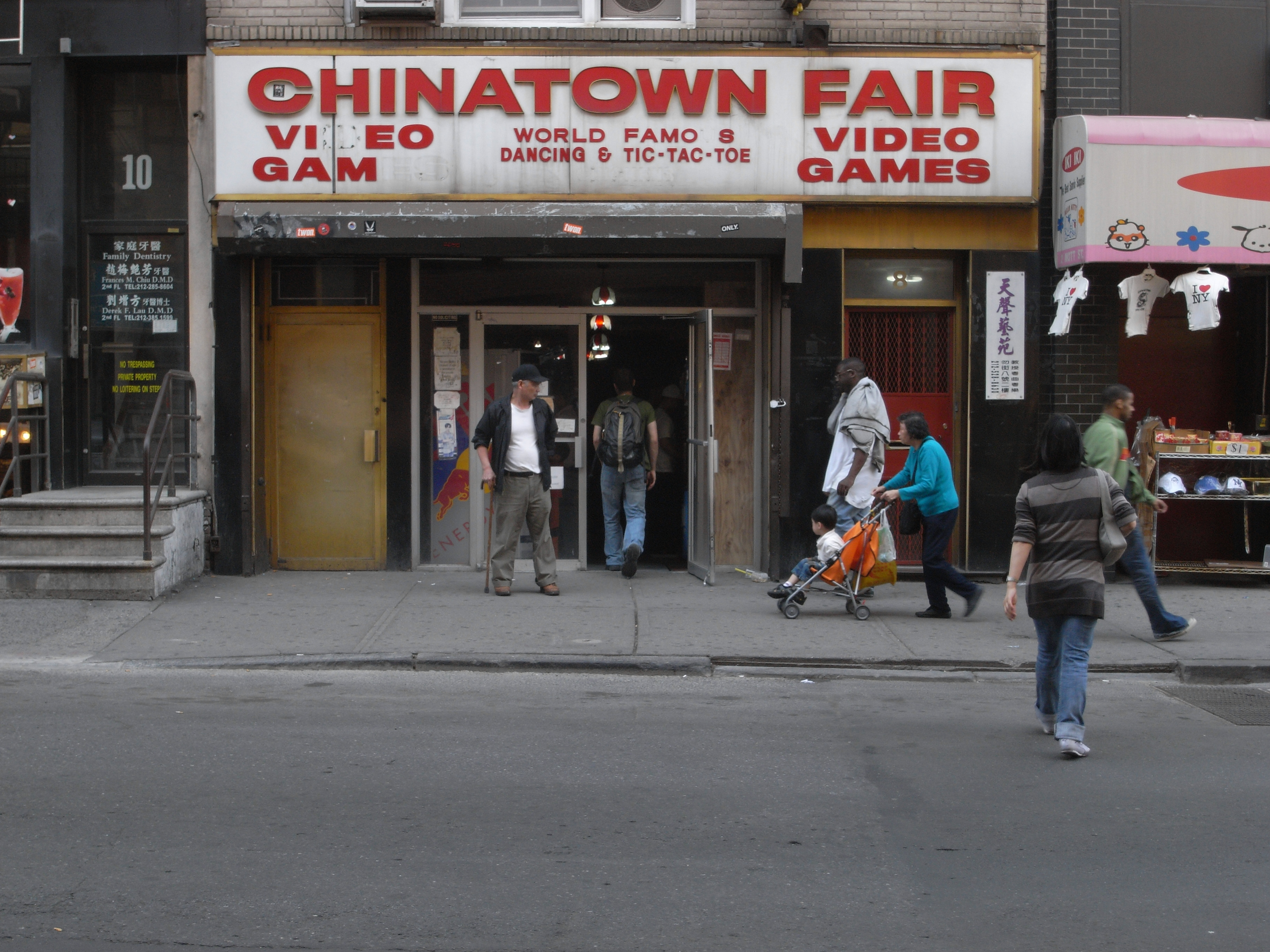
The Chinatown Fair arcade was one of the early venues where a competitive fighting game scene coalesced.

=== Beginnings ===
The game Street Fighter II: The World Warrior was a huge success when it was released in 1991 and is regarded as one of the most influential video games of all time. It refined and popularized the fighting game genre and introduced many now-staples of the genre, such as combos and character selection but most notably, it allowed players to directly compete by fighting against each other in the game, while earlier games primarily had players compete by comparing highscores. During the mid-1990s, a Street Fighter II tournament scene had coalesced in various cities across the United States. Highly competitive communities formed naturally in Chinatown Fair in New York City, Super Just Games in the Chicago area, and the Golfland arcade halls in Sunnyvale and Stanton, California. Players had also began finding each other and discussing strategies on message boards via the internet. In 1996, the first nation-wide fighting game tournament was held in the form of B3: Battle by the Bay. This tournament was conceived in order to quell debate over who was the best Street Fighter player in the country, but also attracted international competitors. In London, England most arcades would have had Street Fighter II, including in the basement of Hamleys and more competitive venues like Casino Leisure Centre. An eight-player Tournament Battle edition of Super Street Fighter II: The New Challengers soon appeared on the scene; however, the first known official tournament occurred in 1994 at Trocadero on the sequel Super Street Fighter II Turbo.

=== 2000–2009: early years ===
In early 2000, a forum was created called Shoryuken.com which was named after the iconic Street Fighter attack. The site became the main go to forum for many fighting game competitors and it quickly attracted the community to create major tournaments to gather the best players from around the country. One of the most major tournaments that gathers players from around the world is called the Evolution Championship Series (Evo). The rise in competitive video game genres during the 2000s became a phenomenon known as "Esports". The early 2000s also saw the rise in online gaming, as in 2004, Mortal Kombat: Deception, Dead or Alive Ultimate, and the Xbox version of Street Fighter Anniversary Collection became the first fighting games to offer online multiplayer, which also contributed in growing the community. In middle of the 2000s Capcom's popularity began to fade due to lack of new fighting games, the overall sales of the genre, and some problems within the community; though it could be noted that the lack of a new street fighter game created a popularity vacuum, in which games like Tekken, Soulcaliber, Dead or Alive, and Virtua Fighter increased in popularity.

It was not until 2007 that a new spark arose in the fighting game community. Dead or Alive 4 was included in the Championship Gaming Series (CGS) in 2007 and 2008, becoming the first fighting game to have a televised competitive esport scene. Dead or Alive 4 was the only fighting game included in the esport league and was operated and fully broadcast by DirecTV in association with British Sky Broadcasting (BSkyB) and STAR TV. Almost 8 years after the release of Street Fighter III: 3rd Strike, Capcom announced the continuation of the mainline Street Fighter series with the development of Street Fighter IV. The game was acclaimed by major game review outlets and is seen as the chief catalyst of the revival of the FGC. By rejuvenating the popularity of fighting games, its release also created an influx of new players into the community, increasing the number of competitors and introducing legendary players such as SonicFox, Momochi, Snake Eyez, and GamerBee, among others.

=== 2010–current ===
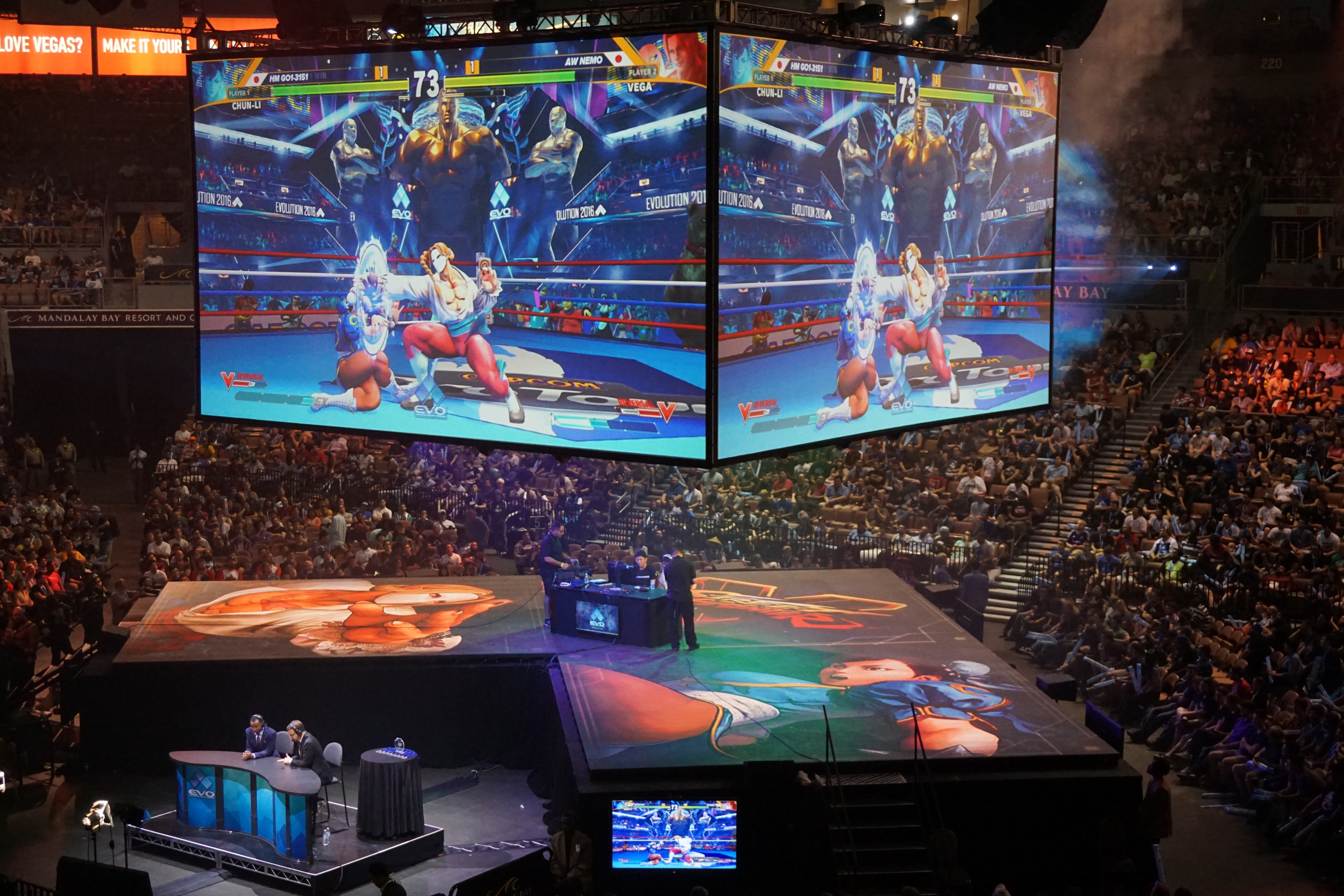
Evo 2016 Street Fighter V finals held at the Mandalay Bay Convention Center in Las Vegas

After the success of Street Fighter IV, new fighting games began being developed and the FGC expanded with more tournaments. The tournaments even started being live-streamed with Twitch so many people can view the tournaments. There are also sponsor-ships from franchises like Evil Geniuses, Broken Tier, and Mad Catz, which pays players for advertisement.

Despite the rise of other competitive video game genres, many members of the FGC have rejected the label of "Esports" on their community.

The overall size of the community remains a small proportion of the fighting game market overall. Some of the genre's best-selling games, such as Tekken 7, Super Smash Bros. Ultimate, and Mortal Kombat 11, have sold in excess of 10 million copies. In contrast, the largest tournaments for fighting games see roughly 3,000-7,000 competitors; however, viewership numbers peak as high as 400,000 during events such as Evo, with unique viewership counts reaching over 3.7 million across all games.

In recent years, the FGC has been rocked by numerous sexual assault and harassment allegations involving legal proceedings, including those of some of the FGC's most prominent organizers like Evo co-founder and organizer, Joey Cuellar, and some of the FGC's most prominent Super Smash Bros. players.

In 2020, the Japan Fighting Game Publishers Roundtable was announced where game development heads for Dead or Alive, Fighting EX Layer, Guilty Gear, Samurai Shodown, Soulcalibur, Street Fighter and Tekken, came together for a livestreamed discussion on the future of fighting games and other topics. The event later followed with more developers, such as the developers for The King of Fighters in 2021, and Virtua Fighter in 2022.

The COVID-19 pandemic resulted in a sudden pause to offline FGC events, with many communities relying on online services to connect. The size of fighting game tournaments hosted by the community have continued to grow following the pandemic. Evo 2023 saw 7,061 attendees for its Street Fighter 6 event, breaking records as one of the largest offline brackets in video game history, while Evo 2024 brought in the most unique competitors of any esports event in history, accumulating 9,221 players across all of its brackets.

== Culture ==
=== Diversity ===
In a 2014 article on the racial diversity of fighting game competitions, mainly the Evo tournament series, Mitch Bowman of Polygon wrote about "[h]ow the FGC's roots grew the most racially diverse community in gaming." The FGC has also been noted as being relatively accepting of LGBTQ competitors compared to other gaming communities, with top-level players such as Dominique "SonicFox" McLean and Sasha "Magi" Sullivan being open about their experiences with gender identity.

=== Iconic moments ===
Several iconic FGC moments have garnered attention from the broader gaming scene and beyond, becoming representative of the communities culture. Evo Moment 37 was a miraculous comeback performed by Daigo "The Beast" Umehara against his opponent Justin Wong, during the Street Fighter III: 3rd Strike bracket at Evo 2004. The moment saw Daigo parry every hit of Chun-Li's super art while only a pixel of his health remained, before depleting the rest of Justin's healthbar with a counterattack. The moment has been described by Rolling Stone as "esports' most thrilling moment," with Kotaku hailing it as the 6th best moment in pro-gaming history in a 2011 article. Justin Wong often replies to posts referencing the moment online, jokingly poking fun at his own misfortune, while often speaking in appreciation of the moment, commenting that "every tournament, every time I stream, I'll have at least one person that comes up to me and says, 'I got into fighting games because of Moment #37.' Obviously, I took the loss but when you hear stuff like that, you just can't be mad about it." Evo Moment 37 is commonly referenced when players perform comebacks by utilising risky parries, a sign of its strong legacy in FGC culture.

These exciting moments are often furthered by expressive and fast commentary, a staple of FGC events. The Wombo combo, a clip taken during a 2-vs-2 game of Super Smash Bros. Melee, saw commentators Brandon "HomeMadeWaffles" Collier, Phil DeBerry, and Joseph "Mang0" Marquez shouting "Wombo combo," and "Where you at?" during a set-winning team combo. These soundbites would be featured in many "MLG Montage" parody videos outside of the FGC, and "Wombo combo" has been used to describe other exceptional team combos in Super Smash Bros.

Another famous commentary moment occurred during the Guilty Gear Xrd tournament at Evo 2015, in which competitor Woshige celebrated a premature victory against his opponent, Ogawa. Commentators could be heard shouting "Woshige, not like this!" and "What are you standing up for?" before Woshige scrambles back to his seat, with Ogawa already performing a set-winning combo. The clip would be featured on ESPN, and is sometimes referenced during instances of premature celebration in the FGC.

=== Controversy and male-dominance ===
A vast majority of top competitors and commentators in the FGC are men, which has resulted in a continued discussion on how the FGC alienates women, often mentioning the prominence of objectification and misogyny among many FGC scenes. Some tournaments have hosted female-only events, such as EVO 2010's women's invitational for Street Fighter IV, in hopes of creating a more welcoming environment.

A highly publicized incident of sexual harassment occurred in 2012 at a U.S. tournament, when Street Fighter x Tekken player Aris Bakhtanians made comments about a female player's bra size and other sexist remarks, leading the woman to drop out of the event. Later, during an interview with Twitch he is quoted as saying that; "sexual harassment is part of a culture, and if you remove that from the fighting game community, it's not the fighting game community." He later apologized for his comments following backlash, stating "I felt that the culture of a scene I have been a part of for over 15 years was being threatened."

== Tournaments ==
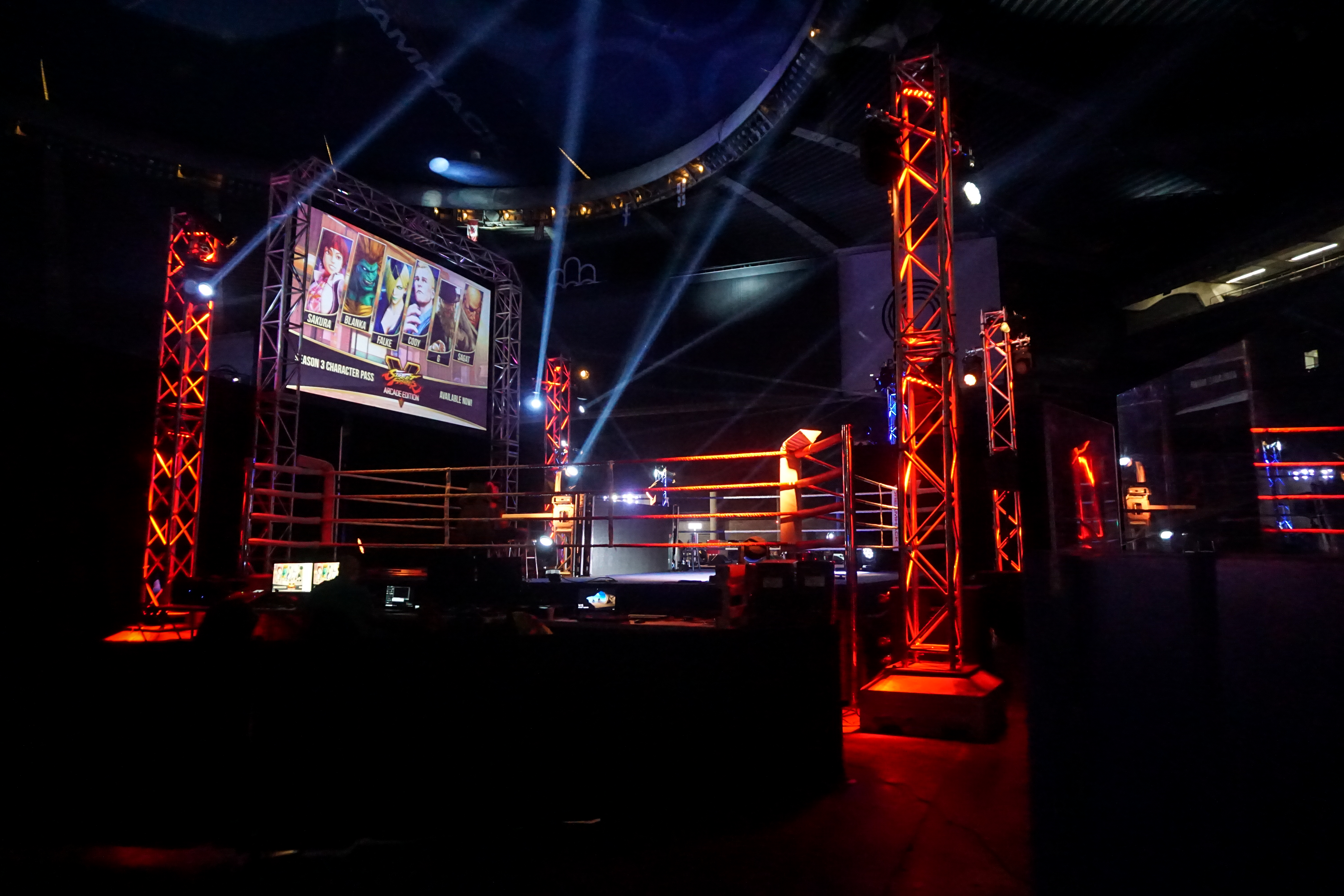
DreamHack Montreal was part of the 2018 Capcom Pro Tour.

Hundreds of online and offline tournaments are held worldwide every year, ranging anywhere in size from less than ten to over 10,000 entrants, (Note: Roughly 11,000 competitors registered to compete at Evo 2018, according to Dot Esports.) depending on the location, entry fee, prize pot, and game or range of games available. Tournaments are typically run through grassroots community efforts, although an increasing number of tournaments are being sponsored by stakeholders like Capcom, Twitch, and Red Bull.

Examples of large fighting game tournaments and tournament series include:

- Capcom Cup (final event of the Capcom Pro Tour)
- Community Effort Orlando (abbreviated as "CEO")
- DreamHack
- Esports World Cup
- Evolution Championship Series (abbreviated as "Evo")
- Genesis (Super Smash Bros.)
- Pokémon World Championships (Pokkén Tournament)
- Tougeki – Super Battle Opera (defunct)
- VSFighting

== Bibliography ==
- Harper, Todd, The Culture of Digital Fighting Games: Performance and Practice, Routledge Studies in New Media and Cyberculture, 2013
