= Marvel vs. Capcom =

Series of crossover fighting games

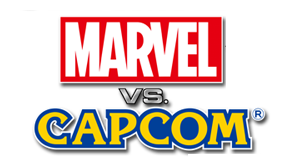
- Logo used for Marvel vs. Capcom 3: Fate of Two Worlds / Ultimate Marvel vs. Capcom 3
- Genre: Fighting
- Developers: Capcom; Backbone Entertainment (Note: Backbone Entertainment developed the PlayStation 3 and Xbox 360 versions of Marvel vs. Capcom 2: New Age of Heroes.); Eighting (Note: Eighting co-developed Marvel vs. Capcom 3: Fate of Two Worlds and Ultimate Marvel vs. Capcom 3 with Capcom.); Iron Galaxy Studios (Note: Iron Galaxy Studios developed Marvel vs. Capcom Origins.)
- Publishers: Capcom; Virgin Interactive Entertainment (Note: Virgin Interactive Entertainment published the Dreamcast versions of Marvel vs. Capcom: Clash of Super Heroes and Marvel vs. Capcom 2: New Age of Heroes in Europe.)
- Platforms: Arcade, Dreamcast, iOS, Microsoft Windows, Nintendo Switch, PlayStation, PlayStation 2, PlayStation 3, PlayStation 4, PlayStation Vita, Sega Saturn, Xbox, Xbox 360, Xbox One
- First release: X-Men vs. Street Fighter; September 1996
- Latest release: Marvel vs. Capcom Fighting Collection: Arcade Classics; September 12, 2024

Marvel vs. Capcom (Note: Japanese: マーヴル VS. カプコン, Hepburn: Māvuru bāsasu Kapukon) is a series of crossover fighting games developed and published by Capcom, featuring characters from their video game franchises and comic book series published by Marvel Comics. The series originated as coin-operated arcade games; later releases were specifically developed for home consoles, handhelds, and personal computers.

Its gameplay borrows heavily from Capcom's previous Marvel-licensed fighting games X-Men: Children of the Atom and Marvel Super Heroes; however, instead of focusing on single combat, the games incorporated tag team battles. Players form teams of two or three characters and, controlling one fighter at a time, attempt to damage and knock out their opponents. Players can switch out their characters during the match, allowing team members to replenish their health and prolong their ability to fight. The series' gameplay is distinguished from other fighting game franchises due to its character assist mechanics and emphasis on aerial combat.

The Marvel vs. Capcom series has received generally positive reviews from critics, who have praised its fast-paced gameplay, vibrant visuals, and wealth of playable characters. The series has enjoyed broad appeal, selling approximately 13 million units as of 2025.

== Games ==
Release timeline
1996	X-Men vs. Street Fighter
1997	Marvel Super Heroes vs. Street Fighter
1998	Marvel vs. Capcom: Clash of Super Heroes
1999
2000	Marvel vs. Capcom 2: New Age of Heroes
2001–2008
2009	Marvel vs. Capcom 2: New Age of Heroes (HD remaster)
2010
2011	Marvel vs. Capcom 3: Fate of Two Worlds
2011	Ultimate Marvel vs. Capcom 3
2012	Marvel vs. Capcom Origins
2013–2016
2017	Marvel vs. Capcom: Infinite
2018–2023
2024	Marvel vs. Capcom Fighting Collection: Arcade Classics

Main games

- X-Men vs. Street Fighter was initially released as an arcade game in 1996. The game was later ported to the Sega Saturn in 1997 and PlayStation in 1998. It established the series' basic gameplay conventions by combining Street Fighter-style combat with tag team features. X-Men vs. Street Fighter also borrowed gameplay concepts from Capcom's previous Marvel Comics-licensed fighting games, X-Men: Children of the Atom and Marvel Super Heroes.
- Marvel Super Heroes vs. Street Fighter was released in arcades in 1997. It was then ported to the Sega Saturn in 1998 and PlayStation in 1999. The game expanded the playable roster to the larger Marvel Universe, introducing characters such as Captain America, Hulk, and Spider-Man. It was also responsible for introducing character assist moves to the franchise, a gameplay element which would influence future Marvel vs. Capcom installments.
- Marvel vs. Capcom: Clash of Super Heroes debuted in arcades in 1998. Ports to the Dreamcast and PlayStation soon followed in 1999. Rather than strictly using Street Fighter characters, the game included characters from other Capcom video game franchises, such as Mega Man, Morrigan, and Strider Hiryu. It removed the character assist feature used in Marvel Super Heroes vs. Street Fighter and implemented its own system, which randomly allocated guest characters to each player.
- Marvel vs. Capcom 2: New Age of Heroes was released in arcades in 2000 and ported to the Dreamcast within the same year. The game received ports to the PlayStation 2 and Xbox in 2002. It was then re-released for the Xbox 360 and PlayStation 3 through the Xbox Live Arcade and PlayStation Network, respectively, in 2009. Lastly, a version for iOS devices was released in 2012. Featuring a large playable roster, Marvel vs. Capcom 2 reused the assist features from Marvel Super Heroes vs. Street Fighter and changed the series' two-on-two battle system to three-on-three fights.
- Marvel vs. Capcom 3: Fate of Two Worlds was released for PlayStation 3 and Xbox 360 in 2011. The series' traditional sprites transitioned into 3D character models while retaining the 2D-style combat. The game includes various gameplay features designed to make it more accessible to newer players, such as the additions of a comeback mechanic and a simplified control scheme.
- Ultimate Marvel vs. Capcom 3, a standalone updated edition of the original Marvel vs. Capcom 3, was released for PlayStation 3, PlayStation Vita, and Xbox 360 in 2011. The game was also released for the PlayStation 4 via the PlayStation Network in 2016; releases for the Xbox One via the Xbox Live Arcade and Microsoft Windows via Steam followed in 2017. It features new characters, stages, modes, and other enhancements to improve game balance and online functionality.
- Marvel vs. Capcom: Infinite was released in 2017 for PlayStation 4, Xbox One, and Microsoft Windows. It features two-on-two battles, similar to earlier Marvel vs. Capcom games, and removes traditional assist moves in favor of its own dual-character combo system. The game also implements a gameplay mechanic involving the Infinity Stones, which grants players unique abilities and upgrades depending on the stone selected. It is the first game to feature a cinematic story mode.

Compilations

- Marvel vs. Capcom Origins, a compilation game which includes Marvel Super Heroes and Marvel vs. Capcom: Clash of Super Heroes, was released for the PlayStation 3 and Xbox 360 through the PlayStation Network and Xbox Live Arcade, respectively, in 2012. It features high-definition visuals, online multiplayer, dynamic challenges, and unlockables.
- Marvel vs. Capcom Fighting Collection: Arcade Classics is a compilation comprising all seven Capcom-developed Marvel games originally released for arcades: The Punisher, X-Men: Children of the Atom, Marvel Super Heroes, X-Men vs. Street Fighter, Marvel Super Heroes vs. Street Fighter, Marvel vs. Capcom: Clash of Super Heroes, and Marvel vs. Capcom 2: New Age of Heroes. It was released in 2024 for Nintendo Switch, PlayStation 4, and Microsoft Windows and in 2025 for Xbox One.

=== Related media ===
In 2011, a series of Minimates based on the playable characters from Marvel vs. Capcom 3: Fate of Two Worlds were released by Art Asylum.

Udon Entertainment published Marvel vs. Capcom: Official Complete Works art book consisting of promotional artwork, sketches and bonus material from the video game collaborations between Marvel and Capcom, beginning with the 1993 arcade game The Punisher to Ultimate Marvel vs. Capcom 3. It contains contributions from a variety of artists and illustrators, including Akiman, Bengus, Shinkiro, Joe Madureira, Adi Granov, Joe Ng, Long Vo, Chamba, Adam Warren and Takeshi Miyazawa. Official Complete Works made its international debut at San Diego Comic-Con on July 11, 2012, in an exclusive hardcover edition. The hardcover also featured a wrap-around cover designed by Udon Entertainment and Capcom artist Alvin Lee, and digitally-painted by Udon's Genzoman. A standard-format softcover was released in November 2012 by Diamond Comics. An expanded edition, titled Marvel vs. Capcom: Ultimate Complete Works, was released in 2025.

Within the Marvel Comics multiverse, the Marvel vs. Capcom universe is designated as Earth-30847. The series' iteration of Spider-Man appears in the crossover event Spider-Verse (2014–15), where he is defeated by Morlun as he hunts Spider-Totems across different worlds. In 2017, Marvel Entertainment had released a comic book prequel to Marvel vs. Capcom: Infinite known as Marvel vs. Capcom: Infinite Horizons, that features Ryu and the Hulk fighting against the creatures from Capcom's Monster Hunter franchise.

== Gameplay ==
A screenshot from Marvel vs. Capcom 3: Fate of Two Worlds, featuring Hsien-Ko and Felicia from Capcom's Darkstalkers series and Iron Man from the Marvel Universe

The basic gameplay of the Marvel vs. Capcom series was originally derived from X-Men: Children of the Atom and Marvel Super Heroes. Players compete in battle using characters with unique moves and special attacks. Using a combination of joystick movements and button presses, players must execute various moves to damage their opponent and deplete their life gauge, or alternatively, have the most cumulative health when the timer runs out. However, unlike the two aforementioned games, which focus on single combat, the Marvel vs. Capcom series revolve around tag team-based combat. Instead of choosing a single character, players select multiple characters to form teams of two or three. Each character on the team is given their own life gauge. Players control one character at a time, while the others await off-screen. Players are also free to swap between their characters at any point during the match. As characters take damage, portions of their life gauge will turn red, known as "red health", which represents the amount of health that a character can recover if the player tags them out. The off-screen, dormant characters will slowly replenish their red health, allowing players to cycle through their team members and prolong their ability to fight. Furthermore, as characters deal and receive damage, a colored meter at the bottom of the screen known as the "Hyper Combo Gauge" will gradually fill. By expending meter from their Hyper Combo Gauge, players can perform "Hyper Combos" – powerful, cinematic attacks that deal heavy damage to the opponent – in addition to several other special techniques. If one character loses all of their health, they are knocked out and the next available fighter will automatically come into play.

Each successive Marvel vs. Capcom installment has added, removed, or altered gameplay elements over the course of the series' history. X-Men vs. Street Fighter added two-on-two tag team features. Marvel Super Heroes vs. Street Fighter introduced the concept of the "assist" by allowing the player to summon their off-screen partner to perform a special move without switching characters. This feature was replaced in Marvel vs. Capcom: Clash of Super Heroes, which instead randomly allocated an unplayable guest character with a preset assist move before each match; in addition, assists were limited to only a few uses per round. The assist features from Marvel Super Heroes vs. Street Fighter were re-incorporated into the following sequel, Marvel vs. Capcom 2: New Age of Heroes, once again granting players the ability to call in their off-screen characters at any time during the match without constraint. Marvel vs. Capcom 2 also increased the number of characters per team by one, providing a three-on-three battle format. Marvel vs. Capcom 3: Fate of Two Worlds introduced "X-Factor", a comeback mechanic which offers increased damage, speed, and red health regeneration for a limited time upon activation. Marvel vs. Capcom: Infinite reverts to two-on-two partner battles and removes traditional character assists, in favour of a free-form tag system where the second character switches in at any point, irrespective of whether the player is mid-combo or in air. Infinite also implements the Infinity Stones as a gameplay mechanic, where each of the six stones grants unique abilities and enhancements to the player.

Another gameplay element that helps to distinguish the Marvel vs. Capcom series from other fighting game franchises is its emphasis on aerial combat. Every character in the Marvel vs. Capcom series is given a "Launcher" move, which sends the opponent flying up into the air. The player can then choose to follow up immediately by using a "Super Jump", which allows a character to jump much higher than normal, in order to continue their combo; these airborne combos are called "Air Combos" or "Aerial Raves". Marvel vs. Capcom 3 introduced a gameplay feature known as the "Team Aerial Combo" or "Aerial Exchange", giving players the opportunity to extend their Air Combos further by quickly tagging in their other characters while mid-air.

As Capcom's design philosophy for the series has changed to appeal to a wider audience, the control scheme has been repeatedly modified to accommodate people less familiar with the fighting game genre. The first three installments utilized the same layout of six attack buttons, separated as three pairs of light, medium, and hard punches and kicks. In Marvel vs. Capcom 2, in order to make the game more accessible, the layout was tweaked to four attack buttons, consisting of two pairs of light and heavy punches and kicks, and two dedicated assist buttons. The control scheme was further simplified with the release of Marvel vs. Capcom 3, which included three attack buttons designated to undefined light, medium, and hard attacks, two assist buttons, and an "exchange button" used to perform Launchers and switch between characters during Air Combos. In addition, Marvel vs. Capcom 3 included two different control scheme options: Normal Mode and Simple Mode. Simple Mode, designed for casual players, allows players to perform special moves and Hyper Combos with single button presses at the expense of limiting a character's available moveset. Though Marvel vs. Capcom: Infinite returned to a control scheme similar to Marvel vs. Capcom 2 ― with four attack buttons, one dedicated button for character tagging, and another for activating Infinity Stone abilities ― it introduced a new "auto-combo" system to improve accessibility that allows players to repeatedly mash the light punch input to automatically execute ground and air combos without any damage penalty.

== Characters ==
Marvel vs. Capcom has featured over 100 playable fighters, primarily drawn from comic book series published by Marvel Comics and video games franchises developed and produced by Capcom. The games have introduced a few original characters, which include Norimaro from Marvel Super Heroes vs. Street Fighter, and Amingo, Ruby Heart, and SonSon from Marvel vs. Capcom 2: New Age of Heroes. In addition to the playable cast, other characters from the Marvel and Capcom universes make appearances in the games in varying capacities. Both Marvel Super Heroes vs. Street Fighter and Marvel vs. Capcom: Clash of Super Heroes include secret characters which can be played by inputting specific sequences of joystick movements on the character select screen. These secret characters consist of palette swaps of existing fighters with different moveset properties. Clash of Super Heroes also has unplayable summon characters as part of its "Guest Character/Special Partner" assist system.

Many Marvel vs. Capcom installments also allow players to fight as the games' boss characters in special game modes, with the exception of Abyss from Marvel vs. Capcom 2. Characters that have not been playable frequently make cameo appearances in the games' cutscenes and stage backgrounds. Lastly, numerous non-playable Marvel and Capcom characters are featured as "Ability Cards" in the Heroes and Heralds game mode in Ultimate Marvel vs. Capcom 3. Out of all the playable characters, Ryu and Chun-Li are the only ones to have appeared in every game released thus far.

List of playable characters
Character	Side	XvSF	MSHvSF	MvC	MvC2	MvC3	UMvC3	MvCI
Akuma	Capcom (Street Fighter)	Yes	Yes (Note: Players can fight as final boss characters Apocalypse, Cyber Akuma, Galactus, and Onslaught against waves of AI-controlled enemies in their games' respective boss modes.)	No (Note: In Marvel vs. Capcom: Clash of Super Heroes, Ryu has an ability called "Complete Change", which allows him to change his moveset into Ken's or Akuma's.)	Yes	Yes	Yes	No
Albert Wesker	Capcom (Resident Evil)	No	No	No	No	Yes	Yes	No
Amaterasu	Capcom (Ōkami)	No	No	No	No	Yes	Yes	No
Amingo	Capcom (Marvel vs. Capcom)	No	No	No	Yes	No	No	No
Anakaris	Capcom (Darkstalkers)	No	No	No	Yes	No	No	No
Apocalypse	Marvel	Yes	Yes	No	No	No	No	No
Arthur	Capcom (Ghosts 'n Goblins)	No	No	No (Note: Appears as a summonable assist character.)	No	Yes	Yes	Yes
B.B. Hood	Capcom (Darkstalkers)	No	No	No	Yes	No	No	No
Blackheart	Marvel	No	Yes (Note: Alternate, palette-swapped versions of Blackheart (Mephisto), Captain America (U.S. Agent), Charlie (Shadow), Chun-Li (Shadow Lady), Hulk (Orange Hulk), Morrigan (Lilith), Sakura (Sunburned Sakura), Spider-Man (Armored Spider-Man), Venom (Hyper Venom), War Machine (Mega War Machine), and Zangief (Mech-Zangief) appear as secret characters.)	No	Yes	No	No	No
Black Panther	Marvel	No	No	No	No	No	No	DLC
Black Widow	Marvel	No	No	No	No	No	No	DLC
Cable	Marvel	No	No	No	Yes	No	No	No
Cammy	Capcom (Street Fighter)	Yes	No	No	Yes	No	No	No
Captain America	Marvel	No	Yes	Yes	Yes	Yes	Yes	Yes
Captain Commando	Capcom (Captain Commando)	No	No	Yes	Yes	No	No	No
Captain Marvel	Marvel	No	No	No	No	No	No	Yes
Charlie Nash	Capcom (Street Fighter)	Yes	Yes	No	Yes	No	No	No
Chris Redfield	Capcom (Resident Evil)	No	No	No	No	Yes	Yes	Yes
Chun-Li	Capcom (Street Fighter)	Yes	Yes	Yes	Yes	Yes	Yes	Yes
Colossus	Marvel (X-Men)	No	No	No	Yes	No	No	No
Crimson Viper	Capcom (Street Fighter)	No	No	No	No	Yes	Yes	No
Cyclops	Marvel (X-Men)	Yes	Yes	No	Yes	No	No	No
Dan Hibiki	Capcom (Street Fighter)	No	Yes	No	Yes	No	No	No
Dante	Capcom (Devil May Cry)	No	No	No	No	Yes	Yes	Yes
Deadpool	Marvel	No	No	No	No	Yes	Yes	No
Dhalsim	Capcom (Street Fighter)	Yes	Yes	No	Yes	No	No	No
Doctor Doom	Marvel	No	No	No	Yes	Yes	Yes	No
Doctor Strange	Marvel	No	No	No	No	No	Yes	Yes
Dormammu	Marvel	No	No	No	No	Yes	Yes	Yes
Felicia	Capcom (Darkstalkers)	No	No	No	Yes	Yes	Yes	No
Firebrand	Capcom (Ghosts 'n Goblins)	No	No	No	No	No	Yes	Yes
Frank West	Capcom (Dead Rising)	No	No	No	No	No	Yes	Yes
Galactus	Marvel	No	No	No	No	No	Yes	No
Gambit	Marvel (X-Men)	Yes	No	Yes	Yes	No	No	No
Gamora	Marvel	No	No	No	No	No	No	Yes
Ghost Rider	Marvel	No	No	No	No	No	Yes	Yes
Guile	Capcom (Street Fighter)	No	No	No	Yes	No	No	No
Hawkeye	Marvel	No	No	No	No	No	Yes	Yes
Hayato Kanzaki	Capcom (Star Gladiator)	No	No	No	Yes	No	No	No
Hsien-Ko	Capcom (Darkstalkers)	No	No	No	No	Yes	Yes	No
Hulk	Marvel	No	Yes	Yes	Yes	Yes	Yes	Yes
Iceman	Marvel (X-Men)	No	No	No	Yes	No	No	No
Iron Fist	Marvel	No	No	No	No	No	Yes	No
Iron Man	Marvel	No	No	No	Yes	Yes	Yes	Yes
Jedah Dohma	Capcom (Darkstalkers)	No	No	No	No	No	No	Yes
Jill Valentine	Capcom (Resident Evil)	No	No	No	Yes	DLC	DLC	No
Jin Saotome	Capcom (Cyberbots)	No	No	Yes	Yes	No	No	No
Juggernaut	Marvel (X-Men)	Yes	No	No	Yes	No	No	No
Ken Masters	Capcom (Street Fighter)	Yes	Yes	No	Yes	No	No	No
Magneto	Marvel (X-Men)	Yes	No	No	Yes	Yes	Yes	No
Marrow	Marvel	No	No	No	Yes	No	No	No
M. Bison	Capcom (Street Fighter)	Yes	Yes	No	Yes	No	No	No
Mega Man	Capcom (Mega Man)	No	No	Yes	Yes	No	No	No
Mike Haggar	Capcom (Final Fight)	No	No	No	No	Yes	Yes	Yes
MODOK	Marvel	No	No	No	No	Yes	Yes	No
Hunter	Capcom (Monster Hunter)	No	No	No	No	No	No	DLC
Morrigan Aensland	Capcom (Darkstalkers)	No	No	Yes	Yes	Yes	Yes	Yes
Nathan Spencer	Capcom (Bionic Commando)	No	No	No	No	Yes	Yes	Yes
Nemesis	Capcom (Resident Evil)	No	No	No	No	No	Yes	Yes
Norimaro	Capcom (Marvel vs. Capcom)	No	Yes (Note: Norimaro is exclusive to the Japanese arcade and console versions of Marvel Super Heroes vs. Street Fighter.)	No	No	No	No	No
Nova	Marvel	No	No	No	No	No	Yes	Yes
Omega Red	Marvel (X-Men)	No	Yes	No	Yes	No	No	No
Onslaught	Marvel	No	No	Yes	No	No	No	No
Phoenix	Marvel	No	No	No	No	Yes	Yes	No
Phoenix Wright	Capcom (Ace Attorney)	No	No	No	No	No	Yes	No
Psylocke	Marvel (X-Men)	No	No	No	Yes	No	No	No
Rocket Raccoon	Marvel	No	No	No	No	No	Yes	Yes
Rogue	Marvel (X-Men)	Yes	No	No	Yes	No	No	No
Roll	Capcom (Mega Man)	No	No	Yes	Yes	No	No	No
Ruby Heart	Capcom (Marvel vs. Capcom)	No	No	No	Yes	No	No	No
Ryu	Capcom (Street Fighter)	Yes	Yes	Yes	Yes	Yes	Yes	Yes
Sabretooth	Marvel (X-Men)	Yes	No	No	Yes	No	No	No
Sakura Kasugano	Capcom (Street Fighter)	No	Yes	No	Yes	No	No	No
Sentinel	Marvel (X-Men)	No	No	No	Yes	Yes	Yes	No
Servbot	Capcom (Mega Man)	No	No	No	Yes	No	No	No
She-Hulk	Marvel	No	No	No	No	Yes	Yes	No
Shuma-Gorath	Marvel	No	Yes	No	Yes	DLC	DLC	No
Sigma	Capcom (Mega Man)	No	No	No	No	No	No	DLC
Silver Samurai	Marvel (X-Men)	No	No	No	Yes	No	No	No
SonSon	Capcom (Marvel vs. Capcom)	No	No	No	Yes	No	No	No
Spider-Man	Marvel	No	Yes	Yes	Yes	Yes	Yes	Yes
Spiral	Marvel (X-Men)	No	No	No	Yes	No	No	No
Storm	Marvel (X-Men)	Yes	No	No	Yes	Yes	Yes	No
Strider Hiryu	Capcom (Strider)	No	No	Yes	Yes	No	Yes	Yes
Super-Skrull	Marvel	No	No	No	No	Yes	Yes	No
Taskmaster	Marvel	No	No	No	No	Yes	Yes	No
Thanos	Marvel	No	No	No	Yes	No	No	Yes
Thor	Marvel	No	No	No	No	Yes	Yes	Yes
Trish	Capcom (Devil May Cry)	No	No	No	No	Yes	Yes	No
Tron Bonne	Capcom (Mega Man)	No	No	No	Yes	Yes	Yes	No
Ultron	Marvel	No	No	No	No	No	No	Yes
Venom	Marvel	No	No	Yes	Yes	No	No	DLC
Vergil	Capcom (Devil May Cry)	No	No	No	No	No	Yes	No
Joe	Capcom (Viewtiful Joe)	No	No	No	No	Yes	Yes	No
War Machine	Marvel	No	No	Yes	Yes	No	No	No
Winter Soldier	Marvel	No	No	No	No	No	No	DLC
Wolverine	Marvel (X-Men)	Yes	Yes	Yes	Yes (Note: An alternate version of Wolverine, named Bone Claw Wolverine, appears as a separate playable character in Marvel vs. Capcom 2: New Age of Heroes.)	Yes	Yes	No
X	Capcom (Mega Man)	No	No	No	No	No	No	Yes
X-23	Marvel	No	No	No	No	Yes	Yes	No
Zangief	Capcom (Street Fighter)	Yes	Yes	Yes	Yes	No	No	No
Zero	Capcom (Mega Man)	No	No	No	No	Yes	Yes	Yes
Total (Note: Totals include playable boss characters and downloadable content characters, where applicable.)		18	20	17	56	38	51	36

== History ==
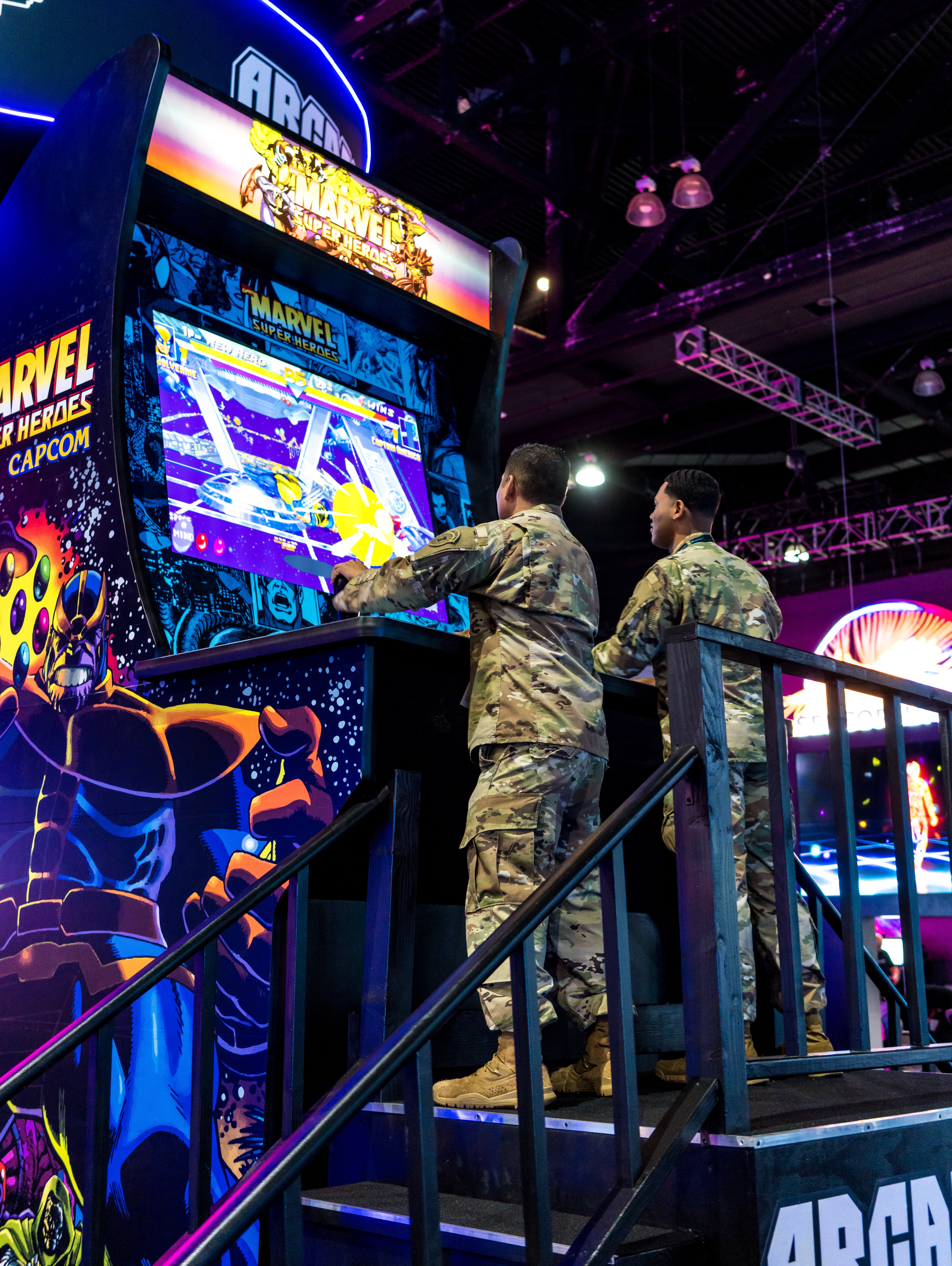
Marvel Super Heroes at E3 2019

Capcom's partnership with Marvel began in 1993 with the release of The Punisher, an arcade beat 'em up based on the comic book series of the same name. Capcom then created their first Marvel-licensed fighting game, X-Men: Children of the Atom, in 1994. Marvel Super Heroes soon followed in 1995. Many of the gameplay mechanics used in the Marvel vs. Capcom series were first developed and refined in these two fighting games, serving as precursors to the series. In 2011, then-current Capcom USA Strategic Marketing Director of Online and Community Seth Killian stated that many fighting game aficionados, including himself, consider them to have laid the foundation for the series.

The idea for implementing tag teams was allegedly inspired by an easter egg from Capcom's own 1995 fighting game Street Fighter Alpha: Warriors' Dreams. In a secret "Dramatic Battle" mode, two players, controlling Ryu and Ken, were able to fight against an AI-controlled M. Bison at the same time. The easter egg itself had drawn inspiration from the final battle sequence of Street Fighter II: The Animated Movie, which featured a similar fight scene. Recognizing the uniqueness of a team-up concept, Capcom began to work on their next project. After their earlier licensing ventures with Children of the Atom and Marvel Super Heroes, the company decided to combine Marvel's X-Men franchise, their own Street Fighter franchise, and their team-up concept, leading to the creation of X-Men vs. Street Fighter. The game debuted in Japanese arcades in 1996, establishing the series' fast-paced, tag team-based gameplay style.

Marvel Super Heroes vs. Street Fighter was then released in 1997, which replaced most of the X-Men cast with other heroes from the Marvel Universe and introduced the character assist mechanic. Marvel vs. Capcom: Clash of Super Heroes later followed in 1998, exchanging the majority of the Street Fighter cast with characters from other Capcom video games series, such as Mega Man and Darkstalkers. In 1999, Capcom announced the development of yet another sequel, called Marvel vs. Capcom 2: New Age of Heroes. Marvel vs. Capcom 2 heavily re-used assets from previous Capcom-developed games, including Street Fighter Alpha, Darkstalkers, and the earlier Marvel vs. Capcom titles, resulting in a large roster of 56 playable characters. Shortly after the release of the PlayStation 2 and Xbox ports for Marvel vs. Capcom 2, Capcom lost the use of the Marvel license, putting the series on an indefinite hiatus. However, with the resurgence of 2D fighting games in 2008, owing to the success of Street Fighter IV, Marvel requested Capcom to collaborate with them once again. Capcom would announce the development of the next installment in the Marvel vs. Capcom series, Marvel vs. Capcom 3: Fate of Two Worlds, in 2010. The game was eventually released in 2011. An updated version of Marvel vs. Capcom 3, titled Ultimate Marvel vs. Capcom 3, was released later in the same year. The high-definition compilation game Marvel vs. Capcom Origins was then released in 2012.

Following the release of Ultimate Marvel vs. Capcom 3 for the PlayStation Vita in 2012, Marvel's new parent company, The Walt Disney Company, which acquired Marvel in 2009, chose not to renew Capcom's license with the Marvel characters, instead opting to put them in its own self-published Disney Infinity series. As a result, Capcom had to pull both Ultimate Marvel vs. Capcom 3 and Marvel vs. Capcom 2 off their online platforms in 2013. However, in 2016, Disney announced its decision to cancel the Disney Infinity series, discontinue self-publishing efforts, and switch to a licensing-only model, allowing them to license their characters to third-party game developers, including Capcom. Marvel vs. Capcom: Infinite was revealed in 2016, and then released in 2017.

In June 2024, Capcom announced Marvel vs. Capcom Fighting Collection: Arcade Classics for Nintendo Switch, PlayStation 4 and Windows. The compilation features the seven Marvel titles developed and published by Capcom for arcades from The Punisher through Marvel vs. Capcom 2: New Age of Heroes. It notably marks the series' debut on Nintendo platforms, the first time the classic entries have been made available on PC, as well as the first general re-releases for Marvel Super Heroes, Clash of Super Heroes and New Age of Heroes since the original Origins compilation and the remaster of Marvel vs. Capcom 2 were digitally delisted from seventh generation console storefronts.

== Reception ==
Aggregate review scores
Game	GameRankings	Metacritic
X-Men vs. Street Fighter	64% (PS); 82% (SAT)	N/A
Marvel Super Heroes vs. Street Fighter	74% (PS); 77% (SAT)	N/A
Marvel vs. Capcom: Clash of Super Heroes	80% (DC); 75% (PS)	N/A
Marvel vs. Capcom 2: New Age of Heroes	90% (DC); 76% (PS2); 67% (Xbox); 83% (X360); 86% (PS3); 61% (iOS)	90/100 (DC); 76/100 (PS2); 65/100 (Xbox); 82/100 (X360); 85/100 (PS3); 64/100 (iOS)
Marvel vs. Capcom 3: Fate of Two Worlds	86% (X360); 86% (PS3)	85/100 (X360); 84/100 (PS3)
Ultimate Marvel vs. Capcom 3	81% (PS3); 81% (X360); 82% (Vita); 79% (PS4)	80/100 (PS3); 79/100 (X360); 80/100 (Vita); 77/100 (PS4)
Marvel vs. Capcom Origins	72% (PS3); 80% (X360)	72/100 (PS3); 78/100 (X360)
Marvel vs. Capcom: Infinite	71% (PS4); 77% (XONE); 70% (PC)	72/100 (PS4); 77/100 (XONE); 69/100 (PC)
Marvel vs. Capcom Fighting Collection: Arcade Classics		(NS) 86/100 (PC) 86/100 (PS4) 86/100 (XONE) 88/100

The Marvel vs. Capcom series has received reviews ranging from average to positive from critics. According to Capcom President and COO Haruhiro Tsujimoto, the games have enjoyed broad appeal, especially in markets outside of Japan. As of December 2023, 11 million units of the series have been sold.

The series' first three titles, X-Men vs. Street Fighter, Marvel Super Heroes vs. Street Fighter, and Marvel vs. Capcom: Clash of Super Heroes, received praise for their frantic gameplay style, visual flair, playable character rosters, and the quality of their sprite animations. The games' Dreamcast and Sega Saturn ports were also lauded for their technical performance, matching the capabilities of the arcade versions. Conversely, the PlayStation ports were criticized for their removal of tag team battles and noticeable decline in frame rate and animation quality – changes which stemmed from the console's RAM limitations.

Marvel vs. Capcom 2: New Age of Heroes received similar praise, with particular attention given towards the large cast and the addition of three-on-three combat. The Dreamcast, PlayStation 2, and Xbox versions were criticized for their lack of online multiplayer support outside Japan. These concerns were addressed with the release of the PlayStation 3 and Xbox 360 ports, which reviewers commended for their smooth online experience. A common source of complaints was the game's jazz-inspired soundtrack, which critics deemed as out of place.

In addition to its character variety and visual presentation, Marvel vs. Capcom 3: Fate of Two Worlds garnered praise for simplifying the series' combat mechanics and control scheme, thus making it more accessible for newcomers. Ultimate Marvel vs. Capcom was applauded for its additions to the character roster, gameplay tweaks, and improved online functionality. Both games, however, were criticized for their lack of game modes and single-player content. Marvel vs. Capcom Origins was praised for preserving the original arcade releases' integrity and its addition of online multiplayer, dynamic challenges, and unlockable content; however, in remaining faithful to the arcade versions, some reviewers criticized the games for their outdated gameplay and unbalanced fighters.

Marvel vs. Capcom: Infinite received mixed reviews, with critics praising its implementation of new gameplay mechanics, such as the "Active Switch" combo system and the addition of the six Infinity Stones. On the other hand, the game was criticized for its presentation, particularly its art direction, and its character roster.

In 2012, Complex ranked Marvel vs. Capcom at number 37 on the list of the best video game franchises, commenting that "a frenetic pace and over the top effects work together to make this franchise stand the test of time".

== See also ==
- Marvel Tokon: Fighting Souls - A 4v4 tag-based fighting game developed by Arc System Works and published by Sony Interactive Entertainment that derives mechanically from and has been favorably compared towards the Marvel vs. Capcom series, for its use of the Marvel license and shared gameplay conventions.
- SNK vs. Capcom - Another fighting game crossover series featuring Capcom characters.
- Mortal Kombat vs. DC Universe - A crossover between Mortal Kombat and DC Comics characters.
