= Marvel vs. Capcom 2: New Age of Heroes =

2000 video game

- Arcade flyer
- Developer: Capcom (Note: Backbone Entertainment developed the PlayStation 3 and Xbox 360 versions of the game.)
- Publishers: Capcom; Dreamcast: JP/NA: Capcom; PAL: Virgin Interactive
- Producer: Yoshihiro Sudou
- Designers: Tatsuya Nakae; Katsuhiro Eguchi; Shintaro Kojima; Oni Suzuki; Shinichirō Obata; Hidetoshi Ishizawa
- Artist: Bengus
- Composers: Tetsuya Shibata; Mitsuhiko Takano
- Series: Marvel vs. Capcom
- Platforms: Arcade, Dreamcast, PlayStation 2, Xbox, Xbox 360, PlayStation 3, iOS
- Release: March 23, 2000: Arcade; JP: March 23, 2000; NA: May 2000 Dreamcast; JP: March 30, 2000; NA: June 29, 2000; EU: July 16, 2000 PlayStation 2; JP: September 19, 2002; NA: November 19, 2002; EU: November 29, 2002 Xbox; JP: September 19, 2002; NA: March 30, 2003 Xbox 360; WW: July 29, 2009 PlayStation 3; WW: August 13, 2009 iOS; WW: April 25, 2012
- Genre: Fighting
- Modes: Single-player, multiplayer
- Arcade system: Sega NAOMI

Marvel vs. Capcom 2: New Age of Heroes (Note: Japanese: マーヴル VS. カプコン 2 ニュー エイジ オブ ヒーローズ, Hepburn: Māvuru bāsasu Kapukon Tsū: Nyū Eiji obu Hīrōzu) is a 2000 crossover fighting game developed and published by Capcom for arcades. It is the fourth installment in the Marvel vs. Capcom series, which features characters from both Capcom's video game franchises and comic book series published by Marvel Comics. The game received ports to the Dreamcast in 2000, the PlayStation 2 and Xbox in 2002, the Xbox 360 and PlayStation 3 in 2009, and iOS in 2012.

In Marvel vs. Capcom 2, players select a team of characters from the Marvel and Capcom universes to engage in combat and attempt to knock out their opponents. While the game uses similar tag team-based game mechanics to the series' previous iteration, Marvel vs. Capcom: Clash of Super Heroes (1998), it features several significant changes, such as three-on-three gameplay, a new character assist system, and a more simplified control scheme. The character artwork uses traditional 2D-animated sprites, while the backgrounds and visual effects are rendered in 3D. This makes Marvel vs. Capcom 2 the first game in the franchise to feature 2.5D graphics.

The game was acclaimed by critics, who praised its gameplay, visuals, and character roster, while criticizing its soundtrack, initial lack of online multiplayer support outside Japan, and game balance. Since its release, it has been considered one of the greatest games of all time especially in the fighting game genre. Following its release, Capcom lost the use of the Marvel Comics license, putting the series on a decade-long hiatus until the release of 2011's Marvel vs. Capcom 3: Fate of Two Worlds.

== Gameplay ==
Jill Valentine performs a healing assist on Ryu during his battle against the Hulk. Marvel vs. Capcom 2 re-implements the assist system from Marvel Super Heroes vs. Street Fighter, which had been removed in Clash of Super Heroes.

Marvel vs. Capcom 2: New Age of Heroes is the fourth installment in the Marvel vs. Capcom series of tag team-based fighting games. Players select a team of three characters to compete in a one-on-one battle, as opposed to teams of two characters in the series' previous entry, Marvel vs. Capcom: Clash of Super Heroes. The game introduces a more refined version of the "Variable System" used in past Marvel vs. Capcom games, which allows players to tag in other team members at any point during the match. Unlike Clash of Super Heroes, which features unplayable partner characters that the player can summon at will, Marvel vs. Capcom 2 re-implements the "Variable Assist" gameplay mechanic introduced in Marvel Super Heroes vs. Street Fighter, allowing players to call upon one of their off-screen team members to perform a single special move to aid them. Each playable character possesses three different types of assists, denoted by the Greek letters α, β, and γ, which can range from projectile attacks to healing moves. Assist characters receive extra damage if struck by the opponent. As characters fight, the team members not in play will also slowly regenerate their life gauges. A match lasts until one team completely runs out of vitality for all three fighters; if the match timer reaches zero before either team is knocked out, the player with the most remaining health is declared the winner.

Similar to prior installments, as characters deal and receive damage, a colored meter at the bottom of the screen known as the "Hyper Combo Gauge" will gradually fill. When the meter is full, the player can use it to perform several special techniques, such as "hyper combos", powerful attacks that deal heavy damage; "delayed hyper combos", which allow the player to execute multiple hyper combos consecutively; and "variable combinations", which summon the player's entire team to use their hyper combos simultaneously. The game also introduces a new gameplay mechanic called the "snapback", which forces the opponent to switch characters. Marvel vs. Capcom 2 features a modified version of the six-button control scheme from Clash of Super Heroes. Instead of six attack buttons separated as three pairs of low, medium, and high-strength punches and kicks, the game utilizes a setup of four attack buttons and two assist buttons.

=== Modes ===
Marvel vs. Capcom 2: New Age of Heroes features both single-player and multiplayer game modes. The game has an Arcade Mode, where the player must defeat seven AI-controlled teams to reach the final boss character, Abyss, who sports three different forms. Unlike previous games in the series, Marvel vs. Capcom 2 does not have character-specific endings, as the player will earn the same ending regardless of the characters they used to complete Arcade Mode. Versus Mode allows two players to compete against one another. Players can practice moves and combos in Training Mode, where they can also adjust certain settings, such as the number of bars available in the Hyper Combo Gauge. Score Attack, similar to Arcade Mode, pits the player against waves of AI-controlled characters, trying to accumulate the highest score possible without using a continue.

The arcade version of Marvel vs. Capcom 2 includes an experience system which unlocks hidden characters after a certain number of experience points are earned. This system was removed in the console versions in favor of the "Secret Factor" menu, where the player can buy hidden characters, stage backgrounds, and color schemes using points earned through normal play. The Xbox 360 and PlayStation 3 versions both featured online multiplayer, which includes player matches, ranked matches, and lobbies. The Japanese release of Marvel vs. Capcom 2 for the Dreamcast also featured online play through Capcom's "Match Service" network, limited to two separate Dreamcast systems.

=== Playable characters ===
Marvel vs. Capcom 2: New Age of Heroes contains a roster of 56 playable characters. The roster features characters from various Marvel Comics properties, such as The Avengers and X-Men, and Capcom video game franchises, including Street Fighter, Darkstalkers, and Mega Man. The game also introduces three original characters: Amingo, a cactus-like creature; Ruby Heart, a French-speaking air pirate (who was originally envisioned as a character for the Darkstalkers series); and SonSon, a bō-wielding monkey girl and granddaughter of the protagonist from the 1984 Capcom arcade game SonSon. In the arcade version, half of the characters are unlocked from the start while the other half are unlocked as revenue increases. In some console versions, 24 characters are available from the start and the remaining 32 must be unlocked using experience points. In the Xbox 360 and PlayStation 3 versions, all start unlocked.

==== Marvel ====
- Blackheart
- Cable
- Captain America
- Colossus
- Cyclops
- Doctor Doom
- Gambit
- Hulk
- Iceman
- Iron Man
- Juggernaut
- Magneto
- Marrow
- Omega Red
- Psylocke
- Rogue
- Sabretooth
- Sentinel
- Shuma-Gorath
- Silver Samurai
- Spider-Man
- Spiral
- Storm
- Thanos
- Venom
- War Machine
- Wolverine
- Wolverine (with bone claws)

==== Capcom ====
- Akuma
- Amingo
- Anakaris
- B.B. Hood
- Cammy White
- Captain Commando
- Charlie
- Chun-Li
- Dan Hibiki
- Dhalsim
- Felicia
- Guile
- Hayato Kanzaki
- Jill Valentine
- Jin Saotome
- Ken Masters
- M. Bison
- Mega Man
- Morrigan Aensland
- Roll
- Ruby Heart
- Ryu
- Sakura Kasugano
- Servbot
- SonSon
- Strider Hiryu
- Tron Bonne
- Zangief

== Development ==
On December 1, 1999, Capcom announced that a sequel to Marvel vs. Capcom: Clash of Super Heroes was in development. It was developed for the Sega NAOMI arcade board and the Dreamcast as Capcom's first attempt at a fighting game outside of the CP System II and III hardware systems. The game was the first in the Marvel vs. Capcom series to combine hand-drawn two-dimensional sprites upon three-dimensional backgrounds. The Japanese home and arcade versions of the game were revealed to be compatible with the Dreamcast VMU. Players were able to connect their VMU to the arcade version to exchange data, earning them experience points which could be used to unlock new characters, stages, and costume colors in the home version. The experience system included three types of points: "N-Points", earned by playing through the arcade version; "D-Points", gained by playing through the Dreamcast version; and "V-Points", obtained by playing online multiplayer. The game featured online play between two Dreamcast consoles through a specialized network known as "Match Service". The service, developed by Capcom and KDD Corp, used KDD-developed technology called "Data on Demand" as a foundation, which offered transfer rates below 70 milliseconds. These features were removed in all future domestic and international ports of MvC2.

During a press conference before E3 2002, Capcom unveiled its plans to bring MvC2 over to the PlayStation 2 and Xbox. While the PS2 version allowed players to compete against one another via USB modem connections, the Xbox version did not feature Xbox Live support. Once again, online multiplayer was not available outside Japan. Online service was discontinued when Capcom began to dissolve its dial-up support in 2004.

Following the commercial and critical success of Super Street Fighter II Turbo HD Remix in 2008, Capcom intended to continue making high-definition remakes of its past games. When asked specifically about MvC2, Capcom's VP of business development and strategic planning, Christian Svensson, indicated that the game was their most requested title by fans. On April 27, 2009, Marvel and Capcom jointly announced that MvC2 would be released for the Xbox 360 via Xbox Live Arcade and the PlayStation 3 via the PlayStation Store. A demo for the PS3 version was released on April 30. When questioned about the lack of a Wii port, Svensson stated that Capcom was unable to release the game on the console due to licensing restrictions and WiiWare's file size limit.

The PS3 and Xbox 360 ports were developed by Backbone Entertainment, who previously worked with Capcom on Super Street Fighter II Turbo HD Remix. The game was built using the original Dreamcast version's code base. The online functionality in MvC2 utilized the same net code from Super Street Fighter II Turbo HD Remix. Additional changes for the PS3 and Xbox 360 versions included various filtering options for character sprites, labeled "Smooth", "Crisp", and "Classic". Widescreen support was implemented; since MvC2 was originally designed with a 4:3 aspect ratio, the developers were able to widen the camera field of view. The ports also added independent music volume controls and support of custom soundtracks. Capcom offered a free downloadable hip hop mixtape as an alternative soundtrack for the game.

In April 2012, Capcom announced the release of MvC2 for iOS devices. Capcom created two control configurations for iPhone and iPad touch screens. Players have a choice between the standard six-button layout, or a compact four-button control scheme with "flick controls". While the game does not support online play, a Versus Mode option is available over Bluetooth.

== Release ==
Marvel vs. Capcom 2: New Age of Heroes was released for Japanese arcades on the Sega NAOMI platform on March 23, 2000, followed by North America in May 2000. The game was soon released on the Dreamcast in Japan on March 30, 2000, followed by North America on June 29; the European version, released on July 16, was published by Virgin Interactive. MvC2 was ported to the PlayStation 2 on September 19, 2002, in Japan, November 19 in North America, and November 29 in Europe. The Xbox version launched alongside its PS2 counterpart in Japan on September 19, 2002, and later received a North American release on March 30, 2003. It was then released for the Xbox 360 via Xbox Live Arcade on July 29, 2009, and the PlayStation 3 via PlayStation Network on August 13. The PS3 version was also released physically with a code instead of a disc for a limited time through GameStop. Lastly, the game became available for iOS devices on April 25, 2012.

On December 15, 2013, Capcom announced that MvC2 would be removed from Xbox Live Arcade and PlayStation Network towards the end of the month, following the apparent expiration of Capcom's licensing contracts with Marvel Comics. The game was pulled from PSN on December 17 and 19 in North America and Europe, respectively, and from Xbox Live Arcade globally on December 26. Eventually, the iOS version was also delisted from the Apple App Store.

On August 2, 2021, prominent fighting game community member Maximilian Dood began a hashtag campaign to gather support for re-releases of Marvel vs. Capcom 2 onto modern consoles after it was delisted from digital platforms. The campaign led to #FREEMVC2 trending on Twitter and Mike Mika, the studio head for video game developer Digital Eclipse, expressing interest in re-releasing the game. On August 5, 2022, Arcade1Up revealed a Marvel vs. Capcom 2 arcade cabinet during the 2022 Evolution Championship Series. The cabinet includes Wi-Fi connectivity for online multiplayer, as well as several other Marvel crossover games developed by Capcom.

In June 2024, Capcom announced that Marvel vs. Capcom 2 would be among the games included in the Marvel vs. Capcom Fighting Collection: Arcade Classics compilation for Nintendo Switch, PlayStation 4, Xbox One, and Windows, which was released the following September, marking the first console re-release of the game since the Xbox 360 and PlayStation 3 versions were delisted.

== Reception ==
Reception

Aggregate scores
Aggregator	Score
GameRankings	SDC: 90% PS2: 76% Xbox: 67%
Metacritic	SDC: 90/100; PS2: 76/100; XBOX: 65/100; X360: 82/100; PS3: 85/100 iOS: 64/100

Review scores
Publication	Score
Destructoid	X360: 9/10
Eurogamer	PS2: 7/10
Famitsu	Xbox: 9/10, 7/10, 8/10, 8/10
GameRevolution	SDC: B+
GameSpot	SDC: 8.4/10
IGN	SDC: 9.3/10; PS2: 8.4/10; XBOX: 3.9/10
Next Generation	4/5
VideoGamer.com	X360: 9/10
TouchArcade	iOS: 3/5

Upon release, Marvel vs. Capcom 2: New Age of Heroes received critical acclaim for its frantic gameplay style, detailed backdrops and visuals, and enormous cast of playable characters. In Japan, Game Machine listed it as the most successful arcade game of April 2000. Anoop Gantayat of IGN praised the game for its refined battle system, despite its sheer level of insanity, labeling it as "one of the best fighting games out there". GameRevolution lauded the game for its character roster and crazy action, claiming that Capcom crafted an excellent sequel by combining "timeless gameplay, an ensemble cast, and hyper energy". The site also praised the graphics for creating a "2.5D graphical wonder that is candy for the eyes". Jeff Gerstmann of GameSpot praised the new control scheme and the addition of three-on-three combat; he concluded that fans of the previous games would be pleased with the changes made in MvC2.

The early Dreamcast, PS2, and Xbox versions of MvC2 were criticized for lacking online support outside Japan. Gerstmann commented that online multiplayer would have added much to the game's appeal. In his Xbox review, Aaron Boulding of IGN was particularly critical over its exclusion, citing Capcom's failure to deliver on its promise for Xbox Live support as the reason for his low score. Following the release of the PS3 and Xbox 360 ports, critics praised the game for providing a smooth online multiplayer experience. Topher Cantler of Destructoid praised the network performance, calling it "outstanding" and "flawless". Wesley Yin-Poole of VideoGamer.com stated that the addition of online play made the game "an essential purchase".

Across all platforms, many reviewers cited the jazz-inspired soundtrack as the game's biggest flaw. Jeremy Dunham of IGN described the music as "plain god-awful", stating that the "jazzy lounge lizard music and snappy beats" did not fit the action. Martin Taylor of Eurogamer expressed his disappointment that the game's visual flair was backed by "a horrific, lift music-oriented soundtrack and low quality sound effects". GameRevolution shared the sentiment, declaring it as "some of the lamest music that you've ever heard".

Reviewing the Dreamcast version, Blake Fischer of Next Generation wrote that "overall, this is the best 2D fighting experience available on a console. If you have a Dreamcast and can't wait for SF: Third Strike, this is the game to get." The game was a runner-up for GameSpot's annual "Best Fighting Game" award, which went to Capcom vs. SNK: Millennium Fight 2000.

Over the years since its release, MvC2 has repeatedly been included by various critics into their lists of the best fighting games ever, including ScrewAttack at GameTrailers in 2007, where it placed second, and Virgin Media.com in 2009, where it placed third. It was declared the best 2D fighting game by Complex in 2011 and 2013. In 2013, the game was also named as the most iconic Marvel video game by Nerdist. In 2010, GamePro also chose it as the 33rd best PS2 game of all time. The PS3 and Xbox 360 versions of the game sold 1.4 million units worldwide before their removal on December 15, 2013.

== Sequel ==
Following the release of Marvel vs. Capcom 2: New Age of Heroes, Capcom could not retain the Marvel Comics license due to legal issues over copyright, placing the series on indefinite hiatus. On April 20, 2010, 10 years after the game's original debut, Capcom announced the development of a sequel: Marvel vs. Capcom 3: Fate of Two Worlds. Production of MvC3 was headed by Ryota Niitsuma, who had previously worked with Capcom on Tatsunoko vs. Capcom. While it utilizes largely similar game mechanics to MvC2, the sequel features new methods of play designed for newcomers to the fighting game genre, such as the addition of a simplified three-button control scheme. MvC3 was released in February 2011 for the PS3 and Xbox 360.
