= List of Evolution Championship Series champions =

The following is a list of champions, along with runner-ups and semifinalists, within the Evolution Championship Series. For table compactness, only the top 4 are included. Tournaments held as side events are not included on the list. Additional details are available in the individual event articles by year.

== 2XKO ==
Year	Game	Top 4			
Year	Game	First	Second	Third	Fourth
2026 (Evo Japan)	2XKO	(United States) Jo'siah "HIKARI" Miller (Akali, Ahri)	(United States) Steve "Supernoon" Carbajal (Ekko, Teemo)	(France) Marwan "Wawa" Berthe (Vi, Caitlyn)	(United States) "bleed" (Ekko, Illaoi)
2026	2XKO	(United States) Jo'siah "HIKARI" Miller (Akali, Ahri)	(United States) Dominique "SonicFox" McLean (Jinx, Ahri) and Lenwood "INZEM" Arnold (Teemo, Thresh)	(United States) Steve "Supernoon" Carbajal (Ekko, Teemo)	(Japan) Shunsuke "poka" Abe (Akali, Ahri)
2026 (Evo France)	2XKO	(United States) "bleed" (Ekko, Illaoi)	(United States) Jo'siah "HIKARI" Miller (Akali, Ahri)	(United States) Dominique "SonicFox" McLean (Senna) and Lenwood "INZEM" Arnold (Teemo, Jinx)	(United States) Steve "Supernoon" Carbajal (Ekko, Akali)

== BlazBlue ==
Year	Game	Top 4			
Year	Game	First	Second	Third	Fourth
2011	BlazBlue: Continuum Shift II	(United States) Alex "Spark" Chen (Hakumen)	(United States) Steve "Lord Knight" Barthelemy (Litchi, Makoto)	(Japan) Hajime "Tokido" Taniguchi (Noel)	(United States) Kyle Bourne (Carl)
2014	BlazBlue: Chrono Phantasma	(Japan) Keiji "Galileo" Okamoto (Litchi)	(Japan) Ryo "Dogura" Nozaki (Azrael)	(Japan) Ryuji "DoraBang" Utsumi (Bang)	(Japan) Yoshiki Kouno (Nu)
2017	BlazBlue: Central Fiction	(Japan) Ryusei Ito (Carl)	(Japan) Shoji "Fenritti" Sho (Jin)	(Japan) Fumihiko "fumi" Yokobori (Nine)	(Japan) Tatsuro "Kaibutsukun" Fujiyoshi (Izanami, Nine)
2018 (Evo Japan)	BlazBlue: Central Fiction	(Japan) Shoji "Fenrich" Sho (Jin)	(Japan) "Yuta" (Es)	(Japan) "Sayakachan-Bot" (Es)	(Japan) "MokeMoke" (Relius)
2018	BlazBlue: Cross Tag Battle	(Japan) "Heiho" (Ruby, Gordeau)	(United States) Jeronte "Fame96" Latham (Yu, Jin)	(Japan) Ryuji "DoraBang" Utsumi (Hazama, Nu)	(Japan) Kazuyuki "KojiKOG" Koji (Tager, Waldstein)
2019 (Evo Japan)	BlazBlue: Cross Tag Battle	(Japan) Tomoyasu "Tomo/Relo" Nakata (Mai, Gordeau)	(Japan) "Alcormakkos" (Ruby, Gordeau)	(Japan) "Hide" (Ruby, Gordeau)	(Japan) "KYONOentremete" (Mitsuru, Yuzuriha)
2019	BlazBlue: Cross Tag Battle	(United States) Oscar "Shinku" Jaimes (Ruby, Yang)	(Japan) Kamei "Kyamei" Hiroyuki (Mitsuru, Akihiko)	(Japan) Seitaro "Domi" Ono (Akihiko, Yuzuriha)	(Japan) Kazuya "mekasue" Kamisue (Orie, Jubei)
2020 (Evo Japan)	BlazBlue: Cross Tag Battle	(Japan) Tsutomu "kubo" Kubota (Yumi, Seth)	(Japan) "DORA_BANG" (Naoto K., Merkava, Nu, Naoto S.)	(Japan) "nk_P" (Chie, Vatista)	(Japan) "Noble" (Carmine, Vatista, Heart, Akatsuki)
2026	BlazBlue: Central Fiction	(Japan) "Fukkuu" (Susanoo, Bang)	(Japan) Shoji "Fenrich" Sho (Jin)	(United States) Ryane "XCaliburBladez" Jimenez (Carl)	(Japan) "Rascal" (Bullet)

== Capcom vs. SNK ==
Year	Game	Top 4			
Year	Game	First	Second	Third	Fourth
2001 (B5)	Capcom vs. SNK	(Japan) "Chikyuu" (King, Sakura, Raiden)	(United States) Jason "xrolento" Nelson	(Canada) JFL	(United States) Ricki Ortiz
2002	Capcom vs. SNK 2	(Japan) Hajime "Tokido" Taniguchi (E. Honda, Blanka, Sagat)	(Japan) Shinya "Nuki" Ohnuki (Blanka, Chun-Li, Sagat, Ryu)	(United States) Armon "Ken" Jackson (Yun, Iori, Cammy)	(Japan) Tetsuya "Ino" Inoue (Cammy, Sagat, Blanka)
2003	Capcom vs. SNK 2	(Japan) Tetsuya "Ino" Inoue (Cammy, Sagat, Blanka)	(Japan) Daigo Umehara (Guile, Cammy, Sagat)	(Japan) Kenryo "Mago" Hayashi (E. Honda, Chun-Li, Blanka)	(Japan) Ryo "BAS" Yoshida (Blanka, Sakura, M. Bison)
2004	Capcom vs. SNK 2	(Japan) Yosuke "Kindevu" Ito (Sakura, M. Bison, Blanka)	(United States) Ricki Ortiz (Vega, Sakura, Blanka)	(United States) John Choi (Ken, Sagat, Guile)	(Japan) "Dan" (Ken, Ryu, Sagat)
2005	Capcom vs. SNK 2	(Japan) Ryo "BAS" Yoshida (Vega, M. Bison, Blanka, E. Honda)	(Japan) Kenryo "Mago" Hayashi (E. Honda, Sagat. Blanka)	(Japan) Yosuke "Kindevu" Ito (Sakura, M. Bison, Blanka)	(United States) Peter "Combofiend" Rosas (Akuma, Rolento, Eagle, Rock)
2006	Capcom vs. SNK 2	(Japan) Yosuke "Kindevu" Ito (Sakura, M. Bison, Blanka)	(United States) Ricki Ortiz (Vega, Sakura, Blanka)	(United States) Peter "Combofiend" Rosas (Ken, Sagat, Cammy)	(United States) Campbell "Buktooth" Tran (Hibiki, Morrigan, Iori)
2007	Capcom vs. SNK 2	(Japan) Ryo "BAS" Yoshida (Vega, Bison, Blanka)	(United States) Ricki Ortiz (Vega, Sakura, Blanka)	(United States) Justin Wong (Vega, Sakura, Blanka, Chun-Li, Sagat)	(Japan) Yosuke "Kindevu" Ito (Sakura, M. Bison, Blanka)
2008	Capcom vs. SNK 2	(United States) John Choi (Ken, Cammy, Sagat)	(Japan) Ryo "BAS" Yoshida (Vega, M. Bison, Blanka)	(United States) Ricki Ortiz (Vega, Sakura, Blanka)	(United States) Justin Wong (Vega, Cammy, Sagat)

== Darkstalkers ==
Year	Game	Top 4			
Year	Game	First	Second	Third	Fourth
2026 (Evo Japan)	Vampire Savior	(Japan) "Kaji" (Lilith)	(Japan) "Nakanishi" (Bishamon)	(Japan) "Kosyo" (B.B. Hood)	(Japan) "Komemaru" (Raptor)
2026	Vampire Savior	(Japan) "Kaji" (Lilith)	(Japan) "Nakanishi" (Bishamon)	(Japan) "Atsuta" (Hsien-Ko)	(Japan) "Decameron" (Raptor)

== Dragon Ball FighterZ ==
Year	Game	Top 4			
Year	Game	First	Second	Third	Fourth
2018	Dragon Ball FighterZ	(United States) Dominique "SonicFox" McLean (Bardock, Zamasu, Android 16)	(Japan) Goichi "GO1" Kishida (Cell, Bardock, Super Saiyan Vegeta)	(Japan) Shoji "Fenritti" Sho (Cell, Bardock, Super Saiyan Vegeta)	(Japan) Naoki "moke" Nakayama (Kid Buu, Cell, Trunks)
2019	Dragon Ball FighterZ	(Japan) Goichi "GO1" Kishida (Bardock, GT Goku, Super Saiyan Goku)	(United States) Dominique "SonicFox" McLean (Bardock, Kid Buu, GT Goku)	(Japan) Shoji "Fenritti" Sho (Cell, Bardock, Super Saiyan Vegeta)	(Spain) Joan "Shanks" Namay Millones (Android 18, Gohan, Super Saiyan Goku)
2022	Dragon Ball FighterZ	(France) Marwan "Wawa" Berthe (Super Saiyan Blue Gogeta, Vegito, Adult Gohan)	(United States) Shamar "Nitro" H. (Lab Coat Android 21, Super Saiyan Blue Goku, Android 21)	(France) Yonis "Yasha" Ahamada (Super Saiyan Blue Gogeta, Vegito, Android 17)	(France) Mohamed "Kayne" Sobti (Super Saiyan 4 Gogeta, Lab Coat Android 21, Tien)
2023	Dragon Ball FighterZ	(United States) Jo'siah "HIKARI" Miller (Super Saiyan Blue Gogeta, Vegito, Android 17)	(France) Yonis "Yasha" Ahamada (Super Saiyan Blue Gogeta, Vegito, Android 17)	(United States) Shamar "Nitro" Hinds (Gotenks, Gohan, Android 18)	(Spain) Daniel Gras "Gropis" Llopis (Baby, Frieza, Beerus)
2025 (EVO France)	Dragon Ball FighterZ	(United States) Jo'siah "HIKARI" Miller (Super Saiyan Blue Gogeta, Vegito, Android 17)	(Spain) Daniel Gras "Gropis" Llopis (Baby, Frieza, Beerus, Cell)	(France) Mael "WADE" Jomie (Baby, Kefla, Trunks)	(United Kingdom) "OBAssassin" (Hit, Teen Gohan, Trunks)

== Fatal Fury ==
Year	Game	Top 4			
Year	Game	First	Second	Third	Fourth
2025	Fatal Fury: City of the Wolves	(Japan) Goichi "GO1" Kishida (Kain, Marco)	(Taiwan) Lin "E.T." Chiahung (Hokutomaru, Billy)	(Japan) Shoji "Fenritti" Sho (Kain)	(South Korea) Chun-Gon "Poongko" Lee (Gato)
2025 (EVO France)	Fatal Fury: City of the Wolves	(China) Zheng "Xiaohai" Zhuojun (Hotaru)	(Japan) Yosuke "Kindevu" Ito (Kain)	(Saudi Arabia) "AbuOmar" (Dong-Hwan)	(Greece) Konstantinos "K-TOP" Lamprou (Kain)
2026 (Evo Japan)	Fatal Fury: City of the Wolves	(China) Zheng "Xiaohai" Zhuojun (Billy)	(Japan) "Laggia" (Gato)	(Taiwan) Tseng "ZJZ" Chiachen (Preecha)	(South Korea) Chun-Gon "Poongko" Lee (Gato)
2026	Fatal Fury: City of the Wolves	(China) Zheng "Xiaohai" Zhuojun (Mr. Karate, Billy)	(Japan) Kenta "mi2ha4" Ichihara (Rock)	(Japan) Shoji "Fenritti" Sho (Mr. Karate)	(Mexico) Daniel "Dany "El Maza"" Fuentes Garcia (Billy)
2026 (Evo France)	Fatal Fury: City of the Wolves	(Japan) Goichi "GO1" Kishida (Marco, Kenshiro)	(Japan) Kenta "mi2ha4" Ichihara (Rock)	(China) Zheng "Xiaohai" Zhuojun (Mr. Karate)	(China) Zheng "NaiWang" Yuqing (Krauser)

== Granblue Fantasy Versus ==
Year	Game	Top 4			
Year	Game	First	Second	Third	Fourth
2022	Granblue Fantasy Versus	(Japan) "Gamera" (Djeeta, Vira)	(Japan) "Tororo" (Percival)	(Japan) "Tako" (Belial)	(Japan) "Ren" (Charlotta, Avatar Belial, Seox)
2023 (Evo Japan)	Granblue Fantasy Versus	(Japan) "Gamera" (Katalina, Djeeta, Zooey)	(Japan) "Tororo" (Percival)	(Japan) "Emujima" (Belial)	(Japan) "Potaku" (Metera)
2024 (Evo Japan)	Granblue Fantasy Versus: Rising	(Japan) "Rookies" (Seox, Belial)	(Japan) "Gamera" (Djeeta)	(Japan) "Tororo" (Siegfried, Percival)	(Japan) "Ren" (Seox)
2024	Granblue Fantasy Versus: Rising	(United States) Aaron "Aarondamac" Godinez (Belial)	(Japan) "Tororo" (Percival)	(United States) "Kojicoco" (Nier)	(United States) Brian "Artorias" Huang (Siegfried)
2025 (Evo Japan)	Granblue Fantasy Versus: Rising	(Japan) "Kasausagi" (Ferry)	(Japan) "Zangief_Dream" (Cagliostro)	(Japan) "Shio" (Beelzebub)	(Japan) "Hinoki no Bou" (Narmaya)
2025	Granblue Fantasy Versus: Rising	(United States) Mathieu "Kojicoco" Fardet (Beatrix)	(United States) Brandon "Zane" Wanders (Grimnir)	(Japan) "Tororo" (Siegfried, Percival)	(Japan) Junichi "Fukunaga" Kumano (Versusia, Lancelot)
2025 (Evo France)	Granblue Fantasy Versus: Rising	(Spain) Lucy "Usagi" Aramburu (Grimnir)	(Italy) "Pixi" (Lowain)	(Netherlands) Alain "Space" Balemba (Beatrix, Cagliostro)	(Japan) "Gamera" (Beatrix, Cagliostro, Anila)
2026 (Evo Japan)	Granblue Fantasy Versus: Rising	(Japan) "Kasausagi" (Ferry)	(Japan) "Zangief_Dream" (Cagliostro, Vikala)	(Japan) "sho-san" (Zeta)	(Japan) "Gamera" (Meg, Ilsa)
2026	Granblue Fantasy Versus: Rising	(United States) Mathieu "Kojicoco" Fardet (Beatrix)	(Japan) "Shio" (Lowain)	(Japan) "Miraias" (Seox, Eustace)	(United States) Kyran "Monarch" Reives (Metera)
2026 (Evo France)	Granblue Fantasy Versus: Rising	(Japan) "Zangief_Dream" (Cagliostro)	(United States) Kyran "Monarch" Reives (Metera)	(Germany) "Socky" (Lowain, Seox, Charlotta)	(Netherlands) "Jessekumiko" (Lancelot)

== Guilty Gear ==
Year	Game	Top 4			
Year	Game	First	Second	Third	Fourth
2003	Guilty Gear X2	(Japan) Daigo Umehara (Sol)	(Japan) Soh "Miu" Miura (Sol)	(United Kingdom) Saif "ID" Ebrahim (Sol)	(Japan) Kenryo "Mago" Hayashi (Johnny)
2004	Guilty Gear X2	(Japan) Daigo Umehara (Sol)	(Japan) Yosuke "Kindevu" Ito (Eddie)	(Japan) Ryota "RF" Fukumoto (Faust)	(United States) Kevin "Kensou" Turner (Chipp, Eddie)
2005	Guilty Gear X2#Reload	(Japan) Ryota "RF" Fukumoto (Faust)	(Japan) Yosuke "Kindevu" Ito (Eddie)	(Japan) Soh "Miu" Miura (Sol)	(United States) Martin "Marn" Phan (Eddie, Bridget)
2006	Guilty Gear XX Slash (teams)	(Japan) Ryo “BAS” Yoshida/ (Japan) "Mint"/ (Japan) "Ruu"	(Japan) Daigo Umehara/ (Japan) Ryota "RF" Fukumoto/ (Japan) Yosuke "Kindevu" Ito	(United States) Alex "Mozanrath" Garvin/ (United States) Peter "Flash Metroid" Susini/ (United States) Chaz "Mynusdono" Frazer	(United States) Mike "Elvenshadow" Boczar/ (United States) David "Cue" Cue/ (United States) George "Juicy G"
2007	Guilty Gear XX Accent Core (teams)	(Japan) "Yossan"/ (Japan) "Gibson"	(United States) Peter "Flash Metroid" Susini/ (United States) Alex "Mozanrath" Garvin/ (United States) Martin "Marn" Phan	(Japan) Ryo “BAS” Yoshida/ (Japan) "Kami-chan"/ (Japan) "Mint"	(United States) Aaron "AKA" Harris/ (United States) George "Juicy G"/ (United States) John "BlackSnake" Prucha
2009	Guilty Gear XX Accent Core Plus	(Saudi Arabia) Abdullatif "Latif" Alhmili (Eddie)	(United States) Martin "Marn" Phan (Eddie, Jam)	(United States) Peter "Flash Metroid" Susini (May)	(United States) David "HellMonkey" Lardiere (Baiken)
2015	Guilty Gear Xrd -SIGN-	(Japan) Kenichi Ogawa (Zato)	(Japan) "Nage" (Faust)	(Japan) Ryuichi "Woshige" Shigeno (Millia)	(Japan) Takahiro "Nakamura" Kitano (Millia)
2016	Guilty Gear Xrd -REVELATOR-	(Japan) Masahiro "Machabo" Tominaga (Sin)	(Japan) Omito Hashimoto (Johnny)	(Japan) Hisatoshi "Rion" Usui (Ky)	(Japan) Takahiro "Nakamura" Kitano (Millia)
2017	Guilty Gear Xrd REV 2	(Japan) Omito Hashimoto (Johnny)	(Japan) "T5M7" (Leo)	(Japan) Kazuyoshi "Summit" Tezuka (Chipp)	(Japan) "Nage" (Faust)
2018 (Evo Japan)	Guilty Gear Xrd REV 2	(Japan) "Nage" (Faust)	(Japan) Omito "Omito" Hashimoto (Johnny)	(Japan) Ryota "Kazunoko" Inoue (Raven)	(Japan) "Ruki" (Dizzy)
2018	Guilty Gear Xrd REV 2	(Japan) Omito Hashimoto (Johnny)	(Japan) Masahiro "Machabo" Tominaga (Ky)	(United States) Eli "LostSoul" Rabadad (Elphelt)	(Japan) "Nage" (Faust)
2019 (Evo Japan)	Guilty Gear Xrd REV 2	(Japan) Kazuyoshi "Summit" Tezuka (Chipp)	(Japan) "Chachacha" (Haehyun)	(Japan) "Tomo" (Leo)	(Japan) Masahiro "Machabo" Tominaga (Ky, Sol)
2022	Guilty Gear Strive	(United States) Claire "UMISHO" Harrison (Chaos)	(Saudi Arabia) Molham "Slash" Qazili (May)	(Sweden) William "Leffen" Hjelte (Zato)	(United States) Julian "Hotashi" Harris (Nagoriyuki)
2023 (Evo Japan)	Guilty Gear Strive	(Japan) "GOBOU" (Zato)	(Japan) "Lox" (Giovanna)	(Japan) "umaaman" (Ramlethal, Baiken)	(South Korea) Kim "Daru_I-No" Jae-won (I-No)
2023	Guilty Gear Strive	(Sweden) William "Leffen" Hjelte (Chaos)	(United States) Johansson "NBNHMR" Mattias (Nagoriyuki)	(South Korea) Kim "Daru_I-No" Jae-won (I-No)	(United States) Claire "UMISHO" Harrison (Sol)
2024 (Evo Japan)	Guilty Gear Strive	(United States) Matthew "TempestNYC" Tulloch (Leo, Elphelt)	(South Korea) "sanakan" (Chaos)	(Japan) "Tyurara" (Ky, Sin, Bridget)	(Japan) "MiguMiguDokkoi" (Jack-O', Asuka)
2024	Guilty Gear Strive	(United States) Shamar "Nitro" Hinds (Jack-O', Giovanna)	(Japan) Yuya "tatuma" Fujiwara (Sol)	(United States) "RedDitto" (Ramlethal)	(Israel) Atir "Zando" Yosef (Asuka)
2025 (Evo Japan)	Guilty Gear Strive	(South Korea) Kim "Daru_I-No" Jae-won (I-No)	(United States) "RedDitto" (Ramlethal)	(Japan) Kazuyoshi "Summit" Tezuka (Chipp)	(United Kingdom) "Tiger_Pop" (Chaos, A.B.A)
2025	Guilty Gear Strive	(United States) "Kshuewhatdamoo" (Johnny)	(United States) "RedDitto" (Ramlethal)	(United States) "Aboii" (Potemkin)	(Japan) Yuya "tatuma" Fujiwara (Sol)
2025 (EVO France)	Guilty Gear Strive	(United Kingdom) "Tiger_Pop" (Chaos, A.B.A)	(France) "Patachu" (Sin)	(Spain) "Andross_11" (Potemkin)	(United States) Shamar "Nitro" Hinds (Leo)
2026 (Evo Japan)	Guilty Gear Strive	(Japan) "Tyurara" (Ky, Sin)	(South Korea) Kim "Daru_I-No" Jae-won (I-No)	(Japan) "surumaiden" (Asuka)	(Japan) "MikenBancho" (Bedman)
2026	Guilty Gear Strive	(United States) "RedDitto" (Ramlethal)	(Senegal) Ismaila "Verix" Gueye (Nagoriyuki)	(United States) Shamar "Nitro" Hinds (Leo)	(United States) Andre "Cheryo" Covington (Goldlewis)
2026 (Evo France)	Guilty Gear Strive	(United States) Shamar "Nitro" Hinds (Leo)	(Senegal) Ismaila "Verix" Gueye (Nagoriyuki)	(Spain) "Andross_11" (Potemkin, Leo)	(South Korea) Kim "Daru_I-No" Jae-won (I-No)

== Injustice ==
Year	Game	Top 4			
Year	Game	First	Second	Third	Fourth
2013	Injustice: Gods Among Us	(United States) Phillip "KDZ" Atkinson (Superman)	(United States) Denzell "DJT" Terry (Green Lantern, Doomsday)	(United States) Christopher "NYChrisG" Gonzalez (Green Arrow, Black Adam)	(United States) Frank "Slayer" Amaral (Superman, Wonder Woman)
2014	Injustice: Gods Among Us	(United States) Dominique "SonicFox" McLean (Batgirl)	(United States) Brant "Pig of the Hut" McCaskill (Zod)	(United States) Malik "MIT" Terry (Deathstroke, Batgirl, Aquaman)	(United States) Kyle Panlilio (Hawkgirl, Raven, Shazam)
2017	Injustice 2	(United States) Ryan "Dragon" Walker (Aquaman, Poison Ivy)	(Canada) Tim "HoneyBee" Commandeur (Flash, Aquaman)	(United States) Jivan "Theo" Karapetian (Superman)	(United States) Andrew "Semiij" Fontanez (Catwoman)
2018	Injustice 2	(United States) Curtis "Rewind" McCall (Catwoman, Black Adam, Blue Beetle, Firestorm)	(United States) "Tweedy" (Starfire, Doctor Fate)	(United States) Dominique "SonicFox" McLean (Starfire, Firestorm, Red Hood, Black Manta)	(United States) Ryan "Big D" DeDomenico (Poison Ivy)

== Killer Instinct ==
Year	Game	Top 4			
Year	Game	First	Second	Third	Fourth
2014	Killer Instinct	(United States) Emmanuel "CDJr" Brito (Sadira)	(United States) Jonathon "Rico Suave" Deleon (Thunder, Fulgore, Glacius, Jago, Sabrewulf)	(United States) Justin Wong (Sabrewulf)	(United States) Neilimen "GutterMagic" Alicea (Thunder)
2015	Killer Instinct	(United States) Jonathon "Rico Suave" Deleon (Thunder, Fulgore, Glacius, Omen, Spinal)	(United States) Neilimen "GutterMagic" Alicea (Thunder)	(United States) Darnell "Sleep" Waller (Kan-Ra)	(United States) Larry "LCD" Dent (Maya, Orchid, Hisako)
2016	Killer Instinct	(United States) Darnell "Hollywood Sleep" Waller (Arbiter, Gargos)	(United States) Kenneth "Bass" Armas (Spinal, Cinder, Jago)	(United States) Jamill "SeaDragon" Boykin (ARIA, Hisako)	(United States) Nicholas "Nicky" Iovene (Fulgore)

== The King of Fighters ==
Year	Game	Top 4			
Year	Game	First	Second	Third	Fourth
2012	The King of Fighters XIII	(South Korea) Lee "MadKOF" Kwang-no (Duo Lon, Chin, Kim)	(Mexico) Luis Armando "Bala" Velazquez (Billy, Takuma, Shen)	(South Korea) Shin "Verna" Min Su (EX Iori, Duo Lon, Kim)	(South Korea) "Guts" (EX Iori, Saiki, Vice)
2013	The King of Fighters XIII	(United States) Reynald "Reynald" Tacsuan (EX Kyo, Benimaru, Chin)	(Japan) Hee San Woo (Ryo, Takuma, Kim)	(South Korea) Lee "MadKOF" Kwang-no (King, Duo Lon, Kim)	(Japan) Hajime "Tokido" Taniguchi (EX Iori, Mr. Karate, Kim)
2014	The King of Fighters XIII	(China) Zeng "Xiaohai" Zhuojun (EX Iori, Mr. Karate, Kim)	(Japan) Hajime "Tokido" Taniguchi (EX Iori, Chin, Mr. Karate)	(Taiwan) Lin "E.T." Chiahung (Clark, Mr. Karate, EX Iori)	(South Korea) Lee "MadKOF" Kwang-no (Duo Lon, Daimon, Kim)
2017	The King of Fighters XIV	(Taiwan) Lin "E.T." Chiahung (Leona, Daimon, Benimaru)	(China) Zeng "Xiaohai" Zhuojun (Kula, Benimaru, Iori, Robert)	(Mexico) Luis "Luis Cha" Martinez (Mai, Andy, Mui Mui)	(Taiwan) Chia-Chen "ZJZ" Tseng (Yuri, Mature, Leona)
2018 (Evo Japan)	The King of Fighters XIV	(Taiwan) Chia-Chen "ZJZ" Tseng (Kula, Leona, Yuri, Mature, Robert)	(Hong Kong) Lau-yuk "Lau" Sing (Benimaru, Billy, Mature)	(Japan) Masanobu "M'" Murakami (Kula, Robert, Iori, Benimaru)	(China) Zeng "Xiaohai" Zhuojun (Kula, Benimaru, Iori)
2019 (Evo Japan)	The King of Fighters XIV	(Japan) Murakami "M'" Masanobu (Shun'ei, Billy, Iori)	(Taiwan) Lin "E.T." Chiahung (Choi, Blue Mary, Oswald, Billy)	(Japan) "Score" (Najd, Mature, Heidern)	(Japan) "SR" (Leona, Kim, Gang-il)
2022	The King of Fighters XV	(Taiwan) Chia-Chen "ZJZ" Tseng (Kula, B. Jenet, Krohnen)	(Taiwan) Lin "E.T." Chiahung (Kula, B. Jenet, Krohnen)	(Taiwan) Chen "XiaoHey" Sui Yang (Benimaru, Rock, Kyo)	(South Korea) Myung Gu "Lacid" Kang (Meitenkun, Shermie, Ash)
2023 (Evo Japan)	The King of Fighters XV	(China) Zeng "Xiaohai" Zhuojun (B. Jenet, Kyo, Krohnen)	(Taiwan) Chia-Chen "ZJZ" Tseng (B. Jenet, Nakoruru, Isla, Athena)	(South Korea) "LeShar" (K', Ryo, Krohnen)	(Japan) "Laggia" (Kyo, B. Jenet, Krohnen)
2023	The King of Fighters XV	(China) Zeng "Xiaohai" Zhuojun (Kyo, Isla, Krohnen, B. Jenet)	(Taiwan) Lin "E.T." Chiahung (Isla, B. Jenet, Krohnen)	(Japan) "mok" (B. Jenet, Luong, Kukri)	(Mexico) Agustín "Wero Asamiya" Escorcia (Kyo, B. Jenet, Iori)
2024 (Evo Japan)	The King of Fighters XV	(Taiwan) Lin "E.T." Chiahung (Clark, Geese, Isla)	(China) Zeng "Xiaohai" Zhuojun (Geese, Benimaru, Isla)	(Japan) Masanobu "M'" Murakami (Geese, Benimaru, Isla)	(South Korea) Kwang no "MadKOF" Lee (Geese, Heidern, Goenitz)
2024	The King of Fighters XV	(China) Zeng "Xiaohai" Zhuojun (Kyo, Benimaru, Isla, Geese)	(Taiwan) Lin "E.T." Chiahung (Geese, Benimaru, Isla, Heidern, Clark)	(Mexico) Ángel "Tamago" Chong (Blue Mary, Rock, Benimaru, Ryo)	(Mexico) "ViolentKain" (Ryo, Rock, Iori)
2025 (Evo Japan)	The King of Fighters XV	(Taiwan) Lin "E.T." Chiahung (Sylvie, Heidern, Isla, Meitenkun, Shermie, Ash, Clark, Athena)	(Japan) "mok" (Shun'ei, Isla, Kukri)	(South Korea) Myung gu "Lacid" Kang (Meitenkun, Shermie, Ash)	(Japan) Masanobu "M'" Murakami (Sylvie, Yashiro, Benimaru)
2026 (Evo Japan)	The King of Fighters XV	(Japan) Masanobu "M'" Murakami (Yashiro, Benimaru, Kula, Isla, Athena)	(South Korea) Myung Gu "Lacid" Kang (Meitenkun, Shermie, Ash)	(Peru) Gioseppe "TheGio" Parede (Blue Mary, Yuri, Isla)	(Hong Kong) "Pineapple" (Rugal, Ángel, Goenitz)

== Marvel vs. Capcom ==
Year	Game	Top 4			
Year	Game	First	Second	Third	Fourth
2000 (B4)	Marvel vs. Capcom 2: New Age of Heroes	(United States) Duc "Ducvader" Do	(United States) Alex "CaliPower" Valle	(United States) "Image"	(United States) Arturo "Sabin" Sanchez
2001 (B5)	Marvel vs. Capcom 2: New Age of Heroes	(United States) Justin Wong (Storm, Sentinel, Cammy)	(United States) Duc "Ducvader" Do (Spiral, Cable, Cyclops)	(United States) Jay "Viscant" Snyder (Storm, Sentinel, Doctor Doom)	(United States) Mike D (Storm, Cable, Cammy)
2002	Marvel vs. Capcom 2: New Age of Heroes	(United States) Justin Wong (Magneto, Cable, Sentinel)	(United States) Rodolfo "RowTron" Castro (Magneto, Cable, Sentinel)	(United States) Peter "ComboFiend" Rosas (Magneto, Iron Man, Sentinel)	(United States) Alex "Sin" Salguero (Cable, Sentinel, Captain Commando)
2003	Marvel vs. Capcom 2: New Age of Heroes	(United States) Justin Wong (Magneto, Cable, Sentinel)	(United States) Ricki Ortiz (Magneto, Storm, Psylocke, Sentinel, Captain Commando)	(United States) Rodolfo "RowTron" Castro (Sentinel, Magneto, Cable)	(United States) Jason "Kuaneazy" Kuan (Magneto, Cable, Sentinel)
2004	Marvel vs. Capcom 2: New Age of Heroes	(United States) Justin Wong (Sentinel, Storm, Captain Commando)	(United States) David Lee (Magneto, Cable, Sentinel)	(United States) Desmond "Xecutioner" Pinkney (Sentinel, Storm, Captain Commando)	(United States) Chris Schmidt (Magneto, Storm, Psylocke)
2005	Marvel vs. Capcom 2: New Age of Heroes	(United States) Duc "Ducvader" Do (Spiral, Cable, Sentinel)	(United States) Michael "Yipes" Mendoza (Magneto, Storm, Psylocke)	(United States) Peter "Potter" Avila (Storm, Sentinel, Cable)	(United States) Justin Wong (Magneto, Storm, Psylocke)
2006	Marvel vs. Capcom 2: New Age of Heroes	(United States) Justin Wong (Storm, Sentinel, Cyclops)	(United States) Alex "Chunksta" De Sousa (Magneto, Storm, Sentinel)	(United States) Nick "Reset" Cortese (Magneto, Storm, Psylocke)	(United States) Sooyoung "SooMighty" Chon (Magneto, Storm, Psylocke)
2007	Marvel vs. Capcom 2: New Age of Heroes	(United States) Michael "Yipes" Mendoza (Magneto, Storm, Psylocke)	(United States) Justin Wong (Storm, Cyclops, Sentinel)	(United States) Erik "Smoothviper" Arroyo (Cable, Sentinel, Captain Commando)	(United States) Chris Schmidt (Magneto, Storm, Sentinel)
2008	Marvel vs. Capcom 2: New Age of Heroes	(United States) Justin Wong (Sentinel, Storm, Captain Commando)	(United States) Alex "Chunksta" De Sousa (Magneto, Storm, Sentinel)	(United States) Erik "Smoothviper" Arroyo (Magneto, Cable, Sentinel)	(United States) Chris "Crizzle" Scott (Magneto, Storm, Psylocke)
2009	Marvel vs. Capcom 2: New Age of Heroes	(United States) Sanford Kelly (Storm, Sentinel, Captain Commando)	(United States) Justin Wong (Storm, Sentinel, Cyclops)	(United States) Michael "Yipes" Mendoza (Magneto, Storm, Cyclops)	(United States) Bill "Deus" Wellman (Storm, Sentinel, Captain Commando)
2010	Marvel vs. Capcom 2: New Age of Heroes	(United States) Justin Wong (Storm, Sentinel, Cyclops)	(United States) Sanford Kelly (Storm, Sentinel, Cable)	(United States) Daniel "ClockwOrk" Maniago (Strider, Sentinel, Doctor Doom)	(United States) Michael "Yipes" Mendoza (Storm, Magneto, Cyclops)
2011	Marvel vs. Capcom 3: Fate of Two Worlds	(United States) Jay "Viscant" Snyder (Wesker, Haggar, Phoenix)	(United States) Eduardo "PR Balrog" Pérez-Frangie (Dante, Wolverine, Tron)	(United States) Justin Wong (She-Hulk, Wolverine, Akuma, Storm, Wesker)	(United States) Peter "ComboFiend" Rosas (She-Hulk, Taskmaster, Spencer)
2012	Ultimate Marvel vs. Capcom 3	(United States) Ryan "Filipino Champ" Ramirez (Magneto, Dormammu, Doctor Doom, Phoenix)	(United States) Carlos "Infrit" Randay (Nova, Spencer, Sentinel)	(United States) Christopher "NYChrisG" Gonzalez (Akuma, Doctor Doom, Morrigan, Hawkeye, Ryu, Wesker)	(United States) Peter "ComboFiend" Rosas (Nova, Spencer, Hawkeye, She-Hulk, Taskmaster)
2013	Ultimate Marvel vs. Capcom 3	(United States) Job "Flocker" Figueroa (Zero, Vergil, Hawkeye)	(United States) Justin Wong (Wolverine, Storm, Akuma)	(United States) Armando "Angelic" Mejia (Wolverine, Dormammu, Shuma-Gorath)	(United States) Jonathan "Cloud805" Morales (Zero, Vergil, Dante)
2014	Ultimate Marvel vs. Capcom 3	(United States) Justin Wong (Wolverine, Storm, Akuma)	(United States) Christopher "NYChrisG" Gonzalez (Morrigan, Doctor Doom, Vergil)	(United States) Ryan "Filipino Champ" Ramirez (Magneto, Doctor Doom, Phoenix)	(United States) Raynel "RayRay" Hidalgo (Magneto, Doctor Doom, Sentinel)
2015	Ultimate Marvel vs. Capcom 3	(Chile) Nicolás "KaneBlueRiver" González (Hulk, Sentinel, Haggar)	(United States) Raynel "RayRay" Hidalgo (Magneto, Doctor Doom, Sentinel)	(United States) Vineeth "ApologyMan" Meka (Firebrand, Doctor Doom, Super-Skrull)	(Mexico) César "Frutsy" Garcia (M.O.D.O.K, Captain America, Doctor Doom)
2016	Ultimate Marvel vs. Capcom 3	(United States) Christopher "NYChrisG" Gonzalez (Morrigan, Doctor Doom, Vergil)	(Chile) Nicolás "KaneBlueRiver" González (Hulk, Sentinel, Haggar)	(United States) Armando "Angelic" Mejia (Wolverine, Dormammu, Shuma-Gorath)	(United States) Kevin "Dual Kevin" Barrios (Deadpool, Dante, Hawkeye)
2017	Ultimate Marvel vs. Capcom 3	(United States) Rene "RyanLV" Romero (Morrigan, Phoenix, Chun-Li)	(United States) Christopher "NYChrisG" Gonzalez (Vergil, Doctor Doom, Morrigan)	(Canada) Jose "Quackbot" Aldape (Doctor Doom, Phoenix, Magneto)	(United States) Luis "Paradigm" Cervantes (Doctor Doom, Haggar, Rocket)
2023	Ultimate Marvel vs. Capcom 3	(United States) Gabriel "Jibrill" Lam (Zero, Dante, Vergil)	(United States) Matthew "Evasion" Skuce (Zero, Dante, Vergil)	(Chile) Nicolás "KaneBlueRiver" González (Hulk, Sentinel, Haggar)	(United States) Adrian "LiberalTerminator" Cordova (Nova, Spencer, Doctor Doom)
2025	Marvel vs. Capcom 2: New Age of Heroes	(United States) Ken "Khaos" Villalobos (Sentinel, Storm, Cyclops, Magneto)	(United States) "VIGGA" (Magneto, Storm, Psylocke)	(United States) "Servbot" (Magneto, Storm, Psylocke)	(United States) Peter "ComboFiend" Rosas (Sentinel, Magneto, Iron Man)

== Melty Blood ==
Year	Game	Top 4			
Year	Game	First	Second	Third	Fourth
2010	Melty Blood: Actress Again	(Japan) Yoichiro "Garu" Aruga (Kohaku, Sion)	(United States) Stephen "Lord Knight" Barthelemy (Kohaku)	(Mexico) Antonio "Kusanagi" Medrano (Aoko)	(United States) Byron "HF Blade" Barzabal (Ciel)
2022	Melty Blood: Type Lumina	(Japan) "Jing" (Hisui)	(United States) Damian "Masoma" Fullbright (Vlov)	(United States) "Kiri" (Noel)	(Costa Rica) Jose "ScrawtVermillion" Ballestero (Mario)
2023 (Evo Japan)	Melty Blood: Type Lumina	(Japan) "Kjiro" (Noel)	(Japan) "Yuika" (Roa)	(Japan) "mateokk" (Aoko)	(Japan) "Jing" (Hisui)
2023	Melty Blood: Type Lumina	(Japan) "Moai" (Roa)	(Japan) "DAI" (Roa)	(United States) Jimmy "jimmyjtran" Tran (Ciel)	(Japan) "Jing" (Hisui)
2026 (Evo Japan)	Melty Blood: Type Lumina	(Japan) "Yutta" (Hisui, Mario)	(Japan) "Moai" (Roa, Mario)	(Japan) "Teal" (Akiha)	(Costa Rica) Jose "ScrawtVermillion" Ballestero (Kouma)

== Mortal Kombat ==
Year	Game	Top 4			
Year	Game	First	Second	Third	Fourth
2011	Mortal Kombat 9	(United States) Carl "Perfect Legend" White (Kung Lao)	(United States) Giuseppe "REO" Grosso (Mileena, Cyrax)	(United States) Eric "JOP" Akins (Johnny Cage, Raiden)	(United States) Christian Gonzalez (Reptile)
2012	Mortal Kombat 9	(United States) Carl "Perfect Legend" White (Kung Lao)	(United States) Emmanuel "CDjr" Brito (Kabal, Jax, Rain)	(United States) Brant "Pig of the Hut" McCaskill (Kenshi, Mileena)	(United States) Malik "MIT" Terry (Johnny Cage, Reptile, Scorpion, Stryker)
2013	Mortal Kombat 9	(United States) Denzell "Crazy DJT 88" Terry (Cyrax)	(United States) Giuseppe "REO" Grosso (Kabal)	(United States) Lenin "MyGod" Castillo (Sonya, Liu Kang)	(United States) Christian "Forever King" Quiles (Kung Lao)
2015	Mortal Kombat X	(United States) Dominique "SonicFox" McLean (Erron, Kitana)	(United Kingdom) Denom "A F0xy Grampa" Jones (Kung Lao)	(Canada) Tim "HoneyBee" Commandeur (D'Vorah)	(United States) Malik "MIT" Terry (Tanya, Sonya)
2016	Mortal Kombat XL	(United States) Dominique "SonicFox" McLean (Erron, Cassie Cage, Alien, Jason)	(Bahrain) Sayed "Tekken Master" Hashim Ahmed (Kotal Kahn, D'Vorah)	(United States) Brad "Scar" Vaughn (Sonya)	(United States) Ryan "Big D" Dedomenico (Ermac)
2019	Mortal Kombat 11	(United States) Dominique "SonicFox" McLean (Cassie Cage)	(United States) Ryan "Dragon" Walker (Cetrion)	(Bahrain) Sayed "Tekken Master" Hashim Ahmed (Geras, Erron, Kung Lao, Sonya)	(United States) Julien "Deoxys" Gorena (Geras)
2022	Mortal Kombat 11 Ultimate	(Chile) Matías "Scorpionprocs" Martínez (Fujin, Kabal, Kung Lao, Liu Kang)	(United States) Curtis "Rewind" McCall (Kano, Kotal Kahn, Liu Kang)	(Chile) Nicolás "Nicolas" Martínez (Kabal, Fujin, Kung Lao)	(United Kingdom) Denom "A F0xy Grampa" Jones (RoboCop, Nightwolf, Kitana)
2023	Mortal Kombat 11 Ultimate	(United States) Jarrad "Ninjakilla_212" Gooden (Fujin)	(Chile) Nicolás "Nicolas" Martínez (Fujin, Johnny Cage)	(Chile) Matías "Scorpionprocs" Martínez (Fujin, Johnny Cage)	(United Kingdom) Denom "A F0xy Grampa" Jones (Terminator, RoboCop, Sub-Zero, Kitana)
2024	Mortal Kombat 1	(United States) Dominique "SonicFox" McLean (Homelander, Sindel, Johnny Cage)	(Chile) Nicolás "Nicolas" Martínez (Johnny Cage, Baraka, Rain)	(Brazil) Pedro "Zeeus" Ribeiro (Ashrah)	(United States) Daniel "TheMightyUnjust" Taibot (Homelander, Ermac)
2025	Mortal Kombat 1	(United States) Dominique "SonicFox" McLean (Cyrax)	(Chile) Nicolás "Nicolas" Martínez (Havik, Reiko, Baraka, Homelander)	(Turkey) Mustafa "Kanimani" Bicici (Johnny Cage, Sindel, Homelander)	(United States) "Hourglass Of Rain" (Mileena)

== Persona 4 Arena ==
Year	Game	Top 4			
Year	Game	First	Second	Third	Fourth
2013	Persona 4 Arena	(Japan) "Yume" (Aigis)	(United States) Steve "Lord Knight" Barthelemy (Mitsuru)	(United States) Jose Rafael "BananaKen" Llera (Shadow Labrys)	(United States) Eddie "brkrdave" Sayles (Teddie)
2015	Persona 4 Arena Ultimax	(Japan) "Chou" (Ken)	(Japan) “Tahichi” (Margaret, Yukari)	(Japan) “Hagiwara” (Teddie)	(Japan) “Aguro” (Yu)

== Samurai Shodown ==
Year	Game	Top 4			
Year	Game	First	Second	Third	Fourth
2019	Samurai Shodown	(South Korea) Lee "Infiltration" Seon-woo (Genjuro)	(Japan) Ryota "Kazunoko" Inoue (Haohmaru)	(United States) Justin Wong (Tam Tam)	(United States) "Reynald" Tacsuan (Genjuro, Haohmaru)
2020 (Evo Japan)	Samurai Shodown	(Japan) "Gamera" (Shiki)	(Japan) Emujima (Shizumaru)	(Japan) "Score" (Haohmaru)	(Japan) "Hishow" (Shizumaru, Charlotte)

== Soulcalibur ==
Year	Game	Top 4			
Year	Game	First	Second	Third	Fourth
2003	Soulcalibur II	(France) Daniel "The Nightmare" Vu	(United States) Will "Semi" Johnson	(United States) Ari "fLoE" Weintraub	(United States) Aris Bakhtanians
2004	Soulcalibur II	(United States) Robert "RTD" Combs	(United States) Marquette "Mick" Yarbrough	(Canada) Mystic "SowNemesis" Senior	(United States) Christian Gonzalez
2009	Soulcalibur IV	(France) Jonathan "Malek" Ledy	(United States) Phillip "KDZ" Atkinson	(United States) Joseph "Omega" Freire	(United States) "Alpha Male"
2012	Soulcalibur V	(Japan) Naoaki "Shining Decopon" Yanagihara (Tira)	(Singapore) Shen Chan (Cervantes)	(United States) Omar "Something-Unique" Mohammed (Pyrrah)	(United States) Jonathan "Woahhzz" Vo (Patroklos Alpha)
2019 (Evo Japan)	Soulcalibur VI	(France) Kevin "Keev" Akre (Nightmare)	(Singapore) Jovian "Shen Chan" Chan (Cervantes)	(Japan) "SHK" (Zasalamel)	(Singapore) Raymus Chang "Shen Yuan" Jian Yuan (Siegfried, Sophitia)
2019	Soulcalibur VI	(Japan) "Yuttoto" (Voldo)	(United States) Zain "Bluegod" T. (Azwel)	(France) Jérémy "Skyll" Bernard (Mitsurugi)	(Singapore) Jonathan "Woahhzz" Vo (Raphael)
2020 (Evo Japan)	Soulcalibur VI	(United States) Zain "Bluegod" T. (Azwel)	(Japan) "Yuttoto" (Voldo, Zasalamel, Raphael, Azwel)	(United States) Nathan "linkorz" Mandell (Geralt, Siegfried)	(Singapore) Jovian "Shen Chan" Chan (Tira)

== Street Fighter ==
Year	Game	Top 4			
Year	Game	First	Second	Third	Fourth
1996 (B3)	Super Street Fighter II Turbo	(United States) Graham "GWolfe" Wolfe	(United States) Jason "xrolento" Nelson	(United States) Mike "Watts" Watson	(United States) Alex Valle
1996 (B3)	Street Fighter Alpha 2	(United States) Alex Valle (Ken, Ryu, Sagat)	(United States) John Choi (Ken)	(United States) Jason "xrolento" Nelson (Charlie, Ken, Sagat)	(United States) Jeff Schaefer (Akuma, Ken)
2000 (B4)	Super Street Fighter II Turbo	(United States) Mike "Watts" Watson (Balrog, M. Bison, Ryu)	(United States) Alex Valle (Ryu, Sagat)	(United States) John Choi (Ryu, Sagat)	(United States) Jason "Shirts" DeHeras (Dhalsim)
2000 (B4)	Street Fighter III: 3rd Strike	(United States) Alex Valle (Chun-Li, Ryu)	(United States) Hsien Chang (Akuma, Yang)	(United States) John Choi (Ryu)	(United States) Eddie Lee (Chun-Li, Ibuki)
2000 (B4)	Street Fighter Alpha 2	(United States) Alex Valle	(United States) John Choi	(United States) Thao Duong	(United States) Jason "DreamTR" Wilson
2000 (B4)	Street Fighter Alpha 3	(United States) John Choi (Sakura)	(United States) Alex Valle (Akuma, Sakura, Rolento)	(United States) Thao Duong (Nash, Dhalsim)	(United States) Eddie Lee (Karin, Sodom, Vega)
2001 (B5)	Super Street Fighter II Turbo	(United States) Jason "AfroCole" Cole (Dhalsim)	(United States) John Choi (Sagat, Ryu)	(United States) Alex Valle (Ryu)	(United States) Mike "Watts" Watson (Ryu, Balrog, Vega)
2001 (B5)	Street Fighter Alpha 3	(Japan) Ryo "BAS" Yoshida (Akuma, Cody)	(Japan) "Chikyuu" (Rolento, Sodom, R. Mika)	(United States) John Choi (Sakura)	(United States) Mike "Watts" Watson (Akuma)
2002	Super Street Fighter II Turbo	(United States) Jason Cole (Dhalsim)	(Japan) Shinya "Nuki" Ohnuki (Chun-Li)	(United States) Jason "Shirts" DeHeras (Dhalsim)	(United States) Jason "Apoc" McGlone (Vega)
2003	Street Fighter III: 3rd Strike	(Japan) Kenji "KO" Obata (Yun)	(Japan) Daigo Umehara (Ken)	(Japan) Keisuke "KSK" Imai (Alex)	(Japan) Tetsuya "Ino" Inoue (Makoto)
2003	Super Street Fighter II Turbo	(Japan) Daigo Umehara (Ryu)	(Japan) Shinya "Nuki" Ohnuki (Chun-Li)	(United States) John Choi (Sagat)	(United States) Mike Watson (Balrog, Ryu)
2004	Street Fighter III: 3rd Strike	(Japan) Kenji "KO" Obata (Yun)	(Japan) Daigo Umehara (Ken)	(United States) Justin Wong (Chun-Li)	(Japan) Toru "Raoh" Hashimoto (Chun-Li)
2004	Super Street Fighter II Turbo	(Japan) Daigo Umehara (Sagat, Ryu, Balrog)	(United States) John Choi (Sagat, Guile)	(Japan) Kuni Funada (Zangief)	(United States) Justin Wong (Sagat, Chun-Li)
2005	Street Fighter III: 3rd Strike	(Japan) Shinya "Nuki" Ohnuki (Chun-Li)	(United States) Justin Wong (Chun-Li)	(Japan) Yoshihiko "Nitto" Togawa (Yun)	(Japan) Masahito "Mester" Tsuji (Yun)
2005	Super Street Fighter II Turbo	(Japan) "Gian" (Dhalsim)	(Japan) Shinya "Nuki" Ohnuki (Chun-Li)	(Japan) Hajime "Tokido" Taniguchi (Chun-Li)	(United States) Phillip "DarksydePhil" Burnell (Dee Jay, Chun-Li)
2006	Street Fighter III: 3rd Strike	(Japan) Yoshihiko "Nitto" Togawa (Yun)	(Japan) Issei Suzuki (Yun)	(Japan) Shinya "Nuki" Ohnuki (Chun-Li)	(Japan) Masahito Tsuji (Yun)
2006	Hyper Street Fighter II	(United States) Alex Wolfe (Dhalsim, M. Bison)	(United States) Jason Nelson (Ryu, M. Bison, Sagat, Guile)	(Japan) Hajime "Tokido" Taniguchi (M. Bison)	(United States) Alex Valle (Sagat, Ryu)
2007	Street Fighter III: 3rd Strike	(Japan) Shinya "Nuki" Ohnuki (Chun-Li)	(Japan) Hajime "Tokido" Taniguchi (Chun-Li)	(United States) Alex Valle (Ken, Ryu)	(United States) Mike Wakefield (Makoto)
2007	Super Street Fighter II Turbo	(Japan) Hajime "Tokido" Taniguchi (Vega)	(United States) John "Choiboy" Choi (Ryu, Sagat)	(United States) Graham Wolfe (Balrog, Vega)	(United States) Quoc Hung "AfroLegends" Nguyen (Dee Jay, Balrog)
2008	Street Fighter III: 3rd Strike	(Japan) Shinya "Nuki" Ohnuki (Chun-Li)	(United States) Justin Wong (Chun-Li)	(United States) Amir Amirsaleh (Chun-Li)	(Japan) Hajime "Tokido" Taniguchi (Chun-Li)
2008	Super Street Fighter II Turbo	(United States) John "Choiboy" Choi (Ryu, Sagat)	(Japan) Shinya "Nuki" Ohnuki (Chun-LI)	(United States) Alex Valle (Ryu, Ken)	(Japan) Hajime "Tokido" Taniguchi (Vega)
2009	Street Fighter III: 3rd Strike (2v2)	(United States) Justin Wong (Chun-Li) and (Japan) Issei Suzuki (Yun)	(United States) Jimmy "Jimmyjtran" Tran (Urien) and "Rommel" (Yang)	(United States) Ryan "Fubarduck" Harvey (Chun-Li) and Mark "mopreme" Rogoyski (Ryu)	(United States) Alex Valle (Ken) and J.R. Rodriguez (Akuma)
2009	Super Street Fighter II Turbo HD Remix	(United States) Hung "AfroLegends" Nguyen (Balrog, Dee Jay)	(United States) John "Choiboy" Choi (Ryu)	(United States) Damien "Damdai" Dailidenas (Ken, Zangief)	(United States) Graham Wolfe (Balrog)
2009	Street Fighter IV	(Japan) Daigo Umehara (Ryu)	(United States) Justin Wong (Rufus, Balrog, Abel)	(United States) Ed Ma (Akuma, Zangief)	(United States) Sanford Kelly (Akuma, Cammy)
2010	Super Street Fighter IV	(Japan) Daigo Umehara (Ryu)	(United States) Ricki Ortiz (Rufus, Chun-Li)	(South Korea) Seon-Woo "Infiltration" Lee (Akuma)	(United States) Mike Ross (E. Honda)
2010	Super Street Fighter IV (women)	(France) Marie-Laure "Kayane" Norindr (Chun-Li)	(United States) Sola "BurnYourBra" Adesiji (Ken, Gouken, Rose)	(United States) Phuong "Yellow Gal" Le (Chun-Li)	(United States) Lina Yu (Blanka)
2010	Super Street Fighter II Turbo HD Remix	(United States) Darryl "Snake Eyez" Lewis (Zangief)	(United States) "DGV" (Ryu)	(Japan) Daigo Umehara (Balrog, Ryu)	(United States) Quoc Hung "AfroLegends" Nguyen (Balrog, Dee Jay)
2011	Super Street Fighter IV: Arcade Edition	(Japan) Keita "Fuudo" Ai (Fei Long)	(Saudi Arabia) Abdullatif "Latif" Alhmili (C. Viper)	(South Korea) Chung-gon "Poongko" Lee (Seth)	(Japan) Daigo Umehara (Yun)
2012	Super Street Fighter IV: Arcade Edition (Version 2012)	(South Korea) Seon-woo "Infiltration" Lee (Akuma, Gouken)	(Taiwan) Bruce "GamerBee" Hsiang (Adon)	(United States) Eduardo "PRBalrog" Pérez-Frangie (Balrog)	(China) Zhuojun "Xiaohai" Zeng (Cammy)
2013	Super Street Fighter IV: Arcade Edition (Version 2012)	(Singapore) Kun Xian Ho (Gen)	(Japan) Hajime "Tokido" Taniguchi (Akuma)	(South Korea) Seon-Woo "Infiltration" Lee (Akuma, Hakan)	(United States) Eduardo "PRBalrog" Pérez-Frangie (Balrog, Fei Long)
2014	Ultra Street Fighter IV	(France) Olivier "Luffy" Hay (Rose)	(Japan) Masato "Bonchan" Takahashi (Sagat)	(Japan) Keita "Fuudo" Ai (Fei Long)	(United States) Darryl "Snake Eyez" Lewis (Zangief)
2015	Ultra Street Fighter IV	(Japan) Yusuke Momochi (Ken, Evil Ryu, Elena)	(Taiwan) Bruce "GamerBee" Hsiang (Elena, Adon)	(South Korea) Seon-woo "Infiltration" Lee (Evil Ryu, Chun-Li, Abel, Decapre, Elena, Juri)	(Japan) Naoki "Nemo" Nemoto (Rolento)
2016	Street Fighter V	(South Korea) Seon-woo "Infiltration" Lee (Nash)	(Japan) Keita "Fuudo" Ai (R. Mika)	(Japan) Atsushi "yukadon" Fujimura (Nash)	(Japan) Goichi "GO1" Kishida (Chun-Li)
2017	Street Fighter V	(Japan) Hajime "Tokido" Taniguchi (Akuma)	(United States) Victor "Punk" Woodley (Karin, Nash)	(Japan) Ryota "Kazunoko" Inoue (Cammy)	(Japan) Hiromiki "Itabashi Zangief" Kumada (Zangief)
2018 (Evo Japan)	Street Fighter V: Arcade Edition	(South Korea) Seon-woo "Infiltration" Lee (Menat, Juri)	(Japan) Ryota "John Takeuchi" Takeuchi (Rashid)	(Japan) Daigo Umehara (Guile)	(Japan) Hajime "Tokido" Taniguchi (Akuma)
2018	Street Fighter V: Arcade Edition	(United Kingdom) Benjamin "Problem X" Simon (M. Bison, Abigail)	(Japan) Hajime "Tokido" Taniguchi (Akuma)	(Japan) Keita "Fuudo" Ai (R. Mika)	(Japan) Tsunehiro "gachikun" Kanamori (Rashid)
2019 (Evo Japan)	Street Fighter V: Arcade Edition	(Japan) Yusuke Momochi (Kolin, Zeku)	(Japan) Keita "Fuudo" Ai (R. Mika, Birdie)	(Japan) "Powell" (Cammy)	(United States) Victor "Punk" Woodley (Karin, Nash)
2019	Street Fighter V: Arcade Edition	(Japan) Masato "Bonchan" Takahashi (Karin, Sagat)	(United Arab Emirates) Adel "Big Bird" Anouche (Rashid)	(United Kingdom) DC "Infexious" Coleman (Zeku)	(Japan) Atsushi Fujimura (Ibuki)
2020 (Evo Japan)	Street Fighter V: Arcade Edition	(Japan) Sato "Nauman" Ryo (Sakura)	(Japan) Kenryo "Mago" Hayashi (Cammy, Karin)	(Japan) "sako" (Menat, Kage)	(United States) Du "NuckleDu" Dang (G, R. Mika, Cammy, Guile)
2022	Street Fighter V: Champion Edition	(Japan) Masaki Kawano (Kolin)	(United States) Derek "iDom" Ruffin (Laura, Poison)	(Japan) Tsunehiro "gachikun" Kanamori (Rashid)	(Japan) Hajime "Tokido" Taniguchi (Luke, Urien)
2023 (Evo Japan)	Street Fighter V: Champion Edition	(Taiwan) Li-Wei "Oil King" Lin (Seth, Rashid)	(Japan) Nemoto "Nemo" Naoki (Gill, Urien, Falke)	(Japan) Masahiro "Machabo" Tominaga (Necalli)	(Japan) Yusuke "Momochi" Momochi (Cody)
2023	Street Fighter 6	(United Arab Emirates) Amjad "AngryBird" Al-Shalabi (Ken)	(Dominican Republic) Saul "MenaRD" Mena II (Blanka, Luke)	(United States) Victor "Punk" Woodley (Cammy)	(Japan) Hajime "Tokido" Taniguchi (Ken)
2024 (Evo Japan)	Street Fighter III: 3rd Strike	(Japan) "SHO" (Yun)	(Japan) "Boss" (Yun)	(Japan) "Muteki Gollila" (Chun-Li)	(Japan) "Ucc" (Yun)
2024 (Evo Japan)	Street Fighter 6	(Dominican Republic) Saul "MenaRD" Mena II (Blanka, Luke)	(Japan) Kakeru Watanabe (JP)	(United States) Alexander "Lexx" Bautista (Guile)	(Japan) "Ryukichi" (Ken)
2024	Street Fighter III: 3rd Strike	(Japan) Joe "MOV" Egami (Chun-Li, Elena, Ken)	(Japan) Issei Suzuki (Yun)	(Canada) Henri "Chi-Rithy" Oung (Chun-Li)	(Japan) Ryuji "Hayao" Hayashi (Hugo)
2024	Street Fighter 6	(United States) Victor "Punk" Woodley (Cammy)	(United Arab Emirates) Adel "Big Bird" Anouche (Rashid)	(United Kingdom) "EndingWalker" (Ed)	(Japan) Yusuke Momochi (Ed)
2025 (Evo Japan)	Street Fighter 6	(Dominican Republic) Saul "MenaRD" Mena II (Blanka, M. Bison, Zangief)	(Japan) "Ryukichi" (Ken)	(Japan) "Kobayan" (Zangief)	(Japan) Yusuke Momochi (Ed, Mai)
2025	Street Fighter 6	(Dominican Republic) Saul "MenaRD" Mena II (Blanka, M. Bison)	(Japan) Kakeru Watanabe (JP)	(Hong Kong) "Micky" (Cammy, Mai)	(Norway) Arman "Phenom" Hanjani (Cammy)
2025 (EVO France)	Street Fighter 6	(South Korea) "LeShar" (Ed, Elena, Terry)	(Chile) Derek Blaz (Ryu, Ken, Sagat)	(Japan) "Kobayan" (Zangief)	(France) Nathan "Mister Crimson" Massol (Dhalsim)
2026 (Evo Japan)	Street Fighter 6	(Japan) Eisuke Yamaguchi (Mai)	(United States) Victor "Punk" Woodley (Cammy)	(Japan) Kojiro Higuchi (Guile)	(Taiwan) Lin "Hope" Junxi (A.K.I. [Modern])
2026	Street Fighter 6	(Dominican Republic) Saul "MenaRD" Mena II (Blanka, M. Bison)	(Japan) "Shigematsu" (Blanka)	(France) Kilyan "Kilzyou" Faucheux (Mai, Juri)	(Chile) Jaime "Craime" Bustos (Ryu, M. Bison)
2026 (Evo France)	Street Fighter 6	(United States) Kevin "Dual Kevin" Barrios (Rashid)	(Japan) Toru Tachikawa (C. Viper)	(United States) Victor "Punk" Woodley (Cammy)	(Japan) "Kobayan" (Zangief)

== Street Fighter X Tekken ==
Year	Game	Top 4			
Year	Game	First	Second	Third	Fourth
2012	Street Fighter X Tekken (2v2)	(South Korea) Seon-Woo "Infiltration" Lee (Rolento) and Ryan "Laugh" Ahn (Ryu)	(United States) Ricki Ortiz (Rufus) and Eduardo "PR Balrog" Pérez (Ryu)	(Japan) Hajime "Tokido" Taniguchi (Chun-Li) and Keita "Fuudo" Ai (Ryu)	(United States) Mike Ross (Marduk), and Peter "Combofiend" Rosas (Julia)
2013	Street Fighter X Tekken (Version 2013)	(South Korea) Seon-Woo "Infiltration" Lee (Jin, Alisa)	(United States) Justin Wong (Hwoarang, Chun-Li)	(Japan) Joe "MOV" Egami (Law, Nina, Cammy)	(United States) Alex Valle (Yoshimitsu, Lars)

== Super Smash Bros. ==
Year	Game	Top 4			
Year	Game	First	Second	Third	Fourth
2007	Super Smash Bros. Melee	(United States) Ken Hoang (Marth)	(United States) Hugo "HugS" Gonzalez (Samus)	(United States) Joseph "Mango" Marquez (Jigglypuff)	(United States) Christopher "PC Chris" Szygiel (Falco, Fox, Peach)
2008	Super Smash Bros. Brawl	(United States) Asim "CPU" Mehta (R.O.B.)	(United States) Ken Hoang (Marth, Wolf)	(United States) Ricky "Hall" Diaz (Snake)	(United States) Kyle "SK92" King (Falco)
2013	Super Smash Bros. Melee	(United States) Joseph "Mango" Marquez (Fox, Falco, Mario)	(United States) Robert "Wobbles" Wright (Ice Climbers)	(United States) Juan "Hungrybox" Debiedma (Jigglypuff)	(Sweden) Adam "Armada" Lindgren (Peach)
2014	Super Smash Bros. Melee	(United States) Joseph "Mango" Marquez (Fox)	(United States) Juan "Hungrybox" Debiedma (Jigglypuff, Fox, Falco)	(Sweden) Adam "Armada" Lindgren (Peach, Young Link)	(United States) Kevin "PPMD" Nanney (Falco, Marth)
2015	Super Smash Bros. Melee	(Sweden) Adam "Armada" Lindgren (Fox, Peach)	(United States) Juan "Hungrybox" Debiedma (Jigglypuff)	(United States) Kevin "PPMD" Nanney (Falco, Marth)	(United States) Justin "Plup" McGrath (Sheik, Samus)
2015	Super Smash Bros. for Wii U	(Chile) Gonzalo "ZeRo" Barrios (Sheik, Diddy Kong)	(Netherlands) Ramin "Mr.R" Delshad (Sheik)	(United States) Nairoby "Nairo" Quezada (Zero Suit Samus)	(Japan) Yuta "Abadango" Kawamura (Wario, Rosalina, Pac-Man)
2016	Super Smash Bros. Melee	(United States) Juan "Hungrybox" Debiedma (Jigglypuff)	(Sweden) Adam "Armada" Lindgren (Fox, Peach)	(United States) Justin "Plup" McGrath (Sheik, Fox)	(United States) Joseph "Mango" Marquez (Fox, Falco)
2016	Super Smash Bros. for Wii U	(Canada) Elliot Bastien "Ally" Carroza-Oyarce (Mario)	(Japan) Takuto "Kamemushi" Ono (Mega Man, Yoshi, Cloud)	(Chile) Gonzalo "ZeRo" Barrios (Diddy Kong, Sheik)	(United States) James "VoiD" Makekau-Tyson (Sheik)
2017	Super Smash Bros. Melee	(Sweden) Adam "Armada" Lindgren (Peach)	(United States) Joseph "Mango" Marquez (Fox, Falco)	(United States) Juan "Hungrybox" Debiedma (Jigglypuff)	(United States) Jason "Mew2King" Zimmerman (Sheik, Marth, Fox)
2017	Super Smash Bros. for Wii U	(United States) Saleem "Salem" Akiel Young (Bayonetta)	(Chile) Gonzalo "ZeRo" Barrios (Diddy Kong)	(United States) Larry "Larry Lurr" Holland (Fox)	(United States) Gavin "Tweek" Dempsey (Cloud, Donkey Kong)
2018 (Evo Japan)	Super Smash Bros. for Wii U	(Mexico) Leonardo "MkLeo" López Pérez (Cloud, Marth)	(Japan) Yuta "Abadango" Kawamura (Bayonetta, Mewtwo)	(Japan) Takuto "Kameme" Ono (Mega Man, Cloud, Sheik)	(Japan) Yuta "Nietono" Uejima (Sheik, Diddy Kong)
2018	Super Smash Bros. Melee	(Sweden) William "Leffen" Hjelte (Fox)	(Sweden) Adam "Armada" Lindgren (Peach, Fox)	(United States) Justin "Plup" McGrath (Sheik)	(United States) Juan "Hungrybox" Debiedma (Jigglypuff)
2018	Super Smash Bros. for Wii U	(United States) Bharat "Lima" Chintapall (Bayonetta)	(United States) Zack "CaptainZack" Lauth (Bayonetta)	(Japan) Yuta "Nietono" Uejima (Sheik, Diddy Kong)	(Canada) Tamim "Mistake" Omary (Bayonetta)
2019	Super Smash Bros. Ultimate	(Mexico) Leonardo "MkLeo" López Pérez (Joker)	(United States) Gavin "Tweek" Dempsey (Pokémon Trainer)	(France) William "Glutonny" Belaid (Wario)	(United States) Ezra "Samsora" Morris (Peach)
2020 (Evo Japan)	Super Smash Bros. Ultimate	(Japan) Shuto "Shuton" Moriya (Olimar)	(Japan) Seisuke "Kome" Komeda (Shulk)	(Japan) Takuma "Tea" Hirooka (Pac-Man)	(Japan) Yutaro "Paseriman" Nagumo (Fox)

== Tekken ==
Year	Game	Top 4			
Year	Game	First	Second	Third	Fourth
2003	Tekken 4	(United States) Josh Eugene "JinKid" Molinaro (Jin)	(United States) Anthony "Jackie Tran" Tran (Steve, Jin)	(United States) Wiley "TreyPhoenix" Adams III (Jin)	(United States) Chetan "ChetChetty" Chetty (Paul)
2003	Tekken Tag Tournament	(South Korea) Bong-min Kim (Jin, Devil, Kazuya)	(United Kingdom) Ryan Hart (Jin, Heihachi)	(Japan) Kenbou "TARE" Kawakami (Lei, King)	(United States) Eric "JOP" Akins (Ogre, True Ogre)
2004	Tekken 4	(United States) Anthony "Jackie Tran" Tran (Steve, Jin)	(United States) Josh Eugene "JinKid" Molinaro (Jin, Heihachi)	(United States) Thomas "TomHilfiger" Kymn (Nina, Steve)	(Greece) Nikos "Aenica" Fourikis (Julia)
2004	Tekken Tag Tournament	(United Kingdom) Ryan Hart (Jin, Kazuya)	(United States) Shaun "Unconkable" Rivera (Armor King, Devil, Anna)	(United States) Brad "Slips" Vitale (Julia, Eddy)	(United States) Nick Shin (Julia, Michelle)
2005	Tekken 5	(United States) Christopher "Crow" Villarreal (Steve)	(Japan) Yuji "Yuu" Kato (Feng)	(South Korea) Dong-il "MadDogJin" Shin (Steve, Feng, Hwoarang)	(United States) Christopher "jra64" Abella (Nina)
2005	Tekken Tag Tournament	(South Korea) Byeong-mun "Qudans" Son (Jin, Kazuya, Heihachi)	(United Kingdom) Ryan Hart (Jin, Kazuya)	(United States) Thomas "TomHilfiger" Kymn (Jin, Devil, Julia, Heihachi)	(United States) Brad "Slips" Vitale (Eddy, Julia)
2006	Tekken 5	(United States) Christopher "Crow" Villarreal (Steve)	(United States) Bronson Tran (Ganryu)	(United States) Christopher "jra64" Abella (Steve, Roger Jr.)	(United States) Justin Wong (Feng)
2007	Tekken 5: Dark Resurrection	(United States) Josh "Arario" Park (Jack-5)	(United States) Spero "Spero Gin" Gineros (Eddy)	(United States) Bronson Tran (Ganryu)	(United States) Derek "Kane" Lee (Devil Jin)
2008	Tekken 5: Dark Resurrection	(United Kingdom) Ryan Hart (Kazuya)	(Puerto Rico) "Gandido" (Devil Jin)	(Puerto Rico) Mario "Canno" Canales (Eddy)	(United States) Noel Lawrence "VFanatic" Villadolid (King)
2010	Tekken 6	(South Korea) Hyun-kyu "Nin" Park (Steve)	(United States) Reepal "Rip" Parbhoo (Law)	(United States) Jimmy "Mr. NAPS" Tran (Bryan, Bruce)	(United States) Jim "Devil Jim" Esmersey (Julia)
2011	Tekken 6	(South Africa) / (United States) Rene "Kor" Maistry (Bob)	(United States) Shawn "Fab" Swain (Bob, Miguel)	(United States) Reepal "Rip" Parbhoo (Law)	(United States) James "JustFrameJames" Garrett (Law, Baek)
2013	Tekken Tag Tournament 2	(South Korea) Jae-min "Knee" Bae (Lars, Devil Jin, Bruce)	(United States) Bronson Tran (Ogre, Jinpachi)	(United States) Michael "Stringbean" Ramos (Alisa, Bob)	(South Korea) Hyun-kyu "Nin" Park (Marduk, Steve)
2014	Tekken Tag Tournament 2	(South Korea) Hyun-jin "JDCR" Kim (Heihachi, Armor King)	(Japan) Genki "Gen" Kumisaka (Bob, Leo)	(Japan) Akihiro "Ao" Abe (Alisa, Miguel)	(United States) Jimmy "Mr. NAPS" Tran (Bryan, Dragunov)
2015	Tekken 7	(Japan) Nakayama "Nobi" Daichi (Dragunov)	(Japan) Akihiro "Ao" Abe (Alisa)	(South Korea) Jin-woo "Saint" Choi (Shaheen)	(South Korea) Hyun-jin "JDCR" Kim (Heihachi)
2016	Tekken 7: Fated Retribution	(South Korea) Jin-woo "Saint" Choi (Jack-7)	(South Korea) Jae-min "Knee" Bae (Bryan, Heihachi, Akuma)	(South Korea) Chung-gon "Poongko" Lee (Akuma)	(United States) Anthony "Geesemaster" Jaimes (Feng)
2017	Tekken 7	(South Korea) Hyun-jin "JDCR" Kim (Dragunov, Heihachi)	(South Korea) Jin-woo "Saint" Choi (Jack-7)	(South Korea) Jae-min "Knee" Bae (Feng, Steve, Bryan, Devil Jin, Dragunov)	(Japan) Miyabe Taisei (Steve)
2018 (Evo Japan)	Tekken 7	(South Korea) Jae-min "Knee" Bae (Bryan, Paul, Steve)	(South Korea) Seong-ho "Chanel" Kang (Eliza, Alisa, Lucky Chloe, Akuma)	(South Korea) Chae "Gura" Dong (Lili, Geese)	(South Korea) Jin-woo "Saint" Choi (Jack-7)
2018	Tekken 7	(South Korea) Sun-woong "LowHigh" Youn (Shaheen, Bryan, Kazuya)	(South Korea) Byeong-mun "Qudans" Son (Devil Jin)	(United States) Terrelle "Lil Majin" Jackson (King)	(South Korea) Hyun-jin "JDCR" Kim (Dragunov)
2019 (Evo Japan)	Tekken 7	(Pakistan) Arslan "Arslan Ash" Siddique (Kazumi)	(Philippines) Alexandre "AK" Laverez (Shaheen, Paul)	(South Korea) Jae-Hyeon "CherryBerryMango" Kim (Jin, Noctis)	(Japan) Yuta "Chikurin" Take (Geese, Jin)
2019	Tekken 7	(Pakistan) Arslan "Arslan Ash" Siddique (Geese, Kazumi)	(South Korea) Jae-Min "Knee" Bae (Geese, Steve, Paul, Kazuya, Devil Jin)	(United States) Hoa "Anakin" Luu (Jack-7)	(Japan) Abe "Take" Takehiko (Kazumi)
2020 (Evo Japan)	Tekken 7	(Thailand) Nopparut "Book" Hempamorn (Leroy)	(Japan) "mikio" (Julia)	(Japan) "NOROMA" (Leroy, Steve)	(South Korea) Soo-hoon "ULSAN" Lin (Kazumi, Bob, Leroy)
2022	Tekken 7	(South Korea) Jae-Min "Knee" Bae (Feng)	(Pakistan) Imran "KHAN" Khan (Geese)	(Pakistan) Arslan "Arslan Ash" Siddique (Zafina)	(South Korea) Sang-hyun "JeonDDing" Jeon (Julia, Eddy)
2023 (Evo Japan)	Tekken 7	(Pakistan) Arslan "Arslan Ash" Siddique (Kunimitsu, Zafina)	(South Korea) Meo-IL (Geese)	(South Korea) Hyeon-Bo "Rangchu" Jeon (Julia, Panda)	(Japan) Watanabe (Eliza)
2023	Tekken 7	(Pakistan) Arslan "Arslan Ash" Siddique (Kunimitsu)	(Japan) Akihiro "Ao" Abe (Kunimitsu)	(South Korea) Soo-hoon "ULSAN" Lin (Bob, Feng, Kazumi)	(United States) Don "Genghis D0n" Brown (Katarina)
2024 (Evo Japan)	Tekken 8	(Japan) Yuta "Chikurin" Take (Lili)	(South Korea) Sun-woong "LowHigh" Youn (Dragunov, Steve)	(South Korea) Seong-ho "CHANEL" Kang (Alisa, Zafina)	(South Korea) Geon-ho "Mangja" Park (Law)
2024	Tekken 8	(Pakistan) Arslan "Arslan Ash" Siddique (Nina)	(Pakistan) Atif "Atif Butt" Ijaz (Dragunov, Feng)	(Japan) Nakayama "Nobi" Daichi (Dragunov)	(South Korea) Soo-hoon "ULSAN" Lin (Reina)
2025 (Evo Japan)	Tekken 8	(South Korea) Jae-Min "Knee" Bae (Bryan)	(South Korea) Jae-Gyun "Mulgold" Han (Claudio, Feng)	(South Korea) Geon-ho "Mangja" Park (Law)	(Japan) "PINYA" (Raven)
2025	Tekken 8	(Pakistan) Arslan "Arslan Ash" Siddique (Anna, Nina)	(Pakistan) Atif "Atif Butt" Ijaz (Anna)	(Japan) Yuta "Chikurin" Take (Clive, Lili)	(South Korea) Jae-Gyun "Mulgold" Han (Claudio)
2025 (EVO France)	Tekken 8	(Pakistan) Arslan "Arslan Ash" Siddique (Anna, Nina)	(South Korea) Sang-Hyun "Jeondding" Jeon (Eddy)	(Republic of Ireland) Fergus McGee (Asuka)	(United States) Rey "KingReyJr" Matthew Escanio (Asuka)
2026 (Evo Japan)	Tekken 8	(South Korea) Min-Kyu "iKARi" Kim (Kazuya)	(South Korea) Jae-Min "Knee" Bae (Bryan, Heihachi)	(Pakistan) Hafiz Tanveer (Nina, Claudio)	(Philippines) Alexandre "AK" Laverez (Shaheen)
2026	Tekken 8	(Pakistan) Arslan "Arslan Ash" Siddique (Kunimitsu, Nina)	(South Korea) Hyeon-Bo "Rangchu" Jeon (Fahkumram)	(South Korea) Sun-Woong "LowHigh" Youn (Bryan)	(South Korea) Sang-Hyun "Jeondding" Jeon (Eddy)
2026 (Evo France)	Tekken 8	(South Korea) Sang-Hyun "Jeondding" Jeon (Eddy)	(South Korea) Sun-Woong "LowHigh" Youn (Bryan)	(South Korea) Soo-hoon "ULSAN" Lin (Dragunov)	(Pakistan) Muhammad "Dawood Sikandar" Dawood (Alisa)

== Under Night In-Birth ==
Year	Game	Top 4			
Year	Game	First	Second	Third	Fourth
2019	Under Night In-Birth Exe:Late[st]	(Japan) Masaru “Clearlamp” Higuchi (Byakuya)	(Japan) “Oushuu-Hittou” (Seth)	(Japan) "Hishigata" (Nanase)	(Japan) “Kure” (Yuzuriha)
2024 (Evo Japan)	Under Night In-Birth II [Sys:Celes]	(Japan) "Kyo" (Gordeau)	(Japan) "Crimson Crusader" (Gordeau)	(Japan) "CROW" (Merkava)	(United States) "Isaac" (Hyde)
2024	Under Night In-Birth II [Sys:Celes]	(Japan) "Senaru" (Eltnum)	(United Kingdom) "Mo.Sin" (Kuon)	(Japan) "Notes" (Carmine)	(United States) "Defiant" (Londrekia)
2025	Under Night In-Birth II [Sys:Celes]	(United States) "Defiant" (Londrekia, Hyde, Ogre)	(United States) Izayah "BigBlack" Davis (Byakuya)	(United States) "Knotts" (Seth, Wagner, Orie)	(Mexico) Mario Silva (Wagner)
2026 (Evo Japan)	Under Night In-Birth II [Sys:Celes]	(Japan) "Oushuu-Hittou" (Seth)	(Japan) "Chobi" (Ogre, Kuon)	(Japan) "Mawaru" (Hilda)	(Japan) "Senaru" (Eltnum)
2026	Under Night In-Birth II [Sys:Celes]	(United States) Izayah "BigBlack" Davis (Byakuya)	(United States) "Knotts" (Orie, Wagner, Seth)	(United States) "Pierre" (Tsurugi)	(United States) Filip "2GB Combo" Koperwas (Carmine)

== Virtua Fighter ==
Year	Game	Top 4			
Year	Game	First	Second	Third	Fourth
2003	Virtua Fighter 4: Evolution	(Japan) "Chibata"	(Japan) "Ohsu-Akira"	(United Kingdom) Ryan Hart	(Japan) "Neo Tower"
2004	Virtua Fighter 4: Evolution	(Japan) Hiromiki "Itabashi Zangief" Kumada	(Japan) "Shoutime"	(Japan) "Kurita"	(United Kingdom) Ryan Hart
2007	Virtua Fighter 5	(Japan) Hiromiki "Itabashi Zangief" Kumada (Shun)	(Japan) Shinya "Nuki" Onuki (Aoi, Pai)	(Japan) "Yosuke Otome" (Jacky)	(Japan) Hajime "Tokido" Taniguchi (Pai)
2023 (Evo Japan)	Virtua Fighter 5: Ultimate Showdown	(Japan) "Ton-chan" (Jacky)	(Japan) Akani Shiwapo (Pai)	(Japan) "Virgo" (Jean)	(Japan) "Yogo" (Sarah)
2026 (Evo Japan)	Virtua Fighter 5 R.E.V.O. World Stage	(Japan) "Virgo" (Jean)	(Japan) "Yatsuki" (Jacky)	(Japan) "Maido" (Pai)	(Japan) "Bita" (Aoi)
2026	Virtua Fighter 5 R.E.V.O. World Stage	(United States) Avery "GentlemanThief" Carey (Akira, Jean)	(Japan) "Gakusei Sarah" (Jacky, Sarah, Kage)	(United States) "Tricky" (Eileen)	(United States) "VFNumbers" (Lei)

== Other fighting games ==
Year	Game	Top 4			
Year	Game	First	Second	Third	Fourth
2006	Dead or Alive 4	(United States) Carl "Perfect Legend" White (Hayate, Hayabusa, Gen, Jann Lee)	(United States) Emmanuel "MASTER" Rodriguez (Hayabusa)	(United States) Luke "The High Guy" Hess (Zack, Leifang)	(United States) Daniel "King" Roberson (Hayabusa)
2010	Tatsunoko vs. Capcom: Ultimate All-Stars	(United States) Martin "Marn" Phan (Zero, Alex)	(United States) Kevin "KBeast" Baigan (Yatterman-1, Batsu, Yatterman-2, Mega Man Volnutt, Tekkaman)	(United States) Justin Wong (Jun, Chun-Li, Karas, Ryu, Saki, Tekkaman Blade)	(United States) Jeff "Kurasa" Blyden (Chun-Li, Doronjo, Saki)
2016	Pokkén Tournament	(Japan) "Tonosama" (Braixen, Sceptile)	(Japan) “buntan” (Suicune)	(United States) "Swilio" (Mewtwo)	(Japan) “Potetin” (Mewtwo, Pikachu Libre, Weavile, Chandelure)
2018 (Evo Japan)	ARMS	(Japan) "Pega" (Max)	(United States) Jonathan "GoreMagala" Valdes (Helix, Max)	(Japan) "Sukuran" (Master Mummy)	(Canada) Eve "Mileve" Schafer (Mechanica)
2022	Skullgirls 2nd Encore	(United States) Dominique "SonicFox" McLean (Ms. Fortune, Annie, Robo Fortune)	(United States) Jon "dekillsage" Coello (Filia, Big Band, Annie)	(Japan) "penpen" (Ms. Fortune, Annie, Big Band, Robo Fortune)	(United States) Daniel "Cloud" Normandia (Valentine, Cerebella, Double)
2025 (EVO France)	Hunter × Hunter: Nen × Impact	(Japan) "Heiho" (Uvogin, Morel, Chrollo)	(Japan) "ROW1" (Uvogin, Morel, Chrollo)	(Portugal) "pbl`" (Uvogin, Morel, Chrollo)	(France) "BRZ" (Uvogin, Leorio, Killua)
2026 (Evo Japan)	Fist of the North Star	(Japan) "K.I" (Rei, Yuda)	(Japan) "Yuttori" (Toki, Raoh)	(Japan) "KG" (Toki)	(Japan) "matayoshi" (Raoh)
2026	Rivals of Aether 2	(United States) Justin "Plup" McGrath (Orcane, La Reina)	(United States) Alex "CakeAssault" Strobel (Fleet, Forsburn)	(United States) Nick Stango (Loxodont)	(United States) William "Bbatts" Batista (Fleet)
2026	Invincible VS	(Japan) "Heiho" (Omni-Man, Rex Splode, Robot)	(United States) Drew "Zippy" Stakelum (Omni-Man, Invincible, Rex Splode)	(United States) "BoyManGuyPalBudBroBae" (Omni-Man, Invincible, Rex Splode)	(United States) Dyllan "Dylnyan" Guerrero (Bulletproof, Omni-Man, Rex Splode)
2026 (Evo France)	Avatar Legends: The Fighting Game	(Uruguay) Martín "Pepe Uehara" Portela (Toph)	(France) Raymond Buller (Korra)	(United States) Brandon "Zane" Wanders (Zaheer)	(United Kingdom) Armari "ScytheLDN" Anirah (Katara)
2026 (Evo France)	Marvel Tokon: Fighting Souls	(Israel) Atir "Zando" Yosef (Magik, Storm, Green Goblin, Blade)	(Japan) "YMST" (Blade, Spider-Man, Magneto, Hulk)	(Saudi Arabia) Molham "Slash" Qazili (Spider-Man, Carnage, Deadpool, Magneto)	(United States) Lenwood "INZEM" Arnold (Spider-Man, Green Goblin, Magneto, Blade)

== Non-fighting game ==
Year	Game	Top 4			
Year	Game	First	Second	Third	Fourth
2006	Mario Kart DS	(United States) Cameron “CAM” Tangen	(United States) Josh "Husky217" Habben	(United States) Adam Sexton	(United States) John Cosentino

== Players with multiple championships ==
Wins	Player	Alias	Years	Game(s)
9	(United States) Justin Wong	Jwong	2001; 2002; 2003; 2004; 2006; 2008; 2009; 2010; 2014	Marvel vs. Capcom 2: New Age of Heroes (Battle by the Bay); Marvel vs. Capcom 2: New Age of Heroes; Marvel vs. Capcom 2: New Age of Heroes; Marvel vs. Capcom 2: New Age of Heroes; Marvel vs. Capcom 2: New Age of Heroes; Marvel vs. Capcom 2: New Age of Heroes; Street Fighter III: 3rd Strike teams Marvel vs. Capcom 2: New Age of Heroes; Ultimate Marvel vs. Capcom 3
8	(Pakistan) Arslan Siddique	Arslan Ash	2019; 2023; 2024; 2025; 2026	Tekken 7 (Evo Japan, Evo 2019); Tekken 7 (Evo Japan, Evo 2023); Tekken 8 Tekken 8 (Evo 2025, Evo France); Tekken 8
8	(United States) Dominique McLean	SonicFox	2014; 2015; 2016; 2018; 2019; 2022; 2024; 2025	Injustice: Gods Among Us; Mortal Kombat X Mortal Kombat XL; Dragon Ball FighterZ; Mortal Kombat 11; Skullgirls 2nd Encore; Mortal Kombat 1 Mortal Kombat 1
7	(China) Zeng Zhuojun	Xiaohai	2014; 2023; 2024; 2025; 2026	The King of Fighters XIII; The King of Fighters XV (Evo Japan, Evo 2023); The King of Fighters XV; Fatal Fury: City of the Wolves (Evo France); Fatal Fury: City of the Wolves (Evo Japan, Evo 2026)
6	(South Korea) Seon-Woo Lee	Infiltration	2012; 2013; 2016; 2018; 2019	Super Street Fighter IV: Arcade Edition Version 2012, Street Fighter x Tekken teams Street Fighter x Tekken; Street Fighter V Street Fighter V: Arcade Edition (Evo Japan); Samurai Shodown
6	(Japan) Daigo Umehara	Daigo	2003; 2004; 2009; 2010	Super Street Fighter II Turbo, Guilty Gear X2; Super Street Fighter II Turbo, Guilty Gear X2; Street Fighter IV; Super Street Fighter IV
4	(Dominican Republic) Saul Mena II	MenaRD	2024; 2025; 2026	Street Fighter 6 (Evo Japan); Street Fighter 6 (Evo Japan, Evo 2025); Street Fighter 6
4	(United States) Jo'siah Miller	Hikari	2023; 2025; 2026	Dragon Ball FighterZ; Dragon Ball FighterZ (Evo France); 2XKO (Evo Japan, Evo 2026)
4	(South Korea) Jae-min Bae	Knee	2013; 2018; 2022; 2025	Tekken Tag Tournament 2 Tekken 7 (Evo Japan); Tekken 7 Tekken 8 (Evo Japan)
4	(Japan) Ryo Yoshida	BAS	2001; 2005; 2006; 2007	Street Fighter Alpha 3 (Battle by the Bay); Capcom vs. SNK 2 Guilty Gear XX Slash teams Capcom vs. SNK 2
3	(Japan) Goichi Kishida	GO1	2019; 2025; 2026	Dragon Ball FighterZ; Fatal Fury: City of the Wolves; Fatal Fury: City of the Wolves (Evo France)
3	(Japan)	Heiho	2018; 2025; 2026	BlazBlue: Cross Tag Battle; Hunter × Hunter: Nen × Impact (Evo France); Invincible VS
3	(Taiwan) Lin Chiahung	E.T.	2017; 2024; 2025	The King of Fighters XIV; The King of Fighters XV (Evo Japan); The King of Fighters XV (Evo Japan)
3	(Japan)	Gamera	2019; 2022; 2023	Samurai Shodown (Evo Japan); Granblue Fantasy Versus; Granblue Fantasy Versus (Evo Japan)
3	(Japan) Hajime Taniguchi	Tokido	2002; 2007; 2017	Capcom vs. SNK 2 Super Street Fighter II Turbo; Street Fighter V
3	(United States) Carl White	Perfect Legend	2006; 2011; 2012	Dead or Alive 4 Mortal Kombat; Mortal Kombat
3	(United States) John Choi	Choiboy	2000; 2008	Street Fighter Alpha 3 (Battle by the Bay); Super Street Fighter II Turbo, Capcom vs. SNK 2
3	(Japan) Shinya Ohnuki	Nuki	2005; 2007; 2008	Street Fighter III: 3rd Strike; Street Fighter III: 3rd Strike; Street Fighter III: 3rd Strike
3	(United States) Alex Valle	CaliPower	1996; 2000	Street Fighter Alpha 2 (Battle by the Bay); Street Fighter Alpha 2 (Battle by the Bay), Street Fighter III: 3rd Strike (Battle by the Bay)
2	(United States) Shamar Hinds	Nitro	2024; 2026	Guilty Gear Strive; Guilty Gear Strive (Evo France)
2	(Japan)	Kaji	2026	Vampire Savior (Evo Japan, Evo 2026)
2	(United States) Matthieu Fardet	Kojicoco	2025; 2026	Granblue Fantasy Versus: Rising; Granblue Fantasy Versus: Rising
2	(Japan) Masanobu Murakami	M'	2019; 2026	The King of Fighters XIV (Evo Japan); The King of Fighters XV (Evo Japan)
2	(Japan)	Kasausagi	2025; 2026	Granblue Fantasy Versus: Rising (Evo Japan); Granblue Fantasy Versus: Rising (Evo Japan)
2	(Sweden) William Hjelte	Leffen	2018; 2023	Super Smash Bros. Melee; Guilty Gear Strive
2	(Taiwan) Chia-Chen Tseng	ZJZ	2018; 2022	The King of Fighters XIV (Evo Japan); The King of Fighters XV
2	(Mexico) Leonardo López Pérez	MkLeo	2018; 2019	Super Smash Bros. for Wii U (Evo Japan); Super Smash Bros. Ultimate
2	(Japan) Yusuke Momochi	Momochi	2015; 2019	Ultra Street Fighter IV; Street Fighter V: Arcade Edition (Evo Japan)
2	(Japan) Omito Hashimoto	Omito	2017; 2018	Guilty Gear Xrd REV 2 Guilty Gear Xrd REV 2
2	(South Korea) Hyun-jin Kim	JDCR	2014; 2017	Tekken Tag Tournament 2 Tekken 7
2	(Sweden) Adam Lindgren	Armada	2015; 2017	Super Smash Bros. Melee; Super Smash Bros. Melee
2	(United States) Joseph Marquez	Mango	2013; 2014	Super Smash Bros. Melee; Super Smash Bros. Melee
2	(United Kingdom) Ryan Hart	ProdigalSon	2004; 2008	Tekken Tag Tournament; Tekken 5: Dark Resurrection
2	(Japan) Hiromiki Kumada	Itabashi Zangief / Itazan	2004; 2007	Virtua Fighter 4: Evolution; Virtua Fighter 5
2	(United States) Christopher Villarreal	Crow	2005; 2006	Tekken 5 Tekken 5
2	(Japan) Yosuke Ito	Kindevu	2004; 2006	Capcom vs. SNK 2 Capcom vs. SNK 2
2	(United States) Duc Do	Ducvader	2000; 2005	Marvel vs. Capcom 2: New Age of Heroes (Battle by the Bay); Marvel vs. Capcom 2: New Age of Heroes
2	(Japan) Kenji Obata	KO	2003; 2004	Street Fighter III: 3rd Strike; Street Fighter III: 3rd Strike
2	(United States) Jason Cole	Afro Cole	2001; 2002	Super Street Fighter II Turbo (Battle by the Bay); Super Street Fighter II Turbo

== Championships by country ==
Information last updated after EVO France 2026.

Country	Titles^{[1]}
Japan	101
United States	91
South Korea	22
Pakistan	8
China	7
France	6
Taiwan	6
United Kingdom	4
Sweden	4
Dominican Republic	4
Chile	3
Mexico	2
Israel	1
Uruguay	1
Spain	1
Saudi Arabia	1
Singapore	1
United Arab Emirates	1
Canada	1
Thailand	1

^{1} The 2009 Street Fighter III: 3rd Strike 2v2 tournament was counted for both the US and Japan, as the winning team consisted of one player from each country; the 2006 Mario Kart tournament, as a non-fighting game, was not counted.
