= Evo 2022 =

Fighting game event held in Las Vegas

2022 Evolution Championship Series
- Evolution Championship Series logo

Tournament information
- Location: Las Vegas, United States
- Dates: August 5, 2022–August 7, 2022
- Venue: Mandalay Bay

Final positions
- Champions: GGS: Claire "UMISHO" Harrison; SFVAE: Masaki Kawano; T7: Jae-min "Knee" Bae; KOFXV: Chia-Chen "ZJZ" Tseng; DBFZ: Marwan "Wawa" Berthe; GBVS: "Gamera"; MBTL: Jing; MK11U: Matías "Scorpionprocs" Martínez; SG2E: Dominique "SonicFox" McLean

Tournament statistics
- Attendance: ~7,500

The 2022 Evolution Championship Series (commonly referred to as Evo 2022 or EVO 2022) was a fighting game event held in Las Vegas from August 5 to 7, 2022 as part of the long-running Evolution Championship Series. The event offered tournaments for various video games, including Street Fighter V, Tekken 7, and Dragon Ball FighterZ, as well as the newly released Melty Blood: Type Lumina, Granblue Fantasy Versus and The King of Fighters XV. It also marks the first time that Skullgirls was a main event game 10 years after its release. This is the first tournament held in-person since 2019. This is the first tournament sponsored under the co-sponsors Sony Corporation and Pokimane-led RTS.

== Venue ==
EVO 2022 was, once again, hosted at the Mandalay Bay resort. The Mandalay Bay Convention Center hosted the first two days of the event, while Michelob Ultra Arena hosted the final day for the fifth consecutive tournament.

== Games ==
The lineup was announced in March 2022 to have 9 games. Returning from last year are Tekken 7 and Dragon Ball FighterZ. Street Fighter V and Mortal Kombat 11 returned as updates Street Fighter V: Championship Edition and Mortal Kombat 11 Ultimate respectively. New additions are Guilty Gear Strive, KOF XV (replacing KOF XIV), Granblue Fantasy Versus, Melty Blood: Type Lumina, and Skullgirls 2nd Encore. Super Smash Bros. Ultimate was confirmed not to return to the tournament before the official reveal, marking the first time a Smash game was not in the main lineup since EVO 2012.

== Participants ==
7,445 participants were at Evo 2022.

== Broadcast ==
As usual, the tournament was streamed on the streaming site Twitch, broadcast across multiple different streams.

== Reveals ==
A surprise teaser for an undisclosed Tekken project was showcased during Tekken 7's tournament. It would later be formally announced as Tekken 8 during Sony's State of Play presentation on September 13, 2022.

== Results ==
Guilty Gear Strive
Place	Player	Alias	Character(s)
1st	(United States) Claire Harrison	UMISHO	Happy Chaos
2nd	(Saudi Arabia) Molham Qazili	Slash	May
3rd	(Sweden) William Hjelte	Leffen	Zato-1
4th	(United States) Julian Harris	Hotashi	Nagoriyuki
5th	(Canada) Justin Campbell	PepperySplash	Zato-1
5th	(South Korea) Jaewon Kim	Daru	I-No
7th	(United States) unknown	Bean	Chipp
7th	(United States) Matthew Tulloch	TempestNYC	Leo

Street Fighter V: Champion Edition
Place	Player	Alias	Character(s)
1st	(Japan) Masaki Kawano	Kawano	Kolin
2nd	(United States) Derek Ruffin	iDom	Laura, Poison
3rd	(Japan) Tsunehiro Kanamori	gachikun	Rashid
4th	(Japan) Hajime Taniguchi	Tokido	Urien, Luke
5th	(Japan) Daigo Umehara	Daigo	Guile
5th	(Taiwan) Li-Wei Lin	Oil King	Rashid, Seth
7th	(United States) David Edwards	JustAKid	Juri
7th	(France) Nathan Massol	Mister Crimson	Dhalsim

Tekken 7
Place	Player	Alias	Character(s)
1st	(South Korea) Jae-Min Bae	Knee	Feng
2nd	(Pakistan) Imran Khan	Khan	Geese
3rd	(Pakistan) Arslan Siddique	Arslan Ash	Zafina
4th	(South Korea) Sang-hyun Jeon	Jeondding	Julia, Eddy Gordo
5th	(South Korea) Oh Dae-il	Meo-IL	Geese
5th	(France) Vincent Homan	Super Akouma	Akuma
7th	(South Korea) Jeong Hyeon-ho	Rangchu	Julia, Panda
7th	(Japan) unknown	PINYA	Master Raven

The King of Fighters XV
Place	Player	Alias	Character(s)
1st	(Taiwan) Chia-Chen Tseng	ZJZ	Kula/Krohnen/B. Jenet
2nd	(Taiwan) Lin Chiahung	E.T.	Kula/B. Jenet/Krohnen
3rd	(Taiwan) Chen Sui Yang	Xiaohey	Benimaru/Rock Howard/Kyo Kusanagi
4th	(South Korea) Myung Gu Kang	Lacid	Meitenkun/Shermie/Ash
5th	(Mexico) Ruben Partida	PAKO	Chizuru/Luong/Elisabeth
5th	(Japan) Akihito Sawada	Score	Yashiro/Chizuru/B.Jenet
7th	(Mexico) Julio Gomez	Seis mx	Kula/Chizuru/Krohnen
7th	(Japan) unknown	mok	Kurki/B. Jenet/Krohnen

Dragon Ball FighterZ
Place	Player	Alias	Character(s)
1st	(France) Marwan Berthe	Wawa	Gogeta (SSGSS)/Vegito (SSGSS)/Adult Gohan
2nd	(United States) Shamar H.	Nitro	Android 21 (Lab Coat)/Goku (SSGSS)/Android 21
3rd	(France) unknown	Yasha	Gogeta (SSGSS)/Vegito (SSGSS)/Android 18
4th	(France) Mohamed Sobti	Kayne	Gogeta (SS4)/Android 21 (Lab Coat)/Tien
5th	(United States) Eric Bonilla	LegendaryyPred	Teen Gohan/Android 21 (Lab Coat)/Android 21
5th	(Japan) Shoji Sho	Fenritti	Gogeta (SSGSS)/Vegito (SSGSS)/Android 21 (Lab Coat)
7th	(Spain) Joan Namay Millones	Shanks	Perfect Cell/Vegeta (Super Saiyan)/Janemba
7th	(United States) Brandon Wanders	Zane	Zamasu (Fused)/Android 21 (Lab Coat)/Beerus

Granblue Fantasy Versus
Place	Player	Alias	Character(s)
1st	(Japan) unknown	Gamera	Djeeta, Vira
2nd	(Japan) unknown	Tororo	Percival
3rd	(Japan) unknown	Tako	Belial
4th	(Japan) unknown	Ren	Charlotta, Avatar Belial, Seox
5th	(Japan) unknown	Kamiki C	Beelzebub
5th	(Spain) Mikel Aramburu	Dragoi	Belial
7th	(United States) Jeff P.	Zombmu	Cagliostro
7th	(United States) Oscar Jaimes	Shinku	Vira

Melty Blood: Type Lumina
Place	Player	Alias	Character(s)
1st	(Japan) unknown	Jing	Hisui
2nd	(United States) Damian Fullbright	Masoma	Vlov
3rd	(United States) unknown	Kiri	Noel
4th	(United States) Jose Ballestero	ScrawtVermillion	Mario
5th	(Japan) unknown	uncle_akkey	Shiki
5th	(Japan) unknown	ul	Shiki
7th	(United States) Eli Zhu	Safe	Vlov
7th	(United States) unknown	Lunar	Dead Apostle Noel

Mortal Kombat 11
Place	Player	Alias	Character(s)
1st	(Chile) Matías Martínez	Scorpionprocs	Fujin, Kabal, Kung Lao, Liu Kang
2nd	(United States) Curtis McCall	Rewind	Kano, Kotal Khan, Liu Kang
3rd	(Chile) Nicolás Martínez	Nicholas	Kabal, Fujin, Kung Lao
4th	(United Kingdom) Denom Jones	A F0xy Grampa	RoboCop, Nightwolf, Kitana
5th	(United States) Elhaan Rashid	Han Rashid	Fujin
5th	(United States) Dominique McLean	SonicFox	RoboCop, Joker, Cassie Cage, Shang Tsung
7th	(Brazil) Bruno Henrique Sousa	KillerXinok	Spawn
7th	(United States) Joey Cortez	KingGambler	Sub-Zero

Skullgirls 2nd Encore
Place	Player	Alias	Character(s)
1st	(United States) Dominique McLean	SonicFox	Ms. Fortune/Annie/Robo-Fortune
2nd	(United States) Jon Coello	dekillsage	Filia/Big Band/Annie
3rd	(Japan) unknown	penpen	Ms. Fortune/Big Band/Annie, Ms. Fortune/Robo-Fortune/Annie
4th	(United States) Daniel Normandia	Cloud	Valentine/Cerebella/Double
5th	(United States) Jeremiah Beaty	WingZero	Filia
5th	(United States) Josue Nunez	LazyBakeOven	Ms. Fortune/Eliza
7th	(United States) unknown	Stuff	Painwheel/Robo-Fortune/Cerebella
7th	(United States) unknown	Dudeguy M.B.	Beowulf
