= E.T. (gamer) =

Taiwanese esports player (born 1985)

Personal information
- Name: 林家弘 (Lin Chia-hung)
- Born: 20 November 1984 (age 42); Taiwan

Career information
- Playing career: 2013–present

Team history
- 2025: Team Falcons

Career highlights and awards
- 2× EVO Las Vegas champion (2017, 2025); 2× EVO Japan champion (2024, 2025)

YouTube information
- Channel: DBJET
- Subscribers: 64 thousand

Chinese name
- Traditional Chinese: 林家弘
- Simplified Chinese: 林家弘
Transcriptions
Standard Mandarin
- Hanyu Pinyin: Lín Jiāhóng
Southern Min
- Hokkien POJ: Lîm Ka-hông

Lin Chia-hung (Chinese: 林家弘; pinyin: Lín Jiāhóng; Pe̍h-ōe-jī: Lîm Ka-hông; born 20 November 1984), better known as E.T., is a Taiwanese professional player, especially in SNK games including The King of Fighters and Fatal Fury, and also streams as a YouTuber. He is a three-time EVO champion, being one of the few in history to accomplish this feat. He won in EVO Las Vegas 2017 and EVO Japan 2024 and 2025, being the oldest King of Fighters winner in tournament history.

== Career ==
In 2024, E.T. defeated his biggest rival Xiaohai to win EVO Japan at The King of Fighters XV. He defended his title and won again the next year.

E.T. won the Extended Lineup tournament for EVO 2025 at The King of Fighters XV and was a finalist for the main stage game Fatal Fury: City of the Wolves, reaching the deciding round in the grand final.

On May 6, 2025, E.T. joined his first sponsored team, Team Falcons together with Chinese Fatal Fury champion Mok and Street Fighter player Chris Wong.

== Public image ==
E.T. is well respected among peers and is known for using established fighters in tournaments.
