= Evo 2011 =

2011 Evolution Championship Series

Tournament information
- Location: Las Vegas, Nevada, United States
- Dates: July 29–31
- Tournament format: Double elimination
- Venue: Rio All Suite Hotel and Casino

The 2011 Evolution Championship Series (commonly referred to as Evo 2011 or EVO 2011) was a fighting game event held in the Rio Las Vegas on July 6–8. The event featured a major tournament for five fighting games, including Super Street Fighter IV: Arcade Edition and Marvel vs. Capcom 3, as well as various smaller-scale competitions.

== Background ==
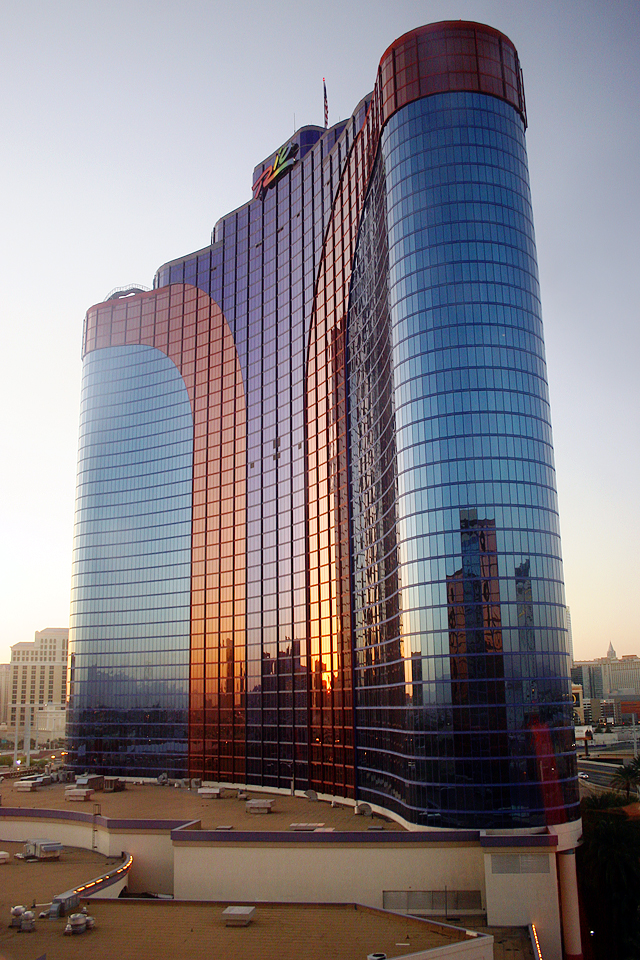
Rio All Suite Hotel and Casino

Many of the major Street Fighter tournaments had added themselves to "The Road to Evo" group of events in 2011. Players who ranked well in these tournaments would receive a better seed in the Evolution Championship. Five such major tournaments were held between May 27 and June 25, 2011: UFGT7, Montreal Annual Tournament VIII, CEO 2011, NorCal Regionals 9, and East Coast Throwdown 3. IGN noted that competitors had taken a more serious stance towards these tournaments in 2011.

Evo 2011 was held on July 6–8 in the Rio All Suite Hotel and Casino. The event was livestreamed on Ustream and reached over 2 million unique viewers consuming over 1.9 million hours of video content in total. This livestream was produced as collaborative efforts of fighting game sites iPlayWinner, Team Sp00ky, Offcast, and FinestKO. The livestream was also available on PlayStation Home.

== Event summary ==
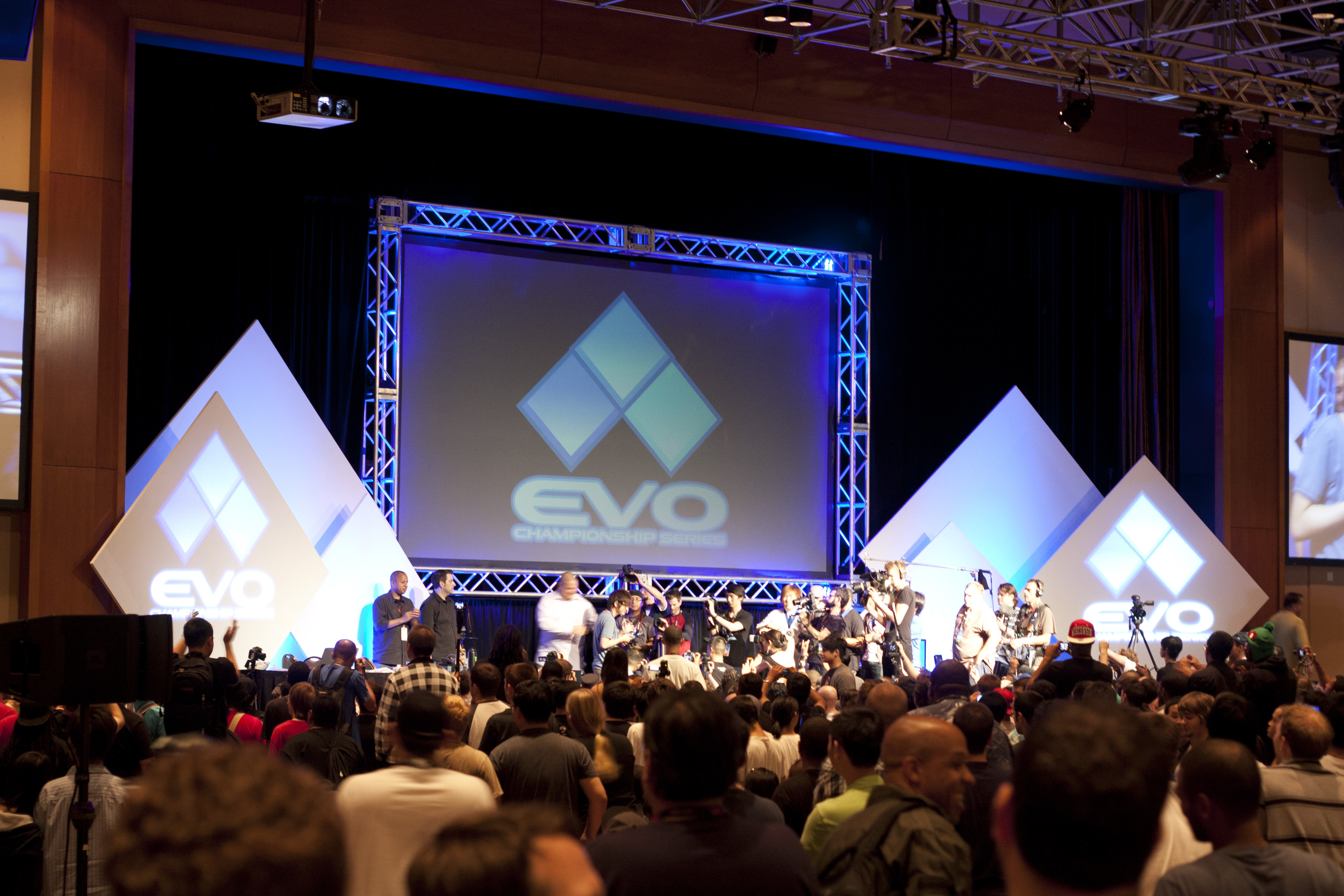
Fuudo receiving his trophy at the Street Fighter IV award ceremony

Evo 2011 featured major tournaments for Super Street Fighter IV: Arcade Edition, Marvel vs Capcom 3, Mortal Kombat 9, Tekken 6, and BlazBlue: Continuum Shift II, as well as a side event for Street Fighter III: 3rd Strike. The Street Fighter IV tournament was won by Keita "Fuudo" Ai, playing with the character Fei Long. The grand finals for Marvel vs Capcom 3 were won by Jay "BOX Viscant" Snyder.

Engadget reported on the success of eight-year-old competitor Noah Solis in the 2011 Marvel vs Capcom 3 tournament, who made it into the top 48 before being eliminated by an older competitor. In an interview with GiantBomb, Solis' father spoke of how he intends to support his son's success in fighting games, citing video games as one way alongside education to avoid falling into gang culture.

Evo 2011 featured various panels with people such as Yoshinori Ono, Seth Killian, Daigo Umehara, and Bandai Namco Entertainment.

== Results ==
Super Street Fighter IV: Arcade Edition
| Place | Player | Alias | Character(s) |
|---|---|---|---|
| 1st | (Japan) Keita Ai | Fuudo | Fei Long |
| 2nd | (Saudi Arabia) Abdullatif Alhmili | Brokentier Latif | C.Viper |
| 3rd | (United States) Poongko | | Seth |
| 4th | (Japan) Daigo Umehara | Mad Catz MCZ D | Yun |
| 5th | (Japan) Yosuke Ito | eLive|Pro Kindevu | Yun |
| 5th | (Japan) Hajime Taniguchi | Tokido MCZ | Akuma |
| 7th | (United States) Joshua Philpot | Wolfkrone | C.Viper |
| 7th | (United States) Peter Susini | FlashMetroid | Zangief, C.Viper |

Marvel vs. Capcom 3: Fate of Two Worlds
| Place | Player | Alias | Character(s) |
|---|---|---|---|
| 1st | (United States) Jay Snyder | BOX Viscant | Wesker/Haggar/Phoenix, Wesker/Iron Man/Phoenix |
| 2nd | (United States) Eduardo Pérez-Frangie | MCZ|DMG PR Balrog | Dante/Wolverine/Tron, Dante/Amaterasu/Wolverine |
| 3rd | (United States) Justin Wong | EG Justin Wong | She-Hulk/Wolverine/Akuma, Storm/Wesker/Akuma, Wolverine/Storm/Akuma |
| 4th | (United States) Peter Rosas | coL.CC Combofiend | She-Hulk/Taskmaster/Spencer |
| 5th | (United States) Noel Brown | UVG Noel Brown | Wesker/Wolverine/Akuma, Wolverine/Wesker/Phoenix |
| 5th | (United States) Ryan Ramirez | coL.CC Filipino Champ | Magneto/Sentinel/Phoenix, Magneto/Dormammu/Phoenix |
| 7th | (United States) Tinh Ngo | Mine | Wesker/Taskmaster/Phoenix |
| 7th | (United States) Raymond Monsada | X-Ray | Dante/Amaterasu/Magneto |

Mortal Kombat
| Place | Player | Alias | Character(s) |
|---|---|---|---|
| 1st | (United States) Carl White | EMP Perfect Legend | Kung Lao |
| 2nd | (United States) Giuseppe Grosso | vVv REO | Mileena, Cyrax |
| 3rd | (United States) Eric Akins | JOP | Johnny Cage, Raiden |
| 4th | (United States) Christopher Gonzalez | NYChris G | Reptile |
| 5th | (United States) Denzell Terry | Denzell Terry | Liu Kang |
| 5th | (United States) Stephanie Brownback | 16-Bit | Kitana |
| 7th | (United States) Pirrelli Trumer | ATL Redd | Liu Kang |
| 7th | (United States) Anthony Villanueva | OnlineTony213 | Kabal |

Tekken 6
| Place | Player | Alias | Character(s) |
|---|---|---|---|
| 1st | (United States) Rene Maistry | DMG|Kor | Bob |
| 2nd | (United States) Shawn Swain | Fab | Bob, Miguel |
| 3rd | (United States) Reepal Parbhoo | Rip | Law |
| 4th | (United States) James Garrett | JustFrameJames | Law, Baek |
| 5th | (United States) Christopher Villarreal | Crow | Bob |
| 5th | (United States) Jimmy Tran | Mr. Naps | Bryan |
| 7th | (United Kingdom) Ryan Hart | LLL|Ryan Hart | Kazuya |
| 7th | (Japan) Hajime Taniguchi | MCZ|Tokido | Bob |

BlazBlue: Continuum Shift II
| Place | Player | Alias | Character(s) |
|---|---|---|---|
| 1st | (United States) Alex Chen | Spark | Hakumen |
| 2nd | (United States) Steve Barthelemy | Lord Knight | Litchi, Makoto |
| 3rd | (Japan) Hajime Taniguchi | MCZ|Tokido | Noel |
| 4th | (United States) Kyle Bourne | Zong One | Carl |
| 5th | (United States) Rob Nagaro | HeartNana | Makoto |
| 5th | (United States) Severine Grey | Sev | Lambda-11 |
| 7th | (United States) Damien Brantley | Dsmoove12 | Noel |
| 7th | (United States) Dong Yim | Wuku | Hazama |
