= Evo 2023 =

Fighting game event held in Las Vegas

2023 Evolution Championship Series
- 2023
- Evolution Championship Series logo

Tournament information
- Location: Las Vegas, United States
- Dates: August 4, 2023–August 6, 2023
- Venue: Mandalay Bay
- Participants: 9,221

Final positions
- Champions: SF6: Amjad "AngryBird" Al-Shalabi; GGS: William "Leffen" Hjelt; T7: Arslan "Arslan Ash" Siddique; UMVC3: Gabriel "Jibrill" Lam; DBFZ: Jo'siah "Hikari" Miller; KOFXV: Zeng "Xiao Hai" Zhuojun; MBTL: "Moai; MK11U: Jarrad "NinjaKilla" Gooden

Tournament statistics
- Attendance: ~20,000

The 2023 Evolution Championship Series (commonly referred to as Evo 2023 or EVO 2023) was a fighting game event held in Las Vegas from August 5 to 7, 2022 as part of the long-running Evolution Championship Series. The event offered tournaments for various video games, including Guilty Gear Strive, Tekken 7, and Dragon Ball FighterZ. It marks the debut tournament of Street Fighter 6 to the event. With 7,061 unique competitors entering the Street Fighter 6 tournament, it was the fighting tournament with the most participants of all time up to that point.

== Venue ==
For the fifth straight tournament, Evo 2023 was held at the Mandalay Bay resort in Las Vegas again, with the Mandalay Bay Convention Center hosting the first two days and Michelob Ultra Arena hosting the third day for the sixth consecutive tournament.

== Games ==
The lineup was revealed on February 10, 2023. Every game from last year made a return as a mainline game with the exceptions of Skullgirls: 2nd Encore, Granblue Fantasy Versus and Street Fighter V. Street Fighter 6 made its tournament debut this year. The Granblue Fantasy Versus: Rising beta had a tournament as an unofficial entrant sponsored by Cygames. There were also demos for upcoming games Project L, Tekken 8 and Mortal Kombat 1.

== Participants ==
9,221 participants were at Evo 2023, setting an attendance record for the event. Street Fighter 6 had 7,061 competitors, also setting a single tournament record for the event.

== Broadcast ==
As usual, the tournament was streamed on the streaming site Twitch, broadcast across multiple different streams. All official streams were also streamed live on YouTube.

== Reveals ==
Ed Boon revealed a trailer showcasing Reptile, Havik and Ashrah as playable characters to Mortal Kombat 1 as well as Sareena as a Kameo. A teaser trailer was released for new character AKI for Street Fighter 6, with a new set of outfits revealed shortly afterwards. Namco revealed gameplay trailers for returning fighter Raven as well as new character Azucena for Tekken 8. SNK announced the title of Garou 2 as Fatal Fury: City of the Wolves. Arc Systems Works released a trailer for Johnny as well as a roadmap of the Season Pass 3 for Guilty Gear Strive. French Bread announced Under Night In-Birth 2 Sys:Celes with a 2024 release time. Riot Games released a gameplay trailer for Yasuo for Project L.

== Results ==
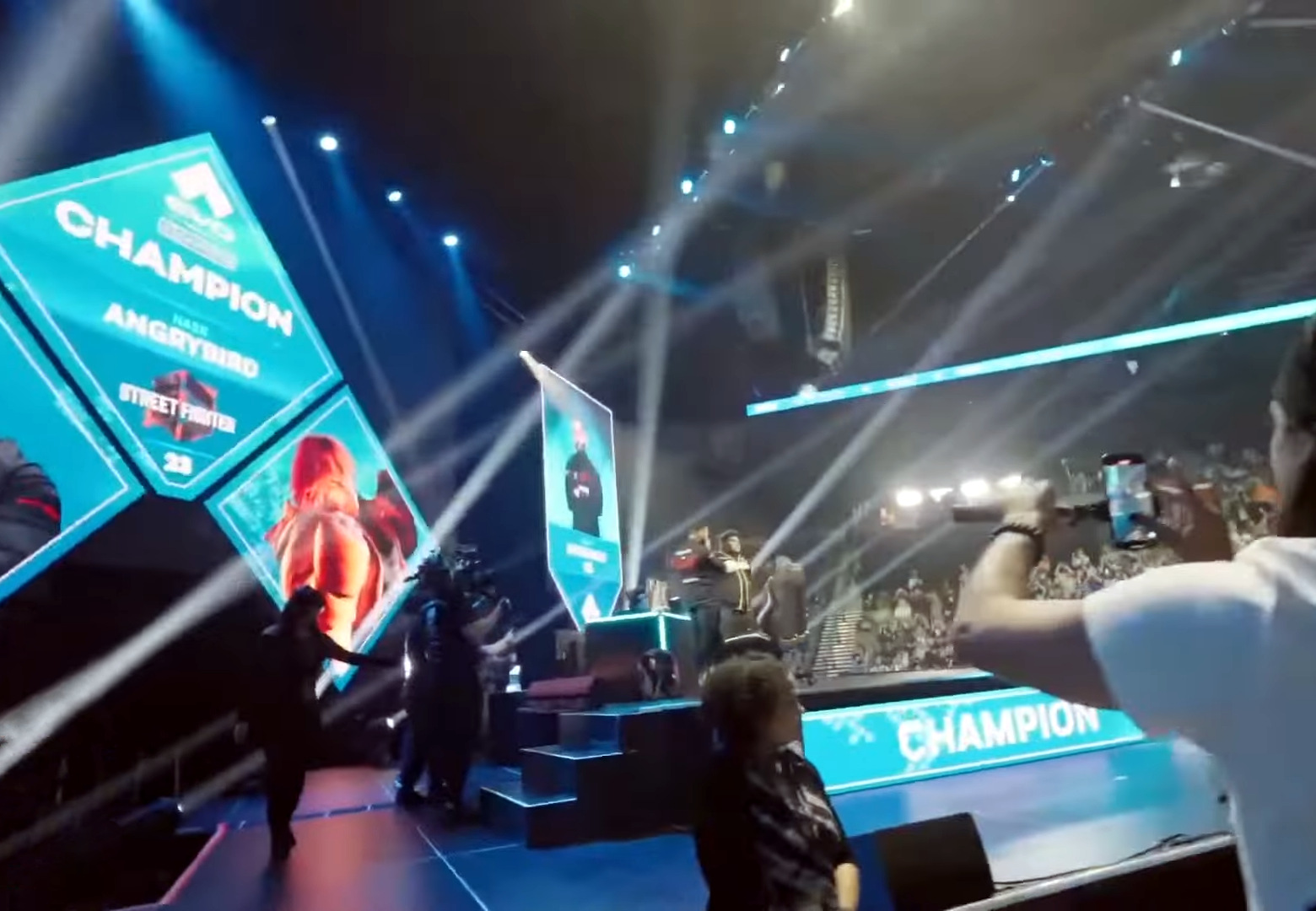
Angrybird won the Street Fighter 6 tournament.

Street Fighter 6
Place	Player	Alias	Character(s)
1st	(United Arab Emirates) Amjad Al-Shalabi	Angrybird	Ken
2nd	(Dominican Republic) Saul Leonardo Mena II	MenaRD	Blanka, Luke
3rd	(United States) Victor Woodley	Punk	Cammy
4th	(Japan) Hajime Taniguchi	Tokido	Ken
5th	(Japan) Tatsuya Haitani	Haitani	Chun-Li
5th	(Japan) unknown	Kakeru	JP
7th	(Japan) Atsushi Fujimura	Fukimura	Ken
7th	(Japan) Naoki Nemoto	Nemo	JP

Guilty Gear Strive
Place	Player	Alias	Character(s)
1st	(Sweden) William Hjelte	Leffen	Happy Chaos
2nd	(United States) Johansson Mattias	NBNHMR	Nagoriyuki
3rd	(South Korea) Kim Jae-won	Daru	I-No
4th	(United States) Claire Harrison	UMISHO	Sol Badguy
5th	(Japan) Shogo Ishimine	Tyurara	Ky Kiske
5th	(Senegal) Ismaila Gueye	Verix	Nagoriyuki
7th	(United Kingdom) Adam Farmer	Setchi	Zato-1
7th	(Israel) Atir Yosef	Zando	Ramlethal

Tekken 7
Place	Player	Alias	Character(s)
1st	(Pakistan) Arslan Siddique	Arslan Ash	Kunimitsu
2nd	(Japan) Akihiro Abe	AO	Kunimitsu
3rd	(South Korea) Lim Soo-hoon	ULSAN	Bob, Feng, Kasumi
4th	(United States) Don Brown	Genghis D0n	Katarina
5th	(South Korea) Oh Dae-il	Meo-IL	Geese
5th	(United States) Hoa Luu	Anakin	King
7th	(United States) Daichi Nakayama	Nobi	Dragunov, Feng
7th	(Philippines) Andreij Albar	Douijn	Negan, Kazumi, Leo, Julia, Leroy

Ultimate Marvel vs Capcom 3
Place	Player	Alias	Character(s)
1st	(United States) Gabriel Lam	Jibrill	Zero/Dante/Vergil
2nd	(United States) Matthew Skuce	Evasion	Zero/Dante/Vergil
3rd	(Chile) Nicolas Gonzalez	Kane Blueriver	Hulk/Sentinel/Haggar
4th	(United States) Adrian Cordova	LiberalTerminator	Nova/Spencer/Doctor Doom
5th	(United States) unknown	Mundank	Nova/Spencer/Magneto
5th	(United Kingdom) unknown	Spartan Throne	Wolverine/Dormammu/Iron Fist
7th	(Japan) Ryota Fukumoto	RF	Morrigan/Doctor Doom/Vergil
7th	(United States) Ethan Escalante	Escalante	Morrigan/Magneto/Doctor Doom

Dragon Ball FighterZ
Place	Player	Alias	Character(s)
1st	(United States) Jo'siah Miller	HIKARI	Blue Gogeta/Vegito/Android 17
2nd	(France) unknown	Yasha	Blue Gogeta/Vegito/Android 17
3rd	(United States) Shamar H.	Nitro	Gotenks/Android 18/Adult Gohan
4th	(Spain) Daniel Gras Llopis	Gropis	Super Baby 2/Frieza/Beerus
5th	(United States) unknown	Garlic Bread	Super Baby 2/Captin Ginyu/Krillin
5th	(United States) unknown	Kite	Lab Coat 21/Base Vegeta/Android 21
7th	(United States) Keyler Heath	KJpixels	Jiren/Frieza/Janemba
7th	(United States) Lenwood Arnold	INZEM	Gotenks/Base Vegeta/Android 18, Jiren/Piccolo/Android 17

King of Fighters XV
Place	Player	Alias	Character(s)
1st	(China) Zeng Zhuojun	Xiaohai	Kyo/B. Jenet/Krohnen, Kyo/Isla/Krohnen
2nd	(Taiwan) Lin Chiahung	E.T.	Isla/B. Janet/Krohnen
3rd	(Japan) unknown	mok	B. Jenet/Luong/Kukri
4th	(Mexico) Agustín Escorcia	Wero Asamiya	Kyo/B. Jenet/Iori
5th	(South Korea) Lee Kwang-no	MadKOF	Geese/Clark/Heidern
5th	(South Korea) Kang Myung-gu	Lacid	Meitenkun/Shermie/Ash
7th	(United States) Eric Eun Ho Kang	FKang	Kyo/Chizuru Kagura/Krohnen, Joe/Chizuru/Krohnen
7th	(Taiwan) Tseng Chia-chen	ZJZ	Nakoruru/Isla/B. Jenet, Chizuru/Isla/B. Jenet

Melty Blood: Type Lumina
Place	Player	Alias	Character(s)
1st	(Japan) unknown	Moai	Michael
2nd	(Japan) Damian Fullbright	DAI	Michael
3rd	(United States) Jimmy Tran	Jimmy Tran	Ciel
4th	(Japan) unknown	Jing	Hisui
5th	(South Korea) Kim Jong-jin	KoreanWrestlingMan	Mario
5th	(Costa Rica) Jose Ballestero	ScrawtVermillion	Komou
7th	(United States) Eli Zhu	Lunar	Dead Apostle Noel
7th	(Japan) unknown	ronde	Shiki

Mortal Kombat 11
Place	Player	Alias	Character(s)
1st	(United States) Jarrad Gooden	Ninjakilla_212	Fujin
2nd	(Chile) Nicolás Martínez	Nicholas	Kotal Khan, Johnny Cage
3rd	(Chile) Matías Martínez	Scorpionprocs	Fujin, Kotal Khan, Johnny Cage
4th	(United Kingdom) Denom Jones	A F0xy Grampa	The Terminator, Sub-Zero, RoboCop, Kitana, Kung Lao
5th	(United States) Daniel Taibot	TheMightyUnjust	Jacqui Briggs, Kano
5th	(United States) Zoulfikar Dayekh	Xombat	Johnny Cage
7th	(United States) Curtis McCall	Rewind	Kano, Kotal Khan, Liu Kang, Johnny Cage
7th	(Austria) Martin T.	MakoraN	Skarlet, Cetrion
