= Latif (gamer) =

Saudi Arabian electronic sports player (born 1989)

- Latif at EVO 2012

Personal information
- Name: Abdullatif Alhmili
- Born: 1989 or 1990 (age 35–36); Khobar City
- Nationality: Saudi Arabia

Current team
- Team: Twisted Minds

Career information
- Games: Guilty Gear; Street Fighter IV Guilty Gear Strive; Street Fighter 6
- Playing career: 2008–2009, 2011-2015, 2021–present

Team history
- 2012–2013: Team Razer

Career highlights and awards
- EVO champion (2009)

Abdullatif Alhmili, better known as Latif, is a Saudi Arabian electronic sports player. Primarily a Guilty Gear and King of Fighters player, Latif competed in the Street Fighter IV tournament at EVO 2011, coming out of nowhere to claim second place. Latif is known for his skill with Street Fighter character Crimson Viper.

== Career ==
Latif grew up in Saudi Arabia playing games such as Guilty Gear using a gamepad. He moved to Austin, Texas in 2007 at the age of 17 in order to study English for a year, before moving to Flagstaff, Arizona to attend Northern Arizona University. Here he found an arcade hall where he managed to beat other players easily despite it being his first time playing with an arcade stick. Latif became more involved with the local fighting game community over time and by 2008, he competed in Final Round 11 despite his parents' disapproval and won the "Guilty Gear Accent Core" tournament. With his parents' approval after his initial success Latif competed at Super Battle Opera in 2009.

Latif didn't like the gameplay of Street Fighter IV when the game was released in 2009, preferring the speed-oriented play style of game franchises like Guilty Gear and King of Fighters. Latif took a hiatus from competing in fighting games, but while watching EVO 2010, he saw Dashio and Uryo play with Crimson Viper and became invested in practicing the character. In an interview with Red Bull, Latif stated that "in 2011, I remember playing eight to nine hours a day. Wake up. Eat. Play, play and play. Sleep. I was still in school so I did this training routine during summers."

Latif made a splash in the Street Fighter scene at Evolution Championship 2011 when, as an underdog, he beat Daigo Umehara and Poongko to claim second place in the tournament. Playing with Crimson Viper, Latif faced off against Fuudo's Fei Long in the finale, but lost all three matches.

In 2012, Latif joined Razer Inc.'s "Razer Academy" project, which was designed to provide an interactive and in-depth learning experience for esports fans. Since the 2011 Evolution Championships, Latif has been able to get into the top 16 twice. He wasn't able to qualify for the 2015 Capcom Cup after losing against Fuudo again in the KO Fighting Game Festival in Kuwait.

Latif left Team Razer in late 2013 and remained a free agent until his break in 2015. In July 2021, Latif announced his return to competition with Guilty Gear Strive.

== Acknowledgements ==
Christian Davis of Device Magazine stated that Latif is known for his "insane" skill at playing with the character Crimson Viper.

== Tournament results ==
=== Guilty Gear XX Accent Core Plus ===
- 1st - EVO 2009

=== Street Fighter IV ===
- 2nd - EVO 2011
- 13th - EVO 2015
