= SonicFox =

American professional esports player (born 1998)

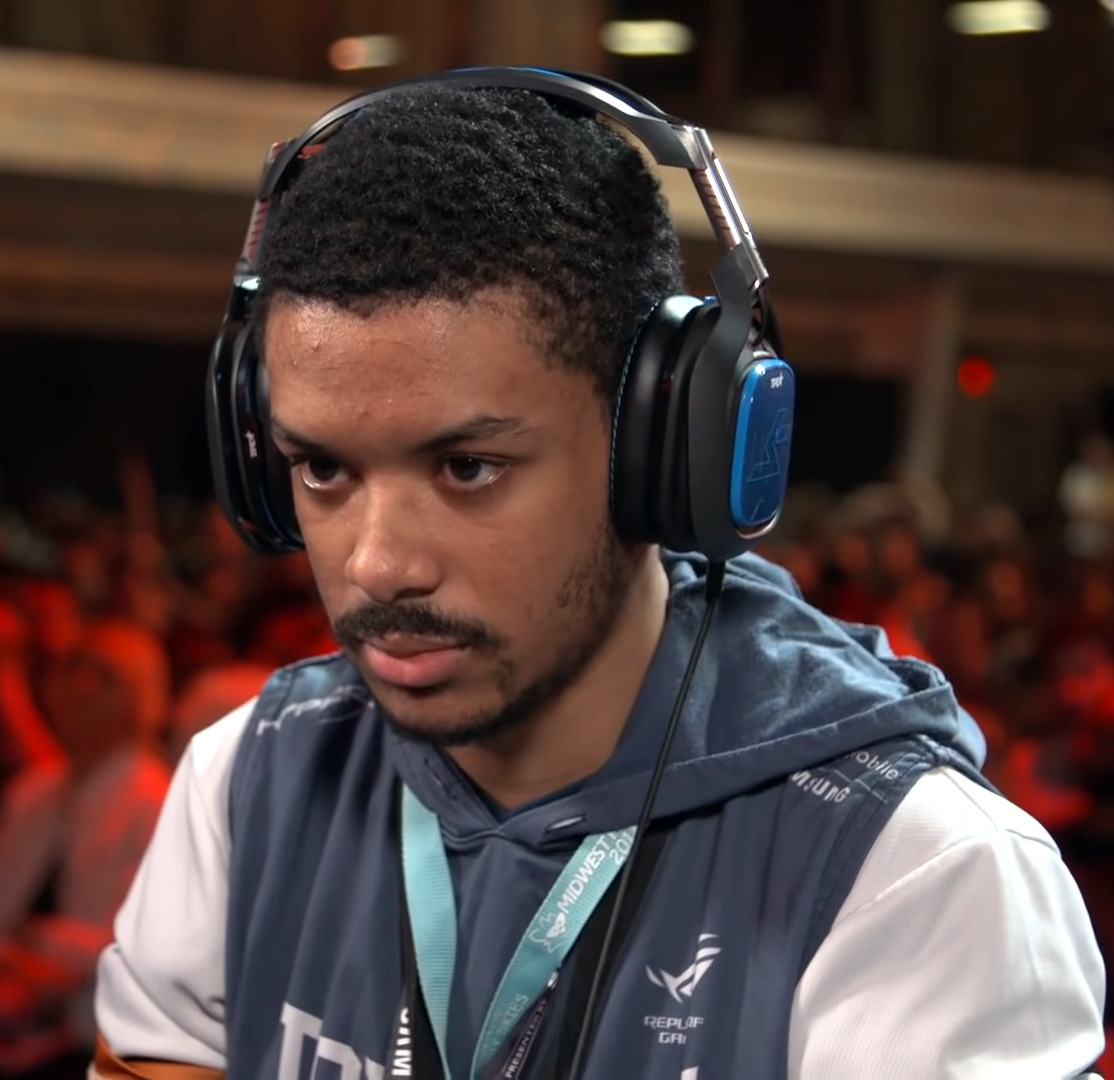
- SonicFox at Combo Breaker 2019

Personal information
- Name: Dominique McLean
- Born: March 2, 1998 (age 28)

Career information
- Games: Mortal Kombat; Injustice: Gods Among Us; Dragon Ball FighterZ
- Playing career: 2012–present

Team history
- 2014–2015: Revolution Gaming
- 2015–2016: Critical Reaction
- 2017–2019: Echo Fox
- 2020–2023: Evil Geniuses
- 2025–present: FlyQuest

Dominique McLean (born March 2, 1998), known professionally as SonicFox, is an American professional esports player of several fighting games, currently signed to FlyQuest. They (Note: McLean uses he/him and they/them pronouns, but reserves the use of he/him for close friends. This article uses they/them for consistency.) have topped many tournaments, including eight Evolution Championship Series (EVO) events for five different game franchises. They are the highest paid fighting game esports player in the world as of August 4, 2019, with over $719,204.94 in earnings. They are famous for wins in Netherrealm Studios games Mortal Kombat and Injustice. McLean was named Esports Player of the Year at The Game Awards 2018 and included in Forbes's 2020 "30 Under 30" for Games.

As a furry, McLean is known to compete in the fursuit of their fursona, a blue-and-white anthropomorphic fox.

== Career ==
McLean's older brother, Christian, got McLean interested in fighting video games when McLean was three years old. Over the next several years, while McLean continued to play games, they came into the furry fandom around the age of ten or eleven, and developed the "SonicFox" character. They are known to participate in tournaments in the fursuit of their fursona, a blue-and-white anthropomorphic fox.

Around 2011, McLean was playing in non-competitive online Mortal Kombat games, and their online friends encouraged them to try their skills at an offline Mortal Kombat tournament in 2012. While McLean only came in ninth at the event, they were enthralled with the competitive atmosphere, and they have continued to participate in various fighting game championships.

McLean achieved a 6–0 victory at the Injustice: Gods Among Us tournament at Evo 2014. News.com.au reported in December 2015 that McLean had not lost a single tournament in the previous 18 months, and that they earned $150,000 USD within the span of two weeks by winning Mortal Kombat tournaments.

McLean was named the "Esports Player of the Year" at The Game Awards 2018 ceremony, earning media attention for their acceptance speech. Forbes included McLean on their 2020 "30 Under 30" in the Games category.

In early 2020, SonicFox signed with the fighting games division of the esports team Evil Geniuses. SonicFox was added as a background character in Skullgirls later that year. They announced their departure from Evil Geniuses in late 2023.

In December 2023, SonicFox was added as a Chess.com bot in the featured "Creators" category that players can compete against. The bot's in-game avatar is of their anthropomorphic fox fursona and is "no stranger to some trash talk", as stated in the official announcement of the new bot.

In December 2025, SonicFox would sign with the fighting games division of FlyQuest.

== Personal life ==
McLean was raised in Townsend, Delaware, but is from New Jersey. As of 2018, McLean was a student at the New York Institute of Technology. McLean chose to focus on academics while still maintaining a balance between their professional gaming and school life. McLean is openly gay. In September 2019, McLean came out on Twitter as non-binary. McLean publicly uses they/them pronouns, reserving use of he/him only for those to whom they are close, in order to help normalize the use of singular they.
