= Xiaohai =

Chinese streamer and esports player (born 1989)

Personal information
- Name: 曾卓君 (Zeng Zhuojun)
- Born: 26 April 1989 (age 37); Guangdong, China

Career information
- Games: The King of Fighters; Fatal Fury; Street Fighter; Samurai Shodown; Dragon Ball FighterZ; Sailor Moon
- Playing career: 2007–present

Team history
- 2024–2025: KuaiShou Gaming
- 2025–present: Team Falcons

Career highlights and awards
- The King of Fighters: 3× EVO Las Vegas champion (2014, 2023, 2024); EVO Japan champion (2023); EVO France champion (2026); SBO champion (2007); Street Fighter: 2× Esports World Cup champion (2024, 2025); Fatal Fury: 2× EVO Japan champion (2025, 2026); EVO France champion (2025); EVO Las Vegas champion (2026)

Chinese name
- Traditional Chinese: 曾卓君
- Simplified Chinese: 曾卓君
Transcriptions
Standard Mandarin
- Hanyu Pinyin: Zēng Zhuójūn
Yue: Cantonese
- Jyutping: zang1 coek3 gwan1

Bilibili information
- Channel: 小孩曾卓君
- Years active: 2017–present
- Genre: Gaming
- Followers: 685,419
- Last updated: 2 March 2026

Zeng Zhuojun (Chinese: 曾卓君; pinyin: Zēng Zhuójūn; Jyutping: Zang1 Coek3 Gwan1; born 26 April 1989), better known as Xiaohai, is a Chinese professional fighting game player and streamer. He is widely considered one of the greatest fighting game players of all time, winning total prize money worth around 500,000.00-600,000.00 USD in 2024, with half of the wins coming from only one tournament win in Street Fighter 6, which set an esports record. He has since defended this 2024 Street Fighter 6 win and won US$250,000.00 again the next year, further increasing his earnings. He is acclaimed as the greatest and most successful player in the history of The King of Fighters (KOF), having dominated the franchise's competition across many different eras and titles. He is one of the few players who have won the Evolution Championship Series seven times in the main tourney, as well as two Tier-1 official SNK-sponsored side events，including Fatal Fury: City of the Wolves at Evo Japan 2025 and The King of Fighters XV at Evo France 2026. He also won in his debut worldwide tournament at the 2007 Super Battle Opera for The King of Fighters '98 at the age of 18.

== Early life ==
Zeng was born on 26 April 1989, in the province of Guangdong, China and grew up in the city of Guangzhou. He took an interest in fighting games at the early age of 6 after a visit to the Guangzhou arcades with his father, and started to seriously compete after that. He won his first tournament in Hangzhou at the age of 10 playing The King of Fighters, then won another tournament in Guangzhou at the age of 12. By age 18, he joined the Super Battle Opera tournament in Japan, which was his first major international tournament, and won in his debut for The King of Fighters '98.

== Professional career ==
After winning the Super Battle Opera, Xiaohai began competing in tournaments in the United States and around the world. He won his first EVO tournament in 2014 at the age of 25 for The King of Fighters XIII, which he has called his favorite game. He gradually emerged as a notable player in Street Fighter since Street Fighter IV and was labeled as one of its best bets for winning major tournaments by ESPN.

After his fourth EVO championship victory in KOF and simultaneous ninth-place finish in Street Fighter 6 at the Evo 2023, Xiao Hai completely narrowed down his focus into Street Fighter 6 in preparation for the first major Street Fighter World Cup for the title in 2024. There, he convincingly beat Dual Kevin and Zhen in the First Phase, then eliminated Problem X and NoahTheProdigy from competition before moving into the Final Phase. At the final phase, he beat Hikaru in a nail-biter set to advance the tournament finals, where he won against the Japanese player Kawano.

During the 2025 Esports World Cup, 36-year-old Xiao Hai defeated 15-year-old Chilean player Blaz 5–4 in Street Fighter 6 to claim the championship, becoming the first player (including teams) in EWC history to successfully defend a title. He also placed 2nd in Fatal Fury: City of the Wolves, nearly beating Japanese player GO1.

== Honors ==
Xiaohai was inducted into the Esports Hall of Fame in China.He won the Esports Controller Player of the Year in 2025 at the Esports Awards, becoming the first fighting game player in history to receive an Esports Awards title.

== Public image ==
Xiaohai won tournaments at a young age against older competitors, hence the player ID "Xiaohai" was adopted, which means "child" in Chinese. Xiaohai is well known for competing in tournaments with only one hand, his left hand, on the arcade controller. He is known for his neutral game, and for opening the door to more Asian competitors in fighting games. Gamer Justin Wong has gone on to say that his biggest one-sided defeat was in a match in The King of Fighters XV against Xiaohai in 2025. Xiaohai mainly plays on the QANBA-sponsored controller for his tournaments.

He is widely considered the greatest player of all time in The King of Fighters, and one of the greatest players in many fighting games, such as Street Fighter.

== Personal life ==
Xiaohai maintains his residency in Shanghai, China. He is married to Elena Zeng, who often accompanies him in tournaments.
