= ELeague Street Fighter V Invitational =

Esports league season

ELEAGUE
- 2017

Tournament information
- Sport: Street Fighter V
- Location: Atlanta, Georgia, United States
- Dates: March 27, 2017–May 26, 2017
- Administrator: Turner Sports; William Morris Endeavor
- Tournament format(s): Group Stage; Double-Elimination Bracket
- Venue: Turner Studios
- Teams: 32 players
- Purse: $250,000 USD

Final positions
- Champion: Victor "Punk" Woodley
- 1st runner-up: Arman "Phenom" Hanjani
- 2nd runner-up: Keita "Fuudo" Ai

ELEAGUE Street Fighter V Invitational, also known as ELEAGUE Season 3, was the third season of ELEAGUE. After two seasons with Counter-Strike: Global Offensive, the league announced that it would expand to fighting games with Street Fighter V. The season ran from March 27, 2017, to May 26, 2017, and was broadcast on cable television on TBS and online on Twitch. The season featured 32 players overall and 24 players in the main tournament from across the world to compete.

The third season of ELEAGUE started with Victor "Punk" Woodley defeating Bryant "Smug" Huggin 2–0 in a best of three. The official season began with Smug defeating Julio Fuentes 3–0 in a best of five series. The season concluded with Punk defeating Arman "Phenom" Hanjani 4–2 in a best of seven series to take home US$150,000 of the US$250,000 prize pool.

== Format ==
ELEAGUE will invite thirty-two players from around the world to compete in the tournament. Sixteen of the players will be invited based on their 2016 Capcom Pro Tour results and the other sixteen will receive invites from Capcom. This stage will be the preliminaries. Players will be separated into four groups of eight. The top six players from each group will advance to the regular season. All matches will be best of three. This will run from March 27, 2017, to March 30, 2017.

Twenty-four players will play in the regular season. They will be divided into four groups of six. There will be two phases in the regular season. The top two players from the preliminaries will automatically advance to the second phase. The other four players will play in a group stage robin round. The third seed and the sixth seed will play each other and the fourth and fifth seeds will play each other in the initial matches. The two losers and the two winners will then play each other. The winner of the winner's map will move on to phase two and the loser of the loser's matches will be eliminated. The decider match between the two remaining players will determine which player moves to the second phase and which player gets eliminated. In phase two, the remaining four players will play in a single elimination, best of five bracket. The winners of the matches will move on to the playoffs.

Eight players remain as they head to the playoffs. The winners of the groups will be placed in the upper bracket and the runners-up of the groups will be placed in the lower bracket. Players will play in an eight-man double-elimination bracket, meaning a loss from a player in the upper bracket is still alive, but heads into the lower bracket. Once a player loses in the lower bracket, that player is eliminated from the tournament. The players will continue to play until a winner is decided. All matches will be best of five. The playoffs will all take place on May 26.

== Players competing ==
The thirty-two players competing in the tournament are as follows:

- CYG | Daigo Umehara
- GRPT | Fuudo
- ZW | GamerBee
- RZR | Infiltration
- FOX | Julio Fuentes
- FOX | Justin Wong
- FOX | Momochi
- GRPT | MOV
- Liquid'NuckleDu
- BX3 | Phenom
- FOX | Tokido
- Qanba | Xiao Hai
- F3 | Brolynho
- GW | Eita
- SPY | Fchamp
- RB | Luffy
- LU | Alex Valle
- DNL | Chris Tatarian
- Gllty
- Gootecks
- EG | K-Brad
- LI Joe
- Circa | LPN
- RISE | Marn
- CYG | PR Balrog
- PG | Punk
- EG | Ricki Ortiz
- Ryan Hart
- PIE | Smug
- CYG | Snake Eyez
- Wolfkrone
- RZR | Xian

== Broadcast talent ==
Host

- Richard Lewis

Commentators/Analysts

- Zhi Liang Chew
- Stephen "Sajam" Lyon
- Reepal "Rip" Parbhoo
- Steve "Tasty Steve" Scott

Interviewer

- Malik Fortè

== Preliminaries (March 27–30, 2017) ==
The preliminary groups were announced on March 2, 2017. There are four groups of eight players and six players from each group move on to the regular season.

=== Group A (March 27th) ===
Seed	Player	Record	W-L
1	PG | Punk	6–1	12–4
2	FOX | Momochi	5–2	12–6
3	PIE | Smug	5–2	11–4
4	F3 | Brolynho	4–3	8–9
5	RZR | Infiltration	4–3	10–6
6	FOX | Julio Fuentes	2–5	6–12
7	RISE | Marn	2–5	5–11
8	EG | Ricki Ortiz	0–7	2–14

Group A Results

Player	Character(s)	Score	Score	Character(s)	Player
Smug	Balrog	0	2	Karin	Punk
Marn	Ibuki	1	2	Ken	Julio Fuentes
Infiltration	Rashid	1	2	Necalli; Ibuki	Brolynho
Momochi	Ken	2	0	Chun-Li	Ricki Ortiz
Julio Fuentes	Ken	0	2	Balrog	Smug
Infiltration	Juri	2	0	Karin	Punk
Ricki Ortiz	R.Mika	0	2	R. Mika	Marn
Smug	Balrog	2	0	Necalli	Brolynho
Punk	Karin	2	1	Ken	Momochi
Julio Fuentes	Ken	2	1	Chun-Li	Ricki Ortiz
Infiltration	Juri	0	2	Balrog	Smug
Marn	Ibuki	2	1	Ken	Momochi
Ricki Ortiz	Chun-Li	1	2	Necalli	Brolynho
Punk	Karin	2	1	Ken	Julio Fuentes
Momochi	Ken	2	1	Balrog	Smug
Infiltration	Juri	2	0	Chun-Li; Cammy	Ricki Ortiz
Punk	Karin	2	0	Ibuki	Marn
Brolynho	Necalli	0	2	Ken	Momochi
Infiltration	Rashid	2	0	Ken	Julio Fuentes
Marn	Ibuki	0	2	Balrog	Smug
Brolynho	Necalli	1	2	Karin	Punk
Momochi	Ken	2	0	Ken	Julio Fuentes
Smug	Balrog	2	0	Chun-Li	Ricki Ortiz
Infiltration	Juri	2	0	Ibuki	Marn
Ricki Ortiz	Chun-Li	0	2	Nash	Punk
Infiltration	Rashid	1	2	Ken	Momochi
Brolynho	Necalli	2	0	Ibuki	Marn

=== Group B (March 28th) ===
Seed	Player	Record	W-L
1	CYG | PR Balrog	6–1	13–4
2	CYG | Snake Eyez	5–2	12–6
3	GW | Eita	4–3	10–9
4	ZW | GamerBee	4–3	10–8
5	FOX | Justin Wong	3–4	9–9
6	CYG | Daigo Umehara	3–4	6–10
7	LU | Alex Valle	3–4	8–10
8	Gllty	0–7	2–16

Group B Results

Player	Character(s)	Score	Score	Character(s)	Player
Gllty	Dhalsim	0	2	Akuma	Snake Eyes
GamerBee	Necalli	2	1	Rashid	Alex Valle
Justin Wong	Karin	1	2	Ken	Eita
PR Balrog	Balrog	2	0	Guile	Daigo Umehara
Gllty	Dhalsim	0	2	Necalli	GamerBee
Justin Wong	Karin	0	2	Akuma	Snake Eyez
Alex Valle	Rashid	0	2	Balrog	PR Balrog
Gllty	Dhalsim	1	2	Ken	Eita
Daigo Umehara	Guile	2	1	Akuma	Snake Eyez
GamerBee	Cammy	0	2	Balrog	PR Balrog
Justin Wong	Karin	2	0	Dhalsim	Gllty
Alex Valle	Rashid	0	2	Guile	Daigo Umehara
PR Balrog	Balrog	2	1	Ken	Eita
Snake Eyez	Zangief	2	1	Necalli	GamerBee
Daigo Umehara	Guile	2	1	Dhalsim	Gllty
Justin Wong	Karin	1	2	Balrog	PR Balrog
Snake Eyez	Zangief	1	2	Rashid	Alex Valle
Daigo Umehara	Guile	0	2	Ken	Eita
Justin Wong	Karin	1	2	Necalli	GamerBee
Alex Valle	Rashid	2	0	Dhalsim	Gllty
Snake Eyez	Zangief	2	0	Ken	Eita
GamerBee	Necalli	2	0	Guile	Daigo Umehara
PR Balrog	Balrog	2	0	Kolin; Dhalsim	Gllty
Justin Wong	Karin	2	1	Rashid	Alex Valle
Eita	Ken	2	1	Necalli	GamerBee
PR Balrog	Balrog	1	2	Zangief	Snake Eyez
Justin Wong	Karin	2	0	Guile	Daigo Umehara
Eita	Ken	1	2	Rashid	Alex Valle

=== Group C (March 29th) ===
Seed	Player	Record	W-L
1	Wolfkrone	6–1	13–5
2	GRPT | Fuudo	6–1	12–4
3	RZR | Xian	5–2	11–6
4	SPY | Fchamp	4–3	9–6
5	GRPT | MOV	3–4	7–10
6	FOX | Tokido	3–4	11–9
7	EG | K-Brad	1–5	5–13
8	Gootecks	0–7	1–15

Group C Results

Player	Character(s)	Score	Score	Character(s)	Player
K-Brad	Cammy	2	1	Urien	Gootecks
Wolfkrone	Laura	2	1	R. Mika	Fuudo
Tokido	Akuma	1	2	Dhalsim	Fchamp
Xian	Ibuki	2	1	Chun-Li	MOV
Gootecks	Urien	0	2	R. Mika	Fuudo
Tokido	Akuma	2	1	Cammy	K-Brad
Wolfkrone	Laura	1	2	Ibuki	Xian
Gootecks	Urien	0	2	Dhalsim	Fchamp
K-Brad	Cammy	0	2	Chun-Li	MOV
Fuudo	R. Mika	2	0	Ibuki	Xian
Tokido	Akuma	2	0	Urien	Gootecks
MOV	Chun-Li	1	2	Laura	Wolfkrone
Fchamp	Dhalsim	0	2	Ibuki	Xian
Fuudo	R. Mika	2	1	Cammy	K-Brad
MOV	Chun-Li	2	0	Urien	Gootecks
Tokido	Akuma	2	1	Ibuki	Xian
K-Brad	Cammy	1	2	Laura	Wolfkrone
MOV	Chun-Li	0	2	Dahlsim	Fchamp
Fuudo	R. Mika	2	0	Akuma	Tokido
Gootecks	Urien	0	2	Laura	Wolfkrone
Fchamp	Dhalsim	2	0	Cammy	K-Brad
Fuudo	R. Mika	2	0	Chun-Li	MOV
Xian	Ibuki	2	0	Urien	Gootecks
Tokido	Akuma	0	2	Laura	Wolfkrone
Fchamp	Dhalsim	1	2	R. Mika	Fuudo
Xian	Ibuki	2	0	Cammy	K-Brad
Tokido	Akuma	1	2	Chun-Li	MOV
Fchamp	Dhalsim	0	2	Laura	Wolfkrone

=== Group D (March 30th) ===
Seed	Player	Record	W-L
1	Liquid'NuckleDu	6–1	13–4
2	BX3 | Phenom	5–2	12–7
3	RB | Luffy	5–2	11–5
4	Qanba | Xiao Hai	4–3	10–10
5	DNL | Chris Tatarian	3–4	7–9
6	Ryan Hart	3–4	8–10
7	Circa | LPN	2–5	6–10
8	LI Joe	0–7	2–14

Group D Results

Player	Character(s)	Score	Score	Character(s)	Player
Ryan Hart	Urien; Ken	0	2	M. Bison	LPN
Xiao Hai	Cammy	2	0	Urien	LI Joe
NuckleDu	Guile	2	0	R. Mika	Luffy
Phenom	Necalli	2	0	Ken	Chris Tatarian
Xiao Hai	Cammy	2	1	Kolin; Urien	LPN
NuckleDu	Guile	2	0	Ken	Ryan Hart
Chris Tatarian	Ken	2	0	Urien	LI Joe
Luffy	R. Mika	2	0	Urien	LPN
Phenom	Necalli	1	2	Urien	Ryan Hart
Xiao Hai	Cammy	2	1	Ken	Chris Tatarian
NuckleDu	Guile; R. Mika	2	1	M. Bison; Kolin	LPN
Phenom	Necalli	2	1	Urien	LI Joe
Luffy	R. Mika	2	0	Ken	Chris Tatarian
Xiao Hai	Cammy	1	2	Urien	Ryan Hart
Phenom	Necalli	2	0	Urien	LPN
NuckleDu	Guile	2	0	Cammy	Chris Tatarian
Ryan Hart	Guile	2	0	Urien	LI Joe
Luffy	R. Mika	1	2	Necalli	Phenom
NuckleDu	Guile	2	0	Cammy	Xiao Hai
LPN	Urien	2	0	M. Bison	LI Joe
Luffy	R. Mika	2	1	Urien	Ryan Hart
Xiao Hai	Cammy	2	1	Necalli	Phenom
Chris Tatarian	Ken	2	0	Birdie	LPN
NuckleDu	Guile	2	0	Nash	LI Joe
Xiao Hai	Cammy	0	2	R. Mika	Luffy
Chris Tatarian	Ken	2	1	Urien	Ryan Hart
NuckleDu	Guile	1	2	Necalli	Phenom
Luffy	R. Mika	2	0	Urien	LI Joe

== Regular Season (April 7 – May 12, 2017) ==
=== Group A (April 7th) ===
==== Phase One ====
Upper round 1
PIE | Smug	3
FOX | Julio Fuentes	0
F3 | Brolynho	1
RZR | Infiltration	3
Lower round 1
FOX | Julio Fuentes	1
F3 | Brolynho	3

Upper final
PIE | Smug	3
RZR | Infiltration	0
Lower final
RZR | Infiltration	0
F3 | Brolynho	3

Qualified for Phase 2
PIE | Smug
F3 | Brolynho

Group A Phase One Results

Group A Phase One Results
Player	Character(s)	Score	Score	Character(s)	Player
PIE | Smug	Balrog	3	0	Ken	FOX | Julio Fuentes
F3 | Brolynho	Necalli	1	3	Juri	RZR | Infiltration
PIE | Smug	Balrog	3	0	Juri	RZR | Infiltration
F3 | Brolynho	Necalli	3	1	Ken	FOX | Julio Fuentes
RZR | Infiltration	Juri	0	3	Necalli	F3 | Brolynho

==== Phase Two ====
Upper round 1
PG | Punk	3
F3 | Brolynho	1
FOX | Momochi	0
PIE | Smug	3
Lower round 1
F3 | Brolynho	0
FOX | Momochi	3

Upper final
PG | Punk	3
PIE | Smug	2
Lower final
PIE | Smug	0
FOX | Momochi	3

Qualified for Playoffs
PG | Punk
FOX | Momochi

Group A Phase Two Results

Group A Phase Two Results
Player	Character(s)	Score	Score	Character(s)	Player
PG | Punk	Karin	3	1	Necalli	F3 | Brolynho
FOX | Momochi	Ibuki	0	3	Balrog	PIE | Smug
PG | Punk	Karin	3	2	Balrog	PIE | Smug
FOX | Momochi	Ken	3	0	Necalli	F3 | Brolynho
PIE | Smug	Balrog	0	3	Ibuki	FOX | Momochi

=== Group B (April 21st) ===
==== Phase One ====
Upper round 1
GW | Eita	0
CYG | Daigo Umehara	3
ZW | GamerBee	3
FOX | Justin Wong	0
Lower round 1
GW | Eita	3
FOX | Justin Wong	0

Upper final
CYG | Daigo Umehara	3
ZW | GamerBee	1
Lower final
ZW | GamerBee	0
GW | Eita	3

Qualified for Phase 2
CYG | Daigo Umehara
GW | Eita

Group B Phase One Results

Group B Phase One Results
Player	Character(s)	Score	Score	Character(s)	Player
GW | Eita	Ken	0	3	Guile	CYG | Daigo Umehara
ZW | GamerBee	Necalli	3	0	Karin	FOX | Justin Wong
CYG | Daigo Umehara	Guile	3	1	Necalli	ZW | GamerBee
GW | Eita	Ken	3	0	Karin	FOX | Justin Wong
ZW | GamerBee	Necalli	0	3	Ken	GW | Eita

==== Phase Two ====
Upper round 1
CYG | Snake Eyez	0
CYG | Daigo Umehara	3
CYG | PR Balrog	3
GW | Eita	1
Lower round 1
CYG | Snake Eyez	1
GW | Eita	3

Upper final
CYG | Daigo Umehara	1
CYG | PR Balrog	3
Lower final
CYG | Daigo Umehara	3
GW | Eita	2

Qualified for Playoffs
CYG | PR Balrog
CYG | Daigo Umehara

Group B Phase Two Results

Group B Phase Two Results
Player	Character(s)	Score	Score	Character(s)	Player
CYG | PR Balrog	Balrog	3	1	Ken	GW | Eita
CYG | Snake Eyez	Akuma	0	3	Guile	CYG | Daigo Umehara
CYG | Daigo Umehara	Guile	1	3	Balrog	CYG | PR Balrog
CYG | Snake Eyez	Zangief	1	3	Ken	GW | Eita
CYG | Daigo Umehara	Guile	3	2	Ken	GW | Eita

=== Group C (May 5th) ===
==== Phase One ====
Upper round 1
RZR | Xian	2
FOX | Tokido	3
SPY | Fchamp	3
GRPT | MOV	0
Lower round 1
RZR | Xian	3
GRPT | MOV	1

Upper final
FOX | Tokido	3
SPY | Fchamp	1
Lower final
SPY | Fchamp	2
RZR | Xian	3

Qualified for Phase 2
FOX | Tokido
RZR | Xian

Group C Phase One Results

Group C Phase One Results
Player	Character(s)	Score	Score	Character(s)	Player
RZR | Xian	Ibuki	2	3	Akuma	FOX | Tokido
SPY | Fchamp	Dhalsim	3	0	Chun-Li	GRPT | MOV
FOX | Tokido	Akuma	3	1	Dhalsim	SPY | Fchamp
RZR | Xian	Ibuki	3	1	Chun-Li	GRPT | MOV
SPY | Fchamp	Dhalsim	2	3	Ibuki	RZR | Xian

==== Phase Two ====
Upper round 1
GRPT | Fuudo	3
FOX | Tokido	1
Wolfkrone	2
RZR | Xian	3
Lower round 1
FOX | Tokido	0
Wolfkrone	3

Upper final
GRPT | Fuudo	3
RZR | Xian	2
Lower final
RZR | Xian	2
Wolfkrone	3

Qualified for Playoffs
GRPT | Fuudo
Wolfkrone

Group C Phase Two Results

Group C Phase Two Results
Player	Character(s)	Score	Score	Character(s)	Player
Wolfkrone	Laura	2	3	Ibuki	RZR | Xian
GRPT | Fuudo	R. Mika	3	1	Akuma	FOX | Tokido
GRPT | Fuudo	R. Mika	3	2	Ibuki	RZR | Xian
Wolfkrone	Laura	3	0	Akuma	FOX | Tokido
RZR | Xian	Ibuki	2	3	Laura	Wolfkrone

=== Group D (May 12th) ===
==== Phase One ====
Upper round 1
RB | Luffy	3
Ryan Hart	1
DNL | Chris Tatarian	3
Qanba | Xiao Hai	2
Lower round 1
Ryan Hart	1
Qanba | Xiao Hai	3

Upper final
RB | Luffy	2
DNL | Chris Tatarian	3
Lower final
RB | Luffy	1
Qanba | Xiao Hai	3

Qualified for Phase 2
DNL | Chris Tatarian
Qanba | Xiao Hai

Group D Phase One Results

Group D Phase One Results
Player	Character(s)	Score	Score	Character(s)	Player
RB | Luffy	R. Mika	3	1	Guile	Ryan Hart
DNL | Chris Tatarian	Ken	3	2	Cammy	Qanba | Xiao Hai
RB | Luffy	R. Mika	2	3	Ken	DNL | Chris Tatarian
Ryan Hart	Urien, Guile	1	3	Cammy	Qanba | Xiao Hai
RB | Luffy	R. Mika	1	3	Cammy	Qanba | Xiao Hai

==== Phase Two ====
Upper round 1
BX3 | Phenom	3
DNL | Chris Tatarian	1
Liquid'NuckleDu	1
Qanba | Xiao Hai	3
Lower round 1
Liquid'NuckleDu	3
DNL | Chris Tatarian	1

Upper final
BX3 | Phenom	3
Qanba | Xiao Hai	0
Lower final
Qanba | Xiao Hai	3
Liquid'NuckleDu	1

Qualified for Playoffs
BX3 | Phenom
Qanba | Xiao Hai

Group D Phase Two Results

Group D Phase Two Results
Player	Character(s)	Score	Score	Character(s)	Player
Liquid'KnuckleDu	Guile, R. Mika	1	3	Cammy	Qanba | Xiao Hai
BX3 | Phenom	Necalli	3	1	Ken	DNL | Chris Tatarian
BX3 | Phenom	Necalli	3	0	Cammy	Qanba | Xiao Hai
DNL | Chris Tatarian	Ken	1	3	Guile	Liquid'KnuckleDu
Qanba | Xiao Hai	Cammy	3	1	Guile, R. Mika	Liquid'KnuckleDu

== Playoffs (May 26th, 2017) ==
Winner's Semifinals	Winner's Finals	Grand Finals
PG | Punk	3
CYG | PR Balrog	0
PG | Punk	1
BX3 | Phenom	3
GRPT | Fuudo	0
BX3 | Phenom	3
BX3 | Phenom	2
PG | Punk	4
Loser's Round 1	Loser's Quarterfinals	Loser's Semifinals	Loser's Finals
GRPT | Fuudo	3
FOX | Momochi	3	FOX | Momochi	0	PG | Punk	3
CYG | Daigo Umehara	1	GRPT | Fuudo	3	GRPT | Fuudo	2
CYG | PR Balrog	2
CYG | PR Balrog	3
Wolfkrone	2	Qanba | Xiao Hai	2
Qanba | Xiao Hai	3

== Final standings ==
Final Standings
Place	Prize Money	Player
1st	US$150,000	PG | Punk
2nd	US$40,000	BX3 | Phenom
3rd	US$20,000	GRPT | Fuudo
4th	US$12,000	CYG | PR Balrog
5th – 6th	US$5,000	Qanba | Xiao Hai
5th – 6th	US$5,000	FOX | Momochi
7th – 8th	US$3,000	Wolfkrone
7th – 8th	US$3,000	CYG | Daigo Umehara
9th – 12th	US$1,000	PIE | Smug
9th – 12th	US$1,000	GW | Eita
9th – 12th	US$1,000	RZR | Xian
9th – 12th	US$1,000	Liquid'KnuckleDu
13th – 16th	US$1,000	F3 | Brolynho
13th – 16th	US$1,000	CYG | Snake Eyez
13th – 16th	US$1,000	FOX | Tokido
13th – 16th	US$1,000	DNL | Chris Tatarian
17th – 20th	US$500	RZR | Infiltration
17th – 20th	US$500	ZW | GamerBee
17th – 20th	US$500	SPY | Fchamp
17th – 20th	US$500	RB | Luffy
21st – 24th	US$500	FOX | Julio Fuentes
21st – 24th	US$500	FOX | Justin Wong
21st – 24th	US$500	GRPT | MOV
21st – 24th	US$500	Ryan Hart
25th – 28th	US$0	RISE | Marn
25th – 28th	US$0	LU | Alex Valle
25th – 28th	US$0	EG | K-Brad
25th – 28th	US$0	Circa | LPN
29th – 32nd	US$0	EG | Ricki Ortiz
29th – 32nd	US$0	Gllty
29th – 32nd	US$0	Gootecks
29th – 32nd	US$0	LI Joe
