= Final Round 20 =

Esports event

- 2017

Tournament information
- Sport: Street Fighter V
- Location: Atlanta, Georgia
- Dates: March 10–12
- Tournament format(s): Double elimination

Final positions
- Champion: Kun Xian Ho
- Runner-up: Fuudo

Final Round 20 or Final Round XX was a fighting game event that took place in Atlanta on March 10–12, 2017. Being the first of the eleven Street Fighter V Premier Events of the 2017 Capcom Pro Tour, the winner of the tournament automatically qualified for the Capcom Cup in December 2017. The event also hosted an Ultimate Marvel vs. Capcom 3 tournament after the game was absent in 2016, and the first major For Honor tournament.

== Background ==
Final Round 20 took place on March 10–12 in Atlanta, Georgia and featured various fighting game tournaments. As staff and participants of Final Round 19 encountered issues regarding the size of the venue, Final Round was held in a 37,500 square foot exhibit hall, with all games being played in one room. Online registration for the event was handled by Smash.gg.

In celebration of its 20th anniversary, Final Round hosted an Ultimate Marvel vs. Capcom 3 tournament, which was absent in the previous year due to the game's lack of popularity. After a "somber" display of the game at Evo 2016, Capcom and its community of fans worked to get Marvel vs Capcom back in the spotlights, resulting the Curleh Circuit, a series of fighting game events Final Round is part of. Final Round also hosted the first tournament of the 2017 Capcom Pro Tour, and thus kicked off the second season for Street Fighter V. The tournament attracted a large variation of international talent – among which Fuudo, Yusuke Momochi, and Capcom Cup 2016 champion NuckleDu – as its winner would take a sizable advantage for the rest of the season. Final Round 20 was the first major event to hold a For Honor tournament. Competitors played Ubisoft's open world fighting game, which was released one month prior, in two-versus-two matches.

== Street Fighter V tournament summary ==
Final Round 20 continued the rivalry between Joshua "Wolfkrone" Philpot and Kenneth "KBrad" Bradley, which started at Frosty Faustings two months earlier when Wolfkrone harshly taunted KBrad after winning 2–1. Both players had won their respective pools when they met in the winner's bracket of the top 64. KBrad defeated Wolfkrone 2–0, not losing a single round during their matches, followed by KBRad literally putting his head inches in front of his opponent's face while the crowd went wild. KBrad eventually took fourth place in the finals, while, Wolfkrone came in at 13.

The top 8 featured a larger variation of characters than usual, as the metagame was still catching up with the gameplay changes of the new season. Three players made a comeback by finishing in the top 8, two of them being Hiromiki "Itabashi Zangief" Kumada and Gustavo "801 Strider" Romero. The third was Kun Xian Ho, who dominated the tournament with Ibuki and defeated Fuudo's R. Mika in the grand finals. Xian became known for playing the low-tier character F.A.N.G., having told Compete that he "never think[s] about high or low tier [but instead] like[s] playing characters that look cool and hype." When Ibuki was introduced in Street Fighter V around the end of the 2016 Capcom Pro Tour, Xian was looking to change his game, noting that he "had some matchups I just couldn't figure out." Some fans have speculated that Xian was only able to win the stacked tournament by switching to a mid-tier character.

== BlazBlue upset ==
During the pool play finals of Final Round 20's BlazBlue: Central Fiction tournament, low-seeded player Glyn "Doza" Mendoza defeated top-seeded Japanese player and Evo 2014 finalist Ryo "Dogura" Nozaki. When Dogura offered Doza a handshake, Doza initially turned it down, thinking their winners finals set was supposed to go to three wins rather than two. After asking tournament organizers for confirmation multiple times, Doza jumped out of his chair, enthusiastically celebrated with his friends, and accepted Dogura's handshake. Video footage of this scene went viral. Dogura went on to win the tournament, while Doza landed on fifth place.
