= Capcom Cup 2014 =

Fighting game tournament

- 2014
- Logo

Tournament information
- Sport: Ultra Street Fighter IV
- Location: San Francisco, California
- Date: December 13
- Tournament format: Double-elimination
- Venue: The Warfield
- Participants: 16
- Purse: ~$36,000

Final positions
- Champions: Yusuke Momochi
- Runner-up: Kun Xian Ho

Capcom Cup 2014 was an Ultra Street Fighter IV tournament held at The Warfield in San Francisco, California on December 13, 2014. 16 players qualified for the tournament by winning at events at the first Capcom Pro Tour, co-sponsored by Twitch. The tournament was won by Yusuke Momochi, defeating Kun Xian Ho in the finale and winning $30,000 USD.

== Capcom Pro Tour ==
In March 2014, Capcom partnered with livestreaming video platform Twitch to create a year-long fighting game league, titled the Capcom Pro Tour. The Tour featured a large number of tournaments, among which ten "Premier Events". Winners of the Premier Events would automatically qualify for the Capcom Cup in December, and six more players were selected based on their ranking in Capcom-sponsored tournaments. During early tournaments in the Capcom pro Tour, the 2012 version of Super Street Fighter IV Arcade Edition was played. Tournaments transitioned into Ultra Street Fighter IV as it became available in June.

The Street Fighter tournament held at the Pro Tour Premier Events (except for Evo 2014) were all streamed through the "Capcom Fighters" Twitch channel. Capcom also brought smaller tournaments to well-known video game conventions such as E3 and PAX East. In April, online gaming platform Virgin Gaming (now WorldGaming) partnered with Capcom and Twitch in order to hold regional online tournaments. In total, 716 players scored points in the ranking.

== Tournament background ==
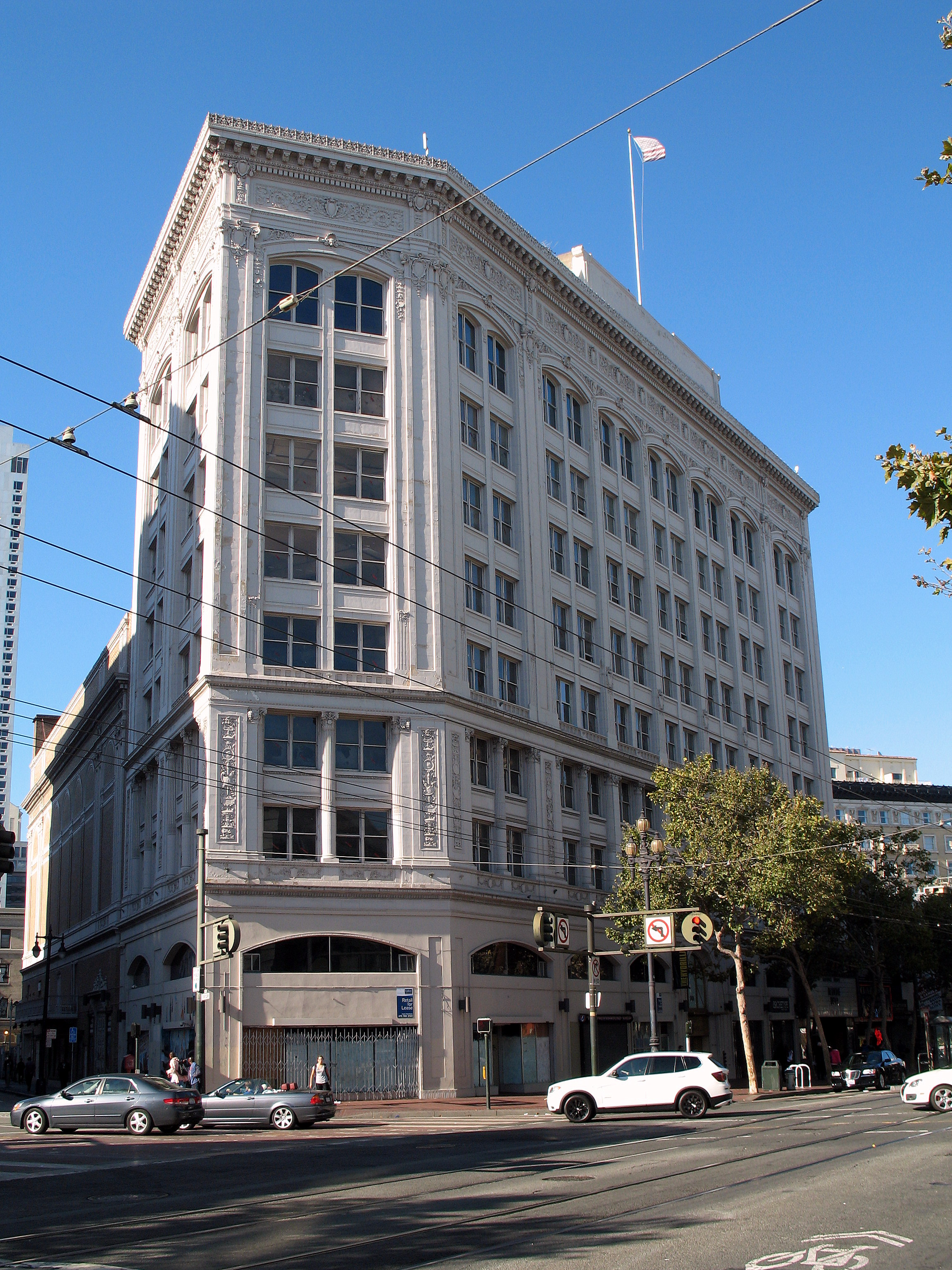
The 2014 Capcom Cup was held at The Warfield music venue in San Francisco.

The Capcom Cup was held on December 13, 2014, in The Warfield in San Francisco, a music venue usually reserved for major musical acts. Heidi Kemps of Red Bull described the venue as "close-knit and communal", though noted that The Warfield didn't afford much space for crowd control. The Capcom Cup offered live commentary not only through its online livestreams, as the commentary of James Chen and David "UltraDavid" Graham was also broadcast among the crowd. The tournament had a prize pool of over $36,000 USD, $30,000 of which went to the winner.

== Tournament summary ==
The Capcom Cup featured a double-elimination format and featured a roster of various high-level players. Justin Wong and Snake Eyez, among others, suffered two losses in a row at the start of the tournament, causing them to drop out early in the brackets. Due to Ultra Street Fighter IV's large character roster featuring 44 options, character choice became an important metagame at the tournament. Competitors were allowed to mutually blind-pick characters in order to avoid counter-picks. When a player loses, they are allowed to change their character, while the winner has to stick with theirs. Quickly, players started to bring out unexpected characters in order to surprise their opponents.

The Capcom Cup was won by Yusuke Momochi, defeating Kun Xian Ho in the finale. After winning a very close rematch against Ryan Hart in the loser's brackets of the tournament and defeating Luffy in the loser's bracket finals, Momochi was faced with Xian's Poison in the Grand Finals. Momochi caused Xian to change his character to Gen after winning the first set 2–1. Momochi then managed to force a bracket-reset and eventually won the final set 3–1.

== Results ==
Ultra Street Fighter IV
Place	Player	Alias	Character(s)	Qualification
1st	(Japan) Yusuke Momochi	EG|Momochi	Ken	South East Asia Major 2014
2nd	(Singapore) Kun Xian Ho	RZR|Xian	Gen, Poison, Dhalsim	Points
3rd	(France) Olivier Hay	MD|Luffy	Rose	Evo 2014
4th	(South Korea) Seon-Woo Lee	Infiltration	Akuma, Elena, Chun-Li	CEO 2014
5th	(United States) Eduardo Perez-Frangie	EG|PR Balrog	Balrog	NorCal Regionals 2014
5th	(United Kingdom) Ryan Hart	DIG|Ryan Hart	Ryu, Evil Ryu	Final Round XVII
7th	(Japan) Keita Ai	RZR|Fuudo	Fei Long	Dreamhack Winter 2014
7th	(France) Valentin Petit	GL|Valmaster	Chun-Li, Elena	VSFighting 4
9th	(Japan) Daigo Umehara	MCZ|Daigo Umehara	Evil Ryu	Capcom Pro Tour Asia Finals
9th	(United States) Du Dang	CRS|NuckleDu	Guile, Decapre	Points
9th	(Japan) Masato Takahashi	Bonchan	Sagat	Points
9th	(United States) Ricky Ortiz	EG|Ricky Ortiz	Rufus	Points
13th	(Japan) Hiroshi Nishikido	NISHIKIN	Blanka	Taito Arcade Nationals
13th	(United States) Darryl Lewis	SnakeEyez	Zangief	The Fall Classic 2014
13th	(Brazil) Eric Moreira Silva	CNB|ChuChu	Sakura, C. Viper	Points
13th	(United States) Justin Wong	EG|Justin Wong	Rufus	Points
