= Capcom Cup 2015 =

- 2015
- Logo

Tournament information
- Sport: Ultra Street Fighter IV
- Location: San Francisco, California, United States
- Date: December 6, 2015
- Venue: Moscone Center
- Participants: 32
- Purse: USD $250,000

Final positions
- Champion: Ryota "Kazunoko" Inoue
- Runner-up: Daigo Umehara

Capcom Cup 2015 was a professional Ultra Street Fighter IV video game tournament that was held at Moscone Center in San Francisco on December 6, 2015. 32 players qualified for the tournament by winning one of the 16 Capcom Pro Tour Premier Events or by acquiring points at them. Kun Xian Ho won three of the Premier Events, coming in third place at the Capcom Cup. Many high-profile players, including Justin Wong and Bonchan, lost two consecutive matches during the early rounds of the Cup and were eliminated. The Grand Final was a match between Mad Catz' Daigo Umehara playing as Evil Ryu and Kazunoko playing as Yun, the latter winning the match 3–2.

Being sponsored by Sony Interactive Entertainment for the first time, Capcom Cup 2015 and its Pro Tour had a total prize pool of $500,000 USD, $120,000 of which was awarded to Kazunoko. Capcom Pro Tour 2015 saw a rule change where an automatic qualification would be eliminated and converted into points if the top four winners of a Premier Event had already qualified for the Cup.

The event was the last major tournament before Ultra Street Fighter IV would be succeeded by Street Fighter V, which was created with professional competition in mind.

== 2015 Capcom Pro Tour ==
=== Tour background ===
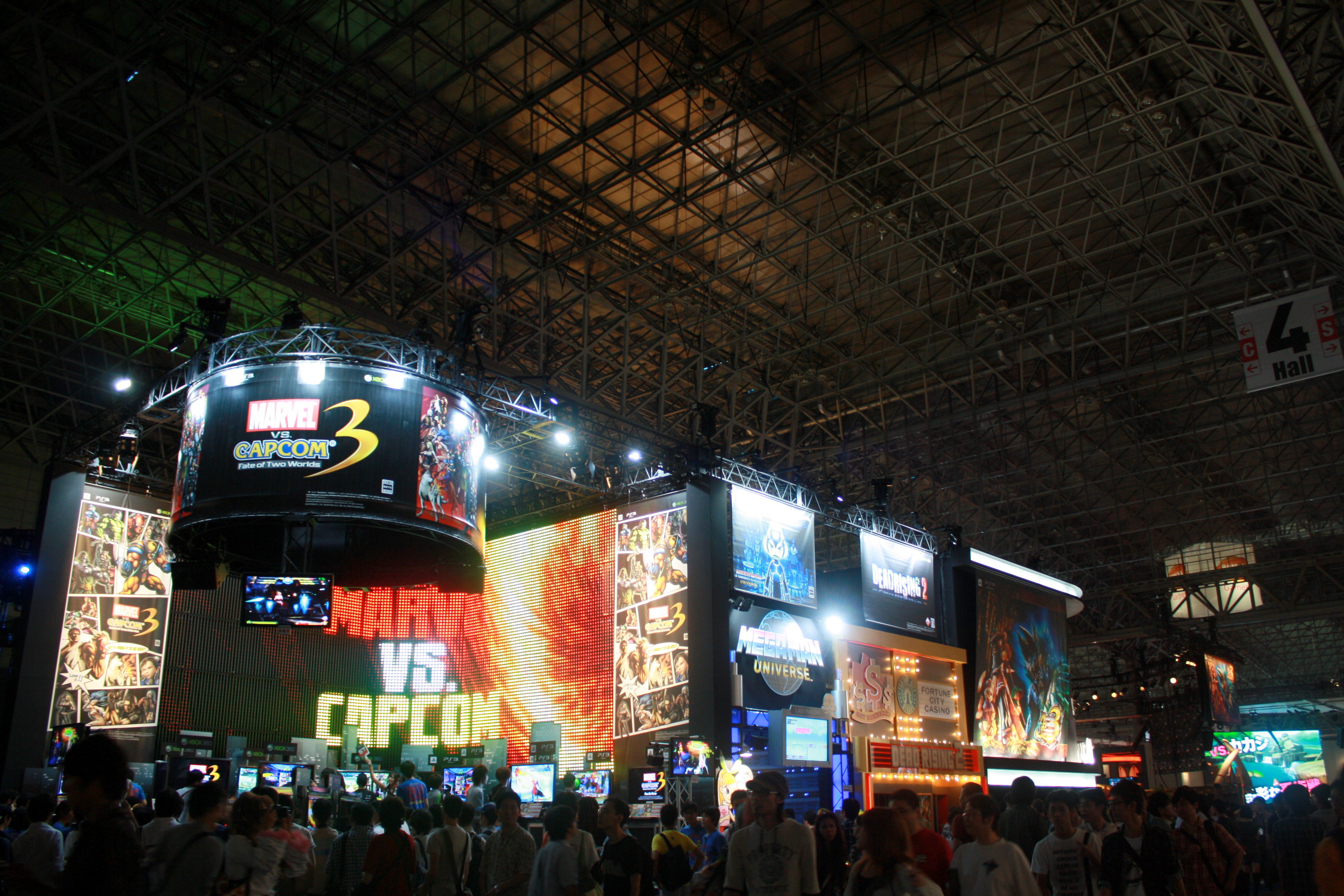
The Ultra Street Fighter IV tournament at the 2015 Tokyo Game Show was part of the Capcom Pro Tour.

A series of qualifying events for the tournament were held throughout the year, known as the 2015 Capcom Pro Tour. The Pro Tour consisted of 16 "Premier Events", divided into four "regions", them being North America, Europe, Asia, and "Wild Card". The 16 Premier Events of the 2015 Capcom Cup were:

North America

- Final Round – Atlanta, GA, United States
- NorCal Regionals – Sacramento, CA, United States
- SoCal Regionals – Orange, CA, United States
- Community Effort Orlando – Orlando, FL, United States

Europe

- Hypespotting 4 – Scotland, United Kingdom
- Stunfest – Rennes, France
- Milan Games Week – Milan, Italy
- DreamHack Winter – Jönköping, Sweden

Asia

- South East Asia Major – Bangkok, Thailand
- Tokyo Game Show – Tokyo, Japan
- Capcom Pro Tour Asia Finals – Singapore
- Ultra Hyakkishu Cup – Tokyo, Japan

Wild Card

- Evolution – Las Vegas, NV, United States
- Canada Cup – Canada
- Brasil Game Show – São Paulo, Brazil
- KO Fighting Game Festival – Kuwait

$500,000 USD was made available as prize money for the entire Capcom Cup, donated by Capcom, Twitch, and new partner Sony. Each of the Premier Events had a prize pool of US$15,000 to be split among the Top 8 winners. The 2015 Evolution Championships, one of the "Wild Card" tournaments, had a prize pool of US$50,000, $20,000 of which was awarded to the tournament's champion. Capcom stated in their press release that they had three goals in mind for the 2015 season, the first being to "give fans more Street Fighter content to enjoy and look forward to," the second being to distribute tournaments and points more evenly across the different world regions, and the last being to increase tournament prize pools in order to incentivize more players to participate. In total, 261 players scored points in the ranking.

=== Tour summary ===
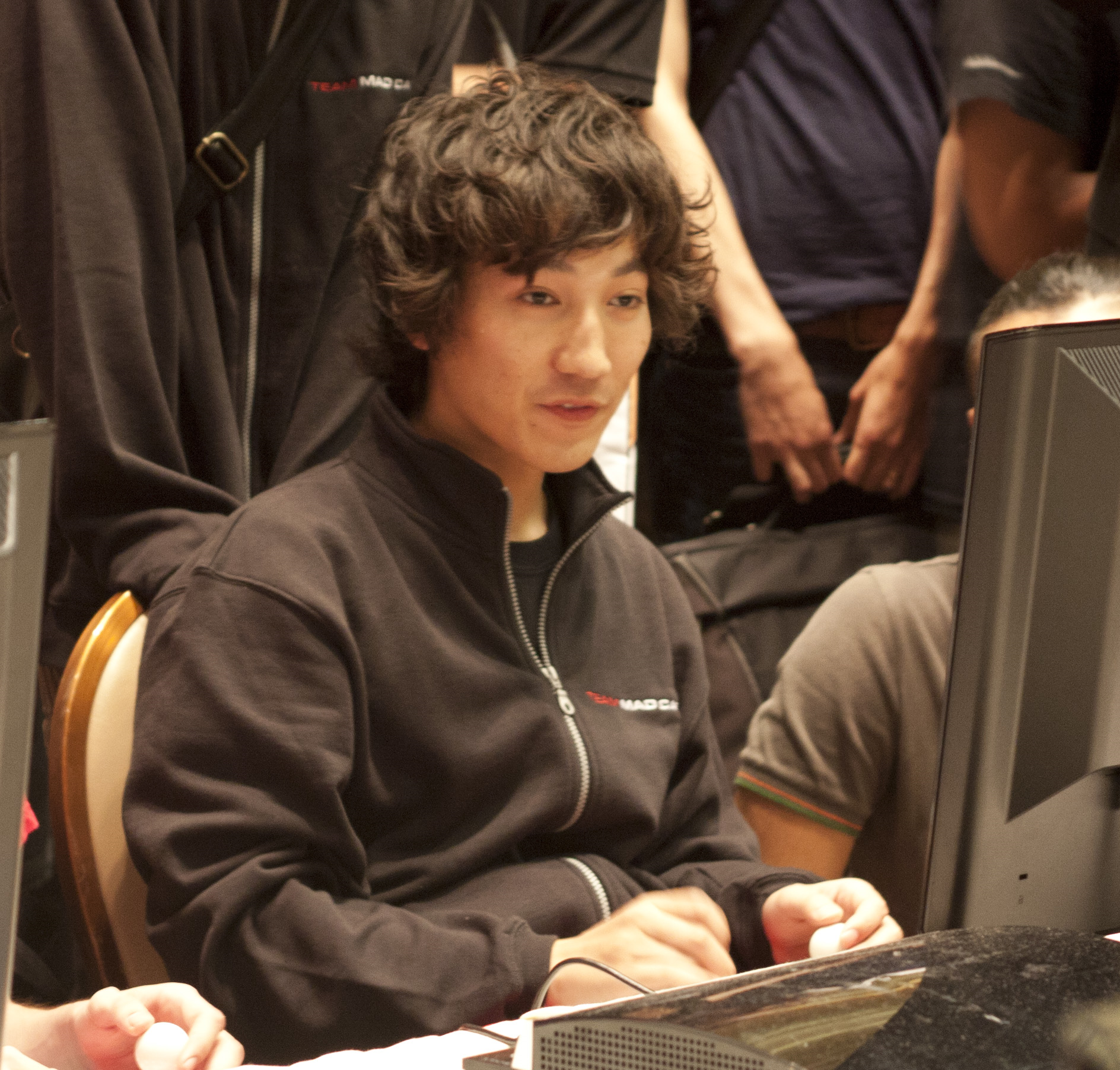
Daigo Umehara won first place at the NorCal Regionals and Stunfest Premier Events.

The Capcom Pro Tour kicked off on 22 March at Final Round 18 in Atlanta, Georgia. The tournament was won by Kun Xian Ho. The event was followed by NorCal Regionals on April 3, which was won by Daigo Umehara, and Hypespotting 4 on April 4, which was won by Kenryo "Mago" Hayashi. A wrong version of Ultra Street Fighter 4 was accidentally played during the first four matches of the NorCal's quarterfinals, which prompted tournament organizer Terry "Kineda" Ng to call for these to be replayed. In May, Seon-woo "Infiltration" Lee qualified for the 2015 Capcom Cup by making it to the finals of Stunfest 2015, where he lost to Daigo Umehara.

In May, 2015, Capcom released the PlayStation 4 port of Ultra Street Fighter IV, which was developed by SCEA's "Third Party Production group". This version of the game suffered from severe lag and glitches. Capcom announced that tournaments that are part of the Capcom Pro Tour would keep using older hardware until the issues were resolved.

Stunfest was followed by the South East Asia Major in June, where Hajime "Tokido" Taniguchi qualified for the Capcom Cup after losing to Mago in the Grand Finals. Ryota "Kazunoko" Inoue qualified by winning at Community Effort Orlando 2015 the next week, followed by Bruce "GamerBee" Hsiang qualifying by reaching the Grand Finals of EVO 2015 in July. GamerBee lost to Capcom Cup 2014 champion Yusuke Momochi, despite the latter's arcade controller experiencing a malfunction during the match, handing GamerBee a free round. In September, Dashio qualified for the Capcom Cup by winning the Tokyo Game Show, while Fuudo qualified by coming second to Xian at the KO Fighting Game Festival. The 2015 Brasil Game Show, held on October 8–12, was won by Brazilian Keoma Pacheco, beating Japanese player Haitani in the finale. SoCal Regionals 2015, which was moved from May 1 to October 9, was won by Masato "Boncan" Takahashi, while Arubi "RB" Kao qualified later that month by coming in third at Milan Games Week.

The Canada Cup, also held in October, was won by Tokido, defeating Fuudo by a 3-1 margin in the Grand Final. Yusuke Momochi came in third-place and GamerBee fourth. As all of the top four finishers had already qualified for Capcom Cup, the stake was eliminated and converted into an additional points-based berth, due to a rule change announced after Infiltration qualified for the Cup at Stunfest by coming in third.

The Capcom Pro Tour Asia Finals 2015 were held on November 13–15. Lee Chung "Poongko" Gon won the tournament by defeating Naoki "Nemo" Nemoto in the grand finals. DreamHack Winter 2015, the last Premier Event of the Capcom Pro Tour, was the third Premier Event of the 2015 season to be won by Xian. He defeated French player Olivier "Luffy" Hay in the Grand Finals, though the latter had already qualified for the Capcom Cup through points alone.

16 players, including Darryl "Snake Eyez" Lewis, Kentaro "Misse" Nakamura, and Justin Wong, qualified for Capcom Cup 2015 by acquiring a large number of points throughout the Pro Tour. Director of brand marketing at Capcom Matt Dahlgren stated in an interview with Fortune.com that each Premier Event got 300,000 to 500,000 unique viewers, cumulating to a total of 40 million views throughout the season.

== Tournament background ==
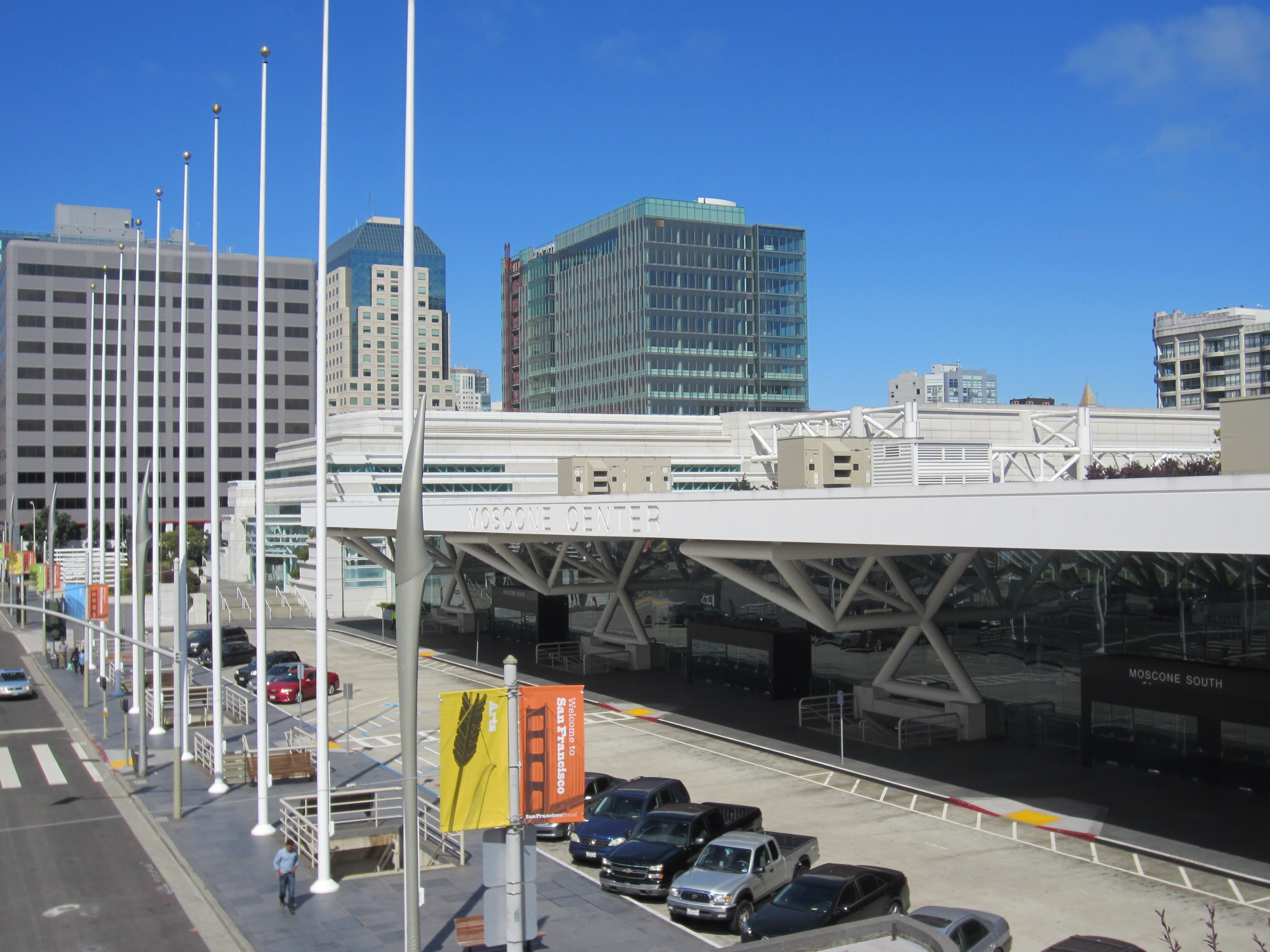
Capcom Cup 2015 was held at Moscone Center in San Francisco.

Capcom Cup 2015 was held at Moscone Center in San Francisco, California on Sunday, December 6, 2015. The tournament was hosted on the second day of Sony's PlayStation Experience event. For the 2015 Cup, Capcom increased the maximum player spots from 16 to 32. Players had to win at least two out of three games in order to reach the Top 8. The Capcom Cup had a total prize pool of US$250,000, which was split among the Top 8 players as follows:

- 1st Place: $120,000
- 2nd Place: $60,000
- 3rd Place: $25,000
- 4th Place: $15,000
- 5th-6th Place: $10,000 each
- 7th-8th Place: $5,000 each

The tournament opened at 10:00 AM local time and closed at 9:30 PM. There were two livestreams of the event available on the official Capcom Pro Tour website.

Prior to the tournament, many fans worried that the character Elena would be a dominant force throughout the tournament. The character was placed at top of most tier lists at the time due to her "awkward" and healing Ultra skill. Justin Wong, GamerBee, and Xian had been highly successful throughout the 2015 season playing with the character, though Elena ended up not being used much during the tournament.

During the tournament, YouPorn-sponsored player Valentin "Valmaster" Petit was barred by Capcom from wearing jersey advertising a pornography website, and YouPorn replaced the jersey with one featuring a pixelized version of its logo. Capcom Cup 2015 runner-up Daigo Umehara donated his US$60,000 prize check towards the NYU Game Center EVO scholarship award winner.

== Tournament summary ==
=== Opening ceremony and elimination rounds ===
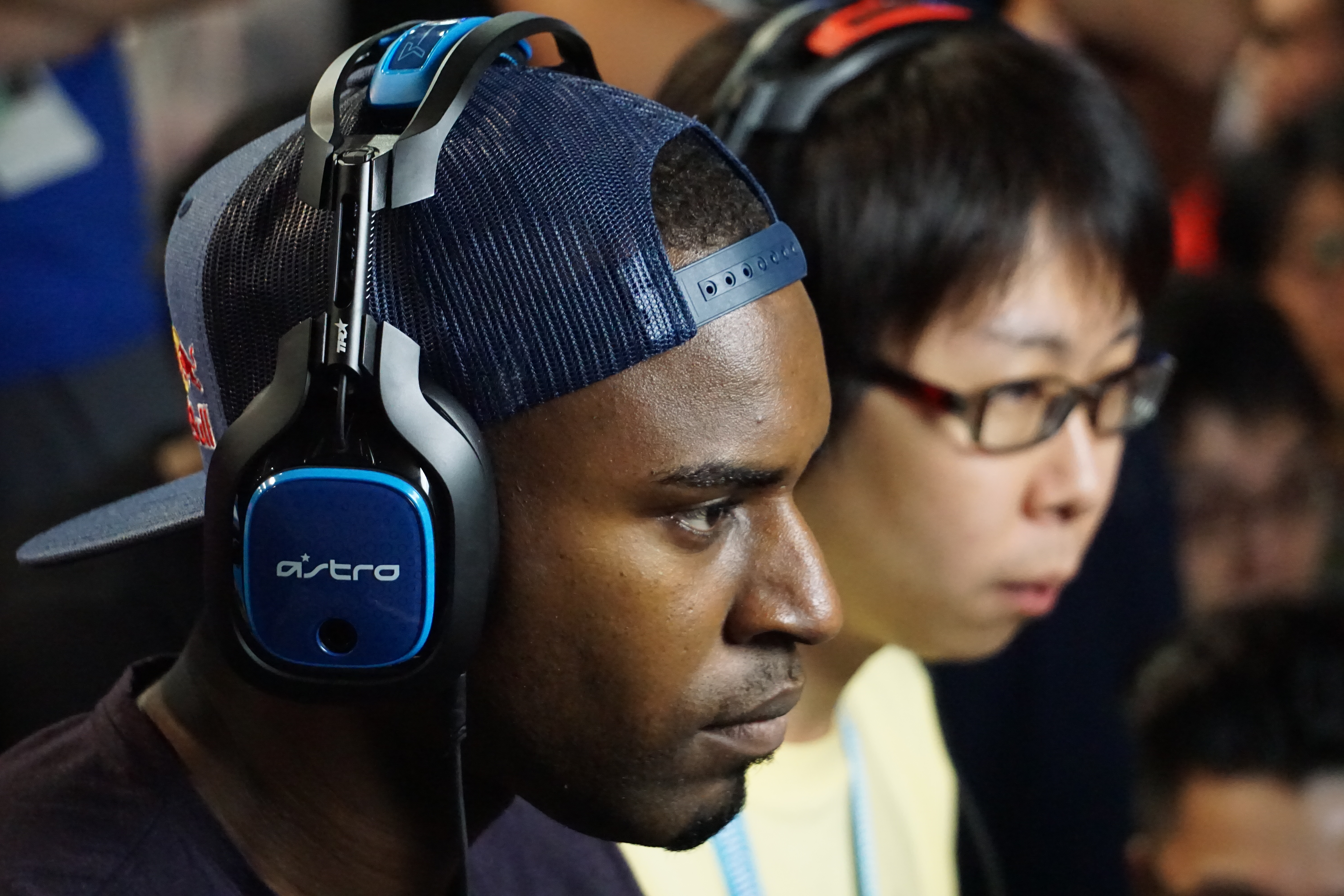
Snake Eyez in 2016

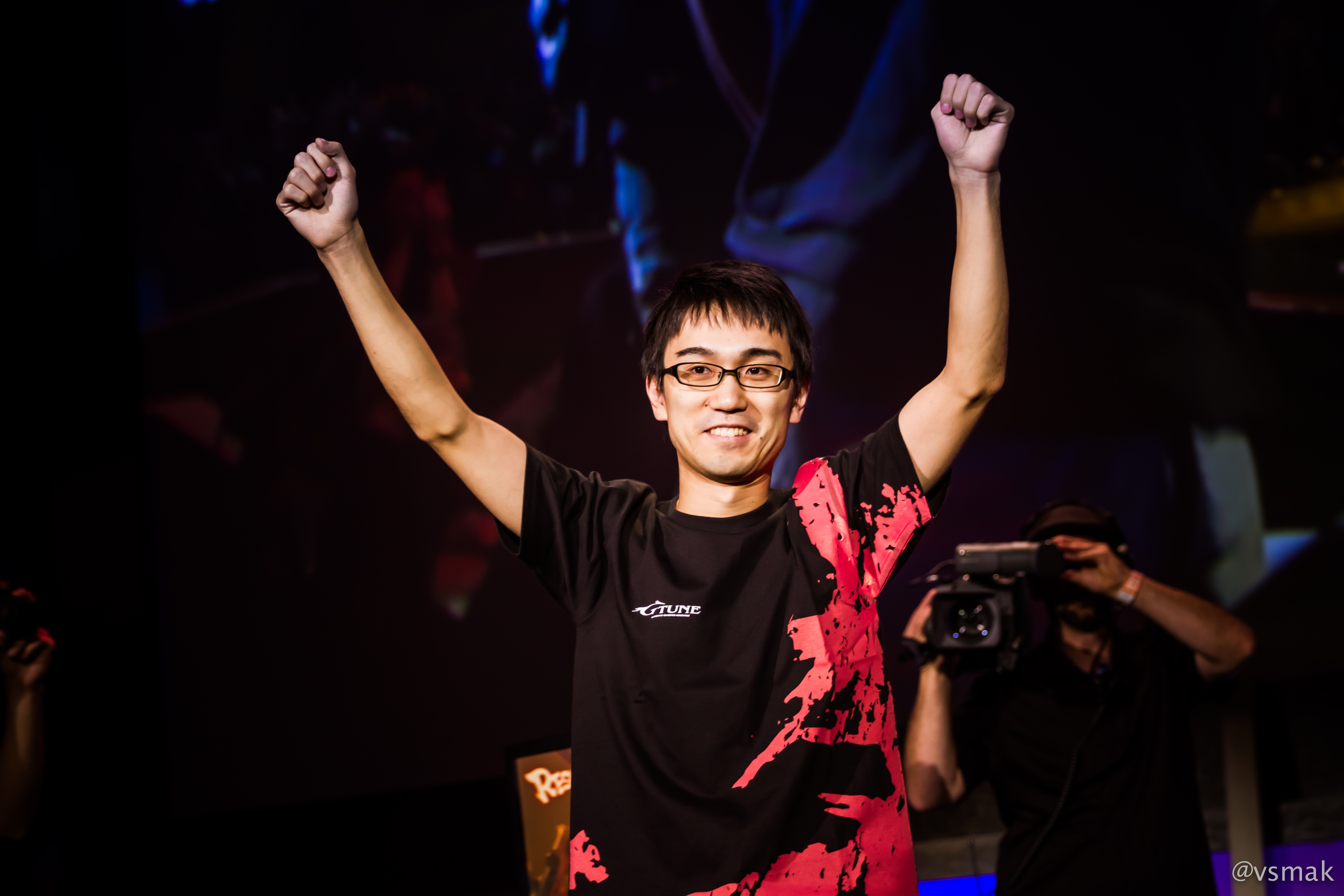
Kazunoko at Capcom Cup 2015

According to Paste Magazine, the organization of Capcom Cup 2015 went through a lot of effort to make the tournament appeal to people outside of the fighting game community by using bumpers to explain terminology and using informal polls throughout the livestream asking who would win the next match, the results established favorites and underdogs. The livestream opened with a recap video cataloging the "best moments" of the past season, followed by commentator Mike Ross introducing the tournament's outline and prize pool. At the start of the tournament, every participant got his own introduction, "emerging from behind a glossy door showing an enlarged silhouette through a puff of smoke." The event's six commentators were also all given an introduction.

Early rounds of the tournament saw a few fan-favorites, such as Justin Wong and Naoki "Nemo" Nemoto, lose two consecutive rounds and get eliminated. NuckleDu was the only American player making it through the first round with a win, though he lost against Misse and Kazunoko in the following rounds, leaving Snake Eyez as the only American representative to reach the Top 8. Meanwhile, Pacheco was the first Brazilian player to make it to the Top 8 of a tournament of this size, while Misse used rarely played character Makoto with high skill to beat Bonchan, NuckleDu, and Tokido and enter the Top 8 as well. Xian won four elimination rounds despite pushing it to the maximum number of games three times, while Poongko featured three easy victories over Itabashi Zangief, Yusuke Momochi, and HumanBomb, losing to Xian before entering the Top 8. Both also lost once to Daigo Umehara on his way to the finals.

Kazunoko lost his first game of the tournament against Gustavo "801 Strider" Romero, but didn't lose any games from that point onward, defeating Problem X, Misse, and Daigo Umehara before entering the Top 8. Umehara's games during the elimination rounds were less dominant, though he defeated 801 Strider, Snake Eyez, Poongko, and Xian on his way to the finals. Umehara's scored a surprising comeback against Infiltration during the final match of the elimination rounds, turning around the last round of the match despite having only a sliver of health left.

=== Cup finals ===
The Capcom Cup finals started with Kazunoko, Umehara, Xian, and Poongko in the winner's bracket and Snake Eyez, Misse, Infiltration, and Keoma in the loser's bracket. Umehara eliminated Snake Eyez and Poongko after being knocked into the loser's brackets by Kazunoko in the quarterfinals. Umehara defeated Xian in the loser's finals 3–0, despite Xian using Dhalsim as a counter-pick to Daigo because it won him the match a year earlier. Kazunoko and Daigo Umehara finally matched off again in the Grand Finals. Kazunoko won the first round as he pressured Umehara by abusing Yun's command throws, dive kicks, and block strings. Umehara won the second round as he switched up his tactic and became more offensive, using many of Evil Ryu's combos. Kazunoko won the third round, followed by another quick win by Daigo. The final round of the match was won by Kazunoko, making him the Capcom Cup champion.

== Results ==
Ultra Street Fighter IV
| Place | Player | Alias | Character(s) | Qualification |
|---|---|---|---|---|
| 1st | (Japan) Ryota Inoue | Kazunoko | Yun | CEO 2015 |
| 2nd | (Japan) Daigo Umehara | MCZ|Daigo Umehara | Evil Ryu | NorCal Regionals 2015 |
| 3rd | (Singapore) Kun Xian Ho | RZR|Xian | Gen, Poison, Dhalsim | Final Round 18 |
| 4th | (South Korea) Chung Gon Lee | /r/Kappa|Poongko | Seth | Capcom Pro Tour Asia Finals 2015 |
| 5th | (United States) Darryl Lewis | RB|Snake Eyez | Zangief, Evil Ryu | Points |
| 5th | (Japan) Kentaro Nakamura | /r/Kappa|Misse | Makoto | Points |
| 7th | (South Korea) Seon-woo Lee | RZR|Infiltration | Decapre, Chun-Li | Stunfest 2015 |
| 7th | (Brazil) Keoma Pacheco | FGCBR|Keoma | Abel | Brasil Game Show 2015 |
| 9th | (Japan) Hiromiki Kumada | Itabashi Zangief | Zangief | Points |
| 9th | (Hong Kong) Jonny Cheng | CCG|HumanBomb | Sakura, Sagat | Points |
| 9th | (Japan) Hajime Taniguchi | MCZ|Tokido | Akuma | South East Asia Major 2015 |
| 9th | (France) Olivier Hay | MD|Luffy | Rose | DreamHack Winter 2015 |
| 13th | (United States) Du Dang | Liquid|NuckleDu | Guile, Decapre | Points |
| 13th | (Japan) Sanshiro Nagai | YBK|Shiro | Abel | Points |
| 13th | (Taiwan) Bruce Hsiang | AVM|GamerBee | Elena, Adon | Evo 2015 |
| 13th | (Japan) Kenryo Hayashi | MCZ|Mago | Yang | Hypespotting 4 |
| 17th | (United Kingdom) Benjamin Simon | KIG|Problem X | C. Viper, Seth | Points |
| 17th | (Japan) Keita Ai | RZR|Fuudo | Fei Long | KO Fighting Game Festival 2015 |
| 17th | (France) Valentin Petit | YP|Valmaster | Chun-Li | Points |
| 17th | (Japan) Takenori Shimomura | MF|Tonpy | C. Viper | Points |
| 17th | (China) Haojun Su | Qanba.Douyu|Dakou | Evil Ryu | Points |
| 17th | (Japan) Hiroshi Arai | YBK|Dashio | Seth | Mad Catz Tokyo Game Show 2015 |
| 17th | (China) Zhuojun Zeng | Qanba.Douyu|Xiao Hai | Evil Ryu, Elena | Points |
| 17th | (Japan) Yusuke Momochi | EG|Momochi | Ken, Evil Ryu | Capcom Cup 2014 |
| 25th | (United States) Gustavo Romero | WFX|801 Strider | Abel | Points |
| 25th | (Japan) Masato Takahashi | RB|Bonchan | Sagat | SoCal Regionals 2015 |
| 25th | (United States) Kevin Landon | YOMI|Dieminion | Guile | Points |
| 25th | (United States) Justin Wong | EG|Justin Wong | Rose, Elena | Points |
| 25th | (Singapore) Ghim Kee Eng | RZR|Gackt | Fei Long, Sagat | Points |
| 25th | (Japan) Naoki Nemoto | Nemo | Rolento | Ultra Hyakkishu Cup |
| 25th | (China) Xijie Zeng | Dark Jiewa | Ken | Points |
| 25th | (Taiwan) Arubi Kao | RZR|RB | Rolento, Hugo | Milan Games Week 2015 |
