= Stunfest 2016 =

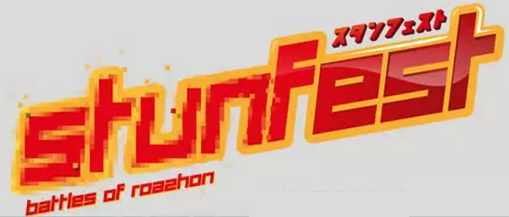

Tournament information
- Sport: Street Fighter V
- Tournament format(s): Double elimination

Final positions
- Champion: Yusuke Momochi
- Runner-up: Fuudo

Stunfest 2016 was a fighting game tournament that took place on May 21–22 in Rennes, France. Being a Premier Event of the Capcom Pro Tour, the winner of the event would qualify for the 2016 Capcom Cup. The Grand Finals of Stunfest 2016 were dominated by Asian players such as Tokido and Daigo Umehara, with European players like Luffy being eliminated on day one. Japanese players Fuudo and Yusuke Momochi faced off in the final round, with Momochi winning the tournament.

== Background ==
Shortly before the release of Street Fighter V in February 2016, Capcom announced the schedule of the Capcom Pro Tour, Stunfest being its third global premier event. Stunfest 2016 shared its spotlight with two other Capcom Pro Tour tournaments that took place during the same weekend. Various Evil Geniuses members, including Justin Wong, competed at Toryuken V, which took place in Toronto, Ontario, Canada. Meanwhile, top Peruvian and Chilean players participated in Lima Salty 3 in Lima, Peru. All three tournaments started on Saturday, May 21, Stunfest kicking off at 6:30 AM local time. Taking place in Rennes, France, over 500 players registered to compete in order to qualify for the Capcom Cup later that year.

== Tournament summary ==
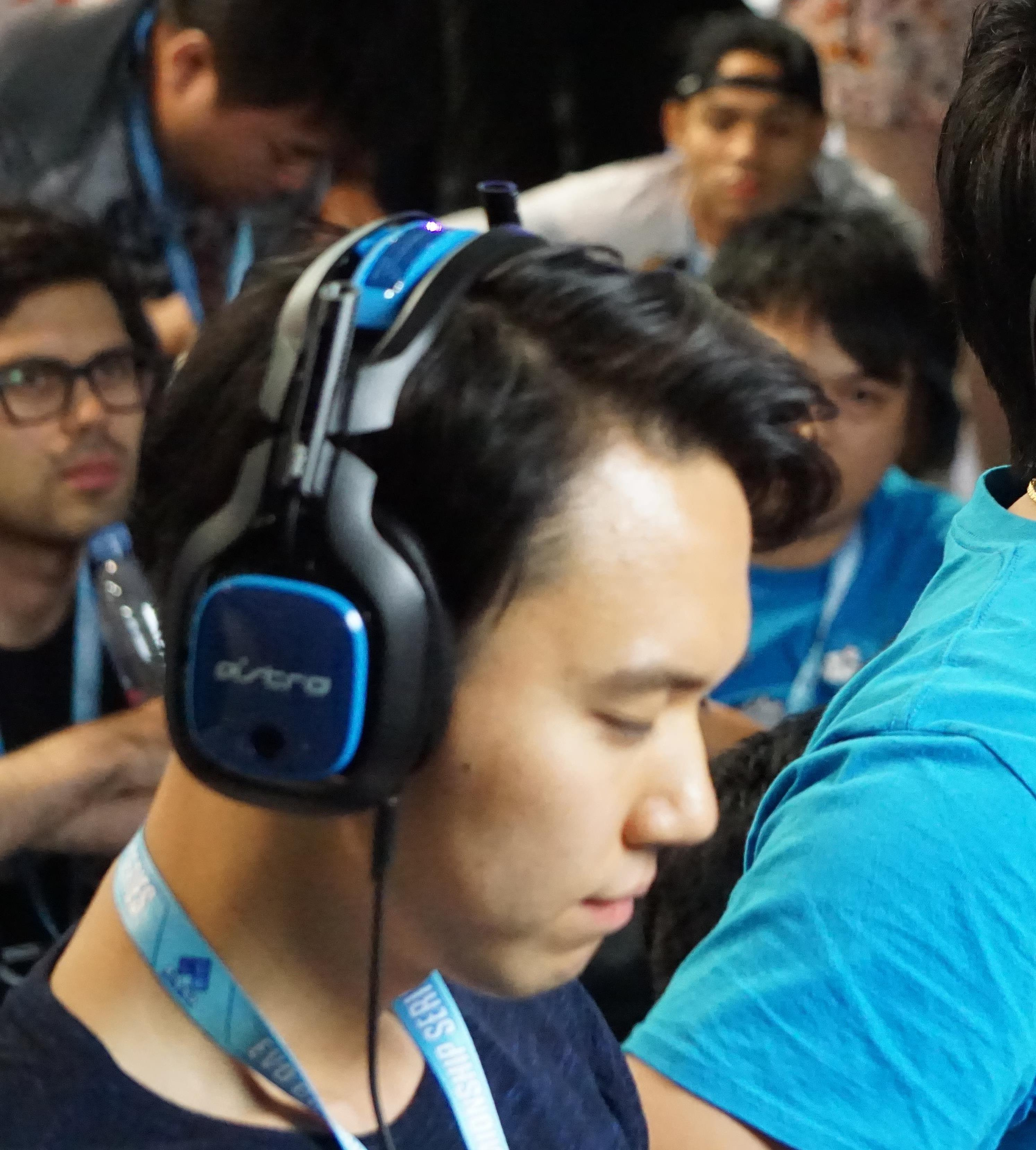
Tokido was a fan-favorite player during the tournament.

=== Participants ===
Having won the first two Premier events of the season, Infiltration had already qualified for the Capcom Cup and therefore did not need to show. This gave players such as Hajime "Tokido" Taniguchi, who had finished second to Infiltration at three separate events, a higher winning chance. Regardless, many players who had already qualified for the Cup still contended, including Hiroyuki "Eita" Nagata, and Tatsuya Haitani who won the Asian Pro Tour events earlier that season.

Champion of Stunfest 2015 Daigo Umehara joined the tournament as well, it being his first Pro Tour event this season and his second Street Fighter V tournament. Umehara stated during a livestream that his goals at Stunfest "revolve more around personal improvement than results." Stunfest 2016 also featured participation by Luffy, who had been highly successful at Ultra Street Fighter IV during the 2014 and 2015 Pro Tour seasons and won three Street Fighter V tournaments in a row in the month prior to Stunfest. Other high-level players that participated in Stunfest 2016 included Nathan "Mister Crimson" Massol, Arman "Phenom" Hanjani, Benjamin "Problem X" Simon, GamerBee, and Xian. The tournament's participation primarily originated from Europe and Asia, the highest-level American player being Ryan "Gootecks" Gutierrez.

=== Competition ===
The eight players that made it through the elimination rounds to reach the Grand Finals were Xiao Hai, Tokido, Yusuke Momochi, and Fuudo in the winner's bracket, and Xian, Haitani, Daigo Umehara, and Eita in the loser's bracket. The Top 8 all hailed from the Asian continent, and Europe was not represented during the Finals. French player Luffy finished 13th, while Marcus "Packz" Parker finished 9th.

The tournament was won by Capcom Cup 2014 and EVO 2015 champion Yusuke Momochi, defeating Eita, Xiao Hai, and Tokido during the finals. After being sent to the loser's bracket, Momochi beat Fuudo twice during the Grans Finals, despite the latter's "surprisingly strong" R. Mika play. Momochi became the second player to qualify for the 2016 Capcom Cup this way, following Infiltration. Daigo Umehara was eliminated in the first round by Haitani, while Xian played strong games using F.A.N.G., a rarely chosen character.

== Results ==
Place	Player	Alias	Character(s)
1st	(Japan) Yusuke Momochi	EG|Momochi	Ken
2nd	(Japan) Keita Ai	RZR|Fuudo	R. Mika
3rd	(Japan) Hajime Taniguchi	Tokido	Ryu
4th	(China) Zhuojun Zeng	Qanba|Xiao Hai	Cammy
5th	(Singapore) Kun Xian Ho	RZR|Xian	F.A.N.G.
5th	(Japan) Tatsuya Haitani	MJS|Haitani	Necalli
7th	(Japan) Hiroyuki Nagata	Eita	Ken
7th	(Japan) Daigo Umehara	RB|Daigo Umehara	Ryu
9th	(United Kingdom) Marcus Parker	Perilous|Packz	Karin
9th	(France) Nathan Massol	MD|Mister Crimson	Laura, Dhalsim
9th	(Japan) Ryota Inoue	Kazunoko	Cammy
9th	(Japan) Goichi Kishida	HM|Go1	Chun-Li
13th	(Taiwan) Bruce Hsiang	AVM|GamerBee	Necalli
13th	(France) Olivier Hay	RB|Luffy	R. Mika
13th	(Japan) Shinya Ohnuki	OR|Nuki	Chun-Li
13th	(Netherlands) Emanuele Lo Presti	ECV.RSD|CharmingRogue	Chun-Li
