= Evo 2014 =

2014 Evolution Championship Series

Tournament information
- Location: Las Vegas, Nevada, United States
- Dates: July 11–13
- Tournament format: Double elimination
- Venue: Westgate Las Vegas Resort & Casino

Final positions
- Champions: USF4: Olivier "Luffy" Hay; UMvC3: Justin Wong; SSBM: Joseph "Mang0" Marquez; KI: Emmanuel "CD Jr." Brito; BBCP: Keiji "Galileo" Okamoto; KoFXIII: Zhuojun "Xiao Hai" Zeng; IGAU: Dominique "SonicFox" McLean; TTT2: Hyun-jin "JDCR" Kim

The 2014 Evolution Championship Series (commonly referred to as Evo 2014 or EVO 2014) was a fighting game event held in at Westgate Las Vegas on July 11–13. The event featured a major tournament for eight fighting games, including Ultra Street Fighter IV and BlazBlue: Chrono Phantasma. The event was part of the first Capcom Pro Tour.

== Background ==
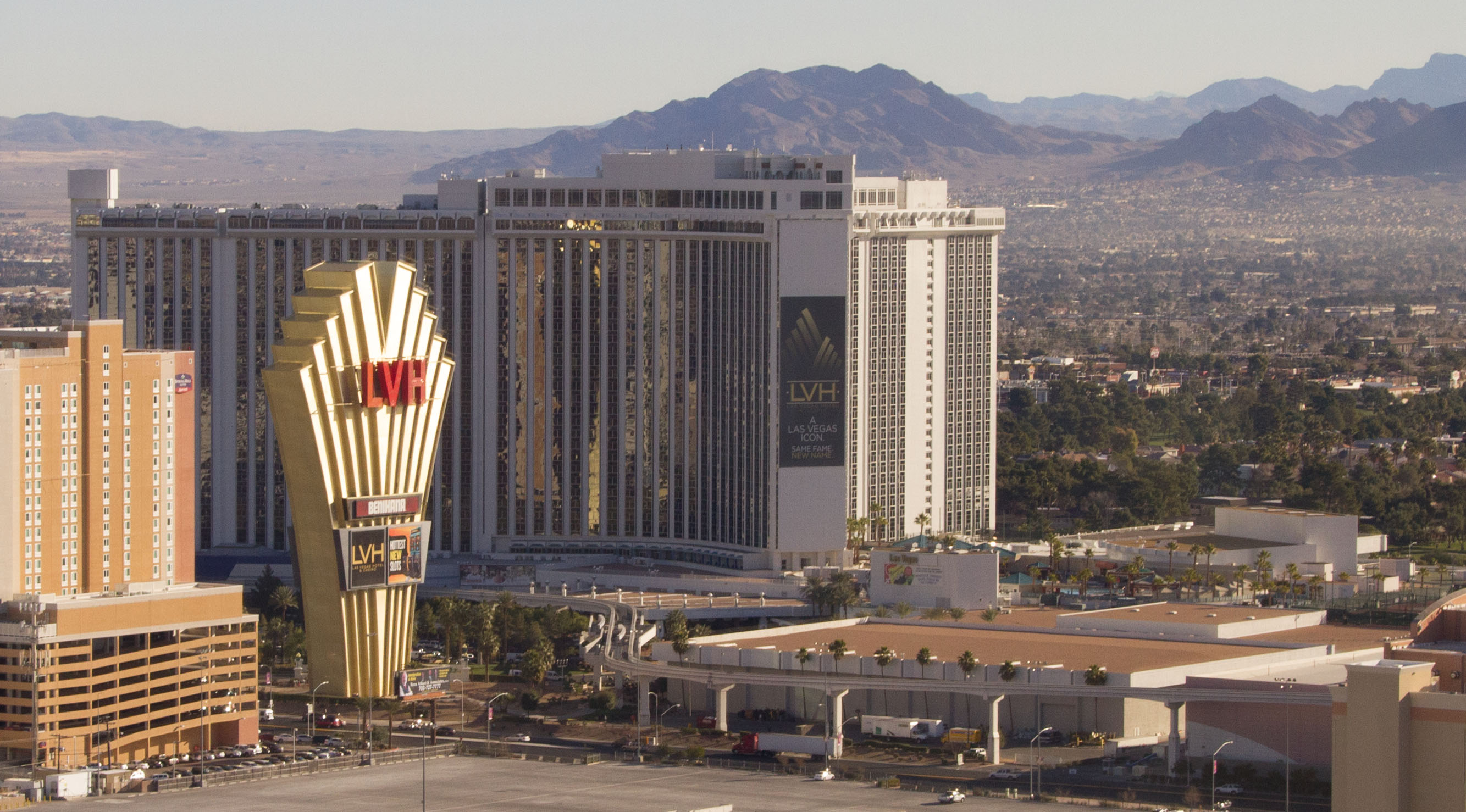
Evo 2014 was held at Westgate Las Vegas.

Evo 2014 was announced in September 2013 and was slated to feature primarily Xbox 360 versions of fighting games. As the first Capcom Pro Tour was announced in March 2014, Evo was scheduled to be one of its ten first "Premier Events". Capcom announced a month later that the company would provide a bonus $10,000 USD to the prize pool of Evo's Ultra Street Fighter IV tournament. Nintendo also sponsored the event, which was noted as a surprising shift in policy after the company tried to shut down the Super Smash Bros. portion of the event in 2013.

All of the tournaments held at Evo 2014 were livestreamed and available for free on the Twitch online video service. Evo 2014 broke the record for the largest Super Smash Bros. Melee competition up to that point, with 970 entrants. The Ultra Street Fighter IV tournament also broke its record, with nearly 2,000 players competing for the title. The event, held at the Westgate Las Vegas Resort & Casino on July 11–13, had a total prize pool of US$100,000 and was described by IGN as "the 'World Cup' of competitive fighting games."

== Games ==
Eight major tournaments were held at Evo 2014. The games played were:

- Ultra Street Fighter IV
- Ultimate Marvel vs. Capcom 3
- Super Smash Bros. Melee
- BlazBlue: Chrono Phantasma
- Killer Instinct
- Injustice: Gods Among Us
- King of Fighters XIII
- Tekken Tag 2

2014 was the first year to feature Killer Instinct as a main title at the Evolution Championship Series. The 2013 Xbox One release of the game was well received by both critics and the fighting game community. Injustice: Gods Among Us failed to impress audiences at Evo 2013, and Ozzie Mejia of Shack News suggested that, if the game were to disappoint again, it was likely it wouldn't return in 2015.

=== Reveals ===
Bandai Namco revealed the first trailer for Tekken 7 at Evo 2014. NetherRealm Studios announced that the character Raiden would return in Mortal Kombat X, which was to be released the following year. Meanwhile Microsoft announced that Maya would be the next character to be added to Killer Instinct. Nintendo showed a video of Reggie Fils-Aimé thanking the fighting game community for their dedication to the Super Smash Bros. series during the Melee finals.

== Tournament summary ==
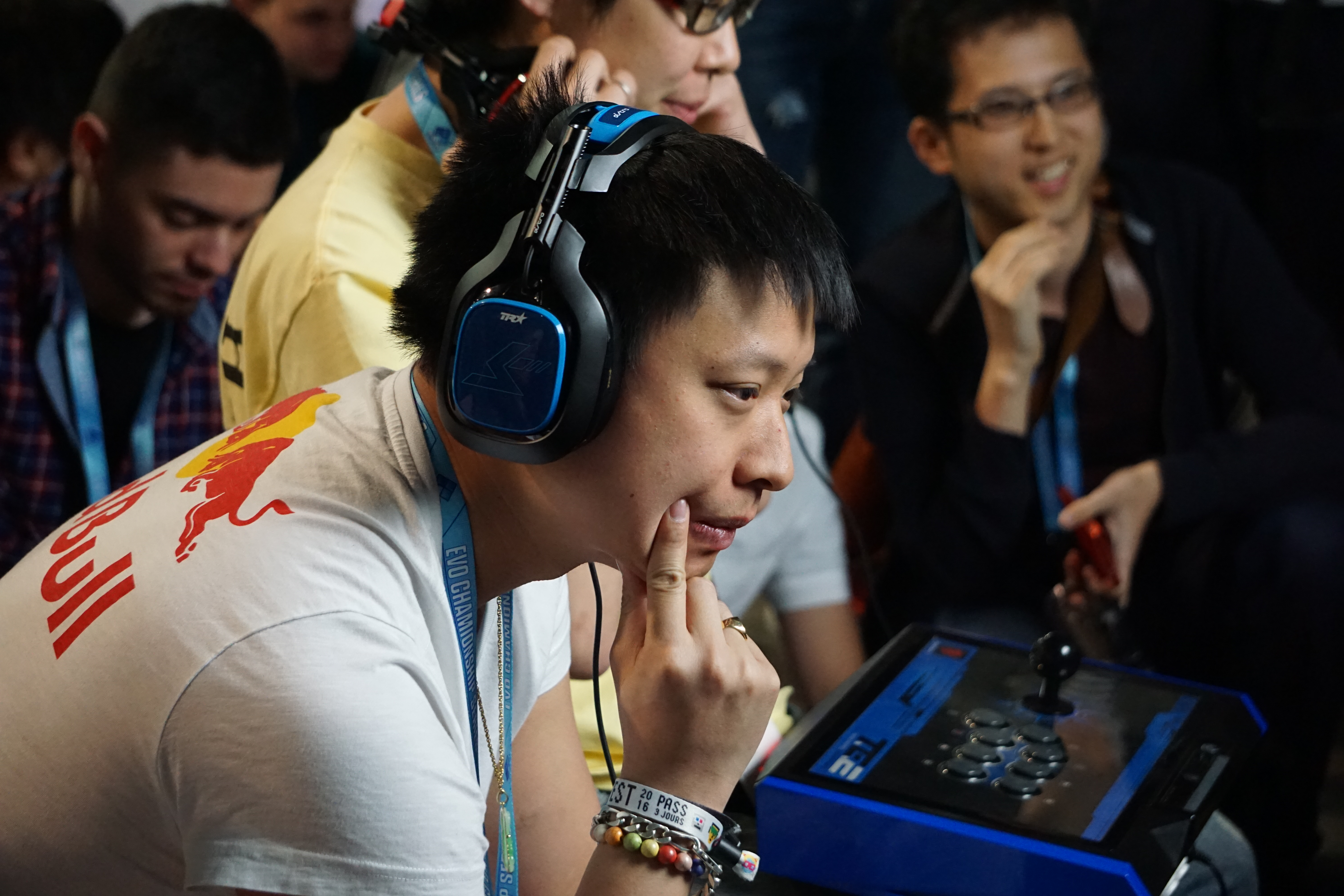
French player Luffy (pictured in 2016) won the Ultra Street Fighter IV tournament at Evo 2014.

The Ultra Street Fighter IV tournament was won by Olivier "Luffy" Hay, playing on a PlayStation gamepad rather than a more traditional arcade controller. Luffy, playing as the character Rose won against Japanese player Bonchan in the finale. Daigo Umehara finished outside of the Top 8 at Evo 2014 for the first time in the tournament's history.

Playing as the character Litchi, Japanese player Garireo won the BlazBlue: Chrono Phantasma tournament. Coming out of the loser's bracket, Garireo's final match against Dogura's Azrael was considered highly impressive by journalist. Mike Fahey of Kotaku described his 3-to-2 win as "the most intense battle Of EVO 2014" up to that point, and Earnest Cavalli of Engadget called it the "most thrilling competitive drama" of the weekend. Garireo won over US$23,000 at the tournament.

The Ultimate Marvel vs. Capcom tournament was won by Justin Wong after making a high-tension comeback against Filipino Champ in the winners finals, and would go on to defeat Chris G in the grand finals. Meanwhile, the Super Smash Bros. Melee tournament was won by Mango, who defeated Hungrybox in the finale and won US$5,820.

== Results ==
Ultra Street Fighter IV
Place	Player	Alias	Character(s)
1st	(France) Olivier Hay	MD|Luffy	Rose
2nd	(Japan) Masato Takahashi	Bonchan	Sagat
3rd	(Japan) Keita Ai	RZR|Fuudo	Fei Long
4th	(United States) Darryl Lewis	RG|Snake Eyez	Zangief
5th	(United States) Ricki Ortiz	EG|Ricky Ortiz	Rufus, Rolento
5th	(Singapore) Ghim Kee Eng	RZR|Gackt	Fei Long
7th	(Japan) Naoto Sako	HORI|Sako	Ibuki, Elena, Evil Ryu, Gen
7th	(Japan) Yusuke Momochi	EG|Momochi	Ken, Juri

Ultimate Marvel vs. Capcom 3
Place	Player	Alias	Character(s)
1st	(United States) Justin Wong	EG|JWong	Wolverine/Storm/Akuma
2nd	(United States) Christopher Gonzalez	GG|NYChrisG	Morrigan/Doctor Doom/Vergil, Morrigan/Magneto/Doctor Doom
3rd	(United States) Ryan Ramirez	RG|Filipino Champ	Magneto/Dormammu/Doctor Doom, Magneto/Doctor Doom/Phoenix, Morrigan/Magneto/Doctor Doom
4th	(United States) Raynel Hidalgo	CTRL|RayRay	Magneto/Doctor Doom/Sentinel
5th	(United States) Jan-Michael del Rio	Jan	Hulk/Shuma-Gorath/Haggar
5th	(United States) Job Figueroa	RG|Flocker	Zero/Vergil/Hawkeye, Zero/Dante/Vergil
7th	(United States) Steven Delgado	HoC.BIFU|Insaynne	Nova/Spencer/Doctor Doom
7th	(United States) Martin Phan	MRN|Marn	Zero/Vergil/Strider

Super Smash Bros. Melee
Place	Player	Alias	Character(s)
1st	(United States) Joseph Marquez	C9|Mang0	Fox, Falco
2nd	(United States) Juan Debiedma	CRS|Hungrybox	Jigglypuff, Fox, Falco
3rd	(Sweden) Adam Lindgren	P4K.EMP|Armada	Peach, Young Link
4th	(United States) Kevin Nanney	EG|PPMD	Falco, Marth
5th	(United States) Jeffrey Williamson	MOR|Axe	Pikachu
5th	(United States) Jason Zimmerman	P4K.EMP|Mew2King	Marth, Sheik
7th	(United States) Otto Bisno	GC|Silent Wolf	Fox
7th	(United States) Jeremy Westfahl	Fly Amanita	Ice Climbers

Killer Instinct
Place	Player	Alias	Character(s)
1st	(United States) Emmanuel Brito	KN.RM|CDjr	Sadira, Jago
2nd	(United States) Jonathan Deleon	RG|Rico Suave	Thunder, Fulgore, Glacius, Jago, Sabrewulf
3rd	(United States) Justin Wong	EG|JWong	Sabrewulf
4th	(United States) Neilimen Alicea	Gutter Magic	Thunder
5th	(United States) Lenin Castillo	IC.ENTH|MyGod88	Sabrewulf
5th	(United States) Grant Gibson	Tswagg	Sadira
7th	(United States) Brian Rincon	Mr. Grimmmz	Jago
7th	(United States) Erik Johnson	Pretty E	Orchid

BlazBlue: Chrono Phantasma
Place	Player	Alias	Character(s)
1st	(Japan) Keiji Okamoto	Galileo	Litchi
2nd	(Japan) Ryo Nozaki	Dogura	Azrael
3rd	(Japan) Ryuji Utsumi	BE.TSB|Dora_Bang	Bang
4th	(Japan) Yoshiki Kouno	Yoshiki	Nu-13
5th	(Japan) Shunichi Kubota	N-O	Rachel
5th	(Japan) Kizuki Kudo	Tiku	Tager
7th	(United States) Derek Bruscas	sG	Litchi
7th	(Japan) Satoshi Kawai	Tochigin	Azrael

The King of Fighters XIII
Place	Player	Alias	Character(s)
1st	(China) Zhuojun Zeng	Qanba|Xiao Hai	EX Iori/Mr. Karate/Kim
2nd	(Japan) Hajime Taniguchi	MCZ|Tokido	EX Iori/Mr. Karate/Chin
3rd	(Taiwan) Jiahong Lin	LDA|ET	Clark/Mr. Karate/EX Iori, EX Iori/Mr. Karate/Kim
4th	(South Korea) Kwang-noh Lee	Cafe id|Mad KOF	Duo Lon/Daimon/Kim, Duo Lon/Chin/Kim
5th	(United States) Josimar Jimenez	TC|Yoshi	EX Kyo/Benimaru/Shen, EX Kyo/Billy/Shen
5th	(Japan) Heesan Woo	Woo	King/Takuma/Kim
7th	(United States) Nick Woods	TC|Chris KOF	Duo Lon/Iori/Shen
7th	(Chile) Felipe Torres	VGM|Misterio	Yuri/Saiki/King

Injustice: Gods Among Us
Place	Player	Alias	Character(s)
1st	(United States) Dominique McLean	RG|SonicFox	Batgirl
2nd	(United States) Brant McCaskill	AK|Pig of the Hut	Zod
3rd	(United States) Malik Terry	IC|MIT 88	Deathstroke, Aquaman
4th	(United States) Kyle Panlilio	GGA|pimpimjim	Hawkgirl, Raven, Shazam
5th	(United States) Denzell Terry	IC|DJT 88	Aquaman, Doomsday, Green Lantern, The Flash
5th	(United States) Ozzie Delisle	EMPR|Noobe	Doomsday
7th	(United States) Jivan Karapetian	FRQ.EMPR|Theo	Aquaman
7th	(United States) Stephanie Brownback	GGA|16 Bit	Catwoman

Tekken Tag Tournament 2
Place	Player	Alias	Character(s)
1st	(South Korea) Hyun-jin Kim	Twitch|JDCR	Heihachi/Armor King
2nd	(Japan) Genki Kumisaka	Twitch.MCP|Gen	Bob/Leo
3rd	(Japan) Akihiro Abe	BE|Ao	Alisa/Miguel
4th	(United States) Jimmy Tran	JimmyJTran	Bryan/Dragunov
5th	(United States) Hoa Luu	Anakin	JACK-6/P-JACK
5th	(United States) Eduardo Rada	Inkognito	Bryan/Bob
7th	(United States) James Garrett	JustFrameJames	Marshall Law/Yoshimitsu
7th	(Saudi Arabia) Muhanned Alseihati	BMNS-13	Hwoarang/Baek
