= Ho Kun Xian =

Singaporean fighting games player

Xian

Personal information
- Name: Ho Kun Xian
- Born: 15 September 1990 (age 36); Singapore

Career information
- Games: Street Fighter

Team history
- 2012–2014: Desperation Move
- 2014–2023: Team Razer

Career highlights and awards
- EVO champion (2013); DreamHack champion (Winter 2015)

Ho Kun Xian (simplified Chinese: 何坤贤; traditional Chinese: 何坤賢; pinyin: Hé Kūnxián; Pe̍h-ōe-jī: hô khun hiân) (born 15 September 1990), better known as Xian, is a Singaporean professional fighting games player. Formerly part of Team Razer, Xian was the winner of Ultra Street Fighter IV at DreamHack Winter 2015. At Capcom Cup 2015 he got third place after being eliminated by eventual runner-up Daigo Umehara. He beat Yusuke Momochi at Final Round 18. Xian plays Gen as his character of choice, as his stances allowed Xian more options. He stated that Gen was a very underestimated character that people have compared to Dan Hibiki and have easily dismissed as weak.

== Career ==
Xian also derived a huge sense of satisfaction whenever he beat his friends and had carved out a name for himself.

His second-placing at the festival convinced him to start travelling to compete around the world. However, his family and friends were not supportive as it was just after his National Service and he was without a job.

He won Super Street Fighter IV: Arcade Edition at EVO 2013.

In 2014, Xian was sponsored by Razer Inc. which allows him to play full-time.

In 2017, Xian was featured in the Channel NewsAsia series, Unusual Suspects, about Singaporeans who have made their mark in unconventional fields. He appeared in Unusual Suspects: The Underdogs which was aired on 7 October 2017.

In February 2023, Xian ended the sponsorship with Razer and became a free agent.

== Personal life ==
Xian was born in 1990 and has an elder brother. The whole family lives in a one-room HDB flat.

== Tournament results ==
=== Street Fighter ===
==== Super Street Fighter IV: Arcade Edition (v2012) ====
- Shadowloo Showdown 2011 - 7th
- Canada Cup 2012 - 1st
- Red Fight District 2 - 1st
- Final Round 16 - 5th
- April Duels 2 - 1st
- Texas Showdown 2013 - 2nd
- NorCal Regionals 11 - 2nd
- Topanga Asia League - 6th
- South East Asia Major 2013 - 2nd
- Community Effort Orlando (CEO) 2013 - 1st
- Evolution 2013 - 1st
- The Fall Classic 2013 - 3rd
- Shadowloo Showdown 2013 - 7th
- ThaigerUppercut 2013 - 1st
- DreamHack Winter 2013 - 7th
- Capcom Cup 2013 - 2nd
- International Video Game Cup 2014 - 7th
- Topanga World League - 5th

==== Ultra Street Fighter IV ====
- South East Asia Major 2014 - 7th
- Capcom Pro Tour Korea - 1st
- Capcom Pro Tour Taiwan - 5th
- ThaigerUppercut 2014 - 3rd
- Capcom Pro Tour Singapore - 1st
- The Fall Classic 2014 - 2nd
- Capcom Pro Tour Asia Finals 2014 - 2nd
- Capcom Cup 2014 - 2nd
- Canada Cup Masters Series 2015 - 3rd
- SXSW Gaming Expo 2015 - 7th
- Final Round 18 - 1st
- Red Bull Kumite 2015 - 5th
- Hypespotting 4 - 5th
- Topanga World League 2 - 3rd
- Street Fridays Season 1 Finale - 4th
- South East Asia Major 2015 - 7th
- Capcom Pro Tour Asia Shanghai Qualifier - 1st
- Sino Duel - 4th
- KO Fighting Game Festival 2015 - 1st
- Milan Games Week 2015 - 2nd
- Capcom Pro Tour Asia Finals 2015 - 4th
- DreamHack Winter 2015 - 1st
- Capcom Cup 2015 - 3rd

=== (Ultimate) Marvel vs. Capcom 3 ===
- Shadowloo Showdown 2011 - 4th
- April Duels 2 - 7th
- Texas Showdown 2013 - 3rd
- Shadowloo Showdown 2013 - 1st
- International Video Game Cup 2014 - 1st
- South East Asia Major 2014 - 4th
- Canada Cup Masters Series 2015 - 3rd
- Hypespotting 4 - 2nd
- Stunfest 2015 - 3rd

=== King of Fighters XIII ===
- Canada Cup 2012 - 1st
- Red Fight District 2 - 1st
- Final Round 16 - 2nd
- April Duels 2 - 3rd
- Texas Showdown 2013 - 1st
- South East Asia Major 2013 - 3rd
- Community Effort Orlando (2013) - 4th
- Evolution 2015 - 5th
- The Fall Classic 2013 - 1st
- Shadowloo Showdown 2013 - 1st
- South East Asia Major 2014 - 2nd
- ThaigerUppercut 2014 - 1st
- The Fall Classic 2014 - 1st
- Final Round 18 - 2nd

=== Street Fighter V ===
- Stunfest 2016 - 5th
- EVO 2016 - 9-12th
- Final Round 20 - 1st
