= Yusuke Momochi =

Japanese electronic sports player

Momochi
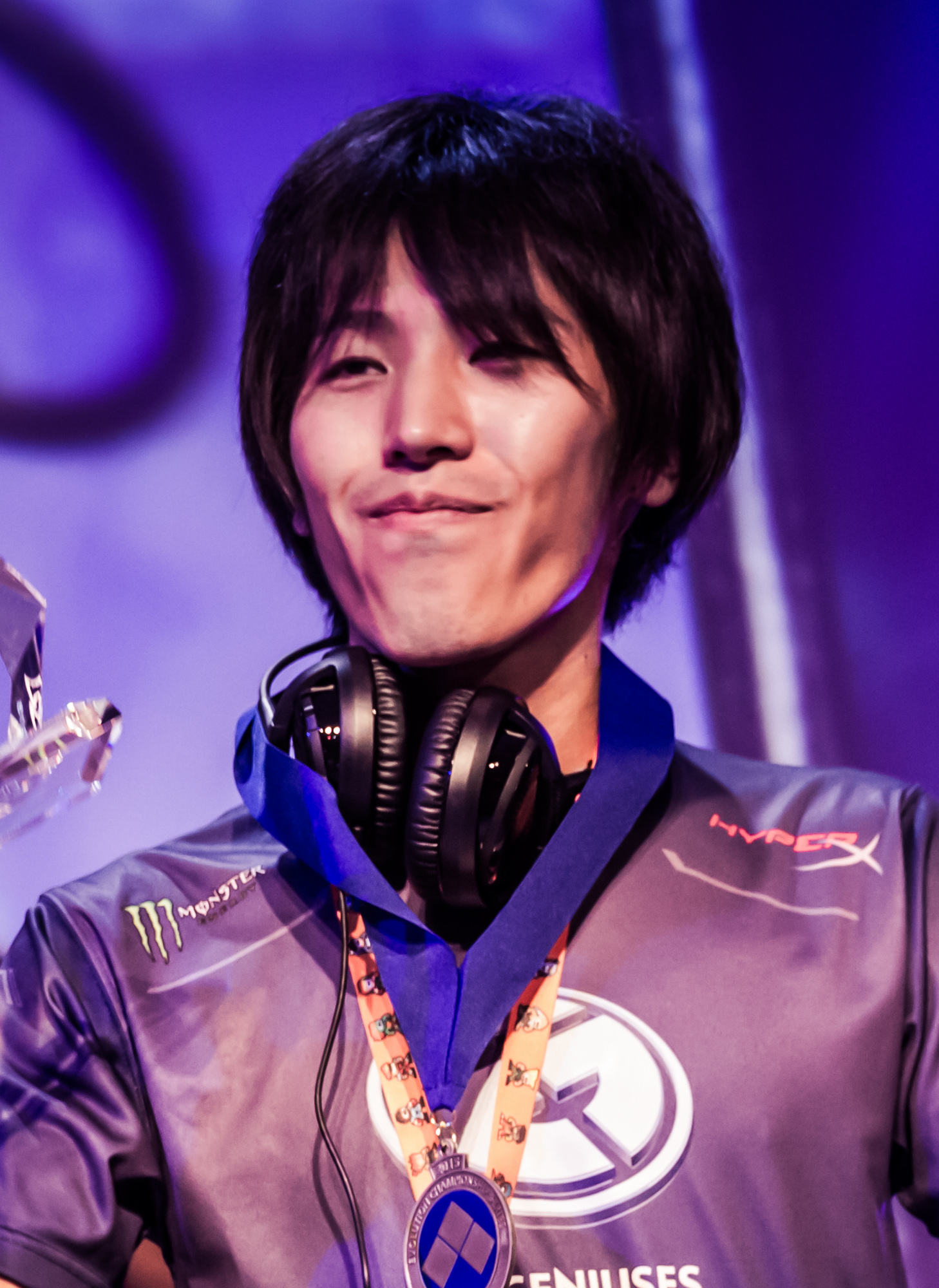
- Momochi at Evo 2015

Personal information
- Name: Yusuke Momochi
- Born: 1985 or 1986 (age 40–41)
- Nationality: Japanese

Current team
- Team: Victrix Pro
- Games: Street Fighter series; Ultimate Marvel vs. Capcom 3; Street Fighter X Tekken

Career information
- Playing career: 2008–present

Team history
- 2011–2017: Evil Geniuses
- 2017–2018: Echo Fox
- 2019–Present: Victrix Pro
- 2025–Present: Zeta Division

Career highlights and awards
- 2× SBO champion (2009, 2010); Capcom Cup champion (2014); EVO champion (2015); EVO Japan champion (2019)

Yusuke Momochi, better known as Momochi, is a Japanese professional fighting game player, particularly of ones in the Street Fighter series by Capcom. Momochi won the Capcom Cup 2014 championship, as well as winning the EVO 2015 title for Ultra Street Fighter IV.

== Gaming career ==
Momochi played for Evil Geniuses up until his contract ended January 1, 2017 and was signed almost immediately by Team Echo Fox, along with former EG teammate Justin Wong and previously unsponsored Topanga partner Tokido. He is part of a team of three — consisting of fellow Japanese players RF and Kindevu — that took home first place at the 2010 Super Battle Opera tournament for Street Fighter 4. He also placed second at one of the final qualifiers for EVO 2011, Shadowloo Showdown. In 2011, Momochi signed with professional eSports team Evil Geniuses along with Ari "fLoE" Weintraub and Yuko "ChocoBlanka" Kusachi. In 2012, Momochi won the UK qualifier for the Street Fighter 25th Anniversary Grand Finals for Street Fighter III: 3rd Strike: Online Edition, Street Fighter X Tekken and Super Street Fighter IV: Arcade Edition v2012. Momochi would later receive 3rd, 5th, and 7th in the respective tournaments at the Street Fighter 25th Anniversary Grand Finals.

In 2014, Momochi qualified for the Capcom Cup by winning South East Asia Major and defeating fellow Japanese player Ryota "Kazunoko" Inoue. At EVO 2014, Momochi received 7th place in Ultra Street Fighter IV by being defeated by French Rose specialist, Olivier "Luffy" Hay in the beginning of Top 8 Losers. Momochi would later win the 2014 Capcom Cup by taking out Darryl "Snake Eyez" Lewis, being put into losers bracket by Ryan Hart, then completely dominated everyone in the bracket and defeated Ho "Xian" Kun Xian, in the Grand Finals. Because of this victory, Momochi was given the first qualifying spot in the 2015 Capcom Cup.

Momochi has been a contender in every Topanga A League tournament. Momochi currently holds 2nd place in the fourth Topanga A League and because of that, he has qualified for the fifth Topanga A League. Momochi is also in the 2nd Topanga World League.

== Personal life ==
He currently lives along with Chocoblanka in Tokyo, Japan but was originally from Nagoya, Japan. Momochi is married to fellow fighting game player Yuko "ChocoBlanka" Kusachi. After Momochi won Capcom Cup 2014, he was thinking about taking ChocoBlanka to Disneyland. He is also a distant descendant of the famous Momochi ninja family of Iga.

== Tournament results ==
Tournament Results

Year	Tournament	Placement	Game
2008	All CAPCOM vs game Olympics	5th	Street Fighter III: 3rd Strike
2010	GODSGARDEN #2	4th	Super Street Fighter IV
2010	Battle Medley Singapore 2010	3rd	Super Street Fighter IV
2010	GODSGARDEN Online #2	5th	Super Street Fighter IV
2010	Season's Beatings: Redemption	2nd	Super Street Fighter IV
2011	Shadowloo Showdown 2011	4th	Street Fighter III: 3rd Strike
2011	Shadowloo Showdown 2011	2nd	Super Street Fighter IV: Arcade Edition
2011	GODSGARDEN #4	2nd	Super Street Fighter IV: Arcade Edition
2011	Battle Medley Singapore 2011	1st	Super Street Fighter IV: Arcade Edition
2011	Season's Beatings: Velocity	1st	Super Street Fighter IV: Arcade Edition
2011	Canada Cup 2011	7th	Super Street Fighter IV: Arcade Edition
2012	Shadowloo Showdown 2012	3rd	Street Fighter III: 3rd Strike
2012	CEO - Community Effort Orlando 2012	2nd	Super Street Fighter IV: Arcade Edition (2012)
2012	Street Fighter 25th Anniversary UK Qualifier	1st	Street Fighter X Tekken
2012	Street Fighter 25th Anniversary UK Qualifier	1st	Street Fighter III: 3rd Strike
2012	Street Fighter 25th Anniversary UK Qualifier	2nd	Super Street Fighter IV: Arcade Edition (2012)
2012	Street Fighter 25th Anniversary Grand Finals	5th	Street Fighter X Tekken
2012	Street Fighter 25th Anniversary Grand Finals	3rd	Street Fighter III: 3rd Strike
2012	Street Fighter 25th Anniversary Grand Finals	7th	Super Street Fighter IV: Arcade Edition (2012)
2013	NorCal Regionals 2013	2nd	Street Fighter X Tekken
2013	NorCal Regionals 2013	4th	Super Street Fighter IV: Arcade Edition (2012)
2013	CEO - Community Effort Orlando 2013	1st	Street Fighter X Tekken
2013	CEO - Community Effort Orlando 2013	2nd	Super Street Fighter IV: Arcade Edition (2012)
2014	Stunfest 2014	3rd	Ultimate Marvel vs. Capcom 3
2014	Stunfest 2014	7th	Super Street Fighter IV: Arcade Edition (2012)
2014	South East Asia Major 2014	1st	Ultra Street Fighter IV
2014	CEO - Community Effort Orlando 2014	2nd	Ultra Street Fighter IV
2014	Evolution 2014	7th	Ultra Street Fighter IV
2014	Isshuu Sengeki Cup 2014	Ultra Street Fighter IV	
2014	Topanga League 4A	2nd	Ultra Street Fighter IV
2014	Capcom Cup 2014	1st	Ultra Street Fighter IV
2015	Shadowloo Showdown 2015	Ultra Street Fighter IV	
2015	SXSW Gaming Expo 2015	1st	Ultra Street Fighter IV
2015	Final Round 18	2nd	Ultra Street Fighter IV
2015	NorCal Regionals	9th	Ultra Street Fighter IV
2015	Topanga World League 2	2nd	Ultra Street Fighter IV
2015	Stunfest 2015	2nd	Ultra Street Fighter IV
2015	South East Asia Major 2015	5th	Ultra Street Fighter IV
2015	CEO - Community Effort Orlando 2015	17th	Ultra Street Fighter IV
2015	Evolution 2015	1st	Ultra Street Fighter IV
2015	SoCal Regionals	13th	Ultra Street Fighter IV
2015	Ultra Hyakkishu Cup	7th	Ultra Street Fighter IV
2015	Canada Cup 2015	3rd	Ultra Street Fighter IV
2015	Topanga League 5A	3rd	Ultra Street Fighter IV
2015	Capcom Cup 2015	17th	Ultra Street Fighter IV
2016	Final Round 19	25th	Street Fighter V
2016	NCR	9th	Street Fighter V
2016	Red Bull Kumite 2016	5th	Street Fighter V
2016	Battle Arena Melbourne	2nd	Street Fighter V
2016	Stunfest 2016	1st	Street Fighter V
