= Evo 2015 =

Fighting game event in Las Vegas, Nevada

2015 Evolution Championship Series

Tournament information
- Location: Las Vegas, Nevada, United States
- Dates: July 17–19
- Tournament format: Double elimination
- Venue: Bally's / Paris Las Vegas
- Purse: $300,000 USD

Final positions
- Champions: USF4: Yusuke Momochi; UMvC3: Nicolas "KaneBlueRiver" Gonzalez; SSBM: Adam "Armada" Lindgren; MKX: Dominique "SonicFox" McLean; GGXrd: Kenichi Ogawa; KI: Jonathan "Rico Suave" Deleon; T7: Nakayama "Nobi" Daichi; SSB4: Gonzalo "ZeRo" Barrios; P4AU: Chou "Superboy" Yamashita

The 2015 Evolution Championship Series (commonly referred to as Evo 2015 or EVO 2015) was a fighting game event held in Las Vegas on July 17–19. The event featured a major tournament for nine fighting games, including the largest Super Smash Bros. tournament up to that point and a highly popular Ultra Street Fighter IV tournament. The Street Fighter IV tournament was won by Yusuke Momochi, defeating GamerBee in the Grand Finals.

== Background ==
Evo 2015 was announced on January 20, 2015, on a livestream by event organizer Joey "Mr. Wizard" Cuellar and Twitch's Mike Ross to take place on July 17–19. The event was held at the ballrooms of the Bally's / Paris Las Vegas hotel and casino.

The event featured a total of US$300,000 in prize money, spread over nine major tournaments. Evo 2015 started on Friday morning, with the finals of five of the major tournaments taking place on Sunday. There were eight official livestream channels on Twitch dedicated to broadcasting the event, the Sunday finals being broadcast on Evo's primary Twitch channel.

== Games ==
Evo 2015 featured a major tournament of nine fighting games:

- Ultra Street Fighter IV
- Ultimate Marvel vs. Capcom 3
- Super Smash Bros. for Wii U
- Guilty Gear Xrd -SIGN-
- Killer Instinct
- Mortal Kombat X
- Persona 4 Arena Ultimax
- Super Smash Bros. Melee
- Tekken 7

Cuellar announced on June 1 that the Ultra Street Fighter IV tournament would be held on the Xbox 360 version of the game, rather than the PlayStation 4 port which possessed a large number of glitches, as well as severe input delay and visual stuttering. Evo 2015 was the final year that Ultra Street Fighter IV was played at the Evolution Championship Series, as Street Fighter V was released in February the following year. The full prize pool for the Street Fighter tournament was set on US$72,270. In late March 2015, Atlus announced that Persona 4 Arena Ultimax would use the technically outdated PlayStation 3 version of the game, as the Asians had an arcade-only balance patch exclusive to their region.

=== Responses ===
Shacknews's Ozzie Mejia described seven out of the nine games as "no-brainers", but stated that Ultimate Marvel vs. Capcom 3 and Super Smash Bros. Melee were surprise inclusions at the 2015 event. The former would be left unbalanced due to Marvel Comics having detracted their license, not allowing Capcom to patch the game. Melee, meanwhile, made a third consecutive Evo appearance despite Super Smash Bros. for Wii U being played on the tournament as well. The game has consistently been popular among the fighting game community since its release in 2001.

King of Fighters XIII was surprisingly absent of the roster in 2015, and both Shacknews and Destructoid noted the lack of BlazBlue after Evo 2014's "legendary" Grand Final as a disappointment. Meanwhile, Evo 2015 was the global tournament debut of Tekken 7.

== Participants ==
Ultra Street Fighter IV was the most popular tournament at Evo 2015, featuring 2,227 registered players. Killer Instinct saw the least registered players at the event, with only 397 participants. Evo 2015 was the largest Super Smash Bros. tournament up until that point, 1,926 players having registered for the Wii U version of the game and 1,869 players registering for Melee, compared with 970 competitors in the Melee tournament of Evo 2014. According to Cuellar, both Super Smash Bros. games had over a thousand registrants within a month of announcement.

Evo 2015 was attended by Jamie Lee Curtis, cosplaying as Vega. Bill Trinen was originally going to compete at the Super Smash Bros. for Wii U tournament, but cancelled at the last minute following former Nintendo president Satoru Iwata's death.

== Tournament summary ==
=== Ultra Street Fighter IV ===
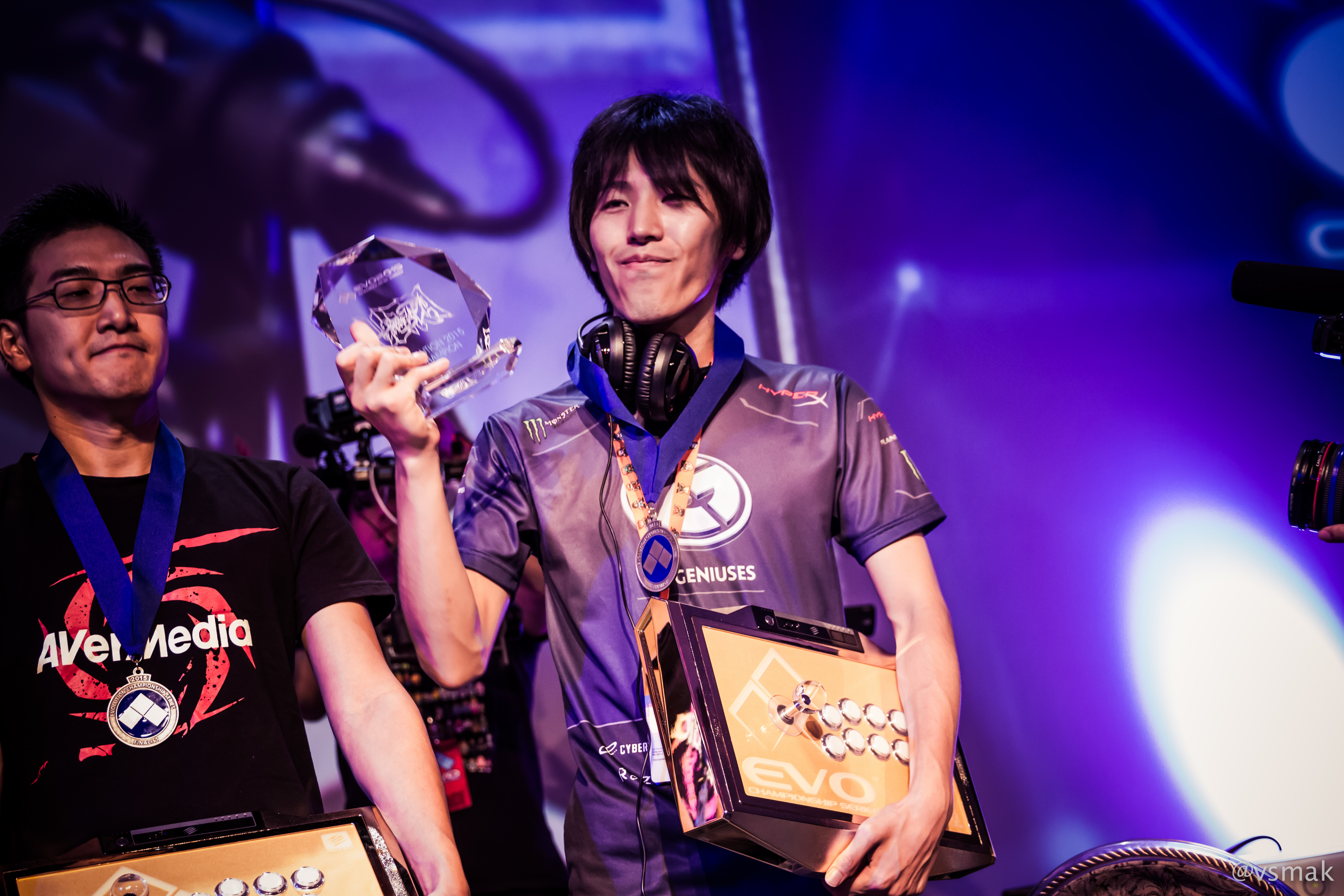
Momochi at Evo 2015

The finals of Ultra Street Fighter IV, held on Sunday, featured GamerBee and Eduardo "PR Balrog" Perez, despite both players already having announced their retirement and didn't expect to make the Top 8. Yusuke Momochi entered the Street Fighter finals after having won the Capcom Cup the previous year, though he did not have much success throughout the start of 2015. Other players in the finals included younger players NuckleDu and Fuudo. A new player, AiAi, surprisingly cracked the Top 8, despite having not a single Capcom Pro Tour tournament win in the 2015 season on his name. Shacknews reported that Infiltration played strong matches against Momochi and Gamerbee, playing with characters nobody knew he had any experience with. Though he lost both matches, they were described as "among the most suspenseful matches of the show."

The Grand Final was held between Yusuke Momochi starting out with Elena and GamerBee with Adon. Gamerbee, coming from loser's finals, managed to beat Momochi in their first game and cause a bracket reset. Momochi switched to Evil Ryu for their second game, a decision that paid off. However, during the second round of their second match, Momochi's arcade controller malfunctioned, as it lost its connection to the Xbox 360 on which the game was being played. As a sign of sportsmanship, GamerBee did not abuse the situation to build up his "Super Meter" for the next round, though Momochi was forced to forfeit the round by tournament rules. Evil Geniuses teammate and significant other Chocoblanka loaned Momochi her own arcade stick, allowing him to continue the match. Momochi managed to defeat Gamerbee during the last round, winning the tournament.

=== Super Smash Bros. ===
Despite its high registration count, the Super Smash Bros. for Wii U tournament was mostly ignored during Evo 2015, its finals wrapping up early on Saturday just as Capcom's Street Fighter V panel was being held. The tournament was won by ZeRo, dominating the tournament without a single loss.

The Super Smash Bros. Melee finals kicked off on Sunday after a high-quality montage video. The competition featured Mango, the two-time defending champion, losing to Hungrybox's Jigglypuff in the loser's bracket semi-finals. Hungrybox went on to face Armada's Fox in the Grand Finals, to whom he lost. Armada became the Melee champion, though Mango was given a standing ovation during the awards ceremony regardless as a sign of respect.

=== Other tournaments ===
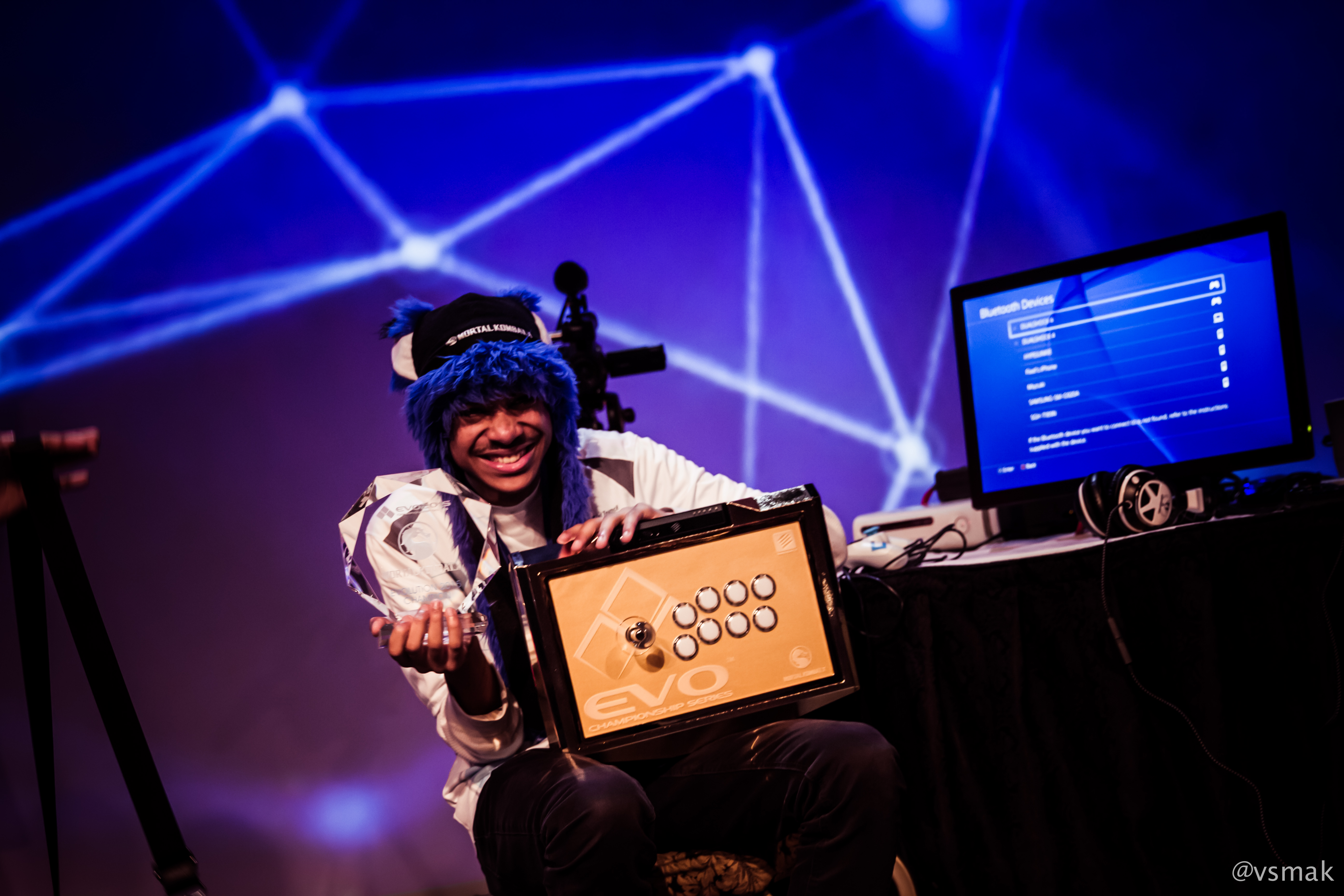
Mortal Kombat X champion SonicFox at Evo 2015

Players Woshige and Ogawa faced off against one another during the winner's bracket semifinals of the Guilty Gear Xrd tournament. After Woshige scored his first knockout, he stood up and celebrated his win, despite not actually having won the whole match yet. This allowed Ogawa to easily beat up Woshige's character in the next round, and he went on to win the tournament.

== Reveals ==
Capcom revealed their eighth confirmed playable character and first newcomer for their upcoming game Street Fighter V, Necalli on the Sunday finals. NetherRealm and Warner Bros. would showcase a trailer for their fourth Kombat Pack challenger, Tremor with a release date that was scheduled two days after EVO.

EVO 2015 was where Rising Thunder, an indie fighting game made by Radiant Entertainment (owned by the Cannon Brothers) would be announced. The game ended service on March 18, 2016 following the purchase of Radiant Entertainment by Riot Games.

== Results ==
Ultra Street Fighter IV
Place	Player	Alias	Character(s)
1st	(Japan) Yusuke Momochi	Momochi	Ken, Evil Ryu, Elena
2nd	(Taiwan) Bruce Hsiang	AVM|GamerBee	Adon, Elena
3rd	(South Korea) Seon-woo Lee	Infiltration	Evil Ryu, Elena, Chun-Li, Decapre, Abel, Juri, Akuma, Ryu
4th	(Japan) Naoki Nemoto	BE|Nemo	Rolento
5th	(Japan) Hajime Taniguchi	MCZ|Tokido	Akuma
5th	(Japan) Tomoya Nomura	/r/Kappa|AiAi	Juri
7th	(United States) Du Dang	TL|NuckleDu	Guile, Decapre
7th	(United States) Eduardo Pérez-Frangie	EG|PR Balrog	Balrog

Ultimate Marvel vs. Capcom 3
Place	Player	Alias	Character(s)
1st	(Chile) Nicolás González	BE|KaneBlueRiver	Hulk/Sentinel/Haggar
2nd	(United States) Raynel Hidalgo	RayRay	Magneto/Doctor Doom/Sentinel
3rd	(United States) Vineeth Meka	ApologyMan	Firebrand/Doctor Doom/Super-Skrull
4th	(Mexico) César Garcia	TA.T3|Frutsy	M.O.D.O.K./Captain America/Doctor Doom
5th	(Japan) Koji Shimomura	TMP|Cross	Zero/Doctor Strange/Dante
5th	(United States) Abraham Sotelo	GoldenBoyNeo	Magneto/Doctor Doom/Phoenix
7th	(Japan) Ryota Fukumoto	RF	Morrigan/Doctor Doom/Vergil
7th	(Mexico) Miguel Osornio	SF.T3|Dizzy	Zero/Doctor Doom/Vergil

Super Smash Bros. Melee
Place	Player	Alias	Character(s)
1st	(Sweden) Adam Lindgren	A|Armada	Fox, Peach
2nd	(United States) Juan Debiedma	TL|Hungrybox	Jigglypuff
3rd	(United States) Kevin Nanney	EG|PPMD	Marth, Falco
4th	(United States) Justin McGrath	PG|Plup	Sheik, Samus
5th	(United States) Joseph Marquez	C9|Mang0	Fox, Falco
5th	(Sweden) William Hjelte	TSM|Leffen	Fox
7th	(United States) Daniel Rodriguez	MH|ChuDat	Ice Climbers
7th	(United States) Jeffrey Williamson	Tempo|Axe	Pikachu

Mortal Kombat X
Place	Player	Alias	Character(s)
1st	(United States) Dominique McLean	cR|SonicFox	Erron Black (Outlaw), Kitana (Royal Storm)
2nd	(United Kingdom) Denom Jones	PND|A F0xy Grampa	Kung Lao (Tempest, Buzz Saw)
3rd	(Canada) Tim Commandeur	cR|HoneyBee	D'Vorah (Swarm Queen)
4th	(United States) Malik Terry	YOMI|MIT	Tanya (Kobu Jutsu), Sonya Blade (Covert Ops)
5th	(United States) Denzell Terry	YOMI|DJT	Kung Lao (Tempest)
5th	(United Kingdom) Ryan Neal	PND|Ketchup	Quan Chi (Sorcerer)
7th	(United States) Kenney Jimenez	YOMI|Zyphox	Liu Kang (Flame Fist)
7th	(United States) Darwin Castro	JLA|Milky Situation	Reptile (Noxious)

Guilty Gear Xrd -SIGN-
Place	Player	Alias	Character(s)
1st	(Japan) Kenichi Ogawa	Ogawa	Zato-1
2nd	(Japan)	ODG|Nage	Faust
3rd	(Japan) Ryuichi Shigeno	Woshige	Millia
4th	(Japan) Takahiro Kitano	Nakamura	Millia
5th	(Japan) Hisatoshi Usui	Rion	Ky
5th	(Japan) Ryo Nozaki	Dogura	Sin
7th	(United States) Joshua Rodriguez	Zidane	Leo
7th	(Japan) Shuuto Hanya	Shuuto	Axl

Killer Instinct
Place	Player	Alias	Character(s)
1st	(United States) Jonathan Deleon	Rico Suave	Fulgore, Thunder, Glacius, Omen, Spinal
2nd	(United States) Neilimen Alicea	Gutter Magic	Thunder
3rd	(United States) Darnell Waller	SleepNS	Kan-Ra
4th	(United States) Larry Dent III	LCD	Maya, Hisako
5th	(United States) Lenin Castillo	UA|MyGod	Sabrewulf
5th	(Japan) Seitaro Ono	Domi	Cinder
7th	(United States) Dillon Maciaga	The Maciaga 5	Sadira
7th	(United States) Kenneth Armas	UA|Bass	Spinal

Tekken 7
Place	Player	Alias	Character(s)
1st	(Japan) Nakayama Daichi	ORZ|Nobi	Dragunov
2nd	(Japan) Akihiro Abe	BE|Ao	Alisa
3rd	(South Korea) Jin-woo Choi	NJF|Saint	Shaheen
4th	(South Korea) Hyun-jin Kim	NJF|JDCR	Heihachi
5th	(Japan) Yota Kachi	Pekos	King
5th	(Japan) Aoki Takehiko	Take	Bryan
7th	(United States) Jimmy Tran	Mr. Naps	Bryan
7th	(Japan) Yuji Kato	ORZ|Yuu	Feng

Super Smash Bros. for Wii U
Place	Player	Alias	Character(s)
1st	(Chile) Gonzalo Barrios	ZeRo	Sheik, Diddy Kong
2nd	(Netherlands) Ramin Delshad	LLL|Mr. R	Sheik
3rd	(United States) Nairoby Quezada	Nairo	Zero Suit Samus
4th	(Japan) Yuta Kawamura	ASA|Abadango	Pac-Man, Wario, Rosalina & Luma
5th	(United States) Samuel Buzby	IQHQ|Dabuz	Rosalina & Luma, Olimar
5th	(Canada) Elliot Carroza-Oyarce	Boreal|Ally	Mario, Marth
7th	(United States) Freddie Williams	GW|FOW	Ness
7th	(United States) Eric Lew	PG|ESAM	Pikachu

Persona 4 Arena Ultimax
Place	Player	Alias	Character(s)
1st	(Japan) Chou Yamashita	KSB|Superboy	Ken
2nd	(Japan) Taichi Ishikawa	NB|Tahichi	Margaret, Yukari
3rd	(Japan) Yusuke Suzuki	Hagiwara	Teddie
4th	(Japan) Ryohei Aguro	Aguro	Yu
5th	(Japan) Koichi Nakajima	Koichi	Aigis
5th	(Japan) Yuji Sasaki	NB|Souji	Teddie
7th	(Japan) Takuya Yoshizaki	NB|Okusan	Sho (Solo), Minazuki (Persona)
7th	(Japan) Yusuke Ikegaya	JEO	Kanji, Shadow Mitsuru
