= Luffy (gamer) =

French professional fighting games player

Luffy (Louffy)
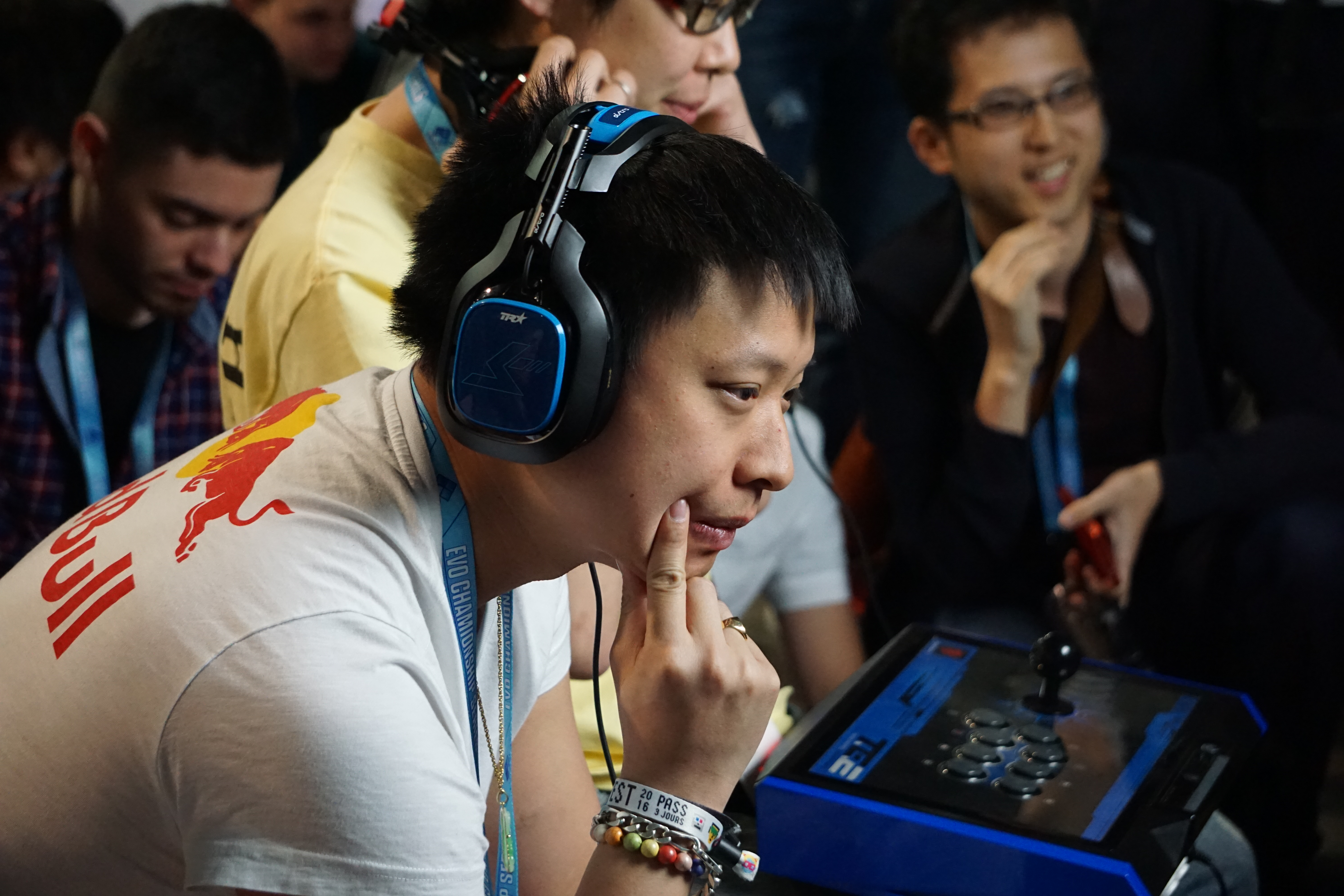
- Luffy at Evo 2016

Personal information
- Name: Olivier Hay
- Born: 1986 or 1987 (age 39–40)
- Nationality: French

Current team
- Team: GamersOrigin
- Games: Street Fighter V; Ultra Street Fighter IV; The King of Fighters XIII

Career information
- Playing career: 2009–present

Team history
- 2012–2013: WatchDaMatch
- 2014–2016: Meltdown
- 2018–2019: Team ARES
- 2019–present: Team GamersOrigin

Career highlights and awards
- EVO champion (2014)

Olivier Hay, also known as Luffy or Louffy, is a French professional fighting games player of Teochew descent who specializes in Street Fighter and King of Fighters.

Hay began his Street Fighter career in 2009. He is famous for being the first Street Fighter IV player to bring the character Rose to competitive levels and also for being the first European player to win a tournament for a Street Fighter game at Evolution Championship Series (EVO), being the 2014 champion for Ultra Street Fighter IV. Hay's reason for maining Rose is because he thinks that she looks attractive.

While he prefers his nickname to be spelt Luffy, some French Internet medias spell his nickname as Louffy to avoid confusion with the One Piece character, whom he took his nickname from. Hay is well known for using a PS1 controller as his controller of choice. Hay has a pet dog named RADIO in which he will dedicate his tournament victories to.

Hay became so dominant in the European Street Fighter scene to the point that he had a tournament dedicated to him called "The Luffy Beatdown Special" in which Hay placed 7th. He left Team Meltdown on January 2, 2016.

On January 1, 2016, Hay left Meltdown after his strong resume with the team. Hay's reason for the departure was that he was offered sponsorships in advance. Hay has confirmed Team YP as his future sponsorship. His personal sponsor is RedBull and he plays for Team ARES.

== Notable Street Fighter tournament results ==
Hay has ranked well in a number of Street Fighter IV and Street Fighter V tournaments.

=== 2010 ===
Luffy's Rose got noticed for the first time by sending Daigo Umehara to the loser's bracket in the 2010 edition of the World Game Cup tournament series in Cannes.

=== 2013 ===
- World Game Cup 2013 : 5th
- Red Fight District 2 : 2nd
- Paris Full Contact I : 1st
- DreamHack Valencia 2013 : 2nd
- Shadowloo Showdown 2013 : 4th
- DreamHack Winter 2013 : 3rd

=== 2014 ===
- International Video Game Cup 2014 : 4th
- Stunfest 2014 : 1st
- Republic of Fighters 3 : 3rd
- Evolution Championship Series 2014 : 1st
- DreamHack Valencia 2014 : 1st
- VSFighting 4 : 2nd
- DreamHack Stockholm 2014 : 1st
- Red Fight District 3 : 1st
- DreamHack Winter 2014 : 4th
- Capcom Cup 2014 : 3rd

=== 2015 ===
- Sonic Boom 2015 : 5th
- Red Bull Kumite 2015 : 9th
- Hypespotting 4 : 3rd
- FFM Rumble 2015 : 1st
- DreamHack Summer 2015 : 1st
- VSFighting 5 : 1st
- DreamHack London 2015 : 5th
- EGX 2015 : 1st
- Red Fight District 4 : 1st
- Milan Games Week 2015 : 5th
- Street Grand Battle 2015 : 5th
- DreamHack Winter 2015 : 2nd
- Capcom Cup 2015 : 9th

=== 2016 ===
- Stunfest 2016 - 13th
- Dreamhack Summer 2016 - 5th

=== 2017 ===
- France Cup - 1st (representing Team Courbevoie with CCL, Evans, Genius and Valmaster)

=== 2018 ===
- Evolution Championship Series 2018 : 5th

== Notable King of Fighters XIII tournament results ==
Hay has ranked well in a number of King of Fighters XIII tournaments.

=== 2013 ===
- World Game Cup 2013 : 4th
- Red Fight District 2 : 4th
- Shadowloo Showdown 2013 : 3rd

=== 2014 ===
- Stunfest 2014 : 3rd
- Republic of Fighters 3 : 3rd

=== 2015 ===
- Hypespotting 4 : 2nd
