= Fuudo =

Japanese electronic sports player (born 1985)

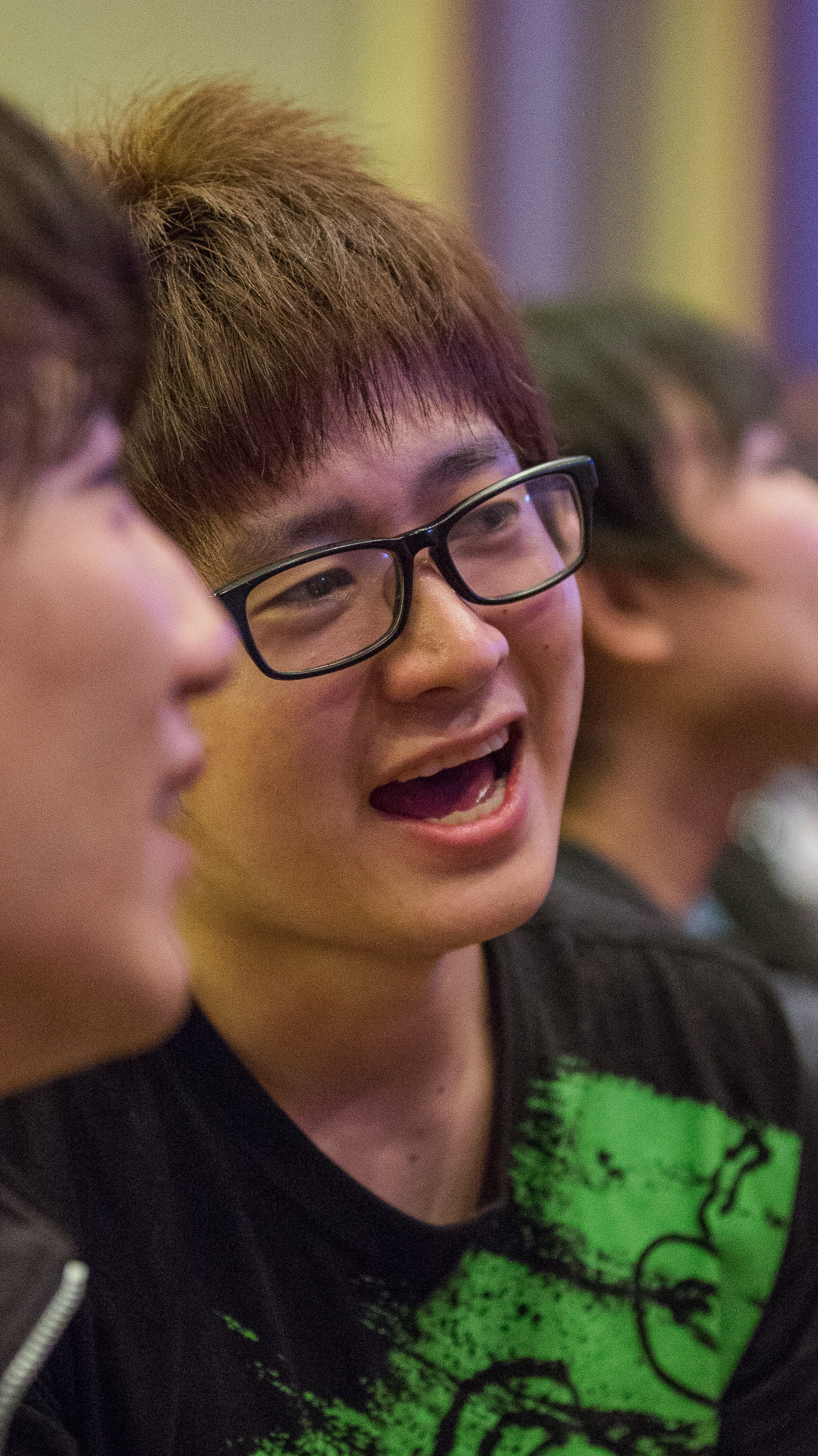
- Fuudo at EVO 2012

Personal information
- Name: Keita Ai
- Born: November 7, 1985 (age 41); Chiba Prefecture, Japan
- Nationality: Japanese

Current team
- Team: Mildom Beast
- Game: Street Fighter V

Career information
- Games: Virtua Fighter 4; Street Fighter IV; Street Fighter V; Street Fighter 6
- Playing career: 2005–present

Team history
- 2012–2018: Team Razer
- 2018–present: Mildom Beast

Career highlights and awards
- 2× SBO champion (2008, 2012); WCG champion (2009); 2× EVO champion (2011, 2012)

Keita Ai (Japanese: 阿井 慶太), better known as Fuudo (ふ〜ど), is a Japanese electronic sports player specializing in the Street Fighter series. Fuudo entered the fighting game scene in 2005 playing Virtua Fighter 4. Fuudo has won various fighting game tournaments, including the World Cyber Games and Evolution Championship Series. Fuudo has been described by multiple journalists as the world's best R. Mika player.

== Career ==
Fuudo first appeared on the larger fighting game scene at the Virtua Fighter 4 tournament at the 2005 World Cyber Games. Fuudo came first place in Virtua Fighter 4 at Super Battle Opera that same year, and first took gold at the World Cyber Games in 2009 before permanently switching to Street Fighter IV.

Fuudo entered the Super Street Fighter IV tournament at the 2011 Evolution Championship without much attention, but according to Red Bull's Pete Dreyer, "rampaged through the competition, displaying incredibly solid fundamentals and perfect execution," beating players such as Xian and Poongko. Fuudo defeated Latif's Crimson Viper in the finale in only three matches, making him the overall winner of the tournament.

In April 2012, Fuudo and colleague fighting game player Itazan accepted a sponsorship deal with American company Razer Inc. in order to design and create an arcade fighting stick peripheral and to compete for Team Razer from that point onward. According to Fuudo, he accepted the deal in order to be able to travel to more tournaments and meet more international players. Robert Krakoff, president of Razer USA, stated that he brought the two veteran players in because the fighting game scene was booming in the United States at the time and described the input of Fuudo and Itazan for the "Razer Arcade Stick" as "priceless".

Fuudo has not won any major tournaments since reaching first place at Topanga League 2 in 2012, though has reached high placings at tournaments such as DreamHack and Stunfest. Having hit ninth place at Tokyo Game Show 2015, Fuudo almost ran out of chances to qualify for the 2015 Capcom Cup, though he qualified when he reached second place at the 2015 KO Fighting Game Festival by beating Latif's Crimson Viper again, though he lost to Xian in the finale.

During the Street Fighter V finale at Evolution Championship 2016, Fuudo lost against Infiltration, making second place. Playing R. Mika against Infiltration's Nash, Fuudo was able to win against him and send him to the loser's bracket in the first round of the top 8. The two met each other again in the grand final, in which Infiltration managed to counter all of Fuudo's techniques.

Following the release of Street Fighter 6, Fuudo won the Capcom Pro Tour World Warrior Japan Regional Finals.

== Personal life ==
Fuudo is married to the gravure idol and tarento Yuka Kuramochi. He has one child, a son named Minato.

== Notable tournament placings ==
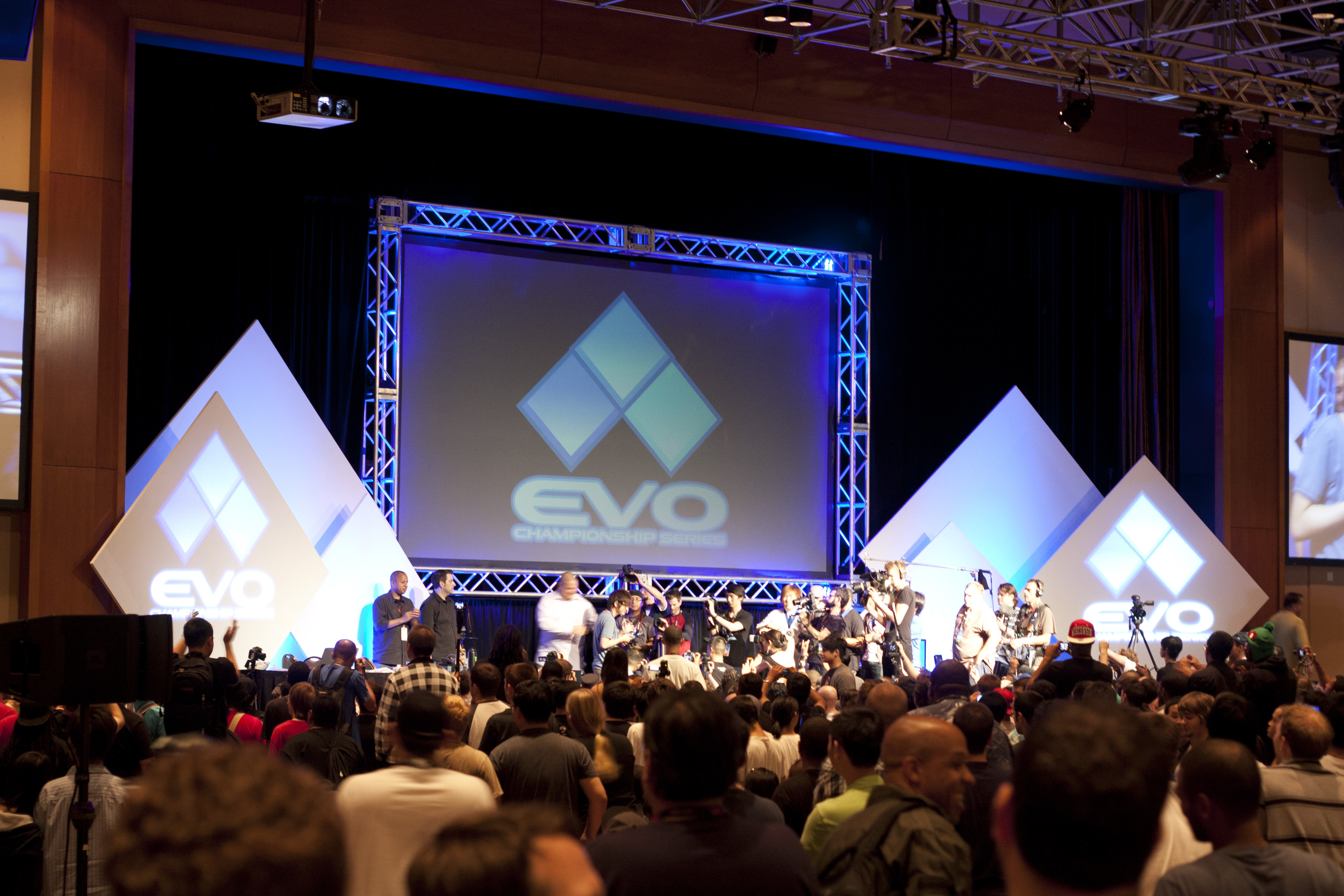
Fuudo at the Evo 2011 award ceremony

| Year | Tournament | Game | Place | Character | Citations |
|---|---|---|---|---|---|
| 2005 | (Japan) Tougeki – Super Battle Opera 2005 | Virtua Fighter 4 | 1st | Lion Rafale | |
| 2009 | (China) World Cyber Games 2009 | Virtua Fighter 4 | 1st | Lion Rafale | |
| 2011 | (United States) EVO 2011 | Super Street Fighter IV: Arcade Edition | 1st | Fei Long | |
| 2012 | (United States) EVO 2012 | Virtua Fighter 5 | 1st | Shun | |
| 2014 | (United States) Capcom Cup 2014 | Ultra Street Fighter IV | 7th | Fei Long | |
| 2016 | (United States) DreamHack Summer 2016 | Street Fighter V | 2nd | R. Mika | |
| 2016 | (France) Stunfest 2016 | Street Fighter V | 2nd | R. Mika | |
| 2016 | (China) G-League | Street Fighter V | 4th | R. Mika | |
| 2016 | (United States) EVO 2016 | Street Fighter V | 2nd | R. Mika | |
| 2018 | (United States) EVO 2018 | Street Fighter V | 3rd | R. Mika | |
| 2022 | (Japan) Topanga Championship 4 2022 | Street Fighter V: Champion Edition | 1st | Poison, R. Mika, Birdie | |

== Acknowledgements ==
Fuudo has been described as the best R. Mika player in the world by ESPN's Tyler Erzberger and Timothy Lee, the latter stating that "his defensive and smothering style is perfect for large tournaments because he forces his opponent in a corner where they have no choice but to make mistakes." Chelsea Stark of Mashable similarly stated that, during his performance at Evo 2016, "Fuudo's play took Mika to her extreme, as she relentlessly chased down opponents and pummeled them in a corner round after round." Red Bull's Pete Dreyer estimated in February 2016 that Fuudo had earned US$55,110.09 worth of prize money throughout his career, putting him among the highest earning Street Fighter players.
