= Ryan Hart =

British fighting game player

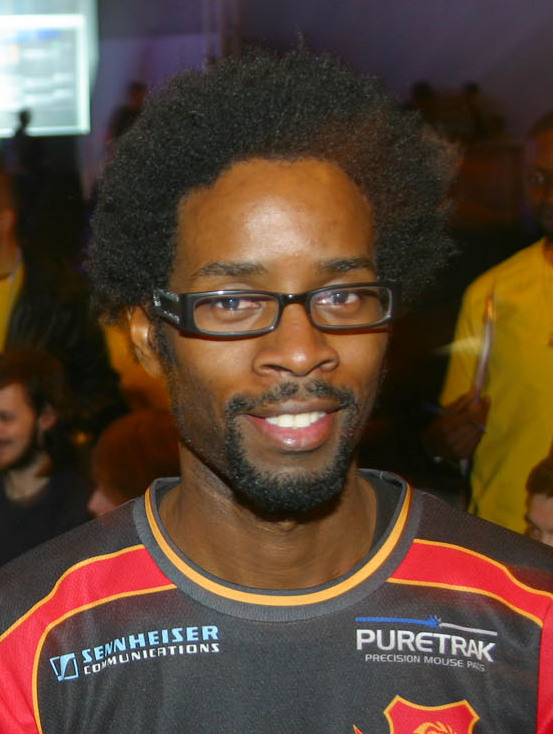
- Hart in 2010

Personal information
- Nicknames: Prodigal Son; Tsuujin; The Terminator
- Born: February 6, 1979 (age 47); South West London, England
- Nationality: English

Career information
- Games: The King of Fighters, Tekken, Street Fighter, Virtua Fighter
- Playing career: 1994–present

Ryan Joseph Hart, also known as Prodigal Son, Tsuujin, Robotnik, The Terminator and NeriahSensei, is a British professional fighting game player. He specialises in 2D and 3D fighter games released by Capcom, Bandai Namco, Sega, Midway, NetherRealm Studios and SNK. Ryan holds numerous National, European and World titles and has won the Evolution Championships twice in Tekken and placed in the top eight multiple times in the same series. Hart also holds four world records within the Guinness World Record's for most international Street Fighter competition wins, most well-travelled fighting game champion, the longest winning streak on Street Fighter IV, and the most consecutive opponents on Street Fighter V. While Hart is predominantly known for his professional gaming career, he is also a commentator, tournament organiser, author, presenter, event host, model, translator and content creator.

== Early life ==
Hart was born and raised in South West London. At the age of 10 he visited his local arcade at a mini cab station, it was here that he was first introduced to his first arcade action game, Golden Axe. A year later he discovered the fighting games Street Fighter and Street Smart. When amusement arcades grew in popularity within the UK, Hart became a frequent visitor to the different arcades located around his local area, where he started to play Street Fighter and Street Fighter II: The World Warrior, among other games. For a portion of his teenage years, Hart was homeless. During his secondary school years, Hart's family relocated to Croydon in South London, where he frequently visited arcades and began to gain local reputation among classmates and arcade visitors.

== Career ==
Hart has worked in many different areas of the Esports industry, these include (but not limited to) professional player, tournament organiser, team manager, caster, interviewer, consultant, translator, model, coach and content creator.

Outside of Esports, Hart has also worked for many years in the video game industry, for companies such as Sammy Europe, Sega Europe and Nintendo of Europe.

=== Professional player ===
==== Early career ====
Hart's first tournament was for the game Street Fighter II Turbo, held in London Trocadero in 1994, the event was sponsored by Kiss FM. It was also during this time he began to play King of Fighter '94, a year later Hart entered the National King of Fighter '95 Championship hosted by Play 2 Win arcade on Oxford Street, London. Unsuccessful in both tournaments Hart began to visit central London to play with more experienced players, it was there that he was introduced to Tekken and Tekken 2. It was with Tekken 2 that Hart had his first success, entering the Tekken 2 UK National Tournament, where he placed 4th with the character King.

With the release of The King of Fighters '96, Hart entered the National King of Fighters 96' Championship on 22 December 1996. This was the first competition that Hart won, defeating the player Motohide Nishio in the grand finals thus cementing his name among the King of Fighters community. Hart began to explore other fighting games, having huge success with Sega's Virtua Fighter 3, winning nine championships in a row at the Namco Wonderpark on 6, 7 and 8 June 1997, which was located on Great Windmill Street in Central London. With the release of Tekken 3, Hart trained heavily with his Tekken 2 background and went back and forth in arcades with other top players including Sho Hiraki from Japan, who was living in the UK at the time. Hart became the UK national champion defeating Sho Hiraki along his path in September 1997, and even appeared in a four player exhibition on the UK's GameMaster TV show again competing against the player Sho from Japan within the final, which he ultimately lost.

In 1998, Hart won the Ehrgeiz UK championship and a flight to Japan to compete in the Ehrgeiz World Finals, he was defeated but during his time in Japan, he entered and won the King of Fighters '98 World Tournament held at the Amusement Machine Show in Tokyo Big Sight. While still in Japan, Hart placed first in three Tekken 3 tournaments held at Shinjuku Playmax arcade. Adding to Hart's success within Japan, he also placed second at the Virtua Fighter 3 tournament held in Ikebukuro Gigo arcade. After returning to the UK, Hart entered the 1999 Official Namco Tekken 3 World Championship, it was there where he managed to win his second world title and one of the last Sony/Namco collaborated events within the Namco Station arcade.

==== 2000–2010 ====
After the closure of the Namco Wonderpark, Hart began to frequently visit Play 2 Win and Casino arcade within the city of London, shifting his focus from Tekken 3 and The King of Fighters, he started to play Tekken Tag Tournament and the newly released Virtua Fighter 4: Evolution. During the arcade decline within the UK, Hart began to organise tournaments within his own home, Casino arcade and London Trocadero, in an effort to support the competitive fighting game community and share knowledge. The success of these events lead to a weekly ranking battle held at the Casino arcade.

Hart competed at Fuce Championship on 15 October 2000, for the Tekken Tag Tournament console tournament held in Amsterdam, placing first by defeating Sandro Aousdji from Italy in the grand final.

In 2001, Hart competed at the Euro 3 tournament for Tekken Tag Tournament held in Birmingham, placing second. In the same year, Hart flew over to the United States for the first time to compete within the Electric Cancel 3 tournament; Hart placed third within the main tournament due to a faulty controller, but later in the event played against the American Tekken Tag Tournament champion JOP to a first to 26 exhibition, winning 26–21. Hart had great success at the Euro 4 arcade tournament held on 26 July within the Extraball Arcade, Rome, Italy, winning on Tekken Tag Tournament.

Hart came to more success in 2002, winning first place in Tekken Tag Tournament and third place in SoulCalibur II at Absolution UK 2002. 2002 is also the year where Hart won his first Capcom vs. SNK 2, Virtua Fighter 4: Evolution and Tekken 4 tournaments.

Hart won multiple Virtua Fighter 4: Evolution and European Tekken Tag Tournament events within 2003 including Torneo di Napoli, Tekken Tag Tournament (solo) at Euro 5 (also winning Tekken 3 and Tekken Tag Tournament (pair play)) and Toreno di Ancona, thus cementing his name as the best European Tekken and Virtua Fighter 4: Evolution player at the time. This led to Hart entering the Tekken Tag Tournament event held at Evolution 2003 within California placing second, losing to Kim Bong Min in the grand finals. Before the events of Evolution 2003, Hart challenged the Korean and Evolution 2003 champion Kim Bong Min to first to 26, winning the set 26–21, with this win Hart became the first European player ever to defeat a Korean champion on a Tekken game. Hart also had success playing Virtua Fighter 4: Evolution, winning the Warriors Unite Pre-Absolution 2004 event that took place in December 2003, defeating Japanese player Jun within the grand finals. Hart also entered Virtua Fighter 4: Evolution at Evolution 2003 tournament placing 3rd. Hart has gone on to say in an open Q&A interview that Evolution, Street Fighter III: Third Strike, and The King of Fighters '98 are his favorite fighting games of all time.

In 2004, Hart continued to have success within Tekken Tag Tournament, placing first at Torneo di Napoli 2nd Edition and second at Absolution UK 2004. It was also within this year that Hart would have his largest tournament win to date at the famous Evolution 2004 Championship tournament, Hart defeated Unconkable in the grand finals thus taking his third world championship. While at the Evolution 2004 Championship Hart also placed 4th on Virtua Fighter 4: Evolution after he was defeated by the US champion, ShouTime, and placed 5th on Tekken 4 in the same event. The same year Hart took first place in Tekken 4 at Torneo di Fano. Hart also managed to place first within Virtua Fighter 4: Evolution at Absolution UK 2004 defeating Delune within the grand final.

2005 saw a new introduction to the Tekken franchise; Tekken 5. Hart continued to compete and place well within European tournaments, winning the Official Bandai Namco UK Championship then winning Ultimate Tournament Volume 4 within France and achieving 2nd at Torneo Olandese and Olanda 2005, while also still competing within Tekken Tag Tournament with the same placement. At Evolution 2005 Championship, Hart fought his way in Tekken Tag Tournament to the grand finals where he purposely forfeited his winner bracket match for an unknown reason, but still fought his way to the grand final, placing 2nd and claiming his second silver medal from the Evolution Championship Series. 2005 also saw Hart take on a new challenge, Street Fighter III: Third Strike. Hart took the community by storm, winning both the Southgate Showdown and Chasing Dragon tournaments.

In 2006, Hart displayed one of his most dominant years to date by going almost completely undefeated on seven different games and losing only a handful of events. Hart was successful multiple different tournaments for games such as Street Fighter III: Third Strike, Street Fighter Alpha 3, Hyper Street Fighter II, Tekken Tag Tournament, Tekken 5, The King of Fighters 2002 and Virtua Fighter 4: Evolution. Hart continued to be a prominent figure within the Tekken 5 scene within 2006, with 1st place wins at Torneo Roma, Roma, Torneo Francia, Ultimate Tournament Volume 5, Euroslash Poland and a 3rd-place finish at Ultimate Tournament Volume 6. 2006 was also the same year that Hart and his teammates became the first ever Street Fighter III: 3rd Strike European players to qualify for the Tougeki Championship held in Japan, also known as Super Battle Opera, winning the 3 on 3 European SBO qualifier held in France. Unfortunately, one of Hart's teammates pulled out before the Super Battle Opera finals for personal reasons, and Hart's team was forced into a 2 vs 3 handicap match, which they lost. Hart also qualified for Tekken 5 at Super Battle Opera by winning the SBO qualifier held in Stuttgart.

Hart won Torneo Roma in 2007 defeating the player Liquid and also defeated Steve88 in Tekken 5 to win the event on both days. These were some of the last regular events before Namco introduced an update to Tekken 5 entitled Tekken 5: Dark Resurrection, with this new entry, tournaments began to run the newer iteration of the game and Hart transitioned over to compete. He later managed to secure 4th place at Ultimate Tournament Volume 8 and 3rd place at Ultimate Tournament Volume 9. Hart had more success winning Iron Man 2, E-Games Festival and Super Battle Opera European Qualifiers, this also became the third time that Hart qualified for the Japanese fighting game event. Hart also won 1st place at Super VS Battle 2007 for Hyper Street Fighter II and 3rd place at Summer Showdown. Additionally at Summer Showdown, Hart placed 1st on Virtua Fighter 5 and Street Fighter III: 3rd Strike. Hart continued to show winning strides on Street Fighter III: 3rd Strike as he took 1st place at Ranking Battles 4.1, 4.2 and 4.3. Winning E-Games Festival, Iron Man, Netko Finals, Rome Tournament and placing 2nd at CPTL Paris Fighting Festival, Brussels Tournament and Fighters Day 3 hosted by the production company Unequalled Media.

In 2008 Hart would go on to win Evolution 2007 for the game Tekken 5: Dark Resurrection, defeating Paco "Gandido" Vilaró within the grand final to secure his fourth world championship. Hart placed 7th in Street Fighter III: 3rd Strike. And once again placing third in The King of Fighters '98 Ultimate Match at Rebirth 2008. Hart would also go on to win the Tekken 5: Dark Resurrection Giessen Tournament, defeating the Polish champion Devil. 2008 also saw a new introduction to the Street Fighter franchise with the release of Street Fighter IV in Japanese arcades, with this release fighting games quickly became a mainstream genre again and revitalising the fighting game community. During the Battle of Destiny event in 2008, Hart played the American Justin Wong in Street Fighter III: 3rd Strike. At an even score of 1-1, Hart would go on to parry every single hit fron Wong playing Chun-Li and won the round in a similar fashion to the infamous Daigo Umehara Evolution #37 moment. Hart became the second person ever to parry Wong's Chun-Li super during a main stage match.

Hart continued to have success In 2009 for Tekken 5: Dark Resurrection winning Torneo Spagnolo in Vigo, Spain. Within the same year Tekken 6: Bloodline Rebellion would be introduced to the console market, Hart would go on to place 3rd at DreamHack Sweden 2009. 2009 would also be the year that Street Fighter IV was finally released on home consoles, with this release Hart was quick to compete and win multiple tournament such as DreamHack Sweden 2009 in Sweden, Impact 2009, Max Damagermany, Cinemasters Tournament, Insomnia i37, Capcom SFIV National Championship and Capcom SFIV European Championship. He also managed to secure 3rd place at Super VS Battle 2009. Hart also placed 1st on Street Fighter III: Third Strike at Max Damagermany and Super VS Battle 2009.

==== 2010 – present ====
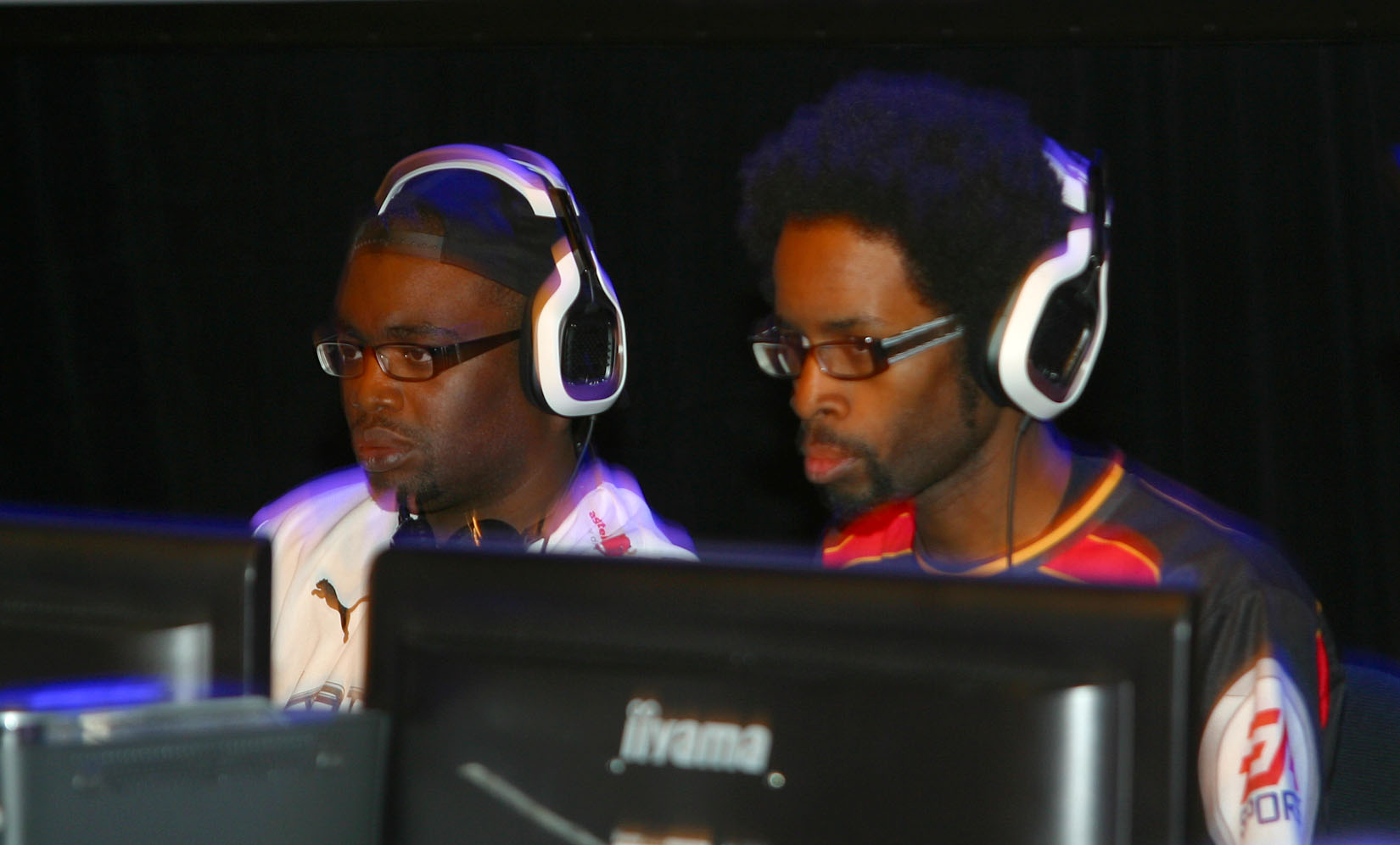
Hart (right) versus Alimi "StarNab" Nabil in the ECL 1 - Liverpool 2010 Street Fighter IV final

With the release of Super Street Fighter IV in 2010, Hart was already considered one of the best players in Europe, continuing to increase his reputation by winning ECL 1 - Liverpool 2010, DreamHack Winter 2010, Beat By Contest Qualifier, Ultimate Clash, Ultimate Clash 2, Winner Stays On League and VSFighting. Placing 2nd at Super VS Battle 20X and 360Gaming twice, 3rd at DreamHack Summer 2010, and 7th at World Cyber Games 2011. Even with the success of his placements within Super Street Fighter IV, Hart would continue to compete within other games such as Super Street Fighter II Turbo HD Remix placing 2nd at VSFighting and 2nd within Street Fighter III: 3rd Strike at Super VS Battle 20X. He would also continue to compete within Tekken 6: Bloodline Rebellion placing 3rd and 4th at World Game Cup 2010 and VSFighting.

2011 saw the announcement for Super Street Fighter IV: Arcade Edition, and with this announcement Hart competed less within Super Street Fighter IV as events faded away in prepare for the new iteration, Hart entered a handful of tournaments; DamaGermany 2011 (3rd), World Game Cup 2011 (3rd), and Beat by Contest 2011 (9th). He also competed and won European Gaming League 4 (Street Fighter III: 3rd Strike), the Winner Stays On League and 360 Gaming twice (Super Street Fighter IV). Hart also managed to secure 2nd at Red Fight District 2011 (Super Street Fighter II Turbo). In June 2011, Super Street Fighter IV: Arcade Edition was released to home consoles and along with it, a new game for Hart to continue his gaming success. Hart managed to win DreamHack Summer 2011 and Super VS Battle 20XI while placing 2nd at DreamHack Winter 2011 and the European Gaming League 4. Hart also managed to place 7th and 9th respectively at Red Fight District 2011 and Canada Cup 2011. Hart would also continue to play Tekken 6: Bloodline Rebellion, finishing 1st at 360 Gaming twice again, 2nd at Canada Cup 2011, 5th and 7th at Max Damagermany 2011 and Evolution Championship 2011, while also placing 2nd at Shadowloo Showdown 2011 for Virtua Fighter 5 Final Showdown. This would also be the year that Hart got his first Guinness World Record for defeating 169 people in a row. Hart accomplished this using the character Sagat, with his fastest victory being just a mere 7 seconds. This led to Hart being featured within the Guinness World Records Gamer's Edition 2011.

2012 was a very busy year for Hart within Super Street Fighter IV: Arcade Edition, he managed to win multiple events; Berlin Campus Party, Ultimate Clash 13, Bushido Impact International 2v2, Proving Grounds 4, EGL 8 2v2, Hypespotting and WinnerStaysOn Xmas Special, while also placing 2nd in four tournaments; Bushido Impact International II, European Gaming League 8, Kuwait Battle Royale 2012 and DreamHack Winter 2012. This would also be the same year that Hart supported the creation of the Esports team Western Wolves, under his Low Land Lion manager, team Western Wolves would become a subsidiary of Low Land Lions, this was due to the manager of Low Land Lion wanting to separate his international players with Benelux based players thus Low Land Lions then became a strictly Benelux based team. Hart who created the name for the new team Western Wolves would also lead the team and was responsible for bringing in new players such as Seon Woo "Infiltration" Lee, Ryan "Laugh" Ahn from South Korea, Femi "F-Word" Adeboye and Andreas Demetriou from the UK. Hart believed these players to have potential, he especially expressed Lee's potential after he visited South Korea and spent some personal time with Lee and Ahn. Hart's belief was proven true as each player went on to be a champion, Lee and Ahn both went on to win Evolution 2012 Championship for the game Street Fighter X Tekken with Lee also taking the title for Super Street Fighter IV: Arcade Edition, Demetriou would go on to win DreamHack Valencia, with Adeboye winning World Game Cup team tournaments and Winner Stays On singles events. Hart's other results would see him placing 17th at Evolution Championship 2012 and Shadowloo Showdown 2012, 3rd at Street Fighter 25th Anniversary UK, 9th Capcom Cup Tokyo Game Show, 4th at Stunfest 2012, DreamHack Energizer, and 5th World Game Cup 2012. Hart would continue to compete and place well within other Capcom games such as Street Fighter III: 3rd Strike placing 2nd at Hypespotting, Street Fighter X Tekken placing 1st at Stunfest 2012, Max Damagermany Europe and Cross Up tournament which Hart won three times in a row. He managed place 2nd at Hypespotting, DreamHack Summer and 9th at Shadowloo Showdown 2012.This was the same year that a new introduction to the Tekken franchise would take place, with the release of Tekken Tag Tournament 2, Hart would continue his dominance within the new title, winning 1st place at Proving Grounds 4, European Gaming League 8, Kuwait Battle Royale 2012 and Insomnia i46 - Madcatz UK Championship, not contempt with competing in so many games Hart won Hypespotting's Virtua Fighter 5 Final Showdown event and came 2nd at Shadowloo Showdown 2012. Hart also had success on Tekken 6 with winning Snake Pit 3v3, coming 2nd at Damagermany Crash and 5th at the Tekken Rules Tournament in Venezuela. Hart would expand his gaming results further by playing The King of Fighter XIII and winning the European Gaming League 8 while also placing 2nd at Hypespotting. 2012 would also be the year that Hart was featured in the Guinness World Records 2012 Gamers Edition book for holding three records within Street Fighter; Most International Street Fighter Competition Wins, Most Tournament Wins in Street Fighter, and the Longest Winning Streak on Street Fighter IV.

Controversy struck Hart in 2012, which would see him temporarily suspended by his current sponsor Western Wolves for a tweet he posted after losing to his teammate MCZ|Mago at the Street Fighter 25th Anniversary UK event stating "Thank you very fucking much Madcatz. Sending Mago to beat his team mate. Great teamwork! Last time I fucking help any of you.", Hart would apologise minutes later for the incident with the tweet "I know everyone likes a bit of drama, but I'm sorry Mad Catz. I just said that out of frustration to my loss. Everyone knows Mad Catz rock!".

Hart was reinstated back into Western Wolves – who were sponsored by Madcatz, after only a month of suspension. His first event back under the Western Wolves banner was the Alienware Championship in January 2013, where he won both the qualifier and the finals itself.

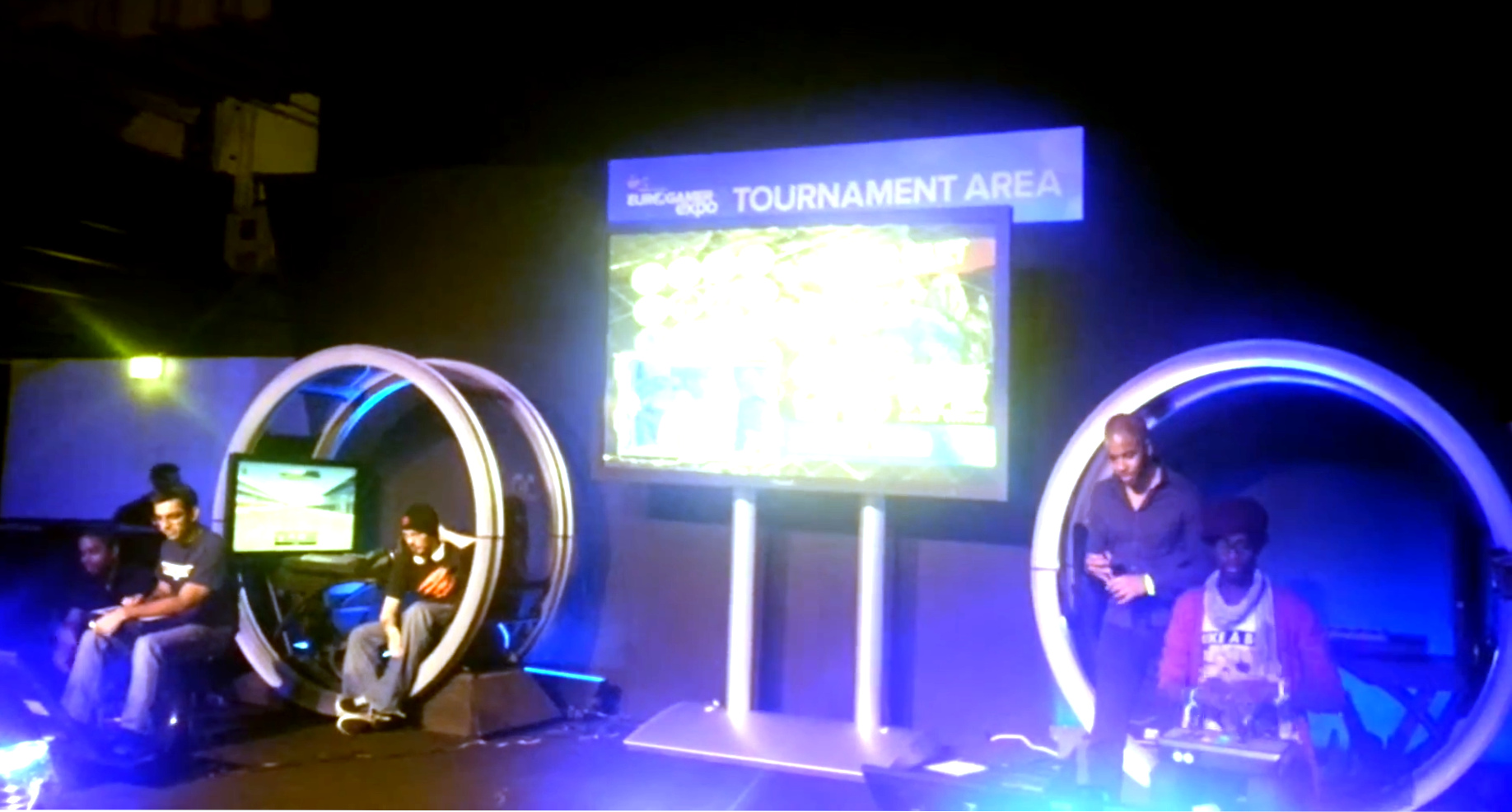
Hart (right) at Eurogamer 2013

Hart continued to be very active within 2013, as well as winning the Alienware Championships Hart also scored wins at DreamHack Valencia 2013, Ludus Magnus Gaming, Paris World Warriors, World Game Cup 3v3, Stunfest 2v2 and Razer Fighting Championships for Super Street Fighter IV: Arcade Edition. Along with these victories, Hart placed 2nd at a number of different events such as Da Ultimate Crushing, Final Round 16, Treta Aftermath, Wednesday Night Fights, DreamHack Valencia and VSFighting 3. His other results would be DreamHack Winter 2013 (5th), Capcom Cup UK Play Expo (3rd), Community Effort Orlando 2013 (12th), VXG 2013 (5th), Evolution Championship 2013 (33rd), DreamHack Summer 2013 (3rd), Paris World Warriors - 2v2 (3rd), Stunfest 2013 (4th) and World Game Cup 2013 (7th). This year would also see Hart continuing with his victories within Tekken Tag Tournament 2, winning VSFighting 3, IGN Con Bahrain and Treta Aftermath, Super Street Fighter II Turbo winning VSFighting 3, and placing 2nd in Super Turbo Sunday V and VSFighting 3 2v2 event, along with placing 3rd for Super Street Fighter II Turbo HD Remix at Electronic Dojo @ Play Expo. Hart would also win competitions in The King of Fighters XIII at 360 Gaming and also came 3rd on Injustice: Gods Among Us, adding yet another competitive game to his list. Hart also competed in exhibition matches held at the Capcom London office in May, dubbed Frame Trap x Capcom FT10, which saw him defeat fellow UK players Benjamin "Problem X" Simon and Andreas. Hart would also find himself without a sponsor mid-way through the year after Team Western Wolves disbanded on 17 August, Western Wolves would officially close it doors on 20 December 2013.

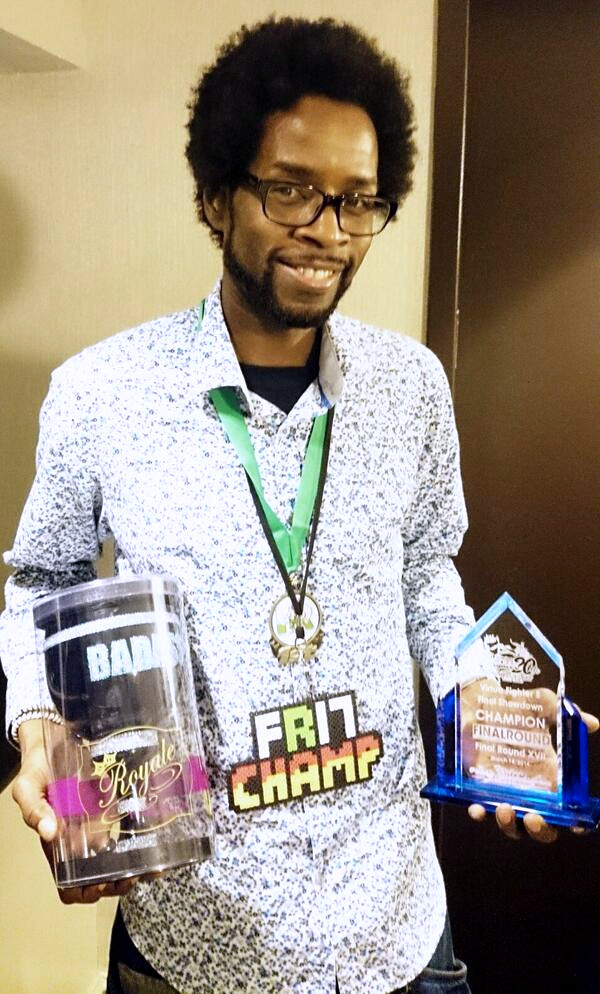
Hart after he won Final Round 17 Premier Event and Virtua Fighter V anniversary in 2014

2014 was the last year of Super Street Fighter IV: Arcade Edition before Ultra Street Fighter IV was released on 3 June 2014, but this did not stop Hart from being proactive within the game. He managed to secure victories at a number of events including but not limited to Ultimate Fighting Game Tournament 10, Warriors Return 3, Republic of Fighter 3 (3v3), International Video Game Cup 2014 (5v5), Final Round XV, Winner Stays On Invitational, Super Vs Battle 2014, Road To Ultra 2014 and Next Level Battle Circuit #71, along with multiple 2nd places at International Video Game Cup 2014, International Video Game Cup 2014 (3v3), Next Level Battle Circuit #72 and Republic of Fighters 3. Hart still maintained great results in other Capcom fighter such as Super Street Fighter II Turbo HD Remix with 1st place at Triple Threat Volume 10, IGN Con Dubai Arcade Cafe Tournament and International Video Game Cup 2014, 2nd-place finish at Gigacon and 4th place at VSFighting 4, Street Fighter III: 3rd Strike winning Shadowloo Showdown V and Triple Threat Volume 10, he then placed 2nd at Proving Grounds 4 and 3rd at Stunfest 2014. June 2014 also saw the introduction of a new sponsor for Hart, with Team Dignitas picking him up which he would only stay with until December 2014 when Team Dignitas left the fighting game scene. In the six months Hart was with Dignitas, he won 20 medals across four continents for the team, leading to speculation of this being the most championships any Dignitas player has ever won within a six-month period. With the eventual release of Ultra Street Fighter IV later within the year, Hart took 1st place at Warriors Return 3, Bracket Reset, Gigacon (2v2), Keep It Classy and Triple Threat Volume 10, while placing 2nd at Street Grand Battle 2014, DreamHack Valencia 2014, ROF, Ultimate Fighting Game Tournament 10, Shadowloo Showdown V, DreamHack Stockholm 2014, Hypespotting 3 and The Luffy Beatdown Special. Hart still managed to compete within different titles at events winning Tekken Tag Tournament 2 at IGN Con Dubai, International Video Game Cup 2014 and Hypespotting 3 while obtaining 3rd-place finishes at Wednesday Night Fights on both Tekken Tag Tournament 2 and Ultra Street Fighter IV. Hart also had a 4th-place finish at VSFighting 4, a 2nd-place finish at Hypespotting 3 for The King of Fighters XIII and competing in his last Virtua Fighter 5 Final Showdown tournaments with 1st place victories at International Video Game Cup 2014 and Final Round XVII.

2015 would be the final year of Ultra Street Fighter IV being the main game of the Capcom franchise. This did not hinder Hart from competing within multiple events around globe, winning Bracket Reset 21, IGN Con Qatar finishing 3rd place within Topanga Charity Cup EGX 2015, Stunfest 2015 (2v2) and Kakutop League II, along with 4th-place finishes at DreamHack Summer 2015, Milan Games Week, Hypespotting 4, Ouka Ranbu Cup and Kakutop League I. Hart also took 3rd place at Stunfest 2015 Street Fighter III: 3rd Strike tournament. 2015 would also be Hart's last event for Tekken Tag Tournament 2 taking 1st place at Canada Cup.

Street Fighter V released in 2016, with Hart being active during the first year of the new games' release, winning Bracket Reset 59, Take TV Take's Dojo and Fight Club NRW. He placed second at Lockdown 2016, EGX 2016 and Paris Games Week Invitational. Hart secured 3rd and 4th place at Kuwait Battle Royale 2016, Celtic Throwdown 2016, VSFighting 2016, and Cannes Winter Clash 2016.

Hart started to focus more on his private life and this led him competing a lot less than he had previously at this point, but also allowed him to be more active within different areas of the Esports industry. In 2017 he only entered a handful of events for Street Fighter V with his best result being 1st at Take TV Weekly, Meltdown Weekly and Greek Empire Tournament, additionally Hart placed 3rd at TakeDojo X-Mas 2017. within this same year, Hart casually picked up the new Bandai Namco game; Tekken 7, where he placed 9th at Hypespotting 6.

Hart continues to compete within fighting game events but to a lesser extent as he continues to grow his career within other areas, he still enters events for Street Fighter V and Tekken 7 with his best results of 7th (Tekken 7) and 9th (Street Fighter V) at Brussels Challenge Major 2018, Headstomper 2018 and Fight Club NRW 2018.

=== Team manager ===
Hart has managed Western Wolves as a team leader during the team's run. Western Wolves closed its doors on 20 December making Hart and all team members free agents.

=== Caster ===
Hart has been a caster for multiple different events including Pokkén's Nationals, Black Label ESports Masters, World Cyber Games, Capcom Pro Tour, GamesCom Dragonball Fighter Z Tournament, and the Tekken World Tour.

=== Presenter ===
Hart works as a host and presenter for variety of gaming events, shows and TV such as ESL

=== Content creator ===
Hart works as a content creator for ESL's main products, such as ESL One, IEM and ESL Pro League. Among Ryan's long career within the Esports industry he has had the opportunity to co-author a book and write articles for his own blog and Ars Technica

=== Tournament organiser ===
Since 2001 Hart has also setup and ran many tournaments during his time within the competitive fighting game scene including but not limited to TTT 1 Crackdown, SBO Netko, Chasing Dragon 3s Tournament, VF4 Feet Bribe, 50 Man Trocadeo KO Showdown, 3S Neko RB Season, Prodigal Summit, Namco Station Tekken 5 Bi-Weeklies, USA vs Europe SF4 Showdown and the Venezuela Tour 2012. Hart currently hosts the community initiative Silent V Trigger within Germany to help local players improve.

== Some achievements ==
Year	Tournament	Game	Place	Note
1994	London Trocadero UK Championship	Super Street Fighter II Turbo	Did not place	
1995	Play 2 Win	The King of Fighters '95	Did not place	
1996	Tekken 2 UK National Tournament	Tekken 2	4th	
1996	Tekken 2 Pub Crawl Tournament	Tekken 2	1st	
1996	National King of Fighters '96 Championship	The King of Fighters '96	1st	
1997	Star Player Showdown #4	Tekken 3	3rd	
1997	Star Player Showdown #3	Tekken 3	1st	
1997	Star Player Showdown #2	Tekken 3	1st	
1997	The King of Fighters '97 UK Championship	The King of Fighters '97	1st	
1997	Namco Wonderpark Tournament	Real Bout Fatal Fury Special	2nd	
1998	Namco Wonderpark 2v2 UK Championship	Tekken 3	3rd	
1998	GamesMaster TV Challenge	Tekken 3	2nd	
1998	Tokyo Playmax Tournament	Tekken 3	1st	team
1998	Tokyo Playmax Tournament	Tekken 3	1st	
1998	Playmax Tournament	Tekken 3	1st	
1998	N64 Open Tournament	Tekken 3	1st	
1998	Ikebukuro Gigo Weekly	Virtua Fighter 3	2nd	
1998	Star Player Showdown Volume 6	Virtua Fighter 3	1st	
1998	Star Player Showdown Volume 5	Virtua Fighter 3	1st	
1998	Star Player Showdown Volume 4	Virtua Fighter 3	1st	
1998	Star Player Showdown Volume 3	Virtua Fighter 3	1st	
1998	Star Player Showdown Volume 2	Virtua Fighter 3	1st	
1998	Star Player Showdown	Virtua Fighter 3	1st	
1998	The King of Fighters '98 UK Championship	The King of Fighters '98	2nd	
1998	Amusement Arcade Show King of Fighters '98 World Championship	The King of Fighters '98	1st	
1998	Ehrgeiz UK Championship	Ehrgieiz	1st	
1999	Namco Tekken 3 World Championship	Tekken 3	1st	
2000	Fuce Championship	Tekken Tag Tournament	1st	
2001	Euro 4	Tekken Tag Tournament	1st	
2001	Electric Cancel 3	Tekken Tag Tournament	3rd	
2001	Euro 3	Tekken Tag Tournament	2nd	
2001	Copenhagen Clash	Virtua Fighter 3	1st	
2002	UK Heat Championship	Tekken 4	1st	
2002	Absolution Luton	Tekken Tag Tournament	1st	
2002	Babylon Cafe Tournament	Virtua Fighter 4	1st	
2002	Capcom vs. SNK 2 UK Tournament	Capcom vs. SNK 2	1st	
2003	Warriors Unite	Tekken 4	4th	
2003	Warriors Unite	Virtua Fighter 4	1st	
2003	Evolution Championship 2003	Tekken Tag Tournament	2nd	
2003	Evolution Championship 2003	Virtua Fighter 4	3rd	
2003	Torneo di Ancona	Tekken Tag Tournament	1st	
2003	Euro 5	Tekken Tag Tournament	1st	teams
2003	Euro 5	Tekken Tag Tournament	1st	
2003	Euro 5	Tekken 3	1st	
2003	Torneo di Napoli	Tekken Tag Tournament	1st	
2003	PlayStation Experience	Virtua Fighter 4	1st	
2003	I Love VF Tournament	Virtua Fighter 4	2nd	
2003	Paris Salon de I'Imaginaire	Virtua Fighter 4	1st	
2003	Feet Bribe Volume 2	Virtua Fighter 4	1st	
2004	Torneo di Fano	Tekken 4	1st	
2004	Evolution Championship 2004	Tekken 4	5th	
2004	Evolution Championship 2004	Tekken Tag Tournament	1st	
2004	Evolution Championship 2004	Virtua Fighter 4	4th	
2004	Absolution UK	Tekken Tag Tournament	2nd	
2004	Absolution UK	Virtua Fighter 4	1st	
2004	Torneo di Napoli	Tekken Tag Tournament	1st	
2004	Gamezville TV Challenge	Virtua Fighter 4	1st	
2004	Manchester University VF4 Tournament	Virtua Fighter 4	1st	
2004	Pre-Absolution	Virtua Fighter 4	1st	
2005	Gamers Day 2005	Street Fighter III: 3rd Strike	3rd	
2005	Gamers Day 2005	Virtua Fighter 4	1st	
2005	Chasing Dragon Tournament	Street Fighter III: 3rd Strike	1st	
2005	UK Street Fighter III: 3rd Strike Ranking Battle #4	Street Fighter III: 3rd Strike	1st	
2005	Golden Gunman Southgate Challenge	Street Fighter III: 3rd Strike	1st	
2005	Console League Tournament	Tekken 5	1st	
2005	Neo Empire Tournament 2	Tekken 5	2nd	
2005	Neo Empire Tournament	Tekken 5	2nd	
2005	Tekken Tej Tournament 3	Tekken 5	2nd	
2005	Olanda 2005	Tekken 5	2nd	
2005	Olanda 2005	Tekken Tag Tournament	5nd	
2005	Torneo Olandese	Tekken 5	2nd	
2005	Torneo Olandese	Tekken Tag Tournament	2nd	
2005	Official Namco National Championship	Tekken 5	1st	
2005	Ultimate Tournament 4	Tekken 5	1st	
2005	Evolution Championship 2005	Tekken Tag Tournament	2nd	
2005	Hardedge VF Tournament	Virtua Fighter 4	1st	
2006	Firebug Third Strike Tournament	Street Fighter III: 3rd Strike	1st	
2006	Brussels 3S Tournament	Street Fighter III: 3rd Strike	2nd	
2006	SBO European Qualifiers	Street Fighter III: 3rd Strike	1st	
2006	SBO European Qualifiers	Tekken 5	1st	
2006	Versus 2006	Street Fighter III: 3rd Strike	1st	
2006	Versus 2006	Tekken 5	1st	
2006	Versus 2006	Tekken Tag Tournament	1st	
2006	Versus 2006	Virtua Fighter 4	1st	
2006	Belgian Fighting Tournament	Street Fighter III: 3rd Strike	1st	
2006	Belgian Fighting Tournament	Tekken 5	1st	
2006	Pre-Road to Japan 2006	Street Fighter III: 3rd Strike	1st	
2006	Stuttgart Ranking Battle	Street Fighter III: 3rd Strike	1st	
2006	Stuttgart Tournament	Street Fighter Alpha 3	1st	
2006	Fighters Day 2	The King of Fighters 2002	1st	
2006	Fighters Day	Hyper Street Fighter II	1st	
2006	Torneo Roma	Tekken 5	1st	
2006	Roma	Tekken 5	1st	
2006	Roma	Tekken Tag Tournament	1st	
2006	Ultimate Tournament 6	Tekken 5	3rd	
2006	Euroslash Poland	Tekken 5	1st	
2006	Torneo Francia	Tekken 5	1st	
2006	Ultimate Tournament 5	Tekken 5	1st	
2006	World Games Cup 2006	Tekken 5	1st	
2007	Rome Tournament	Street Fighter III: 3rd Strike	1st	
2007	UK Ranking Battle 4.6	Street Fighter III: 3rd Strike	4th	
2007	UK Ranking Battle 4.3	Street Fighter III: 3rd Strike	1st	
2007	CTPL Paris Fighting Festival	Street Fighter III: 3rd Strike	2nd	
2007	Fighters Day 3	Street Fighter III: 3rd Strike	2nd	
2007	E-Games Festival	Street Fighter III: 3rd Strike	1st	
2007	E-Games Festival	Tekken 5: Dark Resurrection	1st	
2007	UK Ranking Battle 4.2	Street Fighter III: 3rd Strike	1st	
2007	UK Ranking Battle 4.1	Street Fighter III: 3rd Strike	1st	
2007	Netko Finals	Street Fighter III: 3rd Strike	1st	
2007	Iron Man 2	Tekken 5: Dark Resurrection	1st	
2007	Iron Man 1	Street Fighter III: 3rd Strike	1st	
2007	Iron Man 1	Capcom vs. SNK 2	3rd	
2007	Summer Showdown 07	Street Fighter III: 3rd Strike	1st	
2007	Summer Showdown 07	Hyper Street Fighter II	3rd	
2007	Summer Showdown 07	Tekken 5: Dark Resurrection	7th	
2007	Summer Showdown 07	Virtua Fighter 5	1st	
2007	Super VS Battle 2007	Hyper Street Fighter II	1st	
2007	Super VS Battle 2007	The King of Fighters 2002	3rd	
2007	Roman Tekken Tournament	Tekken 5: Dark Resurrection	3rd	
2007	Ultimate Tournament Volume 9	Tekken 5: Dark Resurrection	3rd	
2007	Ultimate Tournament Volume 8	Tekken 5: Dark Resurrection	4th	
2007	Torneo Roma	Tekken 5: Dark Resurrection	1st	
2007	Torneo Roma	Tekken 5	1st	
2007	SBO European Qualifiers	Tekken 5: Dark Resurrection	1st	
2008	Battle of Destiny	Street Fighter III: 3rd Strike	Win 2–1	Justin Wong Exhibition
2008	Battle of Destiny	Tekken 5: Dark Resurrection	3rd	
2008	Genkai Season 2.8	Street Fighter III: 3rd Strike	1st	
2008	Evolution Championship 2008	Street Fighter III: 3rd Strike	7th	
2008	Evolution Championship 2008	Tekken 5: Dark Resurrection	1st	
2008	Super VS Battle 2008	Street Fighter III: 3rd Strike	3rd	
2008	Super VS Battle 2008	Hyper Street Fighter II	4th	
2008	Only the Best Naples	Tekken 5: Dark Resurrection	5th	
2008	Giessen DR Tournament	Tekken 5: Dark Resurrection	1st	
2008	Vienna Ranking Battle Tournament	Tekken 5	1st	
2008	Vienna Ranking Battle Tournament	Tekken Tag Tournament	1st	
2008	Namco Station Nottingham	The King of Fighters '99	1st	
2008	Rebirth 2008	The King of Fighters '98 Ultimate Match	3rd	
2009	Neo Empire UK Championship	Street Fighter IV	2nd	
2009	Neutrons Cinemasters SFIV National Tournament	Street Fighter IV	1st	
2009	Capcom SFIV European Championship	Street Fighter IV	1st	
2009	Capcom SFIV National Championship	Street Fighter IV	1st	
2009	Insomnia i37	Street Fighter IV	1st	
2009	DreamHack Sweden 2009	Street Fighter IV	1st	
2009	DreamHack Sweden 2009	Tekken 6: Bloodline Rebellion	3rd	
2009	Super VS Battle 2009	Street Fighter IV	3rd	
2009	Super VS Battle 2009	Street Fighter III: 3rd Strike	1st	
2009	Super VS Battle 2009	Capcom vs. SNK 2	2nd	
2009	Impact 2009	Street Fighter IV	1st	
2009	Max DamaGermany 2009	Street Fighter IV	1st	
2009	Max DamaGermany 2009	Street Fighter III: 3rd Strike	1st	
2009	Official Namco National Championship	Tekken 6: Bloodline Rebellion	1st	
2009	Torneo Spagnolo	Tekken 5: Dark Resurrection	1st	
2010	Ultimate Clash 2	Super Street Fighter IV	1st	
2010	VSFighting	Super Street Fighter IV	1st	
2010	VSFighting	Super Street Fighter II Turbo HD Remix	2nd	
2010	VSFighting	Tekken 6: Bloodline Rebellion	4th	
2010	World Cyber Games 2010	Super Street Fighter IV	7th	
2010	DreamHack Summer 2010	Super Street Fighter IV	3rd	
2010	DreamHack Winter 2010	Super Street Fighter IV	1st	
2010	360 Gaming	Super Street Fighter IV	2nd	
2010	ECL 1 - Liverpool 2010	Super Street Fighter IV	1st	
2010	Super VS Battle 20X	Super Street Fighter IV	2nd	
2010	Super VS Battle 20X	Street Fighter III: 3rd Strike	2nd	
2010	World Games Cup Masters Series Qualifier	Super Street Fighter IV	1st	
2010	Beat By Contest Qualifier	Super Street Fighter IV	1st	
2010	Exceed	Street Fighter IV	1st	
2010	Max DamaGermany 2010	Tekken 6: Bloodline Rebellion	6th	
2010	World Game Cup 2010	Tekken 6: Bloodline Rebellion	1st	
2011	Evolution Championship 2011	Tekken 6: Bloodline Rebellion	7th	
2011	360 Gaming	Super Street Fighter IV	1st	
2011	360 Gaming	Tekken 6: Bloodline Rebellion	1st	
2011	360 Gaming	The King of Fighters XIII	2nd	
2011	Ultimate Clash 10	Super Street Fighter IV: Arcade Edition	1st	
2011	DreamHack Summer 2011	Super Street Fighter IV: Arcade Edition	1st	
2011	DreamHack Winter 2011	Super Street Fighter IV: Arcade Edition	2nd	
2011	European Gaming League 4	Super Street Fighter IV: Arcade Edition	2nd	
2011	European Gaming League 4	Super Street Fighter IV	1st	
2011	European Gaming League 4	Street Fighter III: 3rd Strike	1st	
2011	Red Fight District 2011	Super Street Fighter IV: Arcade Edition	7th	
2011	Red Fight District 2011	Street Fighter III: 3rd Strike	3rd	
2011	Red Fight District 2011	Super Street Fighter II Turbo	2nd	
2011	Super VS Battle 20XI	Super Street Fighter IV: Arcade Edition	1st	
2011	Super VS Battle 20XI	Street Fighter III: 3rd Strike	2nd	
2011	Canada Cup 2011	Super Street Fighter IV: Arcade Edition	9th	
2011	Canada Cup 2011	Tekken 6: Bloodline Rebellion	2nd	
2011	Ultimate Clash Xtreme	Super Street Fighter IV	2nd	
2011	Ultimate Gaming Championship	Super Street Fighter IV	1st	teams
2011	Ultimate Gaming Championship	Super Street Fighter IV	3rd	
2011	Max DamaGermany 2011	Super Street Fighter IV	3rd	
2011	Max DamaGermany 2011	Tekken 6: Bloodline Rebellion	5th	
2011	World Game Cup 2011	Super Street Fighter IV	3rd	
2011	World Game Cup 2011	Street Fighter IV	3rd	
2011	Beat by Contest 2011	Super Street Fighter IV	9th	
2011	Relentless Championships	Super Street Fighter IV	1st	
2011	Relentless Championships	Mortal Kombat (2011)	1st	
2011	Insomnia i44	Super Street Fighter IV	1st	
2011	Insomnia i44	Tekken 6: Bloodline Rebellion	2nd	
2011	Stunfest 2011	Street Fighter III: 3rd Strike	1st	
2011	Snake Pit Round 4	Tekken 6: Bloodline Rebellion	1st	
2011	Tekken Force	Tekken 6: Bloodline Rebellion	2nd	
2011	Shadowloo Showdown 2011	Virtua Fighter 5	2nd	
2011	Mortal Kombat UK Championship Qualifier	Mortal Kombat (2011)	1st	
2012	WinnerStaysOn Xmas Special	Super Street Fighter IV: Arcade Edition	1st	
2012	Evolution Championship 2012	Super Street Fighter IV: Arcade Edition	17th	
2012	Evolution Championship 2012	Virtua Fighter 5	8th	
2012	Street Fighter 25th Anniversary UK	Super Street Fighter IV: Arcade Edition	3rd	
2012	Street Fighter 25th Anniversary UK	Street Fighter III: 3rd Strike	4th	
2012	Street Fighter 25th Anniversary UK	Super Street Fighter II Turbo	5th	
2012	Proving Grounds 2	The King of Fighters XIII	1st	
2012	[Tekken Generations Tournament]	[All Tekken Games]	1st	
2012	[Negative Edge Ranking Battle]	Super Street Fighter IV: Arcade Edition	1st	
2012	DreamHack Winter 2012	Super Street Fighter IV: Arcade Edition	2nd	
2012	[Tekken Rules Tournament]	Tekken 6	5th	
2012	[Damagermany Europe]	Street Fighter X Tekken	1st	
2012	[Damagermany Crash]	Tekken 6	2nd	3v3 Teams
2012	Proving Grounds 3	The King of Fighters XIII	1st	
2012	Proving Grounds 3	Street Fighter III: Third Strike	1st	
2012	Proving Grounds 3	Super Street Fighter IV: Arcade Edition	1st	
2012	Kuwait Battle Royale 2012	Super Street Fighter IV: Arcade Edition	2nd	
2012	Kuwait Battle Royale 2012	Tekken Tag Tournament 2	1st	
2012	European Gaming League 8	Super Street Fighter IV: Arcade Edition	2nd	
2012	European Gaming League 8	Super Street Fighter IV: Arcade Edition	1st	2v2 Teams
2012	European Gaming League 8	Tekken Tag Tournament 2	1st	
2012	European Gaming League 8	The King of Fighters XIII	1st	
2012	Capcom Cup Tokyo Game Show	Super Street Fighter IV: Arcade Edition	9th	
2012	Bushido Impact International II	Super Street Fighter IV: Arcade Edition	2nd	
2012	Bushido Impact International II	Super Street Fighter IV: Arcade Edition	1st	2v2 Teams
2012	Hypespotting	Super Street Fighter IV: Arcade Edition	1st	
2012	Hypespotting	Street Fighter III: 3rd Strike	2nd	2 vs 2 Teams
2012	Hypespotting	Street Fighter X Tekken	2nd	
2012	Hypespotting	Virtua Fighter 5	1st	
2012	Hypespotting	The King of Fighters XIII	2nd	
2012	Stunfest 2012	Super Street Fighter IV: Arcade Edition	4th	
2012	Stunfest 2012	Street Fighter X Tekken	1st	
2012	Stunfest 2012	Virtua Fighter 5	2nd	
2012	Proving Grounds 4	Super Street Fighter IV: Arcade Edition	1st	
2012	Proving Grounds 4	Tekken Tag Tournament 2	1st	
2012	Proving Grounds 4	Street Fighter III: 3rd Strike	2nd	
2012	DreamHack Energizer	Super Street Fighter IV: Arcade Edition	4th	
2012	Shadowloo Showdown 2012	Super Street Fighter IV: Arcade Edition	17th	
2012	Shadowloo Showdown 2012	Street Fighter X Tekken	9th	
2012	Shadowloo Showdown 2012	Virtua Fighter 5	2nd	
2012	Shadowloo Showdown 2012	Skullgirls	7th	
2012	Shadowloo Showdown 2012	Street Fighter III: Third Strike	7th	
2012	Shadowloo Showdown 2012	The King of Fighters XIII	5th	
2012	World Game Cup 2012	Super Street Fighter IV: Arcade Edition	5th	
2012	Ultimate Clash 13	Super Street Fighter IV: Arcade Edition	1st	
2012	Ultimate Clash 13	The King of Fighters XIII	1st	
2012	Berlin Campus Party	Super Street Fighter IV: Arcade Edition	1st	
2012	Cross Up Gamerbase #3	Street Fighter X Tekken	1st	
2012	Cross Up Gamerbase #2	Street Fighter X Tekken	1st	
2012	Cross Up Gamerbase	Street Fighter X Tekken	1st	
2012	Insomnia i46	Tekken Tag Tournament 2	1st	
2013	VSFighting 3	Super Street Fighter IV: Arcade Edition	2nd	
2013	VSFighting 3	Super Street Fighter II Turbo	1st	
2013	VSFighting 3	Tekken Tag Tournament 2	1st	
2013	Wednesday Night Fights	Super Street Fighter IV: Arcade Edition	2nd	
2013	DreamHack Winter 2013	Super Street Fighter IV: Arcade Edition	5th	
2013	Capcom Cup UK Play Expo	Super Street Fighter IV: Arcade Edition	3rd	
2013	Capcom Cup UK Play Expo	Super Street Fighter II Turbo HD Remix	3rd	
2013	Treta Aftermath	Super Street Fighter IV: Arcade Edition	2nd	
2013	Treta Aftermath	Street Fighter X Tekken	3rd	
2013	Treta Aftermath	Tekken Tag Tournament 2	1st	
2013	Community Effort Orlando 2013	Super Street Fighter IV: Arcade Edition	12th	
2013	VXG 2013	Super Street Fighter IV: Arcade Edition	5th	
2013	Evolution Championship 2013	Super Street Fighter IV: Arcade Edition	33rd	
2013	DreamHack Summer 2013	Super Street Fighter IV: Arcade Edition	3rd	
2013	Razer Fighting Championships	Super Street Fighter IV: Arcade Edition	1st	
2013	Stunfest 2013	Super Street Fighter IV: Arcade Edition	4th	
2013	Stunfest 2013	Street Fighter X Tekken	1st	
2013	World Game Cup 2013	Super Street Fighter IV: Arcade Edition	7th	
2013	World Game Cup 2013	Super Street Fighter IV: Arcade Edition	1st	3 vs 3
2013	World Game Cup 2013	Super Street Fighter IV: Arcade Edition	3rd	5 vs 5
2013	World Game Cup 2013	Virtua Fighter 5	5th	
2013	World Game Cup 2013	Tekken Tag Tournament 2	5th	
2013	Final Round 16	Super Street Fighter IV: Arcade Edition	2nd	
2013	Final Round 16	Vitrua Fighter 5	1st	
2013	DreamHack Valencia 2013	Super Street Fighter IV: Arcade Edition	1st	
2013	Da Ultimate Crushing	Super Street Fighter IV: Arcade Edition	2nd	
2013	Super Turbo Sunday V	Super Street Fighter II Turbo	2nd	
2014	Evolution Championship 2014	Ultra Street Fighter IV	25th	
2014	The Luffy Beatdown Special	Ultra Street Fighter IV	2nd	
2014	Capcom Cup 2014	Ultra Street Fighter IV	5th	
2014	E3 Invitational	Ultra Street Fighter IV	5th	
2014	E3 Invitational	Ultra Street Fighter IV	1st	Edition Select
2014	VSFighting 4	Ultra Street Fighter IV	4th	
2014	VSFighting 4	Super Street Fighter II Turbo HD Remix	4th	
2014	VSFighting 4	Super Street Fighter II Turbo	4th	
2014	VSFighting 4	Tekken Tag Tournament 2	4th	
2014	Wednesday Night Fights	Ultra Street Fighter IV	3rd	
2014	Wednesday Night Fights	Tekken Tag Tournament 2	3rd	
2014	Community Effort Orlando 2014	Ultra Street Fighter IV	9th	
2014	Hypespotting 3	Ultra Street Fighter IV	2nd	
2014	Hypespotting 3	The King of Fighters XIII	2nd	
2014	Hadocon VI	Ultra Street Fighter IV	9th	
2014	SCAN Ultra Street Fighter IV Invitational	Ultra Street Fighter IV	3rd	
2014	Gigacon 2014	Ultra Street Fighter IV	3rd	
2014	Gigacon 2014	Super Street Fighter II Turbo	2nd	
2014	DreamHack Stockholm 2014	Ultra Street Fighter IV	2nd	
2014	Shadowloo Showdown V	Ultra Street Fighter IV	2nd	
2014	Shadowloo Showdown V	Street Fighter III: 3rd Strike	1st	
2014	Shadowloo Showdown V	Virtua Fighter 5	2nd	
2014	Triple Threat Volume 10	Ultra Street Fighter IV	1st	
2014	Triple Threat Volume 10	Street Fighter III: 3rd Strike	1st	
2014	Triple Threat Volume 10	Super Street Fighter II Turbo HD Remix	1st	
2014	ROF #3	Ultra Street Fighter IV	2nd	
2014	ROF #3	Ultra Street Fighter IV	1st	3v3 Teams
2014	DreamHack Valencia 2014	Ultra Street Fighter IV	2nd	
2014	DreamHack Summer 2014	Ultra Street Fighter IV	9th	
2014	E3 2014	Ultra Street Fighter IV	1st	Edition Select
2014	E3 2014	Ultra Street Fighter IV	5th	
2014	Street Grand Battle 2014	Ultra Street Fighter IV	2nd	
2014	Ultimate Fighting Game Tournament 10	Ultra Street Fighter IV	2nd	
2014	Ultimate Fighting Game Tournament 10	Super Street Fighter IV: Arcade Edition	1st	
2014	Republic of Fighters 3	Super Street Fighter IV: Arcade Edition	2nd	
2014	Stunfest 2014	Super Street Fighter IV: Arcade Edition	5th	
2014	Apocalypse in Paris 3	Super Street Fighter IV: Arcade Edition	4th	
2014	Final Round XVII	Super Street Fighter IV: Arcade Edition	1st	
2014	Final Round XVII	Virtua Fighter 5	1st	
2014	Next Level Battle Circuit #72	Super Street Fighter IV: Arcade Edition	2nd	
2014	Next Level Battle Circuit #71	Super Street Fighter IV: Arcade Edition	1st	
2014	International Video Game Cup 2014	Super Street Fighter IV: Arcade Edition	2nd	
2014	International Video Game Cup 2014	Super Street Fighter II Turbo	1st	
2014	International Video Game Cup 2014	Tekken Tag Tournament 2	1st	
2014	International Video Game Cup 2014	Virtua Fighter 5	1st	
2014	Dubai IGN Con Arcade Cafe Tournament	Super Street Fighter II Turbo	1st	
2015	Evolution Championship	Ultra Street Fighter IV	25th	
2015	DreamHack Winter 2015	Ultra Street Fighter IV	9th	
2015	Street Grand Battle 2015	Ultra Street Fighter IV	9th	
2015	Kakutop League III	Ultra Street Fighter IV	5th	
2015	Kakutop League II	Ultra Street Fighter IV	3rd	
2015	Kakutop League I	Ultra Street Fighter IV	4th	
2015	Red Fight District 2015	Ultra Street Fighter IV	9th	
2015	KO Fighting Game Festival	Ultra Street Fighter IV	17th	
2015	DreamHack London 2015	Ultra Street Fighter IV	5th	
2015	Double KO Summer 2015	Ultra Street Fighter IV	7th	
2015	Ouka Ranbu Cup	Ultra Street Fighter IV	4th	
2015	Bracket Reset 21	Ultra Street Fighter IV	1st	
2015	Stunfest 2015	Ultra Street Fighter IV	13th	
2015	Hypespotting 4	Ultra Street Fighter IV	4th	
2015	Milan Games Week	Ultra Street Fighter IV	4th	
2015	Red Fight District	Ultra Street Fighter IV	9th	
2015	EGX 2015	Ultra Street Fighter IV	3rd	
2015	DreamHack Summer 2015	Ultra Street Fighter IV	4th	
2015	Red Bull Kumite	Ultra Street Fighter IV	13th	
2015	SXSW Gaming Fighters Invitational	Ultra Street Fighter IV	9th	
2015	Cannes Winter Clash 2015	Ultra Street Fighter IV	9th	
2015	IGN Con Qatar	Street Fighter IV	1st	
2015	Canada Cup	Tekken Tag Tournament 2	1st	
2016	Evolution Championship 2016	Street Fighter V	49th	
2016	Capcom Cup 2016	Street Fighter V	25th	
2016	DreamHack Summer 2016	Street Fighter V	9th	
2016	Paris Games Week Invitational	Street Fighter V	2nd	
2016	Fighting Game Challenge 2016	Street Fighter V	7th	
2016	EGX 2016	Street Fighter V	2nd	
2016	Cannes Winter Clash 2016	Street Fighter V	3rd	
2016	Cannes Winter Clash 2016	Ultra Street Fighter IV	4th	
2016	FrogByte	Street Fighter V	7th	
2016	Fight Club NRW	Street Fighter V	1st	
2016	FFM Rumble 9	Street Fighter V	7th	
2016	Sonic Boom Summer Edition	Street Fighter V	9th	
2016	VSFighting 2016	Street Fighter V	4th	
2016	Celtic Throwdown 2016	Street Fighter V	4th	
2016	Fighting Games Challenge	Street Fighter V	7th	
2016	Lockdown 2016	Street Fighter V	2nd	
2016	Capcom Pro Tour Online Event: Europe Two	Street Fighter V	13th	
2016	Bracket Reset 59	Street Fighter V	1st	
2016	Kuwait Battle Royale 2016	Street Fighter V	3rd	
2017	FFM Rumble 10	Street Fighter V: Arcade Edition	13th	
2017	Wednesday Night Fights	Street Fighter V	3rd	
2017	Meltdown Monthly	Street Fighter V	1st	
2017	Take TV Zowie Championship Qualifier	Street Fighter V	1st	
2017	Meltdown Bar Fights	Street Fighter V	1st	
2017	TakeDojo X-Mas 2017	Street Fighter V: Arcade Edition	3rd	
2017	TakeDojo X-Mas 2017	Tekken 7	13th	
2017	EGX 2017	Street Fighter V: Arcade Edition	49th	
2017	VSFighting 2017	Street Fighter V: Arcade Edition	17th	
2017	VSFighting 2017	Super Street Fighter II Turbo	5th	
2017	VSFighting 2017	Tekken 7	25th	
2017	Take TV Weekly	Street Fighter V: Arcade Edition	1st	
2017	Fight Club NRW 8	Street Fighter V: Arcade Edition	17th	
2017	Geek Empire Tournament	Street Fighter V: Arcade Edition	1st	
2017	Hypespotting 6	Street Fighter V: Arcade Edition	33rd	
2017	Hypespotting 6	Super Street Fighter II Turbo	2nd	
2017	Hypespotting 6	Tekken 7	9th	
2017	ELEAGUE Street Fighter V Invitational	Street Fighter V: Arcade Edition	17th-24th	
2018	EGX 2018	Street Fighter V: Arcade Edition	25th	
2018	Fight Club NRW 2018	Street Fighter V: Arcade Edition	9th	
2018	Meltdown (bar chain)	Street Fighter 30th Anniversary Collection	1st	
2018	Headstomper 2018	Street Fighter V: Arcade Edition	9th	
2018	Take TV Tournament	Tekken 7	1st	
2018	VSFighting 2018	Street Fighter V: Arcade Edition	17th	
2018	VSFighting 2018	Super Street Fighter II Turbo	5th	
2018	Brussels Challenge Major 2018	Street Fighter V: Arcade Edition	9th	
2018	Brussels Challenge Major 2018	Tekken 7	7th	
2018	Evolution Championship 2018	Tekken 7	25th	
2019	Brussels Challenge Major 2019	Street Fighter V: Arcade Edition	33rd	
2019	Stuttgart City Battle#1	Street Fighter V	1st	
2019	Stuttgart City Battle#2	Street Fighter V	1st	
2019	Stuttgart City Battle#2	Tekken 7	2nd	
2019	DamagermanY 2019	Tekken 7	Win 10–3	FT10 Exhibition match vs RIP
2019	Evolution Championship 2019	Tekken 7	49th	
2020	Saltmine Online League S5#8	Street Fighter V	3rd	
2020	Reddit EU Online Local	Street Fighter V	2nd	
2020	Saltmine League Season VI#1	Street Fighter V	1st	
2020	Saltmine League Season VII #8	Street Fighter V	2nd	
2020	Saltmine League Season VII #6	Street Fighter V	4th	
2021	Saltmine League Season X #4	Street Fighter V	7th-8th	
2021	Saltmine League Season XI #3	Street Fighter V	1st	
2021	CPT 2021 Online Event: Europe West	Street Fighter V	3rd	
2021	Saltmine League Season XI #10	Street Fighter V	7th-8th	
2021	EVO 2021 Online - Europe West	Street Fighter V	9th-12th	
2022	Saltmine League Season XIII #7	Street Fighter V	5th-6th	
2022	Saltmine League Season XIII #8	Street Fighter V	7th-8th	
2022	Saltmine League Season XIII #9	Street Fighter V	7th-8th	
2022	CPT 2022 World Warrior: Germany #1	Street Fighter V	4th	
2022	Evolution Championship Series 2022	Street Fighter V	33rd-48th	
2022	CPT 2022 World Warrior: Germany #2	Street Fighter V	1st	
2022	Saltmine League Season XV #7	Street Fighter V	5th-6th	
2022	CPT 2022 Online Event: Europe West	Street Fighter V	5th-6th	
2022	CPT 2022 World Warrior: Germany #4	Street Fighter V	13th-16th	
2022	CPT 2022 World Warrior: Germany #5	Street Fighter V	1st	
2022	CPT 2022 World Warrior: Germany Regional Final	Street Fighter V	3rd	
2023	Cologne Fight Night #2	Street Fighter 6	5th-6th	
2023	CLS7 SF6 Qualifier #1	Street Fighter 6	2nd	
2023	CLS7 SF6 Qualifier #2	Street Fighter 6	9th	
2023	Cologne Fight Night #4	Street Fighter 6	9th	
2023	CLS7 SF6 Qualifier #5	Street Fighter 6	9th	
2023	C2C EMEA Season #2 Tournament #3	Street Fighter 6	3rd	
2023	CLS7 SF6 Qualifier #6	Street Fighter 6	5th	
2023	Ixion's TIDDI TOURNAMENT:#1	Street Fighter 6	4th	
2023	Cologne Fight Night #7	Street Fighter 6	2nd	
2023	SF6 EMEA Saltmine Tournament #4	Street Fighter 6	7th	
2023	SaltyEU Street Fighter 6 #19	Street Fighter 6	1st	
2023	TIDDI TOURNAMENT #2	Street Fighter 6	4th	
2023	Cologne Fight Night #9	Street Fighter 6	2nd	
2023	SF6 EU Season 2 Event #2	Street Fighter 6	4th	
2023	SaltyEU Street Fighter 6 (Crossplay) #21	Street Fighter 6	4th	
2023	SF6 EU Season 2 Event #3	Street Fighter 6	5th	
2023	SF6 EU Season 2 Event #4	Street Fighter 6	4th	
2023	SF6 EU Season 2 Event #7	Street Fighter 6	7th	
2023	TIDDI TOURNAMENT: #3	Street Fighter 6	3rd	
2023	Cologne Fight Night #12	Street Fighter 6	1st	
2023	C2C | 2BCU | Road to CPT LCQ | Qualifying Madness #5	Street Fighter 6	13th	
2024	SF6 EMEA Saltmine Tournament #4	Street Fighter 6	7th	
2024	Cologne Fight Night #18	Street Fighter 6	1st	
2024	Cologne Fight Night #20	Street Fighter 6	3rd	
2024	Berlin Fight Fest 6 - SF6	Street Fighter 6	1st	
2024	Cologne Fight Night #21	Street Fighter 6	1st	
2024	TNS 9: CEO Never Sleeps	Street Fighter 6	65th	
2024	CLS8 SF6 Qualifier #5	Street Fighter 6	1st	
2024	Cologne Fight Night #45	Street Fighter 6	1st	
2024	Cologne Fight Night #47	Street Fighter 6	1st	
2025	Cologne Fight Night #54	Street Fighter 6	1st	
2025	Seireitei Tournament 6	Street Fighter 6	3rd	
2025	Cologne Fight Night #57	Street Fighter 6	3rd	
2025	Cologne Fight Night #66	Street Fighter 6	3rd	
2025	HFS Play Street Fighter III: 3rd Strike - Team 3v3	Street Fighter III: 3rd Strike	2nd	
2026	NA2 Series SF6 #31	Street Fighter 6	5th	
2026	NA2 Series SF6 #32	Street Fighter 6	5th	
2026	The Jalta League-Override SF6 #42	Street Fighter 6	5th	
2026	Xperion Cologne Fight Night #76	Street Fighter 6	1st	
2026	The Jalta League-Override SF6 #43	Street Fighter 6	1st	
2026	ICFC Tournament Series #2	Street Fighter 6	2nd	
2026	Ultimate Fighting Arena SF6 Ladder Tournament	Street Fighter 6	1st	
2026	The Jalta League-Override SF6 #54	Street Fighter 6	3rd	
2026	The Runback: SF6 Bi-Weekly	Street Fighter 6	5th	
2026	Chip Damage Series #1 SF6	Street Fighter 6	3rd	
2026	NA2 Series SF6 #38	Street Fighter 6	1st	
2026	GenoxZone Gaming Series Qualifier	Street Fighter 6	1st	

== Media Appearances ==
Year	Title	Production	Genre
2018	Street Fighter 30th Anniversary Documentary	Capcom	Documentary
2017	Fox5 News on ESL	Fox 5	Interview
2017	FOOD RUN - Ryan Hart and Zorine te do LA Food Trucks	Yahoo	VLOG
2013	Ryan Hart: How to be a Video Game Master	BBC	Interview
2012	Street Fighter Champion Ryan Hart - Record Holder Profile	Guinness World Records	Interview
2011	More Than A Game Street Fighter Documentary	Pretty Good Productions	Documentary
1998	GamesMaster	Channel 4	Entertainment
