= Adeboyejo =

Adébóyèjọ is a surname of Yoruba origin, meaning "the crown or royalty is at one with chieftaincy". Notable people with the surname include:

- Quincy Adeboyejo (born 1995), American football wide receiver
- Victor Adeboyejo (born 1998), Nigerian-English footballer

== See also ==
- Adeboye
