= VSFighting =

Annual esports tournament series

VSFighting Tournament Series
- Current season, competition or edition: 10
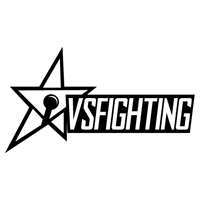
- VSFighting Tournament Series logo
- Sport: Fighting games
- Founded: 2010
- Founder: Lom and Jason "DNA" Reynolds
- CEO: Justin "JustinXavier" Rutherford
- Country: United Kingdom
- Most recent champion: SFVCE: Punk" TK7: Arslan Ash GG Strive: Skyll KOFXV: Arslan Ash DBFZ: Kayne DNF: GO1 TBall: Strykie
- Most titles: Real Menace (3) Ryan Hart (3) Orf (3)
- Qualification: None (open)
- Website: www.vsfighting.com

VSFighting is a tournament series of annual esports events that focuses on competitive fighting games. The tournament is open to all. VSF is the flagship tournament to Electronic Dojo, a fighting games community based in the West Midlands, UK.

== History ==
The first tournament took place in a function room in Birmingham's Irish Club, in 2012 VSF was moved to a different venue and in 2014 VSF hosted the finals live in an IMAX theatre.

The event has been featured as a Premier Event for the Capcom Pro Tour, a Premier Event for the Injustice Pro Series a Master Event for the Tekken World Tour, part of the Mortal Kombat Pro Kompetition, part of the Dead or Alive 6 World Tour and an event on the Dragon Ball FighterZ World Tour. It continues to support a range of fighters, balancing the heavyweight mainstays with side events for other popular fan titles, arcade machines and the occasional demo for unreleased games. The only game to have been appeared at every VSF is Super Street Fighter II X.

=== 2010 (VSFighting) ===
The first in the tournament series VSF and taking place at the Irish Centre, Birmingham on September 12.

Super Street Fighter IV
| Place | Player | Alias | Character(s) |
|---|---|---|---|
| 1st | (United Kingdom) Ryan Hart | Prodigal Son | Sagat |
| 2nd | (United Kingdom) Yota Kitade | Yota | Dhalsim |
| 3rd | (United Kingdom) DC Coleman | Infexious | Bison |
| 4th | (United Kingdom) Wayne Leung | Wywywywywy | Dhalsim |

Tekken 6: Bloodline Rebellion
| Place | Player | Alias | Character(s) |
|---|---|---|---|
| 1st | (United Kingdom) Wing | ObiSamuraidu | Bob |
| 2nd | (United Kingdom) Usman Niazi | Azido | Armour King |
| 3rd | (United Kingdom) Sho Mari | Shimma | Law |
| 4th | (United Kingdom) Ryan Hart | Prodigal Son | Kazuya |

BlazBlue: Continuum Shift
| Place | Player | Alias | Character(s) |
|---|---|---|---|
| 1st | (United Kingdom) Ollie Milne | OlllieMilne | Bang |
| 2nd | (United Kingdom) Scott Harrison | Kaworu | Carl |
| 2nd | (United Kingdom) Kyle Dixon | Kyzertron | *forfeited before match |
| 3rd | (United Kingdom) Ray Law | Bo0 | Litchi |

Super Street Fighter II Turbo HD Remix
| Place | Player | Alias | Character(s) |
|---|---|---|---|
| 1st | (United Kingdom) Joseph Govinden | Orf | Ryu |
| 2nd | (United Kingdom) Ryan Hart | Prodigal Son | Ryu |
| 3rd | (United Kingdom) - | KaosFlare | Guile |
| 4th | (United Kingdom) - | Alan the Man | Deejay |

=== 2012 (VSFighting II) ===
In 2012 it announced that VSFighting II would be help at 'The Public' Birmingham on July 14, 2012. Other notable events included a side tournament of Super Street Fighter II X (Dreamcast) and support from Bandai Namco Entertainment to showcase Tekken Tag Tournament 2 on an arcade machine shipped from Japan.

Super Street Fighter IV
| Place | Player | Alias | Character(s) |
|---|---|---|---|
| 1st | (United Kingdom) Tahaa Ibrahim | CG | Tahaa | E. Honda |
| 2nd | (United Kingdom) Benjamin Simon | CG Problem X | Sagat, Seth, M.Bison |
| 3rd | (United Kingdom) Gin Karra | ED | The Genius | E. Honda |

Ultimate Marvel vs. Capcom 3
| Place | Player | Alias | Character(s) |
|---|---|---|---|
| 1st | (United Kingdom) Ryan Moore | Shuffle | Wesker, Hulk, Sentinel |
| 2nd | (United Kingdom) Laurence Collins | Howtoread | X-23, Viewful Joe, Strider Hiryu |
| 3rd | (United Kingdom) Scott Harrison | Kaworu | Frank West, Nova, Vergil |
| 4th | (United Kingdom) Jarod | Vader | Super Skrull, Doctor Doom, Taskmaster |

Soulcalibur V
| Place | Player | Alias | Character(s) |
|---|---|---|---|
| 1st | (United Kingdom) Richard Newton | Grunt Dude | Xiba |
| 2nd | (Germany) Malte Glade | Dagotth | Pyrrha |
| 3rd | (United Kingdom) Wil Murray | Wil | Voldo |
| 4th | (United Kingdom) Duncan Cartner | Hyrul | Leixia |

The King of Fighters XIII
| Place | Player | Alias | Character(s) |
|---|---|---|---|
| 1st | (United Kingdom) | Shinefist | Iori, Billy, Joe |
| 2nd | (United Kingdom) | Percyinabox | Iori, Takuma, Shen |
| 3rd | (United Kingdom) Scott Harrison | Kaworu | Kensou, Iori, Shen |
| 4th | (United Kingdom) Gavin Ward | Sprint | Mai, King, Athena |

=== 2013 (VSFighting III) ===
In 2013 VSFighting remained at 'The Public', Birmingham, however this was the first VSF to be two day event on August 10–11. Also this would mark August as becoming the annual month for future VSFighting tournaments to be held.

Super Street Fighter IV: Arcade Edition
| Place | Player | Alias | Character(s) |
|---|---|---|---|
| 1st | (United Kingdom) Benjamin Simon | RZR | CG Problem X | C. Viper |
| 2nd | (United Kingdom) Ryan Hart | WW | MCZ Ryan Hart | Sagat, Akuma |
| 3rd | (United Kingdom) Jonathan Parkes | Tyrant | M. Bison |
| 4th | (United Kingdom) Mohammed Alfasi | ED | Chongy/Rudi | Fei Long |
| 5th | (United Kingdom) Alexander Blake | ED | Jinty | Ken |
| 5th | (United Kingdom) Stephen Hutchinson | Hutch USA | Seth |
| 7th | (United Kingdom) Chase Jackson | C7 | Gen |
| 7th | (United Kingdom) Jet Ly | ED | Kyuu/Aixy | Balrog |

Ultimate Marvel vs. Capcom 3
| Place | Player | Alias | Character(s) |
|---|---|---|---|
| 1st | (United Kingdom) Kyle Dixon | Kyzertron | Sentinel, Zero, M.O.D.O.K |
| 2nd | (United Kingdom) Jack Simpson | Cheech Wizard | Doctor Doom, Morrigan, Magneto |
| 3rd | (United Kingdom) Ryan Moore | Shuffle | Wesker, Hulk, Sentinel |
| 4th | (United Kingdom) Laurence Collins | Howtoread | X-23, Viewful Joe, Strider Hiryu |
| 5th | (United Kingdom) - | Spartan Throne | Doctor Doom, Magneto, Dormammu |
| 5th | (United Kingdom) | Tricerabortion | Strider Hiryu, Doctor Doom, Vergil |
| 7th | (United Kingdom) Matt Huang? | MBA | Goukifafa | Akuma, Zero, Sentinel |
| 7th | (United Kingdom) Jacky Chan | ED | Jacky Chan | Vergil, Magneto, Doctor Doom |

Injustice: Gods Among Us
| Place | Player | Alias | Character(s) |
|---|---|---|---|
| 1st | (United Kingdom) Jay Dickson | UsedF0rGlue | Batman |
| 2nd | (United Kingdom) Denom Jones | HATE | A Foxy Grampa | Hawkgirl, Catwoman |
| 3rd | (United Kingdom) Justin Rutherford | ED | JustinXavier | Raven, Wonder Woman |
| 4th | (United Kingdom) Jake Neal | RZR | CG Mustard | Bane |
| 5th | (United Kingdom) Laurence Collins | Howtoread | Hawkgirl |
| 5th | (United Kingdom) Jacky Chan | ED | Jacky Chan | Green Lantern |
| 7th | (United Kingdom) | Karnage | |
| 7th | (United Kingdom) Jay Scott-Joseph | Platinum Kid | |

Tekken Tag Tournament 2
| Place | Player | Alias | Character(s) |
|---|---|---|---|
| 1st | (United Kingdom) Ryan Hart | WW | MCZ Ryan Hart | Kazuya, Leo |
| 2nd | (United Kingdom) Kishan Thomas | Ex-Soldier | Hwoarang, Steve |
| 3rd | (United Kingdom) Gabriel Lawal | Real Menace | Eddy, Lars |
| 4th | (United Kingdom) Tony Mba | Goomba | Jack-6, P.Jack |
| 5th | (United Kingdom) Sho Mari | ED | Shimma | Marshall Law, Forest Law |
| 5th | (United Kingdom) Bilal Iqbal | Shifty | King, Armor King |
| 7th | (United Kingdom) Usman Niazi | ED | Azido | Leo, Baek |
| 7th | (United Kingdom) Layth Al Jawad | Gilgamesh | Kazuya, Heihachi |

Super Street Fighter II Turbo
| Place | Player | Alias | Character(s) |
|---|---|---|---|
| 1st | (United Kingdom) Ryan Hart | WW | MCZ Ryan Hart | Ryu |
| 2nd | (United Kingdom) James Brown | RandomHajile | O. Guile |
| 3rd | (United Kingdom) Mohammed Alfasi | ED | Chongy/Rudi | Zangief, O. Ryu |
| 4th | (United Kingdom) Hao Ly | ED | Haotwo | Ken |
| 5th | (United Kingdom) Martin Herring | UNW4NT3D | E. Honda |
| 5th | (United Kingdom) - | Zero1 | Balrog |
| 7th | (United Kingdom) Usman Niazi | ED | Azido | M. Bison |
| 7th | (United Kingdom) Gin Karra | ED | The Genius | Guile, Balrog |

Persona 4 Arena
| Place | Player | Alias | Character(s) |
|---|---|---|---|
| 1st | (United Kingdom) Callum Stephens | Ravage C | Kanji Tatsumi |
| 2nd | (United Kingdom) | HAO | Kayneh | Yosuke Hanamura, Kanji Tatsumi |
| 3rd | (United Kingdom) Jay Scott-Joseph | Platinum Kid | |
| 4th | (United Kingdom) Hassan-Leon King | HAWXX IS RIPPIN | Mitsuru Kirijo |
| 5th | (United Kingdom) Jay Jeffs | JayLab | Yosuke Hanamura |
| 5th | (United Kingdom) William Ho | SFO|TFC|LBL Willo | Yosuke Hanamura |
| 7th | (United Kingdom) | Sheep | Aigis |
| 7th | (United Kingdom) Ben Salisbury | Zaus | |

=== 2014 (VSFighting 4) ===
VSFighting 4 hosted the first UK Capcom Premier event at Millennium Point, Birmingham on 23–24 August 2014.

Ultra Street Fighter IV
| Place | Player | Alias | Character(s) |
|---|---|---|---|
| 1st | (France) Valentin Petit | GL | Valmaster | Chun-Li |
| 2nd | (France) Olivier Hay | MD | Luffy | Rose |
| 3rd | (United Kingdom) Benjamin Simon | CG | Problem X | C-Viper |
| 4th | (United Kingdom) Ryan Hart | DIG | Ryan Hart | Sagat |
| 5th | (Netherlands) Roy Sommeling | LLL | MBR | Akuma |
| 5th | (United Kingdom) Sean Dench | UM | ImStillTheDaddy | Guile |
| 7th | (United Kingdom) Andreas Demetriou | Andreas | Rufus |
| 7th | (United Kingdom) Rhys Noble | BSC | Blaydon Ryu | Ryu |

Ultimate Marvel vs. Capcom 3
| Place | Player | Alias | Character(s) |
|---|---|---|---|
| 1st | (United States) Kevin Landon | TWITCH | Dieminion | Morrigan, Viewtiful Joe, Doctor Strange |
| 2nd | (United Kingdom) Miles Ross | 1UP Miles | Vergil, Zero, Doctor Doom |
| 3rd | (France) Maël Vautor | CDV | White Black | Doctor Doom, Magneto, Dante |
| 4th | (Netherlands) Bruno Jager | LLL | Doom Domain | Vergil, Wolverine, Doctor Doom |
| 5th | (United Kingdom) - | Spartan Throne | Iron Fist, Wolverine, Dormammu |
| 5th | (Brazil) Carlos E. Lassance | Cudorasaur | Vergil, Wolverine, Doctor Doom |
| 7th | (United Kingdom) Alioune Camara | BCN | Aliqune Sensei | Phoenix, Magneto, Morrigan |
| 7th | (United Kingdom) Sam O Florinn | Mr. O Florinn | |

Tekken Tag Tournament 2
| Place | Player | Alias | Character(s) |
|---|---|---|---|
| 1st | (United Kingdom) Gabriel Lawal | Real Menace | Devil Jin, Bob |
| 2nd | (United Kingdom) Mario Alonso Tufinio | MBA | Roo Kang | Roger Jr, Alex |
| 3rd | (United Kingdom) Aaron Asante | CKT | Azyg4lyfe | Ogre, Lee |
| 4th | (United Kingdom) Ryan Hart | DIG | Ryan Hart | Heihachi, Kazuya |
| 5th | (United Kingdom) Sho Mari | ED | Shimma | Forest Law, Marshall Law, |
| 5th | (United Kingdom) Harry Adams | MBA | Inferno Kong | Ogre, Ancient Ogre |
| 7th | (United Kingdom) Kamen Howell | MBA | Kamen Rider | Asuka, Jun |
| 7th | (United Kingdom) Kai Carty | ED | Xai | Marshall Law, Jun |

Injustice: Gods Among Us
| Place | Player | Alias | Character(s) |
|---|---|---|---|
| 1st | (United Kingdom) Reece Gill | OMD | Omega K | Bane |
| 2nd | (United Kingdom) Adam Cartwright | Undead Jim | Aquaman |
| 3rd | (United Kingdom) Okechi Williams | PND | i2 Guag3 | Superman, Doomsday, Black Adam |
| 4th | (United Kingdom) | ONE87 | Dreadknight | Lex Luthor |
| 5th | (United Kingdom) Jake Neal | RZR | CG Mustard | Bane |
| 5th | (United Kingdom) David Harding | Klesk | Solomon Grundy |
| 7th | (United Kingdom) Ryan Neal | RZR | CG Ketchup | Deathstroke |
| 7th | (United Kingdom) Thomas McConville | PND | Phosferrax | Zatanna |

BlazBlue: Chronophantasma
| Place | Player | Alias | Character(s) |
|---|---|---|---|
| 1st | (United Kingdom) Andrew Grace | Kiba | Valkenhayn |
| 2nd | (United Kingdom) Peter Lynch | Dragonlord Z | Bang |
| 3rd | (United Kingdom) David Babatunde | Kid | Ragna |
| 4th | (United Kingdom) Matthew Crothers | Crothers X | Ragna |
| 5th | (United Kingdom) Adam Heenan | ZT5 | Hazama |
| 5th | (United Kingdom) Jay Jeffs | JayLab | Hazama |
| 7th | (United Kingdom) Matthew Williams | Gamester | Rachel |
| 7th | (United Kingdom) Paul Flynn | Loli Lover | Platinum |

Super Street Fighter II Turbo
| Place | Player | Alias | Character(s) |
|---|---|---|---|
| 1st | (United Kingdom) Joseph Govinden | Orf | Ryu |
| 2nd | (United Kingdom) Fowzi Seed | MBA | Fuzzy | Ryu, Cammy |
| 3rd | (United Kingdom) Jason McCauley | DJ Sylenth | Dhalsim |
| 4th | (United Kingdom) Ryan Hart | DIG | Ryan Hart | Ryu |
| 5th | (United Kingdom) | TsunamiGGPO | Sagat, O. Sagat |
| 5th | (United Kingdom) James Brown | RandomHajile | O. Guile, M.Bison |
| 7th | (Netherlands) Roy Sommeling | LL | MBR | O. Sagat |
| 7th | (United Kingdom) - | ED | Jin | Balrog, Ryu, O.Ken |

=== 2015 (VSFighting 5) ===
VSFighting changed venue again, this time it was held in the centre of Birmingham at The Birmingham Repertory Theatre and newly build Birmingham Library on August 8–09.

Ultra Street Fighter IV
| Place | Player | Alias | Character(s) |
|---|---|---|---|
| 1st | (France) Olivier Hay | MD | Luffy | Rose |
| 2nd | (United Kingdom) Benjamin Simon | KIG | Problem X | C.Viper, Seth |
| 3rd | (United Kingdom) DC Coleman | RIZE | Infexious | Hugo |
| 4th | (United Kingdom) Jonathan Parkes | UM | Tyrant | M.Bison |
| 5th | (United Kingdom) Marcus Parker | Packz | Cody |
| 5th | (United Kingdom) Femi Ade | F-Word | Ibuki |
| 7th | (France) Anani Mustapha | SML | SolidJin | Vega |
| 7th | (United Kingdom) Claude-Eric Diboti | BTM | Hurricane237 | Decapre |

Mortal Kombat X
| Place | Player | Alias | Character(s) |
|---|---|---|---|
| 1st | (Germany) Martin Aim | PND | Madzin | Sub-Zero - Grandmaster, Kotal Kahn - War God |
| 2nd | (United Kingdom) Denom Jones | PND | A Foxy Grampa | Kung Lao - Tempest, Kung Lao - Hat Trick |
| 3rd | (United Kingdom) Ryan Neal | PND | Ketchup | Quan Chi - Sorcerer |
| 4th | (United Kingdom) Jake Neal | PND | Mustard | Shinnok - Bone Shaper, Shinnok - Impostor |
| 5th | (United Kingdom) Adam Cartwright | ED | UndeadJim | Shinnok - Bone Shaper, Jax - Heavy Weapons, Predator - Hunter |
| 5th | (United Kingdom) Jet Ly | ED | Aixy | Cassie Cage - Hollywood, D'Vorah - Venomous, Cassie Cage - Spec Ops |
| 7th | (United Kingdom) Daniel Mok | MBA | Ermok | Ermac - Master of Souls, Kung Lao - Tempest |
| 7th | (United Kingdom) Will Mok | MBA | Zeon | Scorpion - Inferno |

Super Smash Bros. for Wii U
| Place | Player | Alias | Character(s) |
|---|---|---|---|
| 1st | (United Kingdom) James Miller | LOM | J. Miller | Luigi |
| 2nd | (United Kingdom) Benjamin Prah | DX-17 | Rosalina & Luma |
| 3rd | (United Kingdom) Joseph Wilks | ED | Willksy15 | Rosalina & Luma |
| 4th | (United Kingdom) Will Savage | Willz | Captain Falcon |
| 5th | (United Kingdom) Jonty Armstrong | Skarfelt | Fox |
| 5th | (United Kingdom) Jake Ralls | SSW | Devereux | Diddy Kong, Sheik |
| 7th | (United Kingdom) Martin Hines | YTS | Aera | Greninja |
| 7th | (United Kingdom) Steven Avril | Stefwan | Luigi, Yoshi |

Tekken Tag Tournament 2
| Place | Player | Alias | Character(s) |
|---|---|---|---|
| 1st | (United Kingdom) Gabriel Lawal | BTM | Real Menace | Devil Jin, Bob | Eddy, Lars |
| 2nd | (United Kingdom) Justin Nelson | SSTV | King Jae | Bob, Ganryu | Bob, Bruce | Armor King, Marduk |
| 3rd | (United Kingdom) Haroun Butt | Haroun | Hwoarang, Anna |
| 4th | (United Kingdom) Lee Smith-Walters | ShadowForce | Miguel, Lee | Lars, Lee |
| 5th | (United Kingdom) Charles Adewumi | FumeRayz | Kazuya, Bryan | Devil Jin, Bruce |
| 5th | (United Kingdom) Oliver Kucyj | NeedsMoarCoffee | Marduk, Kuma |
| 7th | (United Kingdom) Shomari Carty | ED | Shimma | Marshall Law, Forest Law |
| 7th | (United Kingdom) Suliman Wahid | MBA | Solidus | Lee, Forest Law |

Guilty Gear Xrd -SIGN-
| Place | Player | Alias | Character(s) |
|---|---|---|---|
| 1st | (United Kingdom) Kyle Dixon | Kyzertron | Bedman |
| 2nd | (United Kingdom) Mace Ashby | MOP | C4IQ | Leo Whitefang |
| 3rd | (United Kingdom) Chase Jackson | BFL | God Press | Venom |
| 4th | (United Kingdom) Sean English | Sean E | Venom |
| 5th | (United Kingdom) Edwin Chuah | Mr. E | Sol |
| 5th | (United Kingdom) Matt Huang? | CeX | Goukifafa | Slayer |
| 7th | (United Kingdom) - | Biggles | Leo Whitefang |
| 7th | (United Kingdom) Joe Chessum | SCC | Lark0 | Faust |

=== 2016 (VSFighting 2016) ===
VSFighting 2016 was held at a new ‘Studio’ venue, again located in central Birmingham on August 6–7. This time around, the event included Tekken 7 (courtesy of Bandai Namco Entertainment) as well as a hands on with the superb Blazblue: Central Fiction.

Street Fighter V
| Place | Player | Alias | Character(s) |
|---|---|---|---|
| 1st | (Belgium) Younes Lazaar | AWS | CCL | Chun-Li |
| 2nd | (United States) Chris Tatarian | EVB | Chris Tatarian | Ken |
| 3rd | (France) Christ Onema | AWS | Akainu | Nash |
| 4th | (United Kingdom) Ryan Hart | FA | Ryan Hart | Ken |
| 5th | (United Kingdom) Afsar Ali | PRLS | Afii | Laura |
| 5th | (United States) Brentt Franks | Brenttiscool | Ken |
| 7th | (United Kingdom) Marcus Parker | PRLS | Packz | Karin |
| 7th | (United Kingdom) Sean Dench | UM | ImStillDaDaddy | Guile |

Super Smash Bros. Wii U
| Place | Player | Alias | Character(s) |
|---|---|---|---|
| 1st | (United Kingdom) - | IxisNaugus | Sonic |
| 2nd | (United Kingdom) James Miller | LOM | J. Miller | Luigi |
| 3rd | (United Kingdom) Asim Khan | DAT | Khanage | Peach |
| 4th | (United Kingdom) Jacky Ho | DAT | HO | Sheik |
| 5th | (United Kingdom) Alan Gardner | AfroSmash | Samus |
| 5th | (United Kingdom) Adam Scholes | SSM | Magi | Bowser Jr. |
| 7th | (United Kingdom) Tom Scott | DAT | G~P | Ike |
| 7th | (United Kingdom) Micheal St Louis | Hoe4u | Pikachu |

Killer Instinct
| Place | Player | Alias | Character(s) |
|---|---|---|---|
| 1st | (United Kingdom) Jordan Cooper | TG | CoopStar | Jago, Shadow Jago, Gargos |
| 2nd | (United Kingdom) Robert Doherty | Valoraxe | Cinder, Thunder, Tusk |
| 3rd | (United Kingdom) Mitchell Mead-Lloyd | ShadowCageNinja | Cinder |
| 4th | (United Kingdom) Kester Chidebe | CVE | SM4SHK1NG | Fulgore, Shadow Jago |
| 5th | (United Kingdom) Sean Dench | UM | ImStillDaDaddy | Sabrewulf |
| 5th | (United Kingdom) Dave Welsby | MBA | Banemobius | Spinal, Eyedol |
| 7th | (United Kingdom) Dean Beard | RH | DeaconHyral | Hisako |
| 7th | (United Kingdom) Ryan Neal | PND | Ketchup | Riptor |

Mortal Kombat XL
| Place | Player | Alias | Character(s) |
|---|---|---|---|
| 1st | (United Kingdom) Denom Jones | PxP | A Foxy Grampa | Mileena - Piercing |
| 2nd | (Finland) Justus Hyytiäinen | Jupe | Kano - Cutthroat |
| 3rd | (United Kingdom) Ryan Neal | PND | Ketchup | Tri-Borg - Sektor |
| 4th | (United Kingdom) Regan Higgs | ED | xZoro | Kotal Kahn - War God, Bo' Rai Cho - Dragon Breath |
| 5th | (United Kingdom) Jake Neal | PND | Mustard | Tri-Borg - Cyrax |
| 5th | (United Kingdom) Edward Hemsley | cR | Xarakamaka | Liu Kang - Dragon's Fire, Johnny Cage - A-List |
| 7th | (United Kingdom) | ED | SonicNinja | Cyber Sub-Zero |
| 7th | (Republic of Ireland) Luke Kearns | IrishMantis | Johnny Cage - Stunt Double/A-List |

Guilty Gear Xrd Revelator
| Place | Player | Alias | Character(s) |
|---|---|---|---|
| 1st | (France) Jonathan Santoire | Jackal | Millia |
| 2nd | (United Kingdom) Mace Ashby | SD | C4IQ | Leo Whitefang |
| 3rd | (United Kingdom) Radu Dumitriu | RAD | Ino |
| 4th | (United Kingdom) Kyle Dixon | Kyzertron | Bedman |
| 5th | (United Kingdom) Tim Benning | Benners | Bedman |
| 5th | (United Kingdom) Joe Dillon | MBA | Shadon | Ky |
| 7th | (United Kingdom) Femi Kusimo | ApolloSteed | Venom |
| 7th | (United Kingdom) Alexander Blake | ED | Jinty | Chipp |

Tekken Tag Tournament 2
| Place | Player | Alias | Character(s) |
|---|---|---|---|
| 1st | (United Kingdom) Gabriel Lawal | Real Menace | Devil Jin, Bob |
| 2nd | (United Kingdom) Mario Alonso Tufinio | MBA | RooKang | Bob, Roger Jr. |
| 3rd | (United Kingdom) Justin Nelson | SSTV | KingJae | Ganryu, Bob |
| 4th | (United Kingdom) Haroun Butt | Pad Haroun | Hwoarang, Anna |
| 5th | (United Kingdom) Daniel Dodd | MBA | LordDarkDan | Kazuya, Jin |
| 5th | (United Kingdom) Kai Carty | ED | Xai | Marshall Law, Forest Law |
| 7th | (United Kingdom) Tyrone David | Arsenalty | Jin, Lars |
| 7th | (United Kingdom) Ahdam Sarfraz | Amouage King | Feng, Armour King |

=== 2017 (VSFighting 2017) ===
VSFighting 2017 took place on 12–13 August with the entire event being held at the Millennium Point, Birmingham. The tournament featured 7 games, Injustice 2, Street Fighter V, Tekken 7, BlazBlue Guilty Gear Xrd REV 2, Killer Instinct and Super Smash Bros. for Wii U

Street Fighter V
| Place | Player | Alias | Character(s) |
|---|---|---|---|
| 1st | (Singapore) Kun Xian Ho | RZR | Xian | Ibuki |
| 2nd | (France) Olivier Hay | RB | Luffy | R. Mika |
| 3rd | (United Kingdom) Claude Eric Diboti | exceL | Hurricane | Cammy |
| 4th | (United Kingdom) Benjamin Simon | Mouz | Problem X | M. Bison |
| 5th | (United Kingdom) DC Coleman | exceL | Infexious | Zangief, Abigail, Necalli |
| 5th | (United Kingdom) Afsar Ali | Infused |Afii | Laura |
| 7th | (France) Christ Onema | Prophecy | Akainu | Guile |
| 7th | (United Kingdom) Marcus Parker | Method | Packz | Karin |

Tekken 7
| Place | Player | Alias | Character(s) |
|---|---|---|---|
| 1st | (South Korea) HyunJin Kim | EchoFox | JDCR | Dragunov, Heihachi |
| 2nd | (South Korea) Choi Jinwoo | EchoFox | SAINT | JACK-7 |
| 3rd | (Spain) J Maria Mateo Moreno | Arkham | Caiper | Feng, Kazumi, Dragunov |
| 4th | (United Kingdom) Kane Heartfield | DG | KaneandTrench | Yoshimitsu |
| 5th | (United Kingdom) Eze Izundu | StarScream | Hwoarang |
| 5th | (United Kingdom) Simon Lau | TheTruth | Feng |
| 7th | (Italy) Nicolò Gardino | Enheas | Eddy |
| 7th | (United Kingdom) Danilo Petrillo | DG | ThePhantom | Master Raven |

Injustice 2
| Place | Player | Alias | Character(s) |
|---|---|---|---|
| 1st | (Canada) Matthew Commandeur | Biohazard | Harley Quinn, Bane |
| 2nd | (United Arab Emirates) Sayed Hashem | NASR | TekkenMaster | Brainiac, Atrocitus, Green Arrow |
| 3rd | (United Kingdom) Denom Jones | PxP | A Foxy Grampa | Deadshot |
| 4th | (United States) Nicolas Andersen | RNG | WhiteBoi | Scarecrow, Aquaman |
| 5th | (United Kingdom) Jet Ly | ED | Aixy | Supergirl |
| 5th | (Greece) Marios Dimitrios Bitsikokos | Aris | Nivek | Supergirl |
| 7th | (Germany) Martin Aim | PND | Madzin | Batman |
| 7th | (United Kingdom) Adam Cartwright | ED | UndeadJim | Batman |

Guilty Gear Xrd REV 2
| Place | Player | Alias | Character(s) |
|---|---|---|---|
| 1st | (United Kingdom) Maceo Ashby | SD | C4IQ | Leo |
| 2nd | (Germany) Andreas Biersack | GF | AnBi | Sol |
| 3rd | (Romania) Radu Dumitriu | Rad | I-No |
| 4th | (United Kingdom) Andrew Hinds | SD | CT | Slayer |
| 5th | (United Kingdom) Will Burnett | Willei | Leo |
| 5th | (United Kingdom) Alexander Blake | ED | Jinty | Chipp |
| 7th | (United Kingdom) Paul Dreczkowski | BB | StrawHatter | Chipp |
| 7th | (United Kingdom) Max Prettyjohns | COG | Quora | May |

Super Street Fighter II X
| Place | Player | Alias | Character(s) |
|---|---|---|---|
| 1st | (United Kingdom) Joseph Govinden | Orf | Ryu |
| 2nd | (United Kingdom) Jack Brown | GMC | GolcarJack | Guile |
| 3rd | (France) Igor HAJJAR | Twif | Vega (Claw) |
| 4th | (United Kingdom) Michael Kissane | GMC | Festilence | Ryu, Ken |
| 5th | (United Kingdom) Ben Parrott | MBA | BP Tank | Chun-Li |
| 5th | (United Kingdom) Ryan Hart | Prodigal Son | Ryu |
| 7th | (United Kingdom) Michael Power | Zero1 | Balrog (Boxer) |
| 7th | (United Kingdom) Mohammed Alfasi | ED | Rudi | Ryu |

Killer Instinct
| Place | Player | Alias | Character(s) |
|---|---|---|---|
| 1st | (United Kingdom) Robert Doherty | Valoraxe | Cinder |
| 2nd | (France) Ark Zed | TDB | JBanjo19 | Aria, Kim Wu |
| 3rd | (United Kingdom) Dave Welsby | MBA | Banemobius | Eyedol |
| 4th | (United Kingdom) Marc Phillips | TDB | Drago | TJ Combo |
| 5th | (United Kingdom) Jordan Cooper | TG | CoopStar | Shadow Jago, Jago |
| 5th | (Netherlands) Chi-Man Cheung | AZN | MaDaFakka | Hisako, Orchid |
| 7th | (United Kingdom) Thomas Jenkins | MBA | Legend | Arbiter |
| 7th | (United Kingdom) Mitchell Mead-Lloyd | TDB | H0TSH0T | Cinder |

Super Smash Bros for Wii U
| Place | Player | Alias | Character(s) |
|---|---|---|---|
| 1st | (United Kingdom) Marc Wilson | RST | Fez | Toon Link |
| 2nd | (United Kingdom) Aaron Garlick | Yoite | Ryu |
| 3rd | (United Kingdom) Jordan Oliver | BORT | SK | xxasomeaxx | Pakutena |
| 4th | (United Kingdom) Joseph Wilks | ED | Willksy15 | Rosalina & Luma |
| 5th | (United Kingdom) Sam Foxall | Trilby | Donkey Kong |
| 5th | (United Kingdom) Keegan Spindler | Interrobang!? | Diddy Kong |
| 7th | (United Kingdom) Toby Smith | 2WD | Jaxter | Bayonetta |
| 7th | (United Kingdom) Angus Coutts | TVT | AngusIsZodiak | Bayonetta |

Blazblue: Central Fiction
| Place | Player | Alias | Character(s) |
|---|---|---|---|
| 1st | (United Kingdom) Daniel Babatunde | Kiba | Valkenhayn |
| 2nd | (United Kingdom) Peter Lynch | DragonLordZ | Bang |
| 3rd | (United Kingdom) Joseph Coll | Seo | Kagura |
| 4th | (United Kingdom) Paul Dreczkowski | BB | StrawHatter | Bang |
| 5th | (United Kingdom) Edwin Chuah | NGI | Mr E | Hibiki |
| 5th | (United Kingdom) Andrew Grace | NGI | Zoular | Raquel Alucard |
| 7th | (United Kingdom) Alexander Blake | ED | Jinty | Bang |
| 7th | (United Kingdom) Justin Rutherford | ED | JustinXavier | Litchi, Bullet |

=== 2018 (VSFighting 2018) ===
VSFighting 2017 took place on 20–22 July with the entire event being held at the Millennium Point, Birmingham. The tournament featured 8 games, Street Fighter V: Arcade Edition, Tekken 7, Dragon Ball FighterZ, Guilty Gear Xrd REV 2, BlazBlue: Tag Battle, Injustice 2, Under Night In-Birth Exe: Late[st] and Super Street Fighter II Turbo.

Street Fighter V: Arcade Edition
| Place | Player | Alias | Character(s) |
|---|---|---|---|
| 1st | (Japan) Daigo Umehara | CYG.BST | Daigo "The Beast" | Guile |
| 2nd | (Japan) Atsushi Fujimura | Fudoh | Fujimura | Ibuki |
| 3rd | (Korea) Geon Sim | UYU |NL | Cammy |
| 4th | (United States) Justin Wong | FOX | JWong | Menat |
| 5th | (United Arab Emirates) Adel Anouche | NASR | Big Bird | Rashid, Ken |
| 5th | (United Kingdom) Shakil Ghazi | FNATIC | Shakz | Laura |
| 7th | (Japan) Takeuchi Ryota | Liquid | John Takeuchi | Rashid |
| 7th | (Japan) Naoto Sako | FAV | sako | Menat |

Tekken 7
| Place | Player | Alias | Character(s) |
|---|---|---|---|
| 1st | (Korea) Choi Jinwoo | FOX | SAINT | Jack-7 |
| 2nd | (Korea) Mu Jung Kim | kkokkoma | Kazumi, Paul, Geese, Dragunov, Devil Jin |
| 3rd | (Korea) Sanghyeon Jeon | UYU | JeonDDing | Eddy, Lucky Chloe |
| 4th | (Korea) HyunJin Kim | FOX | JDCR | Dragunov, Heihachi |
| 5th | (Italy) Luca Cianfa | 4G | Devilkazuya | Devil Jin |
| 5th | (Germany) Arja Gamoori | DO | Sephiblack | Miguel |
| 7th | (United Kingdom) Asim Ali | District G | Asim | Katarina, Kazumi |
| 7th | (Italy) Shimon Kawai | CGG | Tissuemon | Master Raven |

Dragon Ball FighterZ
| Place | Player | Alias | Character(s) |
|---|---|---|---|
| 1st | (United States) Dominique McLean | FOX | [[SonicFox]] | Bardock/Zamasu Fused/Android 16 |
| 2nd | (Japan) Ryo Nozaki | CAG | Dogura | Kid Buu/Cell/Goku Super Saiyan |
| 3rd | (Japan) Goichi Kishida | CAG | GO1 | Cell/Bardock/Vegeta Super Saiyan |
| 4th | (United States) Jon Coello | FOX | dekillsage | Gohan Adult/Gotenks/Android 16 |
| 5th | (Germany) Dean Bajram | DO | Zer0q | Cell/Vegeta SSGSS/Gotenks |
| 5th | (Japan) Naoki Nakayama | PONOS | moke | Kid Buu/Cell/Trunks |
| 7th | (Japan) Okamoto Keiji | PONOS | garireo | Bardock/Goku Black/Android 16 |
| 7th | (Japan) Yuji Sasaki | GGWP | Souji | Kid Buu/Cell/Goku Super Saiyan |

BlazBlue: Cross Tag Battle
| Place | Player | Alias | Character(s) |
|---|---|---|---|
| 1st | (Japan) Yuji Sasaki | GGWP | Souji | Ruby/Es |
| 2nd | (United Kingdom) Kevin Hoang | NGI | DBlanks | Platinum/Es |
| 3rd | (Sweden) John E | hiari | Vatista/Yang |
| 4th | (United Kingdom) Kieran Collins | RIZE | KNX | Blake/Yang |
| 5th | (France) Enzo Cocco | Shenzo | Vatista/V13, Es/Jin |
| 5th | (France) Arnaud Le Gall | gwak.fr ZOWIE | Achorawl | Kanji/Azrael |
| 7th | (Finland) Jani Häyhänen | TA | wauhti | Orie/Nu-13 |
| 7th | (United Kingdom) Joshua Podesta | SWW | Rycroft | Ruby/Es |

Super Street Fighter II X
| Place | Player | Alias | Character(s) |
|---|---|---|---|
| 1st | (United States) Justin Wong | FOX | JWong | O-Sagat |
| 2nd | (United Kingdom) Joseph Govinden | Orf | Ryu |
| 3rd | (United Kingdom) Jack Brown | GMC | GolcarJack | Guile |
| 4th | (United Kingdom) Jordan Hartshorne | Jin | Ken |
| 5th | (France) Igor HAJJAR | Twif | Vega (Claw), O-Sagat |
| 5th | (United Kingdom) Ryan Hart | Prodigal Son | Ryu |
| 7th | (United Kingdom) Farhan Ahmed | dWo | FARMAN | O-Sagat, Ryu |
| 7th | (United Kingdom) - | TheBox | Guile |

Under Night In-Birth Exe: Late[st]
| Place | Player | Alias | Character(s) |
|---|---|---|---|
| 1st | (Sweden) John E | hiari | Linne |
| 2nd | (Germany) Marco Matioschek | CrushingEagle | Wagner |
| 3rd | (Finland) Jani Häyhänen | TA | wauhti | Hilda |
| 4th | (United Kingdom) Bambo Komolafe | Dazardz | Seth |
| 5th | (United Kingdom) Cameron Philbert | NJT | VentusCross | Waldstein |
| 5th | (United Kingdom) Jamie Barraclough | SDO | Tokazz | Hilda |
| 7th | (United Kingdom) Alex Stopher | NGI | AngelDarksong | Carmine |
| 7th | (France) Enzo Cocco | Shenzo | Phonon, Hilda |

Guilty Gear Xrd REV2
| Place | Player | Alias | Character(s) |
|---|---|---|---|
| 1st | (France) Enzo Cocco | Shenzo | Dizzy |
| 2nd | (Romania) Radu Dumitriu | Hound | RAD | I-No |
| 3rd | (Australia) Tony Pazanin | Crack Addict Lolis | Jack-O’ |
| 4th | (United Kingdom) Joseph Chessum | SCC | Lark0 | Faust |
| 5th | (United Kingdom) Peter Trimble | petezilla | Elphelt |
| 5th | (France) Arnaud Le Gall | gwak.fr ZOWIE | Achorawl | Leo Whitefang |
| 7th | (Japan) Tanaka Yohei | WP | Daikoku_GO | Leo Whitefang |
| 7th | (United Kingdom) Maceo Ashby | SD | C4IQ | Leo Whitefang |

Injustice 2
| Place | Player | Alias | Character(s) |
|---|---|---|---|
| 1st | (United Kingdom) Tyrese Carl | DizzyTT | Catwoman |
| 2nd | (United Kingdom) Regan Higgs | xZoro | Supergirl |
| 3rd | (United Kingdom) Adam Cartwright | ED | Undeadjim | Cyborg |
| 4th | (Scotland) Andrew Paterson | AWP | Firestorm, Blue Beetle |
| 5th | (United Kingdom) Jett Roos | Skyylark | Robin |
| 5th | (Scotland) Paul Young | GK | Youphemism | Supergirl |
| 7th | (United Kingdom) George Jenkinson | Jenko | Leonardo - TMNT |
| 7th | (United Kingdom) Oscar Pollard | Slaughterz | Green Arrow |

=== 2019 (VSFighting 2019) ===
VSFighting 2019 took place on 20–21 July with the entire event being held at the Millennium Point, Birmingham. The tournament featured 8 games, Street Fighter V: Arcade Edition, Tekken 7, Mortal Kombat 11, Dragon Ball FighterZ, Samurai Showdown, SoulCalibur VI, Dead or Alive 6 and Super Street Fighter II Turbo.

Street Fighter V: Arcade Edition
| Place | Player | Alias | Character(s) |
|---|---|---|---|
| 1st | (Japan) Masato Takahashi | RB|Bonchan | Karin, Sagat |
| 2nd | (United States) Victor Woodley | REC | Punk | Karin |
| 3rd | (Japan) Masahiro Tominaga | YOG | Machabo | Necalli |
| 4th | (United Arab Emirates) Amjad Alshalabi | NASR | AngryBird | Zeku, Ibuki |
| 5th | (United Kingdom) DC Coleman | CYG | Infexious | Zeku |
| 5th | (Norway) Arman Hanjani | NVD | Phenom | Karin, Necalli, M.Bison |
| 7th | (Japan) Kanamori Tsunehiro | RB | Gachikun | Rashid |
| 7th | (Japan) Naoto Sako | FAV | sako | Menat |

Tekken 7
| Place | Player | Alias | Character(s) |
|---|---|---|---|
| 1st | (Korea) Jae Min Bae | ROX | Knee | Steve, Kazumi, Jin, Lars |
| 2nd | (Korea) Sun-Woong Youn | UYU | LowHigh | Law, Shaheen, Steve, Kazumi |
| 3rd | (France) Vincent Homan | CRaZY | SuperAkouma | Akuma |
| 4th | (Japan) Genki Kumisaka | Liquid | Gen | Shaheen, Law, Leo |
| 5th | (United Kingdom) Philip Mackenzie | Dinosaur | Bryan |
| 5th | (Japan) Yota Kachi | MVP | Pekos | Geese, Katarina |
| 7th | (South Korea) Mu-Jung Kim | Talon | Kkokkoma | Dragunov, Kazumi, Geese, Paul |
| 7th | (Republic of Ireland) Fergus Mc Gee | AXL | Fergus | Asuka, Katarina |

Dragon Ball FighterZ
| Place | Player | Alias | Character(s) |
|---|---|---|---|
| 1st | (Japan) Goichi Kishida | CAG | GO1 | Bardock, Kid Goku, Goku |
| 2nd | (Japan) - | CAG | Fenrich | Cell, Bardock, Vegeta |
| 3rd | (France) Marwan Berthe | GENKI | Wawa | Kid Goku, Base Goku, Goku |
| 4th | (United States) Eduardo Hook | NRG | HookGangGod | Piccolo, Bardock, Vegeta | Piccolo, Bardock, Kid Goku |
| 5th | (Spain) Joan N. | VGIA | Shanks | Android 18, Adult Gohan, Goku |
| 5th | (France) Mohamed Sobti | WrNx | Kayne | Teen Gohan, Goku Black, Kid Goku |
| 7th | (Japan) 今井 翼 | Maddo | Kid Buu, Yamcha, Adult Gohan |
| 7th | (Japan) Ryota Inoue | BC | Kazunoko | Kid Buu, Adult Gohan, Yamcha |

Mortal Kombat 11
| Place | Player | Alias | Character(s) |
|---|---|---|---|
| 1st | (United Kingdom) Denom Jones | PXP | A Foxy Grampa | Kung Lao, Jacqui, Cassie Cage, Sub-Zero |
| 2nd | (United Kingdom) Reece Gill | PND | OmegaK | Geras |
| 3rd | (United Kingdom) Tyrese Carl | DizzyTT | Sonya, Liu Kang, Cassie Cage |
| 4th | (Greece) Marios Dimitrios Bitsikokos | LOK | Nivek | Kabal, Jacqui |
| 5th | (United Kingdom) Amun Davis | ED | SeaCyat | Sub-Zero |
| 5th | (United Kingdom) Tyrese Oswald | SonicNinja | Kabal |
| 7th | (United Kingdom) Jordan James | VideoGamezYo | Shao Kahn, Jax |
| 7th | (United Kingdom) Adam Cartwright | ED | UndeadJim | Jax |

Samurai Showdown
| Place | Player | Alias | Character(s) |
|---|---|---|---|
| 1st | (Japan) Ryota Inoue | BC | Kazunoko | Haohmaru, Genjuro |
| 2nd | (Japan) Yota Kachi | MVP | Pekos | Haohmaru |
| 3rd | (Taiwan) Li-Wei Lin | UYU | OilKing | Haohmaru |
| 4th | (United Kingdom) Daniel Mullen | Lord Tenners | Genjuro, Tam Tam |
| 5th | (United Kingdom) Joshua Podesta | SWW | Rycroft | Charlotte |
| 5th | (United Kingdom) Neil Mc Allister | Neilo | Yoshitora |
| 7th | (United Kingdom) Osmar Brandao | MFGC | Baaltzelmoth | Genjuro |
| 7th | (United Kingdom) Jake Neal | PND | Mustard | Galford |

Dead or Alive 6
| Place | Player | Alias | Character(s) |
|---|---|---|---|
| 1st | (Netherlands) Jim Timmerman | CRaZY | Gehaktball | Bass, Zack |
| 2nd | (Japan) - | COMP | Siologica | NiCO |
| 3rd | (France) Satheen Soomer | Ky-Dragon | Mai, Kasumi, NiCO |
| 4th | (Japan) Iwami Teru | COMP | TeruRock | Kasumi |
| 5th | (United Kingdom) Ivan C. | ULTIMa | Ivanov | Christie |
| 5th | (France) Tristan Mazars | Snow | Phase 4, Kula |
| 7th | (United States) - | UGS | BBoyDragon | NiCO, Kula |
| 7th | (France) Laura Magne | ElenaBathory | Helena |

SoulCalibur VI
| Place | Player | Alias | Character(s) |
|---|---|---|---|
| 1st | (France) - | GO | Keev | Nightmare |
| 2nd | (France) Jérémy Bernard | Oplon | Skyll | Mitsurugi |
| 3rd | (France) Benoît T. | YUZU | Ganondeurf | Azwel |
| 4th | (United Kingdom) Andrew Smith | AndyrooSC | Zasalamel |
| 5th | (France) Jason Levazeux | Abysses | Jason | Seong Mi-Na |
| 5th | (United Kingdom) Omar R. | HolyCarp | Ivy |
| 7th | (Greece) - | LOK | VaanGR | Ivy |
| 7th | (France) Nicolas Jeanjaquet | Aelz | Tira |

Super Street Fighter II X
| Place | Player | Alias | Character(s) |
|---|---|---|---|
| 1st | (United Kingdom) Jack Brown | GMC | GolcarJack | Guile |
| 2nd | (United Kingdom) Fowzi Seed | Fuzzy | Ryu, Cammy |
| 3rd | (United Kingdom) Jordan Hartshorne | Jin | Ken, Guile |
| 4th | (France) Igor HAJJAR | Twif | Vega (Claw) |
| 5th | (France) - | WF.ELC | DonYann | Ken |
| 5th | (United Kingdom) - | Ashman NW | Chun-Li |
| 7th | (United Kingdom) - | Raging Noob | Zangief |
| 7th | (United Kingdom) Robbie Graham | Baha | Chun-Li |

=== 2022 (VSFighting X) ===
VSFighting 2022 took place on 19–21 August with the entire event being held at the Millennium Point, Birmingham. The tournament featured 6 games, Street Fighter V: CE, Tekken 7, Guilty Gear Strive, King of Fighters XV, Dragon Ball FighterZ, and DNF Duel. An additional 6 games were run by the community Super Street Fighter II Turbo, Ultra Street Fighter IV, Ultimate Marvel vs Capcom 3, SoulCalibur VI, and Virtua Fighter 5. Capcom UK also brought along the current demo of Street Fighter 6.

Street Fighter V: Champion Edition
| Place | Player | Alias | Character(s) |
|---|---|---|---|
| 1st | (United States) Victor Woodley | PG | Punk | Ken, Kolin, Cammy, Necalli, Luke |
| 2nd | (United Kingdom) Jermaine Landell | JeSTeRPoWeR | Vega |
| 3rd | (United Kingdom) - | EndingWalker | Ed |
| 4th | (Kuwait) Ahmad Aldoukhi | Dudebag | Akuma, Ken |
| 5th | (United Kingdom) Shaquille Jones | Joness | Ken |
| 5th | (United Kingdom) Amaar Razaq | Genuiskid | Kage |
| 7th | (United Kingdom) Amar Sangha | Reason|Boltstrike | Vega |
| 7th | (United Kingdom) Reneil Landell | JoKeR JoKeZ | Akira, Ken, Dhalsim, Guile |

Tekken 7
| Place | Player | Alias | Character(s) |
|---|---|---|---|
| 1st | (Pakistan) Arslan Ash | Fate / RB | Arslan Ash | Zafina, Kazumi, Nina |
| 2nd | (Pakistan) Hasan R. | GG | JoKa | Feng, Heihachi |
| 3rd | (France) Vincent Homan | CRaZY | SuperAkouma | Akuma |
| 4th | (Spain) Jose Maria Mate Moreno | GG | Caiper | Feng |
| 5th | (Spain) Jordi Domenech | GG | Banana | Geese |
| 5th | (Italy) Daniel Madonia | HG | Danielmado | Jin, Leroy |
| 7th | (Germany) Cihangir Esiyok | DBP | Bob |
| 7th | (Germany) Arja Gamoori | BIG | Sephiblack | Miguel |

Guilty Gear Strive
| Place | Player | Alias | Character(s) |
|---|---|---|---|
| 1st | (France) Jérémy Bernard | Oplon|Skyll | Sol, Ky |
| 2nd | (Israel) Atir Yosef | BGS|Zando | Ramlethal |
| 3rd | (United Kingdom) Adam Farmer | Setchi | Zato-1 |
| 4th | (United Kingdom) - | TigerPop | Happy Chaos |
| 5th | (Sweden) William Hjelte | TSM | Leffen | Zato-1 |
| 5th | (United Kingdom) Callum W. | VXD | MysticSmash | Axl, Nagoriyuki |
| 7th | (Saudi Arabia) Abdulatif Alhmili | NASR | Latif | Zato-1 |
| 7th | (United States) Victor Woodley | PG | Punk | Sol, Millia |

King of Fighters XV
| Place | Player | Alias | Character(s) |
|---|---|---|---|
| 1st | (Pakistan) Arslan Ash | Fate | Arslan Ash | B. Jenet, Chizuru, Elisabeth | Others |
| 2nd | (Sweden) Sebastian Kappelin | BubblanAB7 | K', Krohnen, Ash |
| 3rd | (United Kingdom) Gavin Drakes | Supa | Mai, Andy, King | Athena, Mai, King |
| 4th | (United Kingdom) Harry Adams | GAW | InfernoKong | Omega Rugal, King of Dinosaurs, Antonov | Others |
| 5th | (United Kingdom) Cristina Wong | INTI | KuriNyanko | B. Jenet, Leona, Chizuru | Ángel, Chizuru, B. Jenet | Others |
| 5th | (United Kingdom) Michael Strain | B2F | Paladin | Yuri, Kyo, Leona |
| 7th | (United Kingdom) Jarvis Mainwaring | Boroshin | Maxima, Gato, Yamazaki |
| 7th | (United Kingdom) - | Acda200 | B. Jenet, King, Mai |

Dragon Ball FighterZ
| Place | Player | Alias | Character(s) |
|---|---|---|---|
| 1st | (France) Mohamed Sobti | Kayne | SS4 Gogeta, Lab Coat 21, Tien |
| 2nd | (France) Mael Jomie | Solary|Yasha | Lab Coat 21, Janemba, Hit |
| 3rd | (France) Yonis A. | Solary | Yasha | Blue Gogeta, Vegito, Android 17 |
| 4th | (Japan) Goichi Kishida | CAG | GO1 | Blue Gogeta, Vegito, Lab Coat 21 |
| 5th | (Spain) Daniel Gras Llopis | FT | Gropis | Super Baby 2, Fused Zamasu, Beerus |
| 5th | (France) Hasni Rivallin | DZ | Noka | SS4 Gogeta, Lab Coat 21, Ultra Instinct Goku |
| 7th | (Germany) Kai P. | MFN | Hi Kai | Captain Ginyu, Frieza, Tien |
| 7th | (United Kingdom) Jesse O | OBAssassin | Teen Gohan, Hit, Lab Coat 21 | Lab Coat 21, Hit, Goku Black |

DNF Duel
| Place | Player | Alias | Character(s) |
|---|---|---|---|
| 1st | (Japan) Goichi Kishida | CAG | GO1 | Swift Master |
| 2nd | (United Kingdom) Callum W. | VXD | MysticSmash | Hitman |
| 3rd | (Sweden) Albin L. | Paddu | Trouble Shooter |
| 4th | (United Kingdom) - | SWW | Rycroft | Dragon Knight |
| 5th | (Germany) Rene W. | Mik | Dragon Knight |
| 5th | (United Kingdom) Shahidul Islam | Deviance | Swift Master |
| 7th | (United Kingdom) - | Noktron | Trouble Shooter |
| 7th | (Germany) - | Khez | Ghostblade, Berserker |

Super Street Fighter II X
| Place | Player | Alias | Character(s) |
|---|---|---|---|
| 1st | (United Kingdom) Jack Brown | GMC | GolcarJack | Guile |
| 2nd | (France) - | Lil'Fighters | Touakak | Dhalsim |
| 3rd | (France) - | DonYann | Ken |
| 4th | (United Kingdom) - | RagingNoob | Zangief, O. Ryu, O. Sagat |
| 5th | (United Kingdom) - | Relinquished | M. Bison (Dictator) |
| 5th | (United Kingdom) Jordan Hartshorne | Jin | Ken |
| 7th | (United Kingdom) - | Twif | Vega (Claw) |
| 7th | (United Kingdom) Ayub Chaudry | KungFoo | Chun-Li |

Ultra Street Fighter IV
| Place | Player | Alias | Character(s) |
|---|---|---|---|
| 1st | (United Kingdom) Zain J. | Zain | Yang, Guile |
| 2nd | (United Kingdom) Tom Hewett | Chemandinga | Makoto |
| 3rd | (United States) Victor Woodley | PG | Punk | Yun, Seth, Ryu, Evil Ryu, Sagat |
| 4th | (France) - | JinsukeSaze | M.Bison |
| 5th | (United Kingdom) - | Jingojungle | Sakura |
| 5th | (United Kingdom) - | Ajay | Sagat |
| 7th | (United Kingdom) Jake Branch | Reason | Incognitus | T. Hawk |
| 7th | (Australia) | Exis | Blanka |

Ultimate Marvel vs. Capcom 3
| Place | Player | Alias | Character(s) |
|---|---|---|---|
| 1st | (United Kingdom) - | Spartan Throne | Wolverine, Dormammu, Iron Fist |
| 2nd | (United Kingdom) Ryan Moore | ShuffleUK | Hulk, Sentinel, Haggar |
| 3rd | (United Kingdom) Joseph Smith | CPT_JOE | AshleySchaferBMW | Hulk, Sentinel, Haggar | Haggar, Storm, Morrigan |
| 4th | (United Kingdom) - | Glass | Chris, Dante, Strider | Chris, Sentinel, Dante |
| 5th | (United Kingdom) - | CatboyFriender | Morrigan, Vergil, Dr. Doom |
| 5th | (United Kingdom) - | Demonphoenix237 | Nova, Vergil, Hawkeye |
| 7th | (United Kingdom) Thomas Howarth | Doplghost | Thor, Arthur, Firebrand |
| 7th | (United Kingdom) - | NGI|TalesOfMrE | Magneto, Spencer, Haggar |

Soul Calibur VI
| Place | Player | Alias | Character(s) |
|---|---|---|---|
| 1st | (United Kingdom) Scott Murphy | SsyluS-SC | Raphael |
| 2nd | (France) Jason Levazeux | Pulsar | Jason | Seong Mi-na, Taki |
| 3rd | (France) Nicolas Jeanjaquet | Aelz | Tira |
| 4th | (United Kingdom) - | Loz Kias | Talim |
| 5th | (France) Benoît T. | YUZU | Ganondeurf | Azwel |
| 5th | (United Kingdom) - | SomethingRefined | Grøh |
| 7th | (United Kingdom) Jordan Addams | Koenji | Seong Mi-na |
| 7th | (United Kingdom) - Omar R | HolyCarp | Ivy |

Virtua Fighter 5: Ultimate Showdown
| Place | Player | Alias | Character(s) |
|---|---|---|---|
| 1st | (United Kingdom) Kieran Ribeiro | Rize | NeonKay64 | Eileen |
| 2nd | (United Kingdom) Arthur Brown | SMBF | Crystal City Jayne$$ | Brad |
| 3rd | (United Kingdom) Olugbenga Bammodu | RISE RS | Arsenegbenga | Brad |
| 4th | (United Kingdom) Joseph Chessum | SCC | Lark0 | Shun |
| 5th | (United Kingdom) Jonathan Edwards | dWo | Jonster | Taka-Arashi |
| 5th | (United Kingdom) - | TKC | Kingshamus1 | Taka-Arashi |
| 7th | (United Kingdom) Aaron Asante | AZYG4LYFE | Pai Chan |
| 7th | (United Kingdom) - | Rize RS | Ice Bluu | Wolf |

=== 2023 (VSFighting XI) ===
VSFighting 2023 took place on 18–20 August with the entire event being held at the Millennium Point, Birmingham. The tournament featured 5 main games, Street Fighter 6, Tekken 7, Guilty Gear Strive, King of Fighters XV and Dragon Ball FighterZ. An additional three were side games, Super Street Fighter II Turbo, Street Fighter III: 3rd Strike and SoulCalibur VI. In addition to the side games, there were also 6 games ran by the community, BlazBlue: Central Fiction, Granblue Fantasy Versus, Marvel vs Capcom: Infinite, Tekken 3 Ball, Melty Blood: Type Lumina, Ultimate Marvel vs Capcom 3.

Main Games:

Street Fighter 6
| Place | Player | Alias | Character(s) |
|---|---|---|---|
| 1st | (Sweden) Andreas Persson | KS | Rikemansbarnet | Juri |
| 2nd | (United Kingdom) Claude Eric D | Hurricane | Cammy |
| 3rd | (United Kingdom) - | Juicyjoe | JP |
| 4th | (United Kingdom) - | M80 | EndingWalker | Ken / Ryu |
| 5th | (United Kingdom) Callum Souter | SoundBoi | Luke |
| 5th | (France) Mohamed Sobti | Kayne | Ken |
| 7th | (United Kingdom) Shakil Ghazi | Shakz | Luke / Marisa |
| 7th | (United Kingdom) Lucas P. | MFGC | LinkNova | JP |

Tekken 7
| Place | Player | Alias | Character(s) |
|---|---|---|---|
| 1st | (Korea) Sanghyeon Jeon | DH.CHJ | JeonDding | Julia / Eddy |
| 2nd | (France) Vincent Homan | CRaZY Hitbox | SuperAkouma | Akouma |
| 3rd | (Saudi Arabia) Raef Alturkistani | Dragons | Raef | Jin |
| 4th | (Germany) Akhil K. | GL | Tetsu | Claudio |
| 5th | (United Kingdom) Asim ali | Asim | Katarina / Bob |
| 5th | (United Kingdom) Gosain | Hussain Shah | Law |
| 7th | (France) - | Jodd | Nina |
| 7th | (Korea) mu jong kim | Kiba Esports | kkokkoma | Kunimitsu / Feng / Zafina |

Guilty Gear Strive
| Place | Player | Alias | Character(s) |
|---|---|---|---|
| 1st | (United States) Jonathan Tene | Jonathan Tene | Zato-1 |
| 2nd | (United Kingdom) Adam Farmer | Setchi | Zato-1 |
| 3rd | (United Kingdom) - | Tiger_Pop | Happy Chaos |
| 4th | (United Kingdom) - | Dejojo | Baiken |
| 5th | (United States) Claire Harrison | UMISHO | Happy Chaos / Sol |
| 5th | (Italy) Jason Edward Thomas | Jetstream | Happy Chaos / Nagoriyuki |
| 7th | (United Kingdom) - | SWW_Rycroft | Asuka |
| 7th | (United States) - | Razzo | Giovanna |

King of Fighters XV
| Place | Player | Alias | Character(s) |
|---|---|---|---|
| 1st | (United Kingdom) Harry Adams | InfernoKong | Omega Rugal / King of Dinosaurs /Antonov |
| 2nd | (United Kingdom) - | Lord Tenrai | Kyo / Ryo / Krohnen |
| 3rd | (United Kingdom) Cristina Wong | KuriNyanko | Isla / B.Jenet / Chizuru |
| 4th | (Spain) - | Luigi | Kukri / Shun'ei / Isla |
| 5th | (Sweden) Sabastian Kappelin | Bubblan | Ash / Ryo/ K' |
| 5th | (Cameroon) Claude Eric Diboti | Hurricane | Orochi Yashiro / Ryo / Clark |
| 7th | (United Kingdom) - | Supa | Athena / Mai / Andy |
| 7th | (United Kingdom) - | SamuariPizzaKen | Clark / Dolores / Kukri |

Dragon Ball FighterZ
| Place | Player | Alias | Character(s) |
|---|---|---|---|
| 1st | (France) Yonis Ahamada | Yasha | Gogeta (SSGSS) / Vegito (SSGSS) /Android 17 |
| 2nd | (United Kingdom) Jesse O | OBAssassin | Gohan (Teen) / Hit / Trunks / Android 21 (Lab Coat) / Android 16 |
| 3rd | (France) Mohamed Sobti | Kayne | Gogeta(SS4) / Vegeta(SSGSS) / Time |
| 4th | (France) Mael Jomie | Wade | Jiren / Hit / Janemba |
| 5th | (France) - | Kasuga | Kefla / Android 21 (Lab Coat) / Android 18 |
| 5th | (United Kingdom) - | Plug | Goku (SSGSS) / Videl / Nappa |
| 7th | (United Kingdom) - | Willow | Android 18 / Beerus / Krillin |
| 7th | (France) Hasni Rivallin | Noka | Goku Black / Kid Buu / Gohan (Adult) |

Side Games:

SoulCalibur VI
| Place | Player | Alias | Character(s) |
|---|---|---|---|
| 1st | (Italy) - | Mercymainbtw | Hilda/Setsuka |
| 2nd | (United Kingdom) - | SSYULS-SC | Raphael |
| 3rd | (United Kingdom) - | Neon | Talim |
| 4th | (United Kingdom) - | AndyrooSC | Zasalamel |
| 5th | (United Kingdom) - | Aarpia | Zasalamel |
| 5th | (United Kingdom) - | WorldBranstar | Astaroth |
| 7th | (United Kingdom) - | Lozkias | Talim |
| 7th | (United Kingdom) - | SomethingRefined | Grøh |

Super Street Fighter II Turbo
| Place | Player | Alias | Character(s) |
|---|---|---|---|
| 1st | (United Kingdom) - | GolcarJack | Guile |
| 2nd | (France) - | ISIMORN | Vega |
| 3rd | (United Kingdom) - | Vile Island | Cammy |
| 4th | (United Kingdom) - | MiniiShen4 | Chun-Li |
| 5th | (France) - | TwiF | Vega |
| 5th | (United Kingdom) - | Ryan Hart | Ken/Sagat |
| 7th | (United Kingdom) - | Jinty | Ken |
| 7th | (United Kingdom) - | Lark0 | Dhalsim |

Street Fighter III: 3rd Strike
| Place | Player | Alias | Character(s) |
|---|---|---|---|
| 1st | (France) - | NiaBanH | Makoto |
| 2nd | (United Kingdom) - | 3J | Makoto |
| 3rd | (United Kingdom) - | Tamraz | Yang |
| 4th | (United Kingdom) - | Ryan Hart | Ken |
| 5th | (United Kingdom) - | Scotty2salty | Dudley |
| 5th | (United Kingdom) - | Rudi | Ken |
| 7th | (United Kingdom) - | Cactu | Elena |
| 7th | (United Kingdom) - | TG | Ken |

Community Games:

BlazBlue: Central Fiction
| Place | Player | Alias | Character(s) |
|---|---|---|---|
| 1st | (United Kingdom) - | DLZ | Susanoo |
| 2nd | (United Kingdom) - | NGI | EXonestar | Litchi |
| 3rd | (United Kingdom) - | Sir Panda | Relius |
| 4th | (Denmark) - | heyheylo | Mai |
| 5th | (United Kingdom) - | hemi64 | Nine |
| 5th | (United Kingdom) - | NGI | DBlanks | Platinum |
| 7th | (United Kingdom) - | Radian | Azreal |
| 7th | (United Kingdom) - | S-Critical | Makoto |

Granblue Fantasy Versus
| Place | Player | Alias | Character(s) |
|---|---|---|---|
| 1st | (United Kingdom) - | Dudeakoff | Metera / Seox |
| 2nd | (United Kingdom) - | Cakekattekoi | BeelZELBUB |
| 3rd | (France) - | Bribrisan | Anre |
| 4th | (United Kingdom) - | Chariot | Lancelot / Eustace |
| 5th | (United Kingdom) - | LobstersArentImmortal | Ferry |
| 5th | (United Kingdom) - | Openwolf | Avatarbelial |
| 7th | (United Kingdom) - | Nyu | Lancelot |
| 7th | (United Kingdom) - | Releasebogus | Lowaine |

Marvel vs Capcom: Infinite
| Place | Player | Alias | Character(s) |
|---|---|---|---|
| 1st | (United Kingdom) Maceo Ashby | C4IQ | Hawkeye / Venom |
| 2nd | (United Kingdom) - | Jads | Dante / Spencer |
| 3rd | (United Kingdom) - | Jonesy | Strider / Doctor Strange / Dante |
| 4th | (United Kingdom) - | FullMetalFury | Sigma / Gamora |
| 5th | (United Kingdom) - | TheBlackFrench | Captain Marvel / Sigma |
| 5th | (United Kingdom) - | TalesOfMrE | Chun-Li / Dormammu |
| 7th | (Spain) - | UchihaJorg | Stider / Venom |
| 7th | (United Kingdom) - | Lasaga | Nemesis / Winter Soldier |

Tekken 3 - Tekken Ball
| Place | Player | Alias | Character(s) |
|---|---|---|---|
| 1st | (United Kingdom) Richard Leard | PND | Strykie | Yoshimitsu |
| 2nd | (United Kingdom) Sean C Towey | MBA | SeanSymphony | Law |
| 3rd | (United Kingdom) Shehroze J. | Geowesome | Law |
| 4th | (United Kingdom) Sky Williamson | DQ | SlawPro | Anna |
| 5th | (United Kingdom) Justin Stennett | King Jae | Law |
| 5th | (United Kingdom) Ying-Kit Ma | MBA | Yingah | Anna |
| 7th | (United Kingdom) Michael Smith | DQ | ProtonicCobra | Gun-Jack / Heihachi |
| 7th | (United Kingdom) Robert Bradley | Quinny | Bryan |

Melty Blood: Type Lumina
| Place | Player | Alias | Character(s) |
|---|---|---|---|
| 1st | (United Kingdom) - | mossmossmoss | Mash / Akiha |
| 2nd | (United Kingdom) - | hemi64 | Vlov |
| 3rd | (United Kingdom) - | Large Lad | The Count of Monte Cristo |
| 4th | (United Kingdom) - | GideonTG | Vlov |
| 5th | (United Kingdom) - | DixiE | Red Arcuide |
| 5th | (United Kingdom) - | PossibleRat | Saber |
| 7th | (Germany) - | Antser | Mash |
| 7th | (United Kingdom) - | TitanicWomble | Miyako |

Ultimate Marvel vs Capcom 3
| Place | Player | Alias | Character(s) |
|---|---|---|---|
| 1st | (United Kingdom) - | Spartan Throne | Wolverine / Dormammu / Iron Fist |
| 2nd | (United Kingdom) - | Shuffle | Hulk / Sentinel / Haggar |
| 3rd | (United Kingdom) - | TalesOfMrE | Nova / Doctor Doom / Spencer | Firebrand / Doctor Strange / Dormammu |
| 4th | (United Kingdom) - | Demonphoenix237 | Morrigan / Doctor Doom / Virgil / Nova / Shuma-Gorath |
| 5th | (United Kingdom) - | Captain_Joe_ASBMW | Hulk / Sentinel / Haggar |
| 5th | (United Kingdom) - | MysticSmash | Dante / Virgil / Shuma-Gorath |
| 7th | (United Kingdom) - | Jacky Chan | Trish / Nova / Akouma |
| 7th | (United Kingdom) - | Inclaa | Magneto / Doctor Doom / Phoenix |
