= EGX (expo) =

Video game trade fair

- Status: Active
- Genre: Video games
- Venue: Various
- Location: Various
- Country: United Kingdom; Germany
- Inaugurated: 28–29 October 2008
- Most recent: 25–27 October 2024
- Next event: 22–24 May 2026
- Organiser: ReedPop
- Members: ReedPop
- Sponsors: TikTok
- Website: www.egx.net

EGX (previously named Eurogamer Expo) is a trade fair for video games organised by ReedPop (and previously Gamer Network), and held annually in the United Kingdom.

== History ==
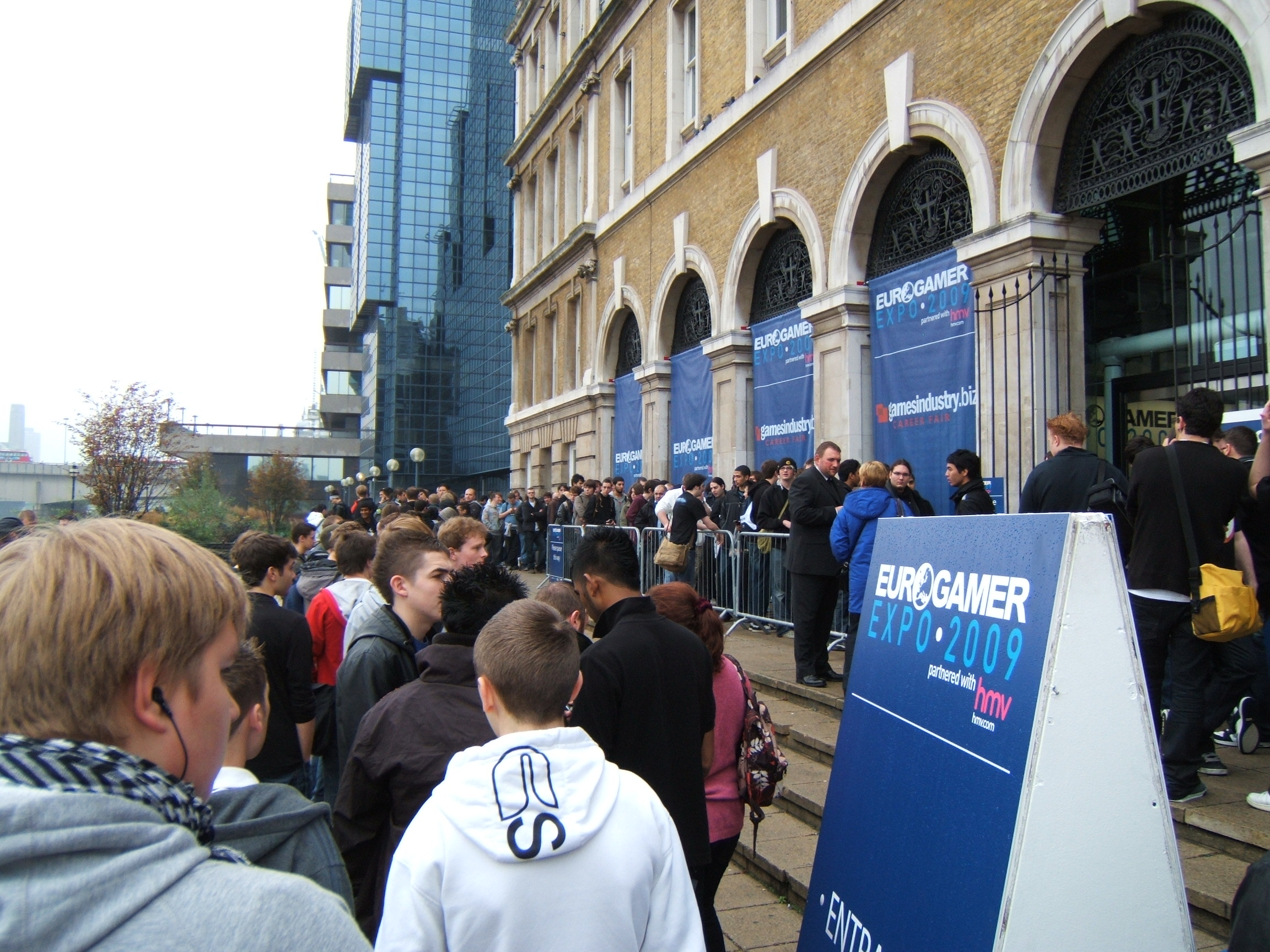
Outside the 2009 Eurogamer Expo at Old Billingsgate Market, London

The first Eurogamer Expo took place at the Old Truman Brewery as part of the London Games Festival 2008 and was attended by 4,000 people. In 2009, the show took place at The Royal Armouries in Leeds and the Old Billingsgate Market in London at the end of October. The event was held at London's Earls Court for the next five years between 2010 and 2014. After the confirmation of the venue's closure, it was announced that EGX would be moving to Birmingham's National Exhibition Centre as part of a multi-year deal.

In 2012, Eurogamer and Rock Paper Shotgun announced Rezzed, a PC and indie games show spun off from Eurogamer Expo. Rezzed was first held at the Brighton Centre on 6–7 July 2012. In September 2012, Eurogamer announced that Eurogamer Expo would also host a Rezzed component.

In October 2013, the Eurogamer Expo was renamed to EGX London, and Rezzed was renamed EGX Rezzed. The EGX London brand was discontinued in 2014, and following the move to Birmingham NEC the show has been called simply EGX.

On 21 February 2018, a third event in Berlin, Germany, was announced.

On 28 November 2018, it was also announced that EGX 2019 would be returning to the ExCel, London.

On 13 March 2020, EGX Rezzed 2020 was originally going to take place from 26 to 28 March 2020, but was postponed to 2–4 July 2020 due to the COVID-19 pandemic before being cancelled altogether. Three months later on 30 June 2020, it was announced that EGX 2020, which was originally going to take place from 17 to 20 September 2020, was also cancelled. On the same day, EGX announced that it was joining forces with PAX to hold a 9-day online event, which will take place from 12 to 20 September 2020, a month later on 27 July 2020, the online event was given a name called PAX Online X EGX Digital.

On 19 February 2021, it was announced that EGX Rezzed and EGX would be returning as live, real-world, in-person events if everything goes to plan with the roll out of COVID-19 vaccinations and they deem it safe to do so within the government guidelines.

On 11 October 2021, it was announced that EGX Rezzed would be renamed as EGX Birmingham and would be returning to the National Exhibition Centre, Birmingham. The renamed EGX Birmingham aims to expand the “Rezzed Zone”, and will offer not just the typical indie showcases, but also allow AAA studios to showcase some spring releases as well. It was originally planned to take place from 4 to 6 March 2022, but was postponed to 2023 due to "the current climate and the knock-on effects of Omicron".

EGX London 2023 was held at the ExCel London through 12 to 15 October, with the headline partner TikTok. The show hosted two Esports tournaments, one for Tekken 7 and one for Street Fighter 6. In 2024, EGX was merged with MCM Comic Con, with the event taking place on 25-27 October. In 2025, ReedPop announced that EGX would once again return to London alongside MCM Comic Con in October, as well as returning to Birmingham in November.

== List of events ==
Event	Dates	Venue	Country
Eurogamer Expo 2008	28–29 October 2008	Old Truman Brewery, London	United Kingdom
Eurogamer Expo 2009	27–28 October 2009	Royal Armouries Museum, Leeds	United Kingdom
Eurogamer Expo 2009	30–31 October 2009	Old Billingsgate Market, London	United Kingdom
Eurogamer Expo 2010	1–3 October 2010	Earls Court Exhibition Centre, London	United Kingdom
Eurogamer Expo 2011	22–25 September 2011	Earls Court Exhibition Centre, London	United Kingdom
Rezzed 2012	6–7 July 2012	Brighton Centre, Brighton	United Kingdom
Eurogamer Expo 2012	27–30 September 2012	Earls Court Exhibition Centre, London	United Kingdom
Rezzed 2013	22–23 June 2013	National Exhibition Centre, Birmingham	United Kingdom
Eurogamer Expo 2013	26–29 September 2013	Earls Court Exhibition Centre, London	United Kingdom
EGX Rezzed 2014	28–30 March 2014	National Exhibition Centre, Birmingham	United Kingdom
EGX London 2014	25–28 September 2014	Earls Court Exhibition Centre, London	United Kingdom
EGX Rezzed 2015	12–14 March 2015	Tobacco Dock, London	United Kingdom
EGX 2015	24–27 September 2015	National Exhibition Centre, Birmingham	United Kingdom
EGX Rezzed 2016	7–9 April 2016	Tobacco Dock, London	United Kingdom
EGX 2016	22–25 September 2016	National Exhibition Centre, Birmingham	United Kingdom
EGX Rezzed 2017	30 March – 1 April 2017	Tobacco Dock, London	United Kingdom
EGX 2017	21–24 September 2017	National Exhibition Centre, Birmingham	United Kingdom
EGX Rezzed 2018	13–15 April 2018	Tobacco Dock, London	United Kingdom
EGX 2018	20–23 September 2018	National Exhibition Centre, Birmingham	United Kingdom
EGX Berlin 2018	28–30 September 2018	STATION, Berlin	Germany
EGX Rezzed 2019	4–6 April 2019	Tobacco Dock, London	United Kingdom
EGX 2019	17–20 October 2019	ExCeL, London	United Kingdom
EGX Berlin 2019	1–3 November 2019	STATION, Berlin	Germany
PAX Online X EGX Digital	12–20 September 2020	Online	Online
EGX Rezzed 2021	15–17 July 2021	Tobacco Dock, London	United Kingdom
EGX 2021	7–10 October 2021	ExCeL, London	United Kingdom
EGX London 2022	22–25 September 2022	ExCeL, London	United Kingdom
EGX London 2023	12–15 October 2023	ExCeL, London	United Kingdom
EGX London 2024	25–27 October 2024	ExCeL, London	United Kingdom
EGX London 2025	24–26 October 2025	ExCeL, London	United Kingdom
EGX Birmingham 2025	28–30 November 2025	National Exhibition Centre, Birmingham	United Kingdom

== Reception ==
EGX won the 2019 Games Event of the Year at the MCV Awards.
