= Adeboye =

Adébóyè is a surname of Yoruba origin, meaning "the crown or royalty meets with chieftaincy".

Notable people with the surname include:

- Enoch Adeboye (born 1942), Nigerian pastor
- Foluke Adeboye (born 1948), Nigerian pastor, televangelist, conference speaker and author
- Gbenga Adeboye (1959–2003), Nigerian singer, comedian, radio presenter and master of ceremony
- Olufunke Adeboye, Nigerian professor

== See also ==
- Adeboyejo
