= NorCal Regionals 2016 =

- 2016

Tournament information
- Sport: Street Fighter V
- Location: Sacramento, California
- Dates: March 25–27
- Tournament format: Double elimination

Final positions
- Champion: Infiltration
- Runner-up: Tokido

NorCal Regionals 2016 (sometimes shortened as NCR 2016) was a Street Fighter V tournament that took place in Sacramento, California on March 25–27. Being one of the eleven Premier Events of the 2016 Capcom Pro Tour, the winner of the tournament automatically qualified for the Capcom Cup in December 2016. As the 14th NorCal Regionals event, NCR 2016 featured a "Pool of Death", where players registering "at the door" rather than in advance were punished by being placed in the same pool with one another. The Pool of Death was won by Vietnamese player Marn, who was knocked out of the Top 8 by Tokido. The tournament was won by Infiltration, who dominated the competition throughout the finals.

== Background ==
As part of the 2016 Capcom Pro Tour, the eventual winner of NorCal Regionals 2016 would be one of the 32 players to qualify for the 2016 Capcom Cup. The tournament, traditionally taking place on Easter weekend, took place a few days after Final Round 19 in Atlanta, Georgia. Falling on March 23–25, the tournament was the second major Street Fighter V tournament since its release a month earlier. Around 350 players registered to participate in the event, including various previous Capcom Cup and Evolution Championship Series champions.

NorCal Regionals 2016 was held in the Capital Plaza Inn in Sacramento, California, and had a prize pool of over $25,000 USD, $15,000 of which was sponsored by Capcom.

Prior to the start of the tournament, Capcom detailed a possible March update for Street Fighter V, featuring the inclusion of a new Challenge-mode, a rematch option, and Street Fighter character Alex. The update would also feature several balancing tweaks for characters and bug fixes. A week before NCR, Capcom took down the Street Fighter V servers for seven hours, possibly to prepare the game for the March update. Capcom announced shortly before the tournament that the update would be brought about on the 28th (the day after NCR), while Alex wouldn't be included until the 30th.

== Participants ==
Prior to the tournament, lead organizer John Choi announced that all players who registered to compete at the event "at the door" would be placed in one pool, dubbed the "Pool of Death". Chung-gon "Poongko" Lee and Ryan "Filipino Champ" Ramirez announced that they would register at the door, and the winner of the Pool of Death elimination rounds would match off against the winner of Pool 15, which included Brentt "Brenttiscool" Franks, Ryan "Gootecks" Gutierrez, and Final Round 19 champion Seon-woo "Infiltration" Lee. The Pool of Death was highly anticipated, as the concept had not been used before at a tournament of this size.

Other high-level participants at NCR 2016 included Eduardo "PR Balrog" Perez and Anton "Filipinoman" Herrera in Pool 5, two of the three highest-placing American players at EVO 2015. Masato "Bonchan" Takahashi and Justin Wong entered the tournament in Pool 13, and Pool 2 featured Du "NuckleDu" Dang, Yuko "ChocoBlanka" Momochi, and Yusuke Momochi.

== Tournament summary ==
"Either do a Pool of Death or make us pay more, but I think doing both is just a big 'f**k you' to anyone interested in coming to their event [at the last minute]."

–Marn on the Pool of Death.

The infamous Pool of Death of the tournament was won by EVO 2010 Tatsunoko vs. Capcom champion Martin "Marn" Phan. Playing as R. Mika, Marn played through the pool's loser's bracket, defeating CJ Showstopper, Saionide, Mago, K-Brad, Winterfox's Gustavo "801 Strider" Romero, Ryota "Kazunoko" Inoue, Anton "Filipinoman" Herrera, Ricki Ortiz, and lastly NuckleDu, before entering the tournament's finals. Ricki Ortiz also made it out of the Pool of Death to enter the Top 8, defeating former Evo champion Kun Xian Ho while doing so.

Marn was to lose to Justin Wong's Karin in the loser's side of the finals, who in turn lost to Tokido the next match, despite Wong defeating Tokido during the first two rounds of their match. The Grand Finals featured a match between Tokido and Infiltration, the latter of which had dominated his bracket up until that point. Using Nash, Infiltration won nine out of his ten last matches during the tournament, and beat Tokido 3–0 in the Grand Finals.

== Results ==
Place	Player	Alias	Character(s)
1st	(South Korea) Seon-woo Lee	RZR|Infiltration	Nash
2nd	(Japan) Hajime Taniguchi	MCZ|Tokido	Ryu
3rd	(United States) Justin Wong	EG|Justin Wong	Karin
4th	(Vietnam) Martin Phan	Marn	R. Mika
5th	(United States) Du Dang	TL|NuckleDu	Nash
5th	(United States) Julio Fuentes	Julio	Ken
7th	(United States) Ricki Ortiz	EG|Ricki Ortiz	Chun-Li
7th	(Japan) Tatsuya Haitani	MJS|Haitani	Necalli
9th	(United States) Gerald Herrera	YP|Filipinoman	Chun-Li
9th	(Singapore) Kun Xian Ho	RZR|Xian	F.A.N.G
9th	(Japan) Masato Takahashi	RB|Bonchan	Ryu
9th	(United States) Reynald Tacsuan	AS|Reynald	Necalli
13th	(Japan) Ryota Inoue	GGP|Kazunoko	Cammy
13th	(United States) Darryl Lewis	RB|Snake Eyez	Zangief
13th	(United States) Andrew Nguyen	Lamerboi	Rashid
13th	(Japan) Kenryo Hayashi	MCZ|Mago	Karin
