= Capcom Cup 2018 =

Street Fighter V tournament

- 2018
- Logo

Tournament information
- Sport: Street Fighter V
- Location: Las Vegas, Nevada
- Dates: December 14–16, 2018
- Tournament format(s): Double elimination
- Venue(s): Esports Arena
- Participants: 32
- Purse: US$250,000

Final positions
- Champion: Kanamori "Gachikun" Tsunehiro
- Runner-up: Hiromiki "Itabashi Zangief" Kumada

Capcom Cup 2018 was a Street Fighter V tournament that was held in December 2018. 32 players qualified for the tournament by scoring high on the game's leaderboards during the 2018 Capcom Pro Tour. The tournament spanned three days from December 14–16, and took place in the Esports Arena in the Luxor Hotel & Casino. The first day of the tournament featured a Last Chance qualifier, which was won by newcomer ZJZ. The finals were won by newcomer Kanamori "Gachikun" Tsunehiro, who defeated Hiromiki "Itabashi Zangief" Kumada.

== Capcom Pro Tour ==
The Capcom Cup was the final tournament of the 2018 season of professional Street Fighter V competitions, the Capcom Pro Tour. Players could qualify for the 2018 Capcom Cup by competing in the seventeen Premier Events, the few dozen smaller tournaments, several online tournaments, and the 2018 Evolution Championship. The 26 players who had accumulated the most points in these events automatically qualified for the tournament. The four winners of the Capcom Pro Tour Regional Finals were also guaranteed a spot in the Capcom Cup.

== Tournament background ==
For the first time since the tournament's inception, the 2018 Capcom Cup did not take place during the PlayStation Experience weekend. Instead the tournament was held in the HyperX Esports Arena in Luxor Hotel & Casino, Las Vegas. The venue was smaller, but also more focused and curated towards Street Fighter players.

The 2018 Capcom Cup took place over the course of three days, beginning with the Last Chance Qualifier held on Friday, December 14. Featuring well over 200 competitors, the champion of the Last Chance Qualifier automatically qualified for the bottom seed of Capcom Cup itself. The Top 32 phase of the Capcom Cup took place on Saturday, December 15. The finals of the Capcom Cup, featuring the top 8 players of the event, took place on Sunday, December 16. The entirety of the tournament was broadcast on the streaming platform Twitch, and was also available on YouTube and Facebook.

== Participants ==
The open Last Chance Qualifier tournament featured over 200 competitors, including Ricki Ortiz, Alex Valle, Bryant "Smug" Huggins, and Darryl "Snake Eyez" Lewis. Capcom Cup 2018 itself featured 32 competitors from 12 different countries. Among the players who qualified for the tournament were Capcom Cup 2017 champion Saul Leonardo Mena "MenaRD" Segundo, Evo 2018 champion Benjamin "Problem X" Simon, Capcom Cup 2016 champion NuckleDu, Capcom Pro Tour 2017 dominant Victor "Punk" Woodley, and long-time top player Daigo Umehara.

Hajime "Tokido" Taniguchi, who placed second in the 2017 Capcom Cup losing to MenaRD, entered the 2018 Capcom Cup with the highest seed, having accrued almost double the tournament points throughout the Capcom Pro Tour compared to other competitors. Ranked second on the leaderboard was Red Bull Kumite 2018 champion Fujimura "Fujimura" Atsushi.

Though South Korean competitor Seon-woo "Infiltration" Lee did qualify for the Capcom Cup in the first half of the Pro Tour, he did not participate in the tournament due to a year-long ban as a result of a domestic violence investigation.

== Tournament summary ==
The Last Chance qualifier was won by Taiwanese competitor Chia-Chen "ZJZ" Tseng, defeating American Dankadillas with the character Menat.

Tokido did not reach the top 8, as he was sent to the loser's bracket by Gachikun in the first round and was knocked out completely by Yusuke Momochi soon after. One of the first round matches of the Top 32 was Street Fighter veteran Justin Wong against Problem X, which Wong won by making good use of the character Menat's zoning. Problem X lost the second round to Kun Xian Ho and was knocked out. Wong was eventually knocked out by Itabashi Zangief in the Top 8, landing on fifth place. Reigning champion MenaRD lost his first round to Problem X and was knocked out by Yusuke Momochi before reaching the top 8 as well. Like MenaRD, fourth seed Keita "Fuudo" Ai also lost his first two rounds back-to-back, being knocked out by Punk. Less established players like Li-Wei "Oil King" Lin, Adel "Big Bird" Anouche, and Gachikun excelled during the tournament, using the newly high tier character Rashid.

The Capcom Cup was won by Kanamori "Gachikun" Tsunehori, who beat the two highest-ranked players of the season during the earlier rounds, Tokido and Fujimura. Gachikun faced Hiromiki "Itabashi Zangief" Kumada in the grand finals with a winner's bracket advantage. Itabashi Zangief, using the character Abigail, beat Gachikun's Rashid three rounds in a row to force a bracket reset. Despite this setback, Gachikun won the second match with a 3–1 scoreline and brought home the title.

== Presentation and side events ==
The Sunday finals were preceded by a Super Street Fighter II Turbo exhibition featuring old-school players, a musical performance by Deltron 3030, and a dance routine from Super Cr3w. Though the Street Fighter II exhibition was considered "entertaining", viewers complained about the relevancy of the music and dance show, which delayed the start of the finals by nearly two hours.

Capcom revealed and launched the "fourth season" of Street Fighter V: Arcade Edition after the 2018 Capcom Cup finals. The company introduced and released the new character Kage, an Evil Ryu-doppelgänger which is described as the physical embodiment of the evil spirit Satsui no Hado. The season 4 patch containing Kage was released two hours into the Sunday finals broadcast, before the character was revealed in the stream. When Yoshinori Ono revealed Kage after the tournament ended, he claimed the early release was an intentional preview.
