= Capcom Cup 2016 =

Street Fighter V tournament

- 2016
- Logo

Tournament information
- Sport: Street Fighter V
- Location: Santa Ana and Anaheim, California
- Dates: December 2–3, 2016
- Tournament format: Double elimination
- Venue(s): eSports Arena (Day one); Anaheim Convention Center (Day two)
- Participants: 32
- Purse: US$350,000

Final positions
- Champion: Du "NuckleDu" Dang
- Runner-up: Ricki Ortiz

Capcom Cup 2016 was a Street Fighter V video game tournament that was held in December 2016. 32 players qualified for the tournament by winning one of the eleven Capcom Pro Tour Global Premier Events, Evo 2016, one of the four regional events, and/or by scoring high on the game's leaderboards. Street Fighter V was released shortly before the start of the 2016 Capcom Pro Tour, replacing Ultra Street Fighter IV from the previous season.

The first day of the Capcom Cup was held at the eSports Arena in Santa Ana, California. Despite scoring highly during the Capcom Pro Tour, Infiltration and Tokido were eliminated during the preliminary rounds without a single win. The finals, held in the Anaheim Convention Center, were won by Du "NuckleDu" Dang, who defeated Ricki Ortiz in the final match.

== Capcom Pro Tour ==
=== Tour background ===
The year 2016 featured the fourth annual Capcom Cup and the third presence of the Capcom Pro Tour. The 2015 Pro Tour featured Ultra Street Fighter IV as the played game, though Capcom released Street Fighter V shortly before the 2016 season. In an interview with Engadget, game designer Yoshinori Ono stated that the company "want[ed] to reset the entire game so that we can reset the playing field and let lots of new people jump in and start competing." Street Fighter V gained some negative attention among the fighting game community due to a poor launch and an inherent input delay discovered during the 2016 season. Xian, whose main character Gen was not yet included in the game, stated in an interview with International Business Times that he had to "relearn everything again" and that "in Street Fighter V, I am worried I can't live up to the expectations."

The return of the Capcom Pro Tour in 2016 was highly expected after Matt Dahlgren, Capcom's director of Brand Marketing and eSports, repeatedly mentioned the importance of esports to the success of (the then upcoming) Street Fighter V. The Tour features a "baseline" prize pool of $500,000 USD, to be spread out over its events. The first major tournament of the Tour, Final Round 19, took place approximately one month after the release of Street Fighter V. In total, 523 players scored points in the ranking.

=== Point accumulation and Cup qualification ===
The Capcom Pro Tour is a series of worldwide qualifying events where players can accumulate official Regional and Global Points in order to qualify for later Capcom-sponsored events, including the Capcom Cup. If a hypothetical player earns 20 points in the North American region and 10 points in the Latin American region, that player will have 20 points on the North American leaderboard, 10 points on the Latin American leaderboard, and a total of 30 points on the Global leaderboard. Each region has a series of ranking events where players can earn points in this manner.

The 2016 Capcom Pro Tour consists of 72 separate events across four different regions: North America, Latin America, Europe, and Asia. Among these 72 events are eleven Global Premier Events, as well as the 2016 Evolution Championship Series (Evo 2016), each of which grand an automatic qualification for the Capcom Cup to the winner. The 2016 Global Premier Events, including Evo 2016, are:

- Final Round 19: Atlanta, Georgia – March 18–20
- NorCal Regionals 2016: Sacramento, California – March 25–27
- Stunfest 2016: France – May 20–22
- Dreamhack Summer: Sweden – June 18–21
- Community Effort Orlando: Orlando, Florida – June 24–26
- G-League: China – July 9
- Evo 2016: Las Vegas, Nevada – July 15–17
- Tokyo Game Show Japan Cup: Tokyo, Japan – September 15
- EGX Rezzed: London, England – September 22–25
- South East Asia Major 2016: Singapore – October 7–9
- SoCal Regionals 2016: Los Angeles, California – October 14–16
- Canada Cup 2016: Toronto, Ontario, Canada – October 28–30

Furthermore, each region would have a closed Regional Finals event. The four champions of these events would similarly automatically qualify for the Capcom Cup. The 16 remaining slots would be filled through the Global Points Leaderboards (eight slots) and the four Regional Point Leaderboards (four times two slots). If a competitor wins more than one Global Premier Event, an additional Capcom Slot opens up on the Global Points Leaderboards. Those that come in second or lower in a Global Premier Event do not automatically qualify for the Capcom Cup as happened last year. Competitors for the Regional Final Events are determined by 12 Ranking Events and two Online Events.

=== Tour summary ===
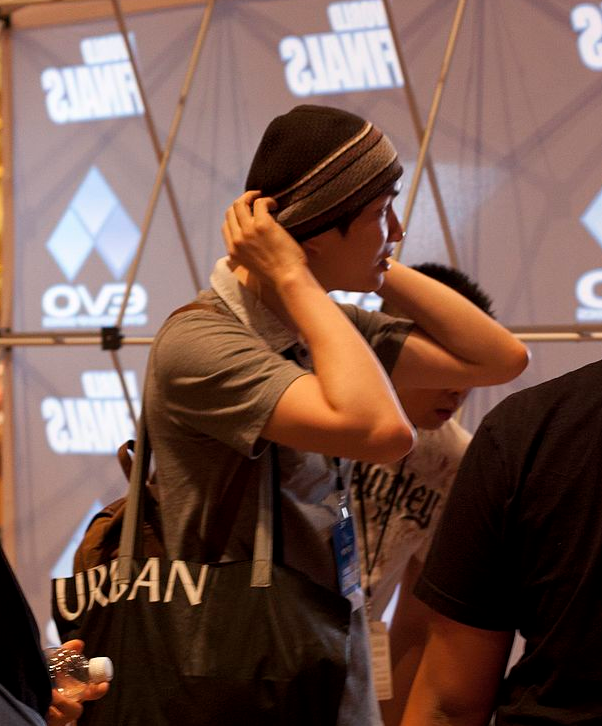
Infiltration won three Premier Events during the 2016 Capcom Pro Tour, including Evolution.

Infiltration was the first player to qualify for the 2016 Capcom Cup after winning Final Round 19 in February, despite running into issues with his arcade controller during the competition. Infiltration went on to win NorCal Regionals 2016 and Evo 2016 as well. Stunfest 2016 was won by Capcom Cup 2014 and Evo 2015 champion Yusuke Momochi, despite his struggling with Street Fighter V at the first major tournaments of the season.

The Swedish festival DreamHack Summer saw a large number of Japanese players competing, including Daigo Umehara, Fuudo, and Tokido. However, the event was won by Norwegian player Arman "Phenom" Hanjani, playing as Necalli and M. Bison. CEO 2016 was won by Japanese fighting game god Tokido in an upset against Infiltration. Meanwhile, Chinese player Zeng "XiaoHai" Zhuojun qualified for the Capcom Cup after taking gold at G-League in Shanghai, beating Singapore player Kun Xian Ho in the finale. Japan Cup 2016, held at the Tokyo Game Show, was won by GamerBee. Canada Cup 2016 was won by NuckleDu who became the first American player to win a Pro Tour Premier Event in two years.

==== Online qualifiers ====
During the second half of the Capcom Pro Tour, each region features two online events. Players that win in one of the 256-person tournaments qualify to compete at their regional finals event, from where they could qualify for the Capcom Cup proper. The first online qualifier was held on July 31 in North America, where Californian Ryu player Miky "XsK Samurai" Chea secured a spot in the North American Regional Ranking Finals in Seattle, Washington. In an interview with Yahoo Esports, XsK Samurai stated he wasn't even aware of what he was competing for, believing he had only won 10-12 points. "My main goal is to improve. To do so well in an online tournament was a surprise. I just wanted to play," XsK Samurai stated.

Seven more online qualifying events are held in August, September, and October. Some of the dates of the online events overlap with official Pro Tour tournaments, forcing some competitors to choose which to attend. Players from Japan, South Korea, Hong Kong, and Taiwan are only able to enter the October 22 event, while the rest of Asia (excluding mainland China) can compete in the August 27 event as well.

==== Regional finals ====
Daigo Umehara became the victor of Europe's Regional Finals having beaten Phenom 3-1 as well as securing a spot for Capcom Cup, Europe's Regional Finals took place at Milan Games Week. The Latin American Regional Finals was won by Dominican player Ray "DR Ray" Rosario using Vega who notably double eliminated Evil Geniuses' resident Cammy player Kenneth "K-Brad" Bradley in Winner's Finals (3-1) and Grand Finals (3-0) in order to take the qualifying spot.

== Controversies ==
In late May 2016, Capcom announced a ban on pornographic sponsors, which primarily centers around Team YP's Valentin "Valmaster" Petit and Anton "Filipinoman" Herrera. Shortly after in early June, Capcom extended the ban towards sponsors that promote tobacco, vaping, and alcoholic beverages. Following Capcom's ban on vaping sponsors, The Steam Company (TSC) announced that their eSports division would be disbanding. In October 2016, Filipinoman announced that he would be leaving Team YP, while Valmaster would stay on the team.

The organization of the Capcom Cup was harshly criticized by those competing in it. Olivier "Luffy" Hay wrote on social media after the conclusion of the tournament that he was disappointed with the program of the Cup and that he found it "impossible to be 100% focused." In particular, he wrote that the tournament "became about who could play the best while exhausted." Infiltration similarly criticized the organization, calling Capcom Cup 2016 "a total mess" in an interview with Core-A Gaming. Infiltration didn't appreciate the waiting time of multiple hours between matches. Capcom failed to look after the 32 players in their most crucial moment, according to Infiltration.

== Tournament background ==
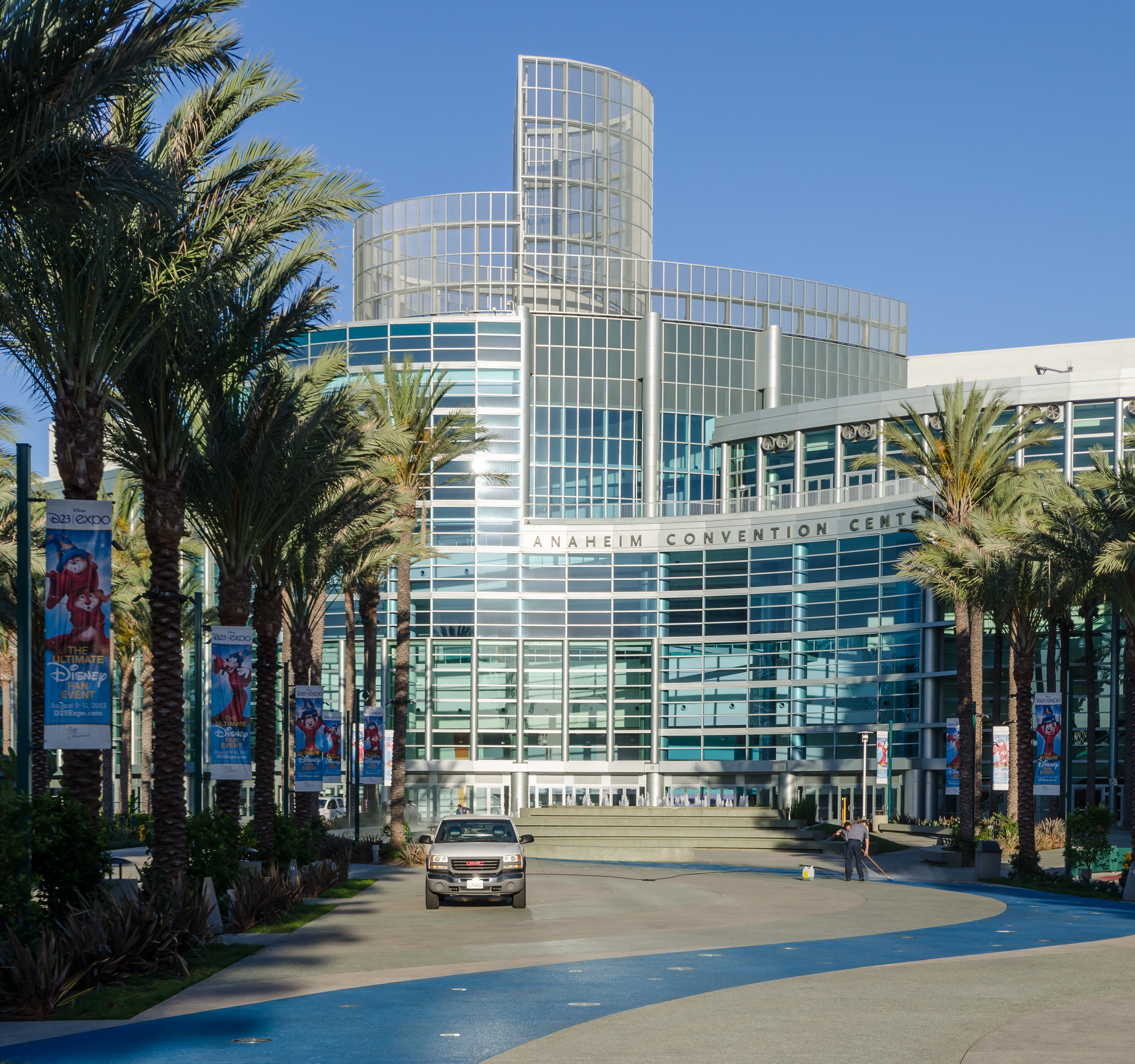
The top eight portion of the tournament took place at the Anaheim Convention Center on the second and final day of the event

Capcom Cup 2016 was held over two days on December 2 and 3, 2016. The first day of the tournament was held at the eSports Arena in Santa Ana, California, where the 32 competitors played in a double elimination tournament until 8 remained. The second day featuring the final 8 competitors finishing the tournament took place at the first day of the annual PlayStation Experience in the Anaheim Convention Center in Anaheim, California. Initially, the tournament was announced as playing top 16 on a first-to-three format with matches in the first two rounds played first-to-two as had been done at Capcom Cup 2015, but following community feedback Capcom revised the rules to have the entire tournament played first-to-three.

During a panel at Evo 2016, Capcom announced a Capcom Pro Tour Premier Package DLC package for Street Fighter V. 30% of the revenue of this video game bundle would be added to the prize pool of the Capcom Cup and 50% of the revenue is used to cover the production cost of the Capcom Pro Tour, essentially allowing fans to crowdfund a portion of the championship event. The bundle includes a new stage titled "the Ring of Destiny", which is depicted as a wrestling ring emblazoned with a Capcom Pro Tour logo. During this panel, Capcom also reiterated that the company would not make any major changes to the gameplay of Street Fighter V during the rest of the Pro Tour, including the eight-frame input delay.

Despite Capcom's statement, the input latency was reduced to 6.5 frames in a September 2016 patch. That same month, Capcom announced that the Capcom Cup prize pool was boosted by $90,000 from their Capcom Pro Tour 2016 DLC content. They also revealed the third costume for their Pro Tour promotion content in the form of a Necalli costume designed by Capcom Cup 2015 champion Ryota "Kazunoko" Inoue.

Capcom has banned a total of three stages from being legal in the Capcom Pro Tour. The Grid (training stage) was banned since Evo 2016 as players could use the grid background as a crutch to improve their spacing. Kanzuki Beach was banned on release as the water on half of the stage obscures ground projectiles such as Birdie's can/bananas and Juri's Fuharenkyaku fireball. After its DLC release, Capcom decided to ban the Skies of Honor stage from the Capcom Cup as well, as players noted that it causes motion sickness and headaches for some.

== Tournament summary ==
The first day of the Capcom Cup, held at the Esports Arena, was described as a "bloodbath" by ABC News, as 24 out of 32 players were eliminated from the tournament. Infiltration and Tokido, who were highly successful during the Pro Tour, were knocked out without a single win. Yusuke Momochi and GamerBee were similarly removed from the tournament with only a single win. The eight winners of the preliminary rounds were Chun-Li-player Joe "MOV" Egami, Necalli-player Haitani, Nash-player Yukadon, Rainbow Mika-player and Evo 2016 runner-up Fuudo, Chun-Li-player Goichi "Go1" Kishida, and Cammy-player and Capcom Cup 2015 champion Kazunoko. Lastly, North American Finals champion NuckleDu made it through the first day playing with Rainbow Mika, Guile, and Nash, and Chun-Li-player Ricki Ortiz was described as "one of the bigger surprises" of the tournament.

Throughout the top 8, close matches were common, though NuckleDu went through the entire second day winning 3-to-0 or 3-to-1. At no point did any of his matches go to the final game. Ricki Ortiz played against NuckleDu in the winner's finals, where she was knocked down into the loser's bracket after a 3–1 loss. She went on to defeat Kazunoko in losers finals to meet NuckleDu again the grand finals. In grand finals, NuckleDu triumphed over Ortiz again, defeating her Chun-Li with his Rainbow Mika in another 3-to-1 game. The victory made NuckleDu became the first-ever American champion of a Street Fighter game at Capcom Cup.

== Results ==
32 players competed at Capcom Cup 2016, seven of which qualified by winning one or more Global Premier Event during the 2016 Capcom Pro Tour. An additional four players qualified through winning the regional finals held towards the end of the year. Players with the highest global or regional ranking during the Capcom Pro Tour qualified for the Capcom Cup as well. If qualified through multiple methods, a Premier Event or Regional Final win takes precedence over Global Leaderboard place, which in turn takes precedence over a Regional Leaderboard spot.

Place	Player	Alias	Character(s)	Qualification
1st	(United States) Du Dang	Liquid|NuckleDu	R. Mika, Guile	Canada Cup 2016
2nd	(United States) Ricki Ortiz	EG|Ricki Ortiz	Chun-Li	NA Regional Points
3rd	(Japan) Ryota Inoue	GGP|Kazunoko	Cammy	Global Points
4th	(Japan) Tatsuya Haitani	YD.MJS|Haitani	Necalli	Global Points
5th	(Japan) Keita Ai	RZR|Fuudo	R. Mika	Global Points
5th	(Japan) Joe Egami	MOV	Chun-Li	Global Points
7th	(Japan) Atsushi Fujimura	YD|Yukadon	Nash	Global Points
7th	(Japan) Goichi Kishida	CO|Go1	Chun-Li	Global Points
9th	(China) Zhuojun Zeng	Qanba|Xiao Hai	Cammy	G-League 2016
9th	(France) Olivier Hay	RB|Luffy	R. Mika	Global Points
9th	(Singapore) Kun Xian Ho	RZR|Xian	F.A.N.G	Global Points
9th	(Norway) Arman Hanjani	BX3|Phenom	Necalli	DreamHack Summer 2016
13th	(Japan) Daigo Umehara	BST|Daigo Umehara	Ryu	EU CPT Regional Finals
13th	(France) Nathan Massol	MD|Mister Crimson	Laura, Dhalsim	Global Points
13th	(Japan) Hiroyuki Nagata	GW|Eita	Ken	Global Points
13th	(United States) Ryan Ramirez	PG|Filipino Champ	Dhalsim	Global Points
17th	(Japan) Kenryo Hayashi	Mago	Karin	AO CPT Regional Finals
17th	(Japan) Naoto Sako	HORI|Sako	Chun-Li	AO Regional Points
17th	(United States) Miky Chea	WFX|Samurai	Ryu	NA Regional Points
17th	(Dominican Republic) Ray Rosario	GAM|DR Ray	Vega	LA CPT Regional Finals
17th	(Japan) Yusuke Momochi	EG|Momochi	Ken	Stunfest 2016
17th	(Taiwan) Bruce Hsiang	ZW|GamerBee	Necalli	Japan Cup 2016
17th	(United States) Kenneth Bradley	EG|K-Brad	Cammy	LA Regional Points
17th	(Hong Kong) Jonny Cheng	HuomaoTV|HumanBomb	Chun-Li	AO Regional Points
25th	(South Korea) Seon-woo Lee	RZR|Infiltration	Nash	Final Round 19
25th	(Brazil) Thomas Proença	F3|Brolynho	Necalli	LA Regional Points
25th	(United States) Chris Tatarian	DNL|Chris Tatarian	Ken	Global Points
25th	(United Kingdom) Benjamin Simon	PxP|Problem X	Alex	EU Regional Points
25th	(Japan) Hajime Taniguchi	Tokido	Ryu	CEO 2016
25th	(United States) Julio Fuentes	FOX|Julio Fuentes	Ken	Global Points
25th	(United States) Justin Wong	EG|Justin Wong	Karin	Global Points
25th	(United Kingdom) Ryan Hart	Ryan Hart	Ken, Guile	EU Regional Points

1. Global Leaderboard (GL): For unknown reasons, the 11th global leaderboard place holder, Younes "CCL" Lazaar of Belgium, was unable to attend Capcom Cup. To replace him, Yukadon was chosen to fill in as the next player on the global leaderboard not qualified by a global points spot.
2. Latin America (LA): Due to visa issues, the 2nd Latin American leaderboard place holder, Felipe "Misterio" Torres of Chile, was unable to attend Capcom Cup. To replace him, K-Brad was chosen to fill in as the next unqualified player on the Latin American leaderboard.
3. Asia/Oceania (AO): For unknown reasons, the 2nd Asia/Oceania leaderboard place holder, Tse "Tse4444" Wa Ping of Hong Kong, was unable to attend Capcom Cup. Originally, Yukadon was chosen to fill in as the next unqualified player on the Asian leaderboard; following Yukadon's elevation to a global points spot (see note GL above), HumanBomb filled in the spot as the next unqualified player.
