= Canada Cup 2016 (fighting game event) =

2016 video game competition in Toronto, Canada

Canada Cup 2016 was a fighting game event that took place in Toronto, Canada, on October 28–30, 2016. The seventh incarnation of the Canada Cup hosted 14 tournaments: games that were played at the event ranged from Street Fighter II Turbo to The King of Fighters XIV. The Street Fighter V tournament held at Canada Cup 2016 was the last Premier Event of the 2016 Capcom Pro Tour: its champion NuckleDu automatically qualified to compete in the 2016 Capcom Cup.

== Background ==
The sixth incarnation of the annual Canada Cup organised by Lap Chi Duong was hosted in a Holiday Inn in Toronto, Canada, on October 28–30. Described by Motherboard as the "largest and most prestigious fighting game tournament in the country," the Canada Cup featured a US$15,000 prize pool for its Street Fighter V tournament as well as a spot for the 2016 Capcom Cup. The Street Fighter tournament featured a "pool of death" set-up similar to that of NorCal Regionals the same year, allowing players to enter the competition at the door, though with a large disadvantage.

To promote the Super Smash Bros. Melee tournament, Duong "invaded" the Twitch streams of high-level Super Smash Bros. players Armada, Hungrybox, and Mang0 – using a donation of US$895 in order to get their attention – asking them to attend the competition. Duong stated in an interview with Motherboard that the "Five Gods" of Super Smash Bros. are difficult to reach due to their large fanbase, giving him the idea of reaching them through a publicity stunt. The stunt greatly increased attendance of the Super Smash Bros. Melee tournament. Mang0 however pulled out of the tournament due to him wanting to spend time with his son on Halloween.

73 people entered the Super Street Fighter II Turbo tournament held at Canada Cup 2016—18 more than in a similar tournament held at Evo 2016. Despite the age of the game, Red Bull stated that Super Street Fighter II Turbo is going through a kind of "North American renaissance", as new players enter the Street Fighter V scene with memories of their childhood. Canada Cup has been the biggest gathering of high level players of this game since 2014.

The Canada Cup was the first qualifying tournament for the 2017 King of Fighters XIV World Championship. The Super Smash Bros. for Wii U event was won by 15-year-old Mexican, Leonardo "MKLeo" Pérez.

== Street Fighter V tournament summary ==
The Street Fighter V tournament at Canada Cup 2016 featured various upsets and surprises. Norwegian player Arman "Phenom" Hanjani dominated most of the tournament – defeating Daigo Umehara 3-0 – until being defeated by Chris Tatarian. Though Kenneth "K-Brad" Bradley managed to defeat Infiltration in a 2-1 set, he lost to NuckleDu in a later round.

Canada Cup 2016 was the first Capcom Pro Tour Premier Event since The Fall Classic in October 2014 to be won by an American player: Du "NuckleDu" Dang. However, as he had already qualified for the Capcom Cup through the Global Leaderboards, NuckleDu's automatic qualification primarily freed up a spot for another high-ranking player. NuckleDu won the tournament after defeating Zhuojun "Xiao Hai" Zeng in the grand finals, playing a strong R. Mika.

== Results ==
Place	Player	Alias	Character(s)
1st	(United States) Du Dang	Liquid|NuckleDu	R. Mika, Guile
2nd	(China) Zhuojun Zeng	DouyuTV|Xiao Hai	Cammy
3rd	(Norway) Arman Hanjani	BX3|Phenom	Necalli
4th	(Japan) Ryota Takeuchi	/r/Kappa|John Takeuchi	Rashid
5th	(Japan) Masato Takahashi	RB|Bonchan	Nash
5th	(United States) Alex Myers	RN|Alex Myers	Cammy
7th	(Japan) Shinya Ohnuki	OR|Onuki	Chun-Li
7th	(Japan) Daigo Umehara	BST|Daigo Umehara	Ryu
9th	(South Korea) Han-byeol Lee	Xyzzy	Birdie
9th	(United States) Kenneth Bradley	EG|K-Brad	Cammy
9th	(Japan) Yohei Tanaka	8765|Daikokugo	Birdie
9th	(United States) Hsien Chang	Hsien Chang	Juri
13th	(Singapore) Kun Xian Ho	RZR|Xian	F.A.N.G
13th	(United States) Ricki Ortiz	EG|Ricki Ortiz	Chun-Li
13th	(South Korea) Seon-woo Lee	RZR|Infiltration	Nash, Rashid
13th	(United States) Ryan Ramirez	PG|Filipino Champ	Dhalsim
