= Japan Cup 2016 =

Video game tournament

The Japan Cup was a Street Fighter V tournament held at the 2016 Tokyo Game Show On September 17, 2016. As a Premier Event of the Capcom Pro Tour, the winner of the event automatically qualified for the 2016 Capcom Cup. The tournament was won by GamerBee, who defeated Poongko in the finale.

== Background ==
The Tokyo Game Show has been a major gaming convention held in Tokyo since 1996. The Tokyo Game Show became part of the Capcom Pro Tour at its inception in 2014. The Street Fighter tournaments held at the event were traditionally sponsored by Mad Catz, but due to significant financial issues – losing more than $4.3 million from April to December 2015 – Mad Catz was forced to drop their sponsorship of the 2016 event. The company also dropped their sponsorship deal with two Street Fighter players: Taniguchi "Tokido" Hajime and Hayashi "Mago" Kenryo. Capcom confirmed that the tournament was to be held as scheduled regardless. The Japan Cup was one of three esports tournaments that were held at the Tokyo Game Show on September 17.

Unlike prior instances of the tournament, the Japan Cup featured an open 256-player bracket. However, the tournament had an unexpected large amount of registrants, with over 100 people signing up to compete within an hour after the registrations opened. A few hours later, the Japan Cup organizers announced that they were forced to hold a lottery to see who would compete. At the time, the tournament's organization told Yahoo Esports that there would be no preferential treatment for any players. Tokido, Fuudo, Yusuke Momochi, and Infiltration, who had all already qualified for the Capcom Cup, were absent from the tournament. Regardless, many established players with strong contending positions on the Capcom Pro Tour leaderboard attended, such as Kun Xian Ho, Daigo Umehara, and Justin Wong.

== Tournament summary ==
The Daily Dot reported after the first day of the tournament that Japanese players such as Go1, Eita, and Kazunoko were playing well, making it through their respective pools, while American players such as alucarD and Gootecks were not able to do so. However, Taiwanese player GamerBee faced off against South-Korean player Poongko in the finale. GamerBee defeated his opponent and won the Japan Cup by playing a highly defensive Necalli. Timothy Lee of ESPN noted that the tournament "solidified" the tier list of Street Fighter V, with Cammy, Ken, Chun-Li and Karin being popular picks in the top 8.

== Results ==
Place	Player	Alias	Character(s)
1st	(Taiwan) Bruce Hsiang	ZW|GamerBee	Necalli
2nd	(South Korea) Chung-gon Lee	Secret|Poongko	Cammy
3rd	(Japan) Ryota Inoue	GGP|Kazunoko	Cammy
4th	(Japan)	Rinta	Ken
5th	(Japan) Joe Egami	MOV	Chun-Li
5th	(Japan) Kenryo Hayashi	Mago	Karin
7th	(Japan) Kanamori Tsunehori	Gachikun	Rashid
7th	(Japan) Hiroyuki Nagata	HM|Eita	Ken
9th	(Japan)	Cojiro	Chun-Li
9th	(Japan) Ryota Takeuchi	John Takeuchi	Rashid
9th	(Japan) Naoto Sako	HORI|Sako	Chun-Li
9th	(Japan) Hikari Nishikawa	Hikarin	Necalli
13th	(Japan) Takuto Sato	BegetaminB	Chun-Li
13th	(Japan) Goichi Kishida	HM|Go1	Chun-Li
13th	(Japan)	Kitipaamu	Zangief
13th	(Japan)	Nauman	Ken
