= Capcom Pro Tour 2016 regional finals =

- 2016

Tournament information
- Sport: Street Fighter V
- Location: Milan, Italy; São Paulo, Brazil; Seattle, Washington; Melbourne, Australia
- Dates: October 15–November 19
- Tournament format: Double elimination

The regional finals of the 2016 Capcom Pro Tour were a series of closed Street Fighter V tournaments held throughout the world. The champions of the four different regions – North America, Latin America, Europe, and Asia – automatically qualified to compete at the 2016 Capcom Cup. People qualified to compete in their regional finals by scoring highly on their regional leaderboard or winning ranking events during the 2016 Capcom Pro Tour. The four tournaments all took place between October 15 and November 19, 2016.

== General background ==
During the 2016 Capcom Pro Tour, people competing at any of its 72 tournaments gained points on both the "regional" or "global" leaderboard, the former of which depending on the location of the tournament. Among these 72 tournaments, twelve "ranking events" and two "online events" were held in each region. The champion of each of these 14 events qualified for their regional finals, while 18 more qualified by placing high on the regional leaderboards. The four champions of the regional finals all automatically qualified to compete at the 2016 Capcom Cup.

== Tournaments ==
Four regional finals took place throughout the world between October 15 and November 19, 2016. These events were held in Europe, Latin America, North America, and Asia.

=== Europe ===
The European regional finals of the 2016 Capcom Cup were the first of the four events, held during the Milan Games Week in Milan, Italy on October 15–16. The tournament, produced by FACEIT Media, featured an open 256 player "Last Chance Qualifier" on the first day, the top two players of which qualifying for the 16-player regional finals taking place on day 2. The Last Chance Qualifier was won by two Japanese players: Naoto Sako and Masato "Bonchan" Takahashi. Other Asian players who won enough European tournaments to qualify for the European regional finals included Daigo Umehara, Joe "MOV" Egami, and Kun Xian Ho. Besides these, the finals featured eleven high-level European players such as Olivier "Luffy" Hay. The regional finals was eventually won by Daigo Umehara, who defeated Arman "Phenom" Hanjani in the grand finals.

EU Regional Finals results

Place	Player	Alias	Character(s)
1st	(Japan) Daigo Umehara	BST|Daigo Umehara	Ryu
2nd	(Norway) Arman Hanjani	BX3.TP-Link|Phenom	Necalli
3rd	(Japan) Masato Takahashi	RB|Bonchan	Nash
4th	(United Kingdom) Sean Dench	DA|ImStillDaDaddy	Guile
5th	(France) Olivier Hay	RB|Luffy	R. Mika
5th	(Singapore) Kun Xian Ho	RZR|Xian	F.A.N.G
7th	(United Kingdom) Marcus Parker	PRLS|Packz	Karin
7th	(Japan) Joe Egami	MOV	Chun-Li
9th	(Belgium) Younes Lazaar	AWS|CCL	Chun-Li
9th	(Republic of Ireland) Chris McEntee	Rize|Cobelcog	Cammy
9th	(Japan) Naoto Sako	HORI|Sako	Chun-Li
9th	(France)	GS|TKR	Chun-Li
13th	(United Kingdom) Benjamin Simon	PxP|Problem X	Alex
13th	(United Arab Emirates) Abdulla Buhannad	Fruit	Laura
13th	(France) Nathan Massol	MD|Mister Crimson	Dhalsim
13th	(France) Christ Onema	AWS|Akainu	Nash

=== Latin America ===
The Latin American regional finals were held on Wednesday, November 2 in São Paulo. Like the European finals, the Latin American event featured an open Last Chances Qualifier before the main tournament. The Latin American regional finals was won by Dominican competitor Ray "DR Ray" Rosario, who, playing as Vega defeated the Brazilian Diego "Dark817" Lins Gois and the American Kenneth "K-Brad" Bradley in the final rounds. Brazilian favorite Keoma "Keoma" Pacheco was defeated by K-Brad in the semi-finals.

LatAm Regional Finals results

Place	Player	Alias	Character(s)
1st	(Dominican Republic) Ray Rosario	GAM|DR Ray	Vega
2nd	(United States) Kenneth Bradley	EG|K-Brad	Cammy
3rd	(Brazil) Keoma Pacheco	Innova|Keoma	Karin
4th	(Brazil) Diego Gois	Umbrella|Dark817	Alex
5th	(Chile) Felipe Torres	Brook|Misterio	Karin
5th	(Dominican Republic) Lenny Matos	SP|Crossover	R. Mika, M. Bison
7th	(France) Wilfried Jean-Baptiste	Will2Pac	Laura
7th	(Chile) Álvaro Cruz	DM|Baek	Nash
9th	(Brazil) Ericke Maciel	Ericke Maciel	Chun-Li, R. Mika
9th	(Chile) Richard Clivio	Chancho Kay	Laura
9th	(Mexico) Antonio Medrano	Kusanagi	Karin
9th	(Brazil) Renato Martins	AAG|DidimoKOF	Dhalsim
13th	(Brazil) Vitor Luiz	Umbrella|Tubarao	Necalli
13th	(Brazil) Robson Santos	JAM.FGBR|RobKOF	Ryu, Birdie
13th	(Brazil) Thomas Proença	F3|Brolynho	Alex, Ibuki
13th	(Mexico) David Gomez	MJ|Gama	Cammy

=== North America ===
The North American finals were hosted by Red Bull GmbH and held on November 4 to 6 in the Seattle Exhibition Hall. The first two days of the event featured an open bracket of 1,024 competitors, while the official qualifying tournament was held on the final day. The event was named the Red Bull Battlegrounds and was described by PC Gamer as a "high-budget, extremely well produced event," akin to a television game show. After the conclusion of the tournament, the character Akuma was announced to be added to the game.

The top eight of the tournament featured a large number of well-established American players, such as Justin Wong, K-Brad, and Ricki Ortiz. The finals of Red Bull Battlegrounds was held between NuckleDu and Tokido. NuckleDu lost to Tokido in the first round of the top eight, but managed to come back through the loser's bracket and face Tokido again in the finale, where he defeated him through a bracket-reset. As NuckleDu had already qualified for the Capcom Cup, the qualifying spot opened up for another player on the global leaderboard.

NA Regional Finals results

Place	Player	Alias	Character(s)
1st	(United States) Du Dang	Liquid|NuckleDu	Guile, R. Mika
2nd	(Japan) Hajime Taniguchi	Tokido	Ryu
3rd	(United States) Victor Woodley	ANBU|Punk	Karin, Cammy
4th	(United States) Justin Wong	EG|Justin Wong	Karin
5th	(Taiwan) Arubi Kao	RB	Urien
5th	(United States) Kenneth Bradley	EG|K-Brad	Cammy
7th	(United States) Ricki Ortiz	EG|Ricki Ortiz	Chun-Li
7th	(United States) Antwan Ortiz	F3|alucarD	Balrog, Birdie
9th	(United States) Julio Fuentes	FOX|Julio Fuentes	Ken
9th	(United States) Ryan Ramirez	PG|Filipino Champ	Dhalsim
9th	(United States) Chris Tatarian	DNL|Chris Tatarian	Ken
9th	(United States) Miky Chea	XSK Samurai	Ryu
13th	(Japan) Ryota Takeuchi	/r/Kappa|John Takeuchi	Rashid
13th	(United States) Ludovic Mbock	NS|Ludovic	Chun-Li
13th	(United States) Peter Susini	Flash	Vega
13th	(United States) Raynel Hidalgo	PG|RayRay	Chun-Li

=== Asia ===
Australia's Battle Arena Melbourne 8 and OzHadou Nationals were two of the twelve ranking events for the Asian regional finals. The Asian regional finals took place on October 17–19 at the Global Game Exhibition in Busan, South Korea. The tournament was won by Kenryo "Mago" Hayashi, beating Joe "MOV" Egami in the grand finals. As Mago had already qualified for the Capcom Cup, his qualifying spot went on to Tse "Tse4444" Wa Ping, who was ranked eleventh in the Asian leaderboard.

Asia Regional Finals results

Place	Player	Alias	Character(s)
1st	(Japan) Kenryo Hayashi	Mago	Karin
2nd	(Japan) Joe Egami	MOV	Chun-Li
3rd	(Japan) Tatsuya Haitani	YD.MJS|Haitani	Necalli
4th	(Japan) Ryota Inoue	GGP|Kazunoko	Cammy
5th	(Japan) Hiromiki Kumada	DNG|Itabashi Zangief	Zangief
5th	(Japan) Masato Takahashi	RB|Bonchan	Nash
7th	(Hong Kong) Jonny Cheng	HuomaoTV|HumanBomb	Chun-Li
7th	(South Korea) Seon-woo Lee	RZR|Infiltration	Nash, Rashid
9th	(Taiwan) Bruce Hsiang	ZW|GamerBee	Necalli
9th	(United States) Ricki Ortiz	EG|Ricki Ortiz	Chun-Li
9th	(Japan) Hiroyuki Nagata	HM|Eita	Ken
9th	(Japan) Naoto Sako	HORI|Sako	Chun-Li
13th	(Japan) Atsushi Fujimura	YD|Yukadon	Nash
13th	(Hong Kong) Chris Wong	Chris Wong	Nash
13th	(Japan) Goichi Kishida	HM|Go1	Chun-Li
13th	(Singapore) Kun Xian Ho	RZR|Xian	F.A.N.G
