= Final Round =

Final Round may refer to:

- Final round, the last stage of a tournament
- Final Round (Code Lyoko), an episode of Code Lyoko
- An annual fighting game tournament held in Georgia since 1997:
  - Final Round 19
  - Final Round 20
  - Final Round 21
- "Final Round", a song by Adonxs from Age of Adonxs (2022)
- "Final Round", a song by Lights from A6Extended (2025)

== See also ==
- The Final Round, a boxing-themed video game
