= Final Round 19 =

- 2016

Tournament information
- Sport: Street Fighter V
- Location: Atlanta, Georgia
- Dates: March 18–20
- Tournament format: Double elimination

Final positions
- Champion: Infiltration
- Runner-up: Tokido

Final Round 19 was a fighting game tournament that took place in Atlanta on March 18–20, 2016. Being the first of the eleven Street Fighter V Premier Events of the 2016 Capcom Pro Tour, the winner of the tournament automatically qualified for the Capcom Cup in December 2016. The finals featured a variation of Japanese and United States players, both young and old, though was won by Korean player Infiltration. The arcade controllers of three high-level Razer Inc.-sponsored players failed during the final day of the tournament, which prompted the company to temporarily pull out its sponsorship deals. The organization of the event was criticized by Community Effort Orlando-founder Alex Jebailey.

== Background ==
Final Round 19, taking place on March 18–20, was the second tournament of the 2016 Capcom Pro Tour, following Cannes Winter Clash in France. Final Round 19 was the first Pro Tour Premier Event where Street Fighter V was played rather than Ultra Street Fighter IV. Due to the game's recent launch, no tier lists were created yet to indicate which characters would likely dominate the tournament.

Other fighting game tournaments hosted at Final Round 19 included Ultra Street Fighter IV, Mortal Kombat X, Killer Instinct, Tekken 7, Dead or Alive 5: Last Round, and Soulcalibur V.

== Street Fighter V finals summary ==
"With a blend of eight different characters representing the final eight players in the tournament, Street Fighter 5 is already off to a fantastic start."

— Timothy Lee, ABC News

The finals of the Final Round Street Fighter V tournament featured three United States players – Nando, brenttiscool, and SonicFox – four Japanese players – Tokido, Mago, Haitani, and Go1-3151 – and Infiltration as the lone South-Korean representative. The top 8 was described by Red Bull's Chris Higgins as "East vs West", and featured a mix of both veteran and younger players. One of the talked-about topics during the tournament was how American players would compare to their Asian counterparts, as Street Fighter V had a near-simultaneous global launch. Higgins described Japan and South Korea topping the results as "a real fist to the face of the homeground turf."

American players SonicFox and Nando came as a surprise, playing strong games despite neither of them having ever been big on the Street Fighter scene. The four Japanese players were all veterans at the time of the tournament, though GO1 wasn't known for his skill at Street Fighter either. Infiltration dominated throughout the tournament, defeating nine out of eleven opponents in the Top 8.

== Razer arcade stick failures ==
During the Street Fighter V Grand Finals, the arcade controllers of Razer Inc.-sponsored players Fuudo and Xian shut down in the middle of key matches, while the controller of Infiltration ran into connectivity issues with the PlayStation 4. Razer CEO Ming-Liang Tan wrote in a statement on Facebook that the arcade sticks ran into problems because they were prototype units that are still in development. Despite the sticks functioning without issue for the few months before Final Round 19, the three controllers seemed to encounter a firmware bug during the tournament. Tan elaborated that Razer would pull out its sponsorship deals for later fighting game community events until new arcade controllers were ready for use.

It is unknown whether the stick failures influenced the course of the tournament, though Xian may have been knocked into the loser's bracket due to the incident and it may have caused Fuudo to be eliminated entirely. According to The Country Caller, Infiltration has said in a Korean talk show to only use shells of Razer, modding the insides to suit his purpose. Infiltration was able to win the tournament despite the connectivity errors. The event has been compared to Yusuke Momochi's Razer stick failing at the EVO 2015 Grand Finals.

== Criticism ==
Alex Jebailey, founder of Community Effort Orlando, spoke out regarding poor conditions at Final Round 19, criticizing the tournament's organization. He stated on a Facebook post how he heard from multiple participants that they were disqualified because they didn't know their pool assignments in time. Jebaily himself was disqualified from the Killer Instinct tournament due to a no-show after his pool was moved to an earlier time. Joshua McWhorter, Tekken General organizer for Final Round 19, described the state of the show as "inexcusable", though he took issue with the accusation that his staff did not go all out on providing a "great experience".

Final Round organizer Larry "Shin Blanka" Dixon announced that the flagship tournament series would come to an end after Final Round 2018. Dixon stated in his announcement that the established infrastructure and staff had difficulty handling the increased attendance after the release of Street Fighter V in 2016, and Dixon described the consistent complains of overcrowding and poor scheduling during Final Round 19 and 20 as a "social media witch hunt". Notably, Dixon stated: "I understand now that Final Round was dead after Final Round 19 and I was holding on for two years trying to breathe life into a dead body."

== Results ==
Place	Player	Alias	Character(s)
1st	(South Korea) Seon-woo Lee	RZR|Infiltration	Nash
2nd	(Japan) Hajime Taniguchi	MCZ|Tokido	Ryu
3rd	(Japan) Kenryo Hayashi	MC|Mago	Karin
4th	(Japan) Tatsuya Haitani	MJS|Haitani	Necalli
5th	(United States) Nando Tovar	pH|Nando Tovar	R. Mika
5th	(United States) Brentt Franks	Brenttiscool	Ken
7th	(United States) Dominique McLean	cR|SonicFox	F.A.N.G.
7th	(Japan) Kishida Goichi	GC|Go1	Chun-Li
9th	(United States) Justin Wong	EG|Justin Wong	Karin
9th	(United States) Peter Susini	Flash Metroid	Vega
9th	(United States) Du Dang	Liquid|NuckleDu	Nash
9th	(Japan) Ryota Inoue	GGP|Kazunoko	Cammy
13th	(United States) Darryl Lewis	RB|Snake Eyez	Zangief
13th	(United States) Anthony Nguyen	pH|Crackfiend	Chun-Li
13th	(United States) Julio Fuentes	Julio Fuentes	Ken
13th	(United States) Ryan Ramirez	PG|Filipino Champ	Dhalsim
