= Red Bull Battlegrounds =

Red Bull Battlegrounds is an annual United States Street Fighter V tournament. The tournament is the North American regional final of the Capcom Pro Tour and has been held twice:

- Capcom Pro Tour 2016 regional finals
- Capcom Pro Tour 2017 regional finals
