= 2016 Canada Cup =

2016 Canada Cup may refer to:

- 2016 Canada Cup of Curling
- Canada Cup 2016 (fighting game event) in fighting videogames e-sports tournament
- 2016 Canada's Cup in yacht match racing regatta

== See also ==
- 2016 in sport
- 2016 in Canada
- Canada Cup (disambiguation)
