= Capcom Pro Tour 2024 =

Capcom Pro Tour 2024 is the eleventh edition of the Capcom Pro Tour, an annual season of Street Fighter tournaments that are officially sponsored by Capcom. It is the second season to be played on Street Fighter 6. Players compete in offline Premier events and online World Warrior tournaments for a chance to qualify for Capcom Cup 11 in 2025.

== Format ==
=== Premier ===
Unlike the previous two seasons, all Premier events are held offline and in-person. There are eight tournaments of this kind, including the Evo 2024 tournament, with the champion of each Premier qualifying for Capcom Cup 11. Two of the eight tournaments are labelled as Super Premiers, where the runner-up also qualifies for the Cup.

=== World Warrior ===
The online side of the Capcom Pro Tour, the World Warrior, is divided into 24 regions. Each region will compete in five tournaments to earn points for a chance to qualify for the regional finals, where the champion qualifies for Capcom Cup 11. Fourteen regions, labelled as Super Regions, where the player who scores the most points after the first five tournaments will automatically qualify for the Cup.

In total, 48 players (10 from Premier events and 38 from World Warrior tournaments) will qualify for the Cup.

== Premier tournaments ==
Capcom Pro Tour 2024 features eight Premier tournaments across six countries.

Tournament	Location	Date (Note: The date listed is the final day of the corresponding tournament.)	Champion	Other qualifiers
Evo 2024	(United States) Las Vegas, Nevada	July 21, 2024	(United States) Punk	—N/a
Cream City Convergence 2024	(United States) Milwaukee, Wisconsin	August 24, 2024	(Dominican Republic) MenaRD	—N/a
Ultimate Fighting Arena 2024	(France) Aubervilliers	September 15, 2024	(France) Kusanagi	—N/a
East Coast Throwdown 2024	(United States) Hartford, Connecticut	October 13, 2024	(Japan) Itabashi Zangief	—N/a
Singapore Super Premier	Singapore	October 20, 2024	(Japan) Shuto	(United States) Nephew
Japan Super Premier	(Japan) Tokyo	November 3, 2024	(Japan) Tokido	(South Korea) Leshar
Blink Respawn 2024	(Dominican Republic) Santo Domingo	November 10, 2024	(United States) NoahTheProdigy	—N/a
Kings of the World	(United Kingdom) London	December 15, 2024	(South Korea) Armperor	
