= Final Round 2018 =

- 2018

Tournament information
- Sport: Street Fighter V
- Location: Atlanta, Georgia
- Dates: March 16–18
- Tournament format(s): Double elimination

Final positions
- Champion: Infiltration
- Runner-up: Tokido

Final Round 2018 or Final Round 21 was a fighting game event that took place in Atlanta on March 16–18, 2018. Being the first of the Street Fighter V Premier Events of the 2018 Capcom Pro Tour, the winner of the tournament automatically qualified for the Capcom Cup in December 2018. The event also hosted the first major Dragon Ball FighterZ tournament.

== Background ==
Final Round 2018 took place on March 16–18 in Atlanta, Georgia and featured various fighting game tournaments, including the first international Dragon Ball FighterZ tournament. 314 players signed up for the FighterZ tournament, and over 350 players participated in Final Round 2018's Street Fighter V tournament. Both games featured participants from Japan, Korea, Brazil, the Dominican Republic, the United Kingdom, and China. A playable build of Soul Calibur VI was available for entrants at Final Round 2018. This was the first chance for fans of the franchise to see live gameplay of the title.

After Final Round 2018, the tournament's organizer Larry "Shin Blanka" Dixon announced that the Final Round series would come to an end. The established Final Round infrastructure and staff had difficulty handling the increased attendance after the release of Street Fighter V in 2016, and Dixon described the consistent complains of overcrowding and poor scheduling during Final Round 19 and 20 as a "social media witch hunt". In conclusion, Dixon said of Final Round 2018 that it "was the best Final Round I've ever been a part of and I thank everyone that was there this weekend. I truly appreciate it from the bottom of my heart."

== Street Fighter V tournament summary ==
Final Round 2018's Street Fighter V: Arcade Edition tournament concluded with a match between Seonwoo "Infiltration" Lee and Hajime "Tokido" Taniguchi. Tokido, playing as Akuma, came in from the loser's side to fight Infiltration's Menat. The Winner's Finals were close, but Infiltration managed to outlast his opponent and move on to the Grans Finals. Here, Tokido caused a bracket reset by defeating Infiltration 3-2. However, Infiltration eventually won the Grand Finals reset with a 3-1 lead, taking home 60% of the tournament's prize pool.

Infiltration revealed that he had signed with Panda Global on the last day of Final Round 21.
