= Capcom Pro Tour 2018 =

The 2018 Capcom Pro Tour is the fifth edition of the Capcom Pro Tour, an annual season of Street Fighter V tournaments that are officially sponsored by Capcom. The 2018 Capcom Pro Tour followed several months after the release of Street Fighter V: Arcade Edition and started off with Final Round 21 on March 16. Similarly to the 2017 season, this season featured seventeen Premier Events, a few dozen smaller tournaments, several online tournaments, and the Evolution Championship. In these tournaments, competitors gained points needed to qualify for the 2018 Capcom Cup, which was held in December.

== Background ==
On January 16, 2018, Capcom released Street Fighter V: Arcade Edition for PC and PlayStation 5. Capcom releases only one major balance update for Street Fighter V each year, which greatly defines the experience of competitors during the Capcom Pro Tour. Several balance changes were made to address issues that arose during the 2017 Capcom Pro Tour. Twelve new player characters were added to the game in Arcade Edition, bringing the total character count up to 28. Six more DLC characters were released throughout the year, starting with Sakura in January. Street Fighter V was also given a major mid-season balance update in April.

Capcom announced in February 2018 that this year would be "Esports Year One" for the company. Besides supporting the Capcom Pro Tour as it has since 2014, the company unveiled the Capcom Esports Club and awarded $90,000 USD in prize money for the Tokyo Game Show Street Fighter V Premier Event.

It was considered for a series of Marvel vs. Capcom: Infinite tournaments to be held alongside Street Fighter V during the 2018 Capcom Pro Tour, but Capcom announced in February 2018 that the game would not be included.

== Point accumulation and Cup qualification ==
Like in the previous year, competitors could accumulate points and climb the Pro Tour leaderboards by placing highly in Pro Tour-sponsored tournaments. Of the 32 players who qualified for the 2018 Capcom Cup, most did so by garnering points. The Capcom Pro Tour featured several types of tournaments. Placing first at a Premier Event awarded a competitor with 700 points on the leaderboard. A victory at Evo 2018 awarded a player 1,750 points, second place picking up 850 points.

The smaller Ranking Events were made less important in the 2018 Pro Tour, as the Premier Events and Evolution increased in relevance. This made it more difficult for players in regions with fewer Premier Events, such as South America, to qualify for the Cup.

The Capcom Pro Tour includes "Regional Finals" in Europe, Asia, North America, and South America. These events feature a regular open Premier Event, as well as an invitational last-chance qualifier tournament. In this closed qualifier, the top 8 players of the local Pro Tour leaderboard competed for a guaranteed position in the Capcom Cup.

== Major tournaments ==
The 2018 Capcom Pro Tour featured seventeen Premier Events across nine countries. These were:

Tournament	Location	Date	Type
Final Round 2018	Atlanta, Georgia	2018-03-16	Premier Event
NorCal Regionals 2018	Sacramento, California	2018-03-30	Premier Event
Stunfest 2018	Rennes, France	2018-05-18	Premier Event
Combo Breaker 2018	Chicago, Illinois	2018-05-25	Premier Event
TWFighter Major 2018	Taipei City, Taiwan	2018-06-16	Premier Event
Community Effort Orlando 2018	Daytona Beach, Florida	2018-06-29	Premier Event
VSFighting 2018	Birmingham, England	2018-07-20	Premier Event
Evolution Championship Series 2018	Las Vegas, Nevada	2018-08-03	Evo
Esports Festival Hong Kong 2018	Wan Chai, Hong Kong	2018-08-25	Premier Event
Final Fighters China	China	2018-09-01	Premier Event
Dreamhack Montreal	Montreal, Canada	2018-09-07	Premier Event
SoCal Regionals 2018	Los Angeles, California	2018-09-14	Premier Event
EGX – EU Regional Final	Birmingham, England	2018-09-20	Regional Finals
Tokyo Game Show	Tokyo, Japan	2018-09-21	Premier Event
SEAM 2018 Asia Regional Final	Singapore	2018-10-13	Regional Finals
Canada Cup 2018	Toronto, Canada	2018-10-26	Premier Event
LATAM Regional Finals 2018	Sao Paulo, Brazil	2018-11-02	Regional Finals
Red Bull North American Regional Finals 2018	Washington DC	2018-11-17	Regional Finals

=== Capcom Cup ===
The Capcom Cup concluding the 2018 Pro Tour was held in the Esports Arena in Las Vegas on December 14–16. The tournament began with a "Last Chance Qualifier" event, which filled the final spot of the 32-person Capcom Cup bracket. The tournament's first prize was set to $250,000 USD. Capcom Cup 2018 was won by Kanamori "Gachikun" Tsunehori, defeating Hiromiki "Itabashi Zangief" Kumada in the grand finals. No. 1 seed and Evo 2017 champion Taniguchi "Tokido" Hajime dropped out early during the tournament, alongside various other high-seeded players.

== Downloadable content ==
At the end of Combo Breaker 2018, the character Cody was announced to be added to Street Fighter V. Cody became available for download on June 26.
