= PVP Live =

American esports news website

- Available in: English
- Owners: J. Casey Wehr (CEO), Chester Srp
- Website: pvplive.net

PVP Live was an American esports news website. It was founded in 2012 and included a statistics database. The website was owned by PVP Live Interactive, Inc. PVP Live came out of its most recent beta on June 8, 2015. The company is based in Frisco, Texas.

== History ==
Prior incarnations of the organization include the Heroes Live, PVE Live, and Hearth Live websites, and a podcast.

The third production of Tavern Takeover was widely criticized for poor sound production, resulting in the CEO issuing a public apology and stating that sound issues would be a thing of the past.

In 2015, the website planned on producing a 24-hour online show along the lines of ESPN's Sports Center.

On May 23, 2016, the site broke the news that ESPN was in talks with Riot Games to purchase television broadcast rights for League of Legends content for approximately $500 million. Several hours later, both ESPN and Riot Games issued statements that the story created by PVP Live was false.

PVP Live ran the Hearthstone Pro League, a professional Hearthstone competition, produced in partnership with Twitch, Blizzard Entertainment and PRG. The $60,000 prize pool tournament was officially announced on May 27, 2015. The company was unable to actually pay the top finishers of the competition and refused to answer questions concerning the matter. Later on April 13, 2016, it announced it would pay out the prize money if another organization would pick up all associated costs, excluding the prize pool. The company later also hosted competitions in World of Warcraft alongside its Hearthstone offerings.

As of June 8, 2016, PVP Live had raised around US$2 million in private funding.

On February 5, 2018, PVP Live shut down all operations immediately. The company gave users with a remaining account balance 180 days to withdraw their funds. Chief marketing officer Scotty Tidwell said on social media that the closure came as a surprise to him, describing the effort he had put into growing the platform in the preceding period.
