= Community Effort Orlando =

Annual fighting game event

Community Effort Orlando (CEO)

Tournament information
- Sport: various fighting games
- Location: 2010-2017 in Orlando, Florida; 2018-2024 Daytona Beach, Florida; 2025- Orlando, Florida
- Month played: June
- Established: 2010
- Number of tournaments: 1 annually
- Administrator: Alex Jebailey

Current champion
- SFV:AE: (Japan) Bonchan; SSBU: (United States) Dabuz; MK11: (United States) SonicFox; Tekken 8: (Pakistan) Atif Butt; SSBM: (United States) Plup; Guilty Gear Xrd Revelator: (United States) LostSoul; DBFZ: (Japan) GO1; SCVI: (United States) Bluegod; UNIST: (United States) RedBlade; BlazBlue: Central Fiction: (Japan) Fenritti; BBTag: (United States) TempestRomeo; DoA6: (United States) XCaliburBlades

Final champion
- Injustice 2: Semiij; MvCI: Knives; MKX: SonicFox; Killer Instinct: Thompxson; Pokkén: Suicune Master; SSB4: MkLeo; UMVC3: KaneBlueRiver; USF4: Wolfkrone

Community Effort Orlando (often shortened to CEO) is an annual fighting game event held in Orlando, Florida. Introduced in 2010 and organized by Alex Jebailey, the event is known for its strong ties to the fighting game community. Fighting game players compete in a wrestling ring during the event's tournaments, and CEO has been a mainstay of the Capcom Pro Tour since its establishment in 2014. An annual side-event titled CEOtaku was initiated in 2015. From 2018 to 2024, CEO was held in Daytona Beach, Florida.

== Background ==
"I have no reason to ever leave Orlando. I went to school here, I grew up here, and I've always worked in Orlando. Now, because of CEO and all the other events I get to do, I get to travel, but I always come back to Orlando. It's a great place."

— –Alex Jebailey

Described in 2016 as one of the biggest fighting game community events in the United States by Red Bull, CEO has been running annually since 2010 and has grown exponentially every year. Organized by Alex Jebailey, the event is known primarily for emphasizing community spirit. Jebailey's goal as CEO is to ensure the entertainment of all its attendees. The event has an "infamous" wrestling ring in which tournament players compete and those who reach the finals make professional wrestling style entrances.

Jebailey himself has been interested in video game competition since 1993, when he won a local Street Fighter II Turbo tournament on the Super Nintendo Entertainment System. He has competed in various tournaments during the 1990s and 2000s, including Mortal Kombat and Killer Instinct competitions, as well as professional trading card game contests. Here, he got the inspiration and experience to become a tournament organizer. Jebailey joined Iron Galaxy in 2014.

== History ==
=== 2010–2013 ===
In 2010, there was a fighting game event that was "supposed to" happen in Orlando, but things did not come together until Alex Jebailey was assigned as Tournament Organizer three weeks prior to when the event was planned. He named the event Community Effort Orlando, managed the tournament brackets on his own, and ran the stream with one colleague. Florida was not known for having an active fighting game community, though the 2010 open tournament totaled 300 players.

CEO was held on June 10–12 in 2011. Orlando Business Journal reported in 2012 that CEO was growing steadily, having reached 1,600 attendees and 30,000 online viewers. Jebailey stated that his presence on social media such as Twitter and Facebook has allowed the event to grow in size. At this point, CEO was part of the "Road to Evo" series of major ranking events.

CEO 2013 had over 1,800 attendees. The day after winning a CEO tournament, Marvel vs. Capcom 3 player Noel Brown was arrested for "domestic violence battery" after allegedly attacking his ex-girlfriend and a fellow tournament player.

=== 2014 ===
CEO was held on June 27–29 in 2014 and was one of the ten Premier Events of the first annual Capcom Pro Tour, meaning that high-ranking players of the Ultra Street Fighter IV tournament at CEO could qualify for the 2014 Capcom Cup. CEO 2014 was also sponsored by One Frame Link, and Jebailey sold CEO-themed T-shirts based on the various games played during the event in order to crowdfund the prize pool of each tournament.

=== 2015 ===
CEO, taking place on June 26–28, was one of the sixteen Capcom Pro Tour events of the 2015 season, and the winner of its Ultra Street Fighter IV tournament automatically qualified for the 2015 Capcom Cup. Capcom revealed the first playable demo of Street Fighter V at CEO 2015. Held at the Wyndham Orlando Resort, CEO 2015 brought in over 3,000 attendees.

At the CEO 2015 Ultra Street Fighter IV tournament, well-known players such as Infiltration, Tokido, Yusuke Momochi, and Daigo Umehara were all eliminated before reaching the finals. The tournament was won by Kazunoko, who beat 801 Strider in the winner's bracket semi-final and defeated Fuudo in the Grand Final. As a response to the consistent success of Super Smash Bros.-player ZeRo throughout the 2015 season, Jebailey gave out a prize to whoever could knock him out of the CEO 2015 tournament. As a response, Smashboards owner Chris "AlphaZealot" Brown added more money to the "bounty". Regardless, ZeRo won the tournament, defeating Nairo in the Grand Final.

=== 2016 ===
"I did what it took, and it costed a couple thousand dollars for the extra security, but if it helps people feel safer and have a better time it's more than worth it to me."

— –Alex Jebailey

CEO 2016 took place two weeks after the Orlando nightclub shooting. Jebailey quickly responded to people's worries regarding personal safety on social media that he would redouble the event's security. In an interview with Red Bull, Jebailey stated that "We understand bad things happen in the world, but if I can spend a weekend with my community and get away from it... I can't imagine anything better."

CEO 2016, again a Capcom Pro Tour Premier Event, featured ten major fighting game tournaments, including Ultra Street Fighter IV side-to-side with Street Fighter V. Jebailey stated in an interview that there was a large amount of interest in the older game within the Florida fighting game community. Orlando Business Journal reported that the event had over 4,000 attendees from 46 states and more than 25 countries. Besides major tournaments of new games such as Pokkén Tournament, The King of Fighters XIV, and Guilty Gear Xrd, the event included a "free-to-play" video game arcade and a guest appearance of professional wrestlers Xavier Woods and Kenny Omega.

=== 2017 ===
Jebailey announced in July 2016 that CEO 2017 would move away from its traditional late-June date in order for the event to be held in a new venue. The event may even move to a different city. Later, CEO 2017 was announced to be held again in the Wyndham Resort in Orlando from June 16 to 18. The event featured tournaments for Street Fighter V, Tekken 7, Super Smash Bros. Melee, Super Smash Bros. for Wii U, Injustice 2, Pokkén Tournament, Ultimate Marvel vs. Capcom 3, Killer Instinct, The King of Fighters XIV, Guilty Gear Xrd, and BlazBlue: Central Fiction. Microsoft Studios announced at CEO 2017 that the 2013 version of Killer Instinct would be released on the Steam platform.

=== 2020–present ===
CEO 2020 was postponed from June until December due to the COVID-19 pandemic. Later, on October 1, 2020, the official CEO website announced that CEO 2020 would be canceled, and that its return was scheduled to be on June 25–27, 2021. CEO 2022 was held from June 24–26.

== Other events ==
=== Wrestling events ===
In 2018, it was announced that New Japan Pro-Wrestling would host an event at the tournament, which was held Saturday night following the end of the day's matches. The event was named CEO×NJPW: When Worlds Collide. Jebailey made his wrestling debut at the event and defeated Michael Nakazawa.

In 2019, new promotion All Elite Wrestling partnered with CEO to produce Fyter Fest. Jebailey once again wrestled Nakazawa, this time under hardcore stipulations, but failed to win the match.

=== CEOtaku ===
Jebailey set up a side event called CEOtaku in October 2015. A portmanteau of CEO and otaku, the event focused specifically on Japanese 2D fighting games, often referred to as "anime fighters". Such games have historically not gotten as much attention among the fighting game community. Jebailey got the idea of starting CEOtaku when he noticed that Florida features many anime conventions throughout any given year, and was inspired when he saw a side-event at Evo 2015 dubbed "ANIMEvo". CEOtaku has since become an annual event as well.

=== Dreamland ===
In April 2017, Jebailey hosted CEO Dreamland, a Super Smash Bros.-focused event featuring tournaments for each game in the series. The event attracted nearly 1,100 attendees, but failed to return its production cost. Jebailey blamed the lack of attendees in comparison to his annual CEO events on poor scheduling, as Dreamland took place on Easter weekend and coincided with the annual Star Wars Celebration at Walt Disney World. Following its near $20,000 USD loss, Dreamland was originally thought to be unlikely to return, however on April 18, 2019, Jebailey confirmed that CEO Dreamland would return. CEO Dreamland 2020 was held at the Wyndham Hotel in Orlando. The tournament was won by Samsora, who donated a fraction of his earnings back to CEO after winning.

=== DDR Storm ===
Since 2016, CEO has also been the home of the Florida-based Dance Dance Revolution tournament, DDR STORM. Once a small side event to the larger fighting game tournaments, STORM has grown alongside the competitive DDR scene with each passing year, and is now regarded as one of the most prestigious DDR tournaments in the world. 2018's tournament was notable for having (at the time) the most entries for an in-person DDR tournament in history. STORM tournaments have also been held for related rhythm games Pump It Up and In the Groove.

== List of Events ==
=== CEO Fighting Game Championships ===
Event	Dates	Venue	Location	Games	Ref
CEO 2010	June 5-6, 2010	Central Florida Fairgrounds	Orlando, Florida	Capcom vs SNK; Marvel vs Capcom 2 Super Smash Bros. Melee; Super Smash Bros. Brawl; Super Street Fighter II Turbo HD Remix; Super Street Fighter IV; Tekken 6	
CEO 2011	June 10-12, 2011	Central Florida Fairgrounds	Orlando, Florida	Marvel vs. Capcom 3 Mortal Kombat; Soulcalibur IV; Super Smash Bros. Melee; Super Smash Bros. Brawl; Super Street Fighter IV: Arcade Edition; Tekken 6	
CEO 2012	June 15-17, 2012	Wyndham Orlando International Drive Resort	Orlando, Florida	BlazBlue: Continuum Shift; Mortal Kombat; Skullgirls; Soulcalibur V Super Street Fighter II Turbo; Super Street Fighter IV; Street Fighter x Tekken; Tekken 6 The King of Fighters XIII	
CEO 2013	June 15-17, 2013	Wyndham Orlando International Drive Resort	Orlando, Florida	Divekick; Injustice: Gods Among Us; Mortal Kombat; Persona 4 Arena; Skullgirls; Soulcalibur V Super Street Fighter IV; Street Fighter x Tekken; Ultimate Marvel vs Capcom 3 Tekken Tag Tournament 2 The King of Fighters XIII	
CEO 2014	June 27-29, 2014	Wyndham Orlando International Drive Resort	Orlando, Florida	BlazBlue: Chrono Phantasma; Capcom vs. SNK 2 Divekick; Injustice: Gods Among Us; Persona 4 Arena; Tekken Tag Tournament 2 The King of Fighters XIII; Killer Instinct	
CEO 2015	June 26-28, 2015	Wyndham Orlando International Drive Resort	Orlando, Florida		
CEO 2016	June 24-26, 2016	Wyndham Orlando International Drive Resort	Orlando, Florida		
CEO 2017	June 16-18, 2017	Wyndham Orlando International Drive Resort	Orlando, Florida		
CEO 2018	June 29-July 1, 2018	Ocean Center	Daytona Beach, Florida		
CEO 2019	June 28-30, 2019	Ocean Center	Daytona Beach, Florida		
CEO Online	June 27-28, 2020	Online			
CEO 2021	December 3-5, 2021	Wyndham Orlando International Drive Resort	Orlando, Florida		
CEO 2022	June 24-26, 2022	Ocean Center	Daytona Beach, Florida		
CEO 2023	June 23—25, 2023	Ocean Center	Daytona Beach, Florida		
CEO 2024	June 28-30, 2024	Ocean Center	Daytona Beach, Florida		
CEO 2025	June 13-15, 2025	Rosen Shingle Creek	Orlando, Florida		

=== CEO Winterfest ===
Event	Dates	Venue	Location	Games	Ref
CEO Winterfest 2014	January 31, 2014 - February 1, 2014	Wydnham Orlando International Drive Resort	Orlando, Florida		
CEO Winterfest 2018	March 3, 2018	I-Drive NASCAR	Orlando, Florida		

=== CEOtaku ===
Event	Dates	Venue	Location	Games	Ref
CEOtaku 2015	October 17-18, 2015	Wyndham Orlando International Drive Resort	Orlando, Florida		
CEOtaku 2016	October 1-2, 2016	Wyndham Orlando International Drive Resort	Orlando, Florida		
CEOtaku 2017	September 23-24, 2017	Wyndham Orlando International Drive Resort	Orlando, Florida		
CEOtaku 2018	September 21-23, 2018	Wyndham Orlando International Drive Resort	Orlando, Florida		
CEOtaku 2019	September 27-29, 2019	Wyndham Orlando International Drive Resort	Orlando, Florida		
CEOtaku 2022	September 23-25, 2022	Wyndham Orlando International Drive Resort	Orlando, Florida		
CEOtaku 2023	September 22-24, 2023	Wyndham Orlando International Drive Resort	Orlando, Florida		
CEOtaku 2024	December 20-22, 2024	Orange County Convention Center	Orlando, Florida		

=== CEO Dreamland ===
Event	Dates	Venue	Location	Games	Ref
CEO Dreamland 2017	April 14-16, 2017	Wyndham Orlando International Drive Resort	Orlando, Florida		
CEO Dreamland 2020	March 13-15, 2020	Wyndham Orlando International Drive Resort	Orlando, Florida		
