= Kazunoko (gamer) =

Japanese fighting games player

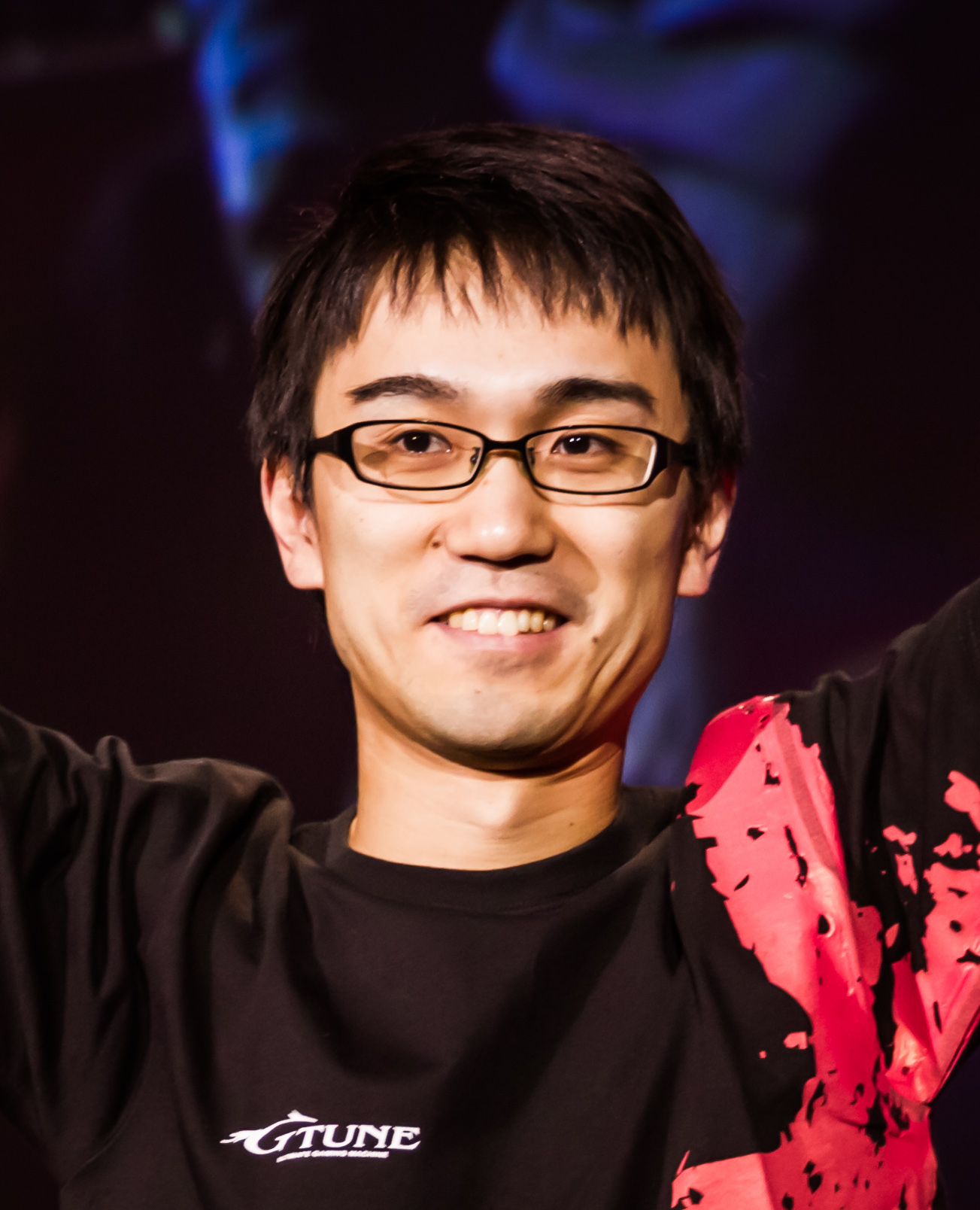
- Kazunoko at Capcom Cup 2015

Personal information
- Name: Ryota Inoue
- Nationality: Japanese

Current team
- Team: Burning Core
- League(s): Capcom Pro Tour; Evolution Championship Series; Dragon Ball FighterZ World Tour

Team history
- 2015: Zeveron
- 2016–2019: Team Godsgarden
- 2019–2024: Burning Core
- 2024–present: Crazy Raccoon

Career highlights and awards
- 2× SBO champion (2011, 2012); Capcom Cup champion (2015); DBFZ World Tour champion (2019)

Ryota Inoue (Japanese: 井上涼太, Hepburn: Ryota Inoue) better known by this nickname Kazunoko (かずのこ), is a Japanese fighting games player known for playing Holy Order Sol in Guilty Gear XX Accent Core Plus R, Yun in Street Fighter IV, Cammy in Street Fighter V, Yamcha in Dragon Ball FighterZ and Raven in Guilty Gear Xrd: Revelator. He was the winner of Ultra Street Fighter IV at Capcom Cup 2015 where he beat Daigo Umehara in the grand finals. He joined Zeveron in July 2015. However Zeveron went out of business the following months and they failed to pay him, resulting in him being a free agent.

In 2015 Kazunoko also won CEO and placed second at Canada Cup. He got 9th at EVO 2015. At Capcom Cup 2015 he went through the bracket undefeated, with wins over Gustavo "801 Strider" Romero, Benjamin "Problem X" Simon, Du "NuckleDu" Dang, Lee "Infiltration" Seon-woo, Daigo Umehara, and finally a 3–2 victory over Daigo again in the grand finals.

In 2018–19, Kazunoko participated in and dominated the inaugural Dragon Ball FighterZ World Tour by winning four of the seven official DBFZ events. He became the Dragon Ball FighterZ world champion in 2019 by winning the first Red Bull Final Summoning

In May 2024, Kazunoko joined Crazy Raccoon.

== Tournament results ==
=== Super Street Fighter IV: Arcade Edition v2012 ===
- Canada Cup 2013 - 3rd
- EVO 2013 - 13th

=== Ultra Street Fighter IV ===
- EVO 2014 - 13th
- Tokyo Game Show 2014 - 5th
- Community Effort Orlando (CEO) 2015 - 1st
- Tokaigi - Game Party Japan 2015 - 1st
- SXSW Gaming Expo 2015 - 2nd
- Shadowloo Showdown 6 - 2nd
- Canada Cup Master Series 2015 - 2nd
- South East Asia Major 2015 - 4th
- KVO x TSB 2015 - 4th
- Arcade Stream 2015 - 4th
- Final Round 18 - 4th
- NorCal Regionals 2015 - 7th
- EVO 2015 - 9th
- Tokyo Game Show 2015 - 13th
- Stunfest 2015 - 13th
- Capcom Cup 2015 - 1st

=== Street Fighter V ===
- EVO 2016 - 9th
- Capcom Cup 2016 - 3rd
- EVO 2017 - 3rd
- EVO 2019 - 33rd

=== Guilty Gear Xrd -SIGN- ===
- Canada Cup Master Series 2015 - 1st
- Vancouver Street Battle - 1st
- Shadowloo Showdown 6 - 1st
- Final Round 18 - 1st
- NorCal Regionals 2015 - 1st
- Double Elimination 2015 - 1st
- Stunfest 2015 - 1st
- South East Asia Major 2015 - 2nd
- Community Effort Orlando (CEO) 2015 - 1st
- SoCal Regionals 2015 - 1st
- CEOtaku - 2nd
- Canada Cup 2015 - 1st

==== Guilty Gear Xrd -REVELATOR- ====
- CEO 2016 - 2nd
- EVO 2016 - 5th

==== Guilty Gear Xrd -REVELATOR 2- ====
- EVO 2017 - 5th
- Evo Japan 2018 - 3rd
- Stunfest 2018 - 1st

=== Guilty Gear XX Accent Core ===
- CEOTaku - 1st

=== Dragon Ball FighterZ ===
- CEO 2018 - 1st
- SEA Major 2018 - 1st
- Japan Saga 2018 - 1st
- CouchWarriors Crossup Major 2018 - 1st
- Red Bull Final Summoning DBFZ World Tour Finals - 1st
- EVO 2019 - 7th
- National Championship Japan Playoffs 2020 - 1st
