= NuckleDu =

American professional esports player

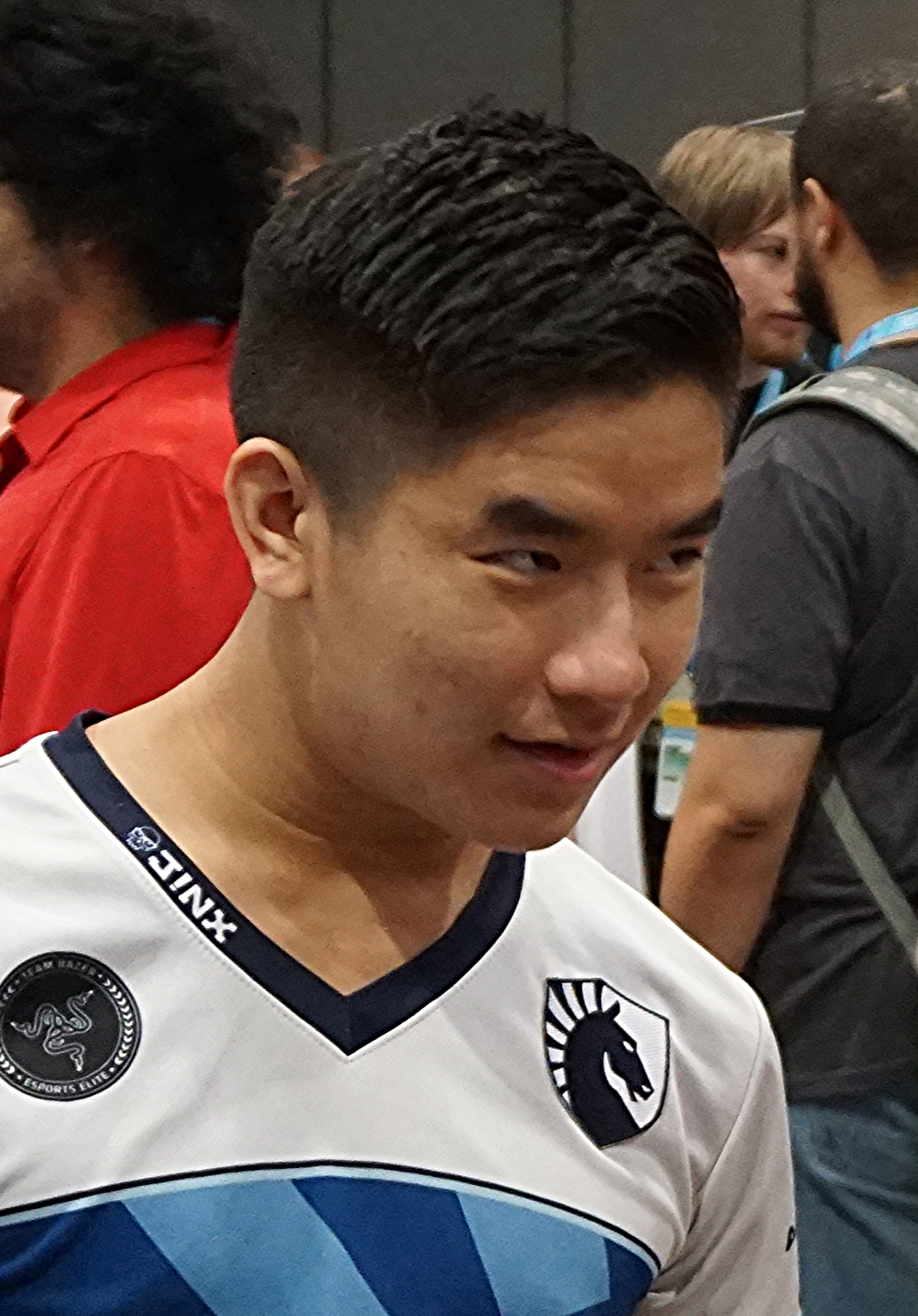
- NuckleDu at Evo 2016

Personal information
- Name: Du Dang
- Born: May 12, 1996 (age 30); Tampa, Florida
- Nationality: American

Career information
- Games: Street Fighter series
- Playing career: 2012–present

Team history
- 2014–2015: Team Curse
- 2015–2017: Team Liquid
- 2018–2019: Ghost Gaming
- 2019–2020: Echo Fox
- 2023-present: Shopify Rebellion

Du Dang (born May 12, 1996), more commonly known by his nickname NuckleDu, is an American fighting game player known for playing Guile and Decapre in Ultra Street Fighter IV, Guile and Zangief in Street Fighter X Tekken, and Guile and Rainbow Mika in Street Fighter V. NuckleDu was ranked as the 13th best player in Ultra Street Fighter IV by EventHubs, and was ranked at #19 in the previous year and #32 in 2013. In Street Fighter V, he was the most successful player in the latter half of Season 1.

== Gaming career ==
NuckleDu is one of the best players in the United States, and has multiple major tournaments victories. In 2012 he qualified for the Street Fighter 25th Anniversary Grand Finals through the New York City qualifier while netting 13th place being sponsored by Empire Arcadia at the time. He was invited for 2013's Capcom Cup for the Street Fighter X Tekken event in which he received fifth place, being defeated by Justin Wong in Winners and Dexter "Tampa Bison" James in Losers Finals. In August 2014, NuckleDu announced his departure from Empire Arcadia following several other players during the few months. A few months after his EMP departure, he would be signed by professional eSports company Team Curse. NuckleDu would later qualify into 2014's Capcom Cup through the points leaderboards, being ranked at 6th out of the non-qualified players. He would proceed to get 9th place notably upsetting Darryl "Snake Eyez" Lewis in the process.

In 2015, Team Curse merged into Team Liquid which resulted in NuckleDu being acquired by the latter. NuckleDu notably won both Apex 2015 and Combo Breaker in dominant fashion, defeating Snake Eyez and Ricki Ortiz in their respective grand finals. At EVO 2015, NuckleDu placed 7th out of ~2200 people in Ultra Street Fighter IV, bowing out to Bruce "GamerBee" Hsiang. During the summer, there was some controversy regarding the EGL Dallas tournament, which NuckleDu won the Ultra Street Fighter IV tournament and was promised $5,000 in prize winnings. However, EGL failed to pay him as well as other tournament winners; EGL would later declare bankruptcy. NuckleDu was one of the 32 players in the 2015 Capcom Cup in which he placed 13th, also being the second highest placing American in the tournament. He qualified once again through points leaderboards.

NuckleDu would later pick up Street Fighter V, notably taking 2nd at DreamHack Austin over Justin Wong. Alex Valle commented saying that players like NuckleDu need to have a superior neutral game in order to beat Wong.

He placed first in the Capcom Cup 2016 and won the prize of US$230,000.

NuckleDu left Team Liquid in December 2017.

On July 19, 2018, after going almost a year without a sponsor and jokingly giving himself the "sponsorship" tag "My Wallet" in tournaments, Ghost Gaming announced via a Tweet that they had signed on NuckleDu as their debut FGC player and that his first tournament underneath the sponsorship would be Defend the North 2018.

On January 1, 2019, NuckleDu announced on his Twitter that he was officially a free agent, then on February 13, 2019, he announced his signing to the team Echo Fox.

On July 6, 2020, NuckleDu announced on his Twitter his indefinite retirement after a devastating car crash left him injured.

On September 9, 2022, Capcom Fighters announced on Twitter that NuckleDu would return to the Street Fighter Pro League 2022.

NuckleDu joined Shopify Rebellion in August 2023.

== Playstyle ==
In Ultra Street Fighter IV, NuckleDu is known as a master of charge characters. His offensive playstyle with Guile is considered unorthodox and attracts viewers. While playing as Decapre, he is known for having a tricky yet unpredictable playstyle which adds to his character selection. NuckleDu is also known for his excessive taunting during matches in the form of Guile's shades, which players find offensive and have labelled him as a villain because of it.

In Street Fighter V, NuckleDu's Nash is considered offensive usually beginning with fast-paced movement later turning into a slugfest, a playstyle he is familiar with when playing as the character.

== Personal life ==
Dang was born on May 12, 1996, in Tampa, Florida. He has a pet dog named Tofu that he cares for and helps him avoid depression. NuckleDu is of Vietnamese ancestry, and his family is from there. In an interview with Chris Bahn of PVP Live, NuckleDu stated he has a fear of flying which is why he rarely travels outside of the United States, but desires to visit Australia and Vietnam.

In 2017, NuckleDu donated his DreamHack Montreal 2017 winnings to the Hurricane Irma relief, in which the hurricane affected his home state of Florida.

== Tournament results ==
Tournament Results

Year	Tournament	Placement	Game
2012	Street Fighter 25th Anniversary Tournament Qualifier: New York City	2nd	Street Fighter X Tekken
2012	Northeast Championships 13	2nd	Super Street Fighter IV: Arcade Edition v2012
2012	Street Fighter 25 Anniversary Tournament Grand Finals	13th	Street Fighter X Tekken
2013	Final Round 16	5th	Super Street Fighter IV: Arcade Edition v2012
2013	Civil War V	7th	Super Street Fighter IV: Arcade Edition v2012
2013	Civil War V	2nd	Street Fighter X Tekken v2013
2013	East Coast Throwdown V	2nd	Street Fighter X Tekken v2013
2013	Summer Jam VII	3rd	Super Street Fighter IV: Arcade Edition v2012
2013	Summer Jam VII	1st	Street Fighter X Tekken v2013
2013	The Fall Classic 2013	4th	Street Fighter X Tekken v2013
2013	Youmacon 2013	2nd	Super Street Fighter IV: Arcade Edition v2012
2013	Northeast Championships 14	7th	Super Street Fighter IV: Arcade Edition v2012
2013	Northeast Championships 14	2nd	Street Fighter X Tekken v2013
2013	Capcom Cup 2013	5th	Street Fighter X Tekken v2013
2014	Defend the North 2014	4th	Super Street Fighter IV: Arcade Edition v2012
2014	Apex 2014	5th	Super Street Fighter IV: Arcade Edition v2012
2014	SoCal Regionals 2014	5th	Super Street Fighter IV: Arcade Edition v2012
2014	SoCal Regionals 2014	2nd	Street Fighter X Tekken v2013
2014	NorCal Regionals 2014	1st	Street Fighter X Tekken v2013
2014	Ultimate Fighting Game Tournament 10	5th	Ultra Street Fighter IV
2014	First Attack 2014	2nd	Ultra Street Fighter IV
2014	Summer Jam 8	4th	Ultra Street Fighter IV
2014	Game Underground Tournament Spectacular 3	2nd	Ultra Street Fighter IV
2014	The Fall Classic 2014	4th	Ultra Street Fighter IV
2014	Capcom Cup 2014	9th	Ultra Street Fighter IV
2014	Hadocon VI	1st	Ultra Street Fighter IV
2015	Apex 2015	1st	Ultra Street Fighter IV
2015	NorCal Regionals 2015	3rd	Ultra Street Fighter IV
2015	Combo Breaker 2015	1st	Ultra Street Fighter IV
2015	Evolution 2015	7th	Ultra Street Fighter IV
2015	EGL Dallas 10K	1st	Ultra Street Fighter IV
2015	Absolute Battle 6	1st	Ultra Street Fighter IV
2015	Defend the North 2015	3rd	Ultra Street Fighter IV
2015	Capcom Cup 2015	13th	Ultra Street Fighter IV
2016	Kumite in Tennessee 2016	1st	Ultra Street Fighter IV
2016	Final Round 19	1st	Ultra Street Fighter IV
2016	NorCal Regionals 2016	5th	Street Fighter V
2016	NorCal Regionals 2016	3rd	Ultra Street Fighter IV
2016	PAX Arena Street Fighter 5 Invitational	1st	Street Fighter V
2016	DreamHack Austin	2nd	Street Fighter V
2016	Combo Breaker 2016	4th	Street Fighter V
2016	Combo Breaker 2016	1st	Ultra Street Fighter IV
2016	CEO 2016	5th	Street Fighter V
2016	SoCal Regionals 2016	5th	Street Fighter V
2016	Canada Cup 2016	1st	Street Fighter V
2016	CPT North America Regional Final	1st	Street Fighter V
2016	Capcom Cup 2016	1st	Street Fighter V
2017	Combo Breaker 2017	1st	Street Fighter V
