= Capcom Cup =

Annual esports tournament

- Game: Fighting games Ultra Street Fighter IV; Street Fighter V Street Fighter 6
- Founded: 2013
- Founder: Capcom
- Country: United States
- Most recent champion: "Kakeru"
- Qualification: Capcom Pro Tour
- Website: capcomcup.com

The Capcom Cup is an annual fighting game tournament specifically focused on the Street Fighter series. The event's first incarnation was in 2013 which featured Super Street Fighter IV: Arcade Edition version 2012, Ultimate Marvel vs. Capcom 3, and Street Fighter X Tekken version 2013 as the three main games each with 8 qualifiers. In 2014, Capcom Cup was an Ultra Street Fighter IV exclusive tournament with 16 qualifiers. The 2015 Capcom Cup was doubled to a 32-man format and was later increased to a 48-man format beginning with Capcom Cup IX in 2022–23. The series of qualifying events for the tournament are known as the Capcom Pro Tour and include many of the largest, most prestigious pre-existing fighting game tournaments such as Evolution Championship Series and DreamHack.

== History ==
=== 2010s ===
==== 2013 ====
In 2013, Capcom started the Capcom Cup right after EVO 2013, with Ho "Xian" Kun Xian receiving a special invitation. Capcom released qualifier dates to determine the seven remaining qualifiers. Capcom created a poll to decide which players would make it into the Ultimate Marvel vs. Capcom 3 tournament, with Nemo, Justin Wong, KaneBlueRiver, IFC Yipes, Abegen, NYChrisG, Filipino Champ, and MarlinPie being voted in. For their Street Fighter X Tekken tournament, Capcom also gave special invites to Infiltration, Justin Wong, Alex Valle, and NuckleDu. The other four players were determined by two respective PlayStation Network and Xbox Live tournaments.

Capcom Cup 2013 was hosted at the Hyatt Regency San Francisco Airport in Burlingame, California on December 14, 2013. There was some controversy regarding the EVO 2013 Ultimate Marvel vs. Capcom 3 champion Job "Flocker" Figueroa being cut from the player lineup. In response, Capcom set up a First-To-Five exhibition match between EVO Champ Flocker and the Capcom Cup 2013 champion. The victor of the Ultimate Marvel vs. Capcom 3 tournament, NYChrisG, faced off against Flocker and defeated him. There was also two exhibition matches for an early build of Ultra Street Fighter IV; the first being Eduardo "PR Balrog" Perez-Frangie against Alex Valle, and the second being Infiltration vs. Filipino Champ.

Capcom Cup 2013 tournament results

Super Street Fighter IV: Arcade Edition v2012
Place	Player	Alias	Character(s)	Qualification
1st	(Japan) Naoto Sako	HORI|Sako	Evil Ryu	Treta Aftermath
2nd	(Singapore) Kun Xian Ho	DM.MCZ|Xian	Gen	Special Invite for winning EVO 2013
3rd	(Japan) Keita Ai	RZR|Fuudo	Fei Long	Capcom Cup Asia Finals
4th	(Japan) Tatsuya Haitani	Haitani	Makoto	Tokyo Game Show 2013
5th	(Japan) Hajime Taniguchi	MCZ|Tokido	Akuma	Shadowloo Showdown 2013
5th	(Singapore) Ghim Kee Eng	DM.MCZ|Gackt	Fei Long	Capcom Cup Asia Finals
7th	(United States) Christopher Gonzalez	AGE|NYChrisG	Sakura	The Fall Classic 2013
7th	(France) Alioune Camara	BCN-esports|Alioune	Cammy	Play Expo 2013

Ultimate Marvel vs. Capcom 3
Place	Player	Alias	Character(s)
1st	(United States) Christopher Gonzalez	AGE|NYChrisG	Morrigan/Doctor Doom/Vergil
2nd	(United States) Michael Mendoza	EMP|IFC Yipes	Spencer/Vergil/Hawkeye, Dante/Vergil/Magneto, Wesker/Dante/Spencer
3rd	(United States) Ryan Ramirez	coL|Filipino Champ	Magneto/Doctor Doom/Phoenix, Magneto/Dormammu/Doctor Doom
4th	(Japan) Naoki Nemoto	BE|Nemo	Nova/Doctor Strange/Spencer
5th	(United States) Justin Wong	EG|Justin Wong	Wolverine/Storm/Akuma, Wolverine/Spencer/Frank West
5th	(Japan) Genki Abe	BE|Abegen	Tron/Thor/She-Hulk
7th	(United States) Kyohei Lehr	BT|MarlinPie	C. Viper/Doctor Doom/Amaterasu
7th	(Chile) Nicolás González	BE|KaneBlueRiver	Hulk/Haggar/Sentinel

Street Fighter X Tekken v2013
Place	Player	Alias	Character(s)	Qualification
1st	(South Korea) Seon-Woo Lee	Infiltration	Jin/Alisa	Special Invite
2nd	(United States) Dexter James	EMP|Tampa Bison	M. Bison/Rolento	Online Qualifier
3rd	(United States) Justin Wong	EG|Justin Wong	Hwoarang/Chun-Li	Special Invite
4th	(United States) Alex Valle	LU|Alex Valle	Yoshimitsu/Lars	Special Invite
5th	(United States) Du Dang	DSC.EMP|NuckleDu	Guile/Zangief	Special Invite
5th	(United States) Alexander Ramos	KS|Ramos	Vega/Cammy	Online Qualifier
7th	(United States) Garrett Palmer	THEZOMBIEDRIVER	Hwoarang/Nina	Online Qualifier
7th	(United States) Sareth Sok	KS.CORN|Sethlolol	Law/Kuma	Online Qualifier

==== 2014 ====
In 2014, Twitch and Capcom partnered up to create an Ultra Street Fighter IV circuit known as the Capcom Pro Tour. Ten players would automatically qualify into the tournament and the other six would garner points. The Capcom Pro Tour featured a point system divided into four tiers. Tier 3 consists of six Online Tournaments, which are the lowest-earning tournaments in the circuit. Tier 2 is for Ranking Tournaments, which are international tournaments that are mainly composed of players in a certain region. Tier 1 consists of nine Premier Tournaments. A player would automatically qualify upon winning the tournament or being the highest player who hasn't qualified. Evolution Tier consists of the Evolution Championship Series, which grants the player four times the points of a Premier Tournament and also gives the winner an automatic spot in the Capcom Cup. Capcom has removed Tier 3 (Online Tournaments) from the 2015 Capcom Pro Tour circuit.

Capcom Cup 2014 was the conclusion of the Capcom Pro Tour in 2014. Capcom Cup 2014 was held at The Warfield in San Francisco, California on December 13, 2014. One notable appearance in the Capcom Cup was a Brazilian player named Eric "ChuChu" Moreira Silva, who qualified by garnering the majority of his points from the online tournaments. Another notable moment was Momochi's dominant performance; taking a set off of Snake Eyez, losing a set to Ryan Hart, then completely dominated everyone in the tournament. There were also two exhibition matches for the Ultra Street Fighter IV Omega Mode, a mode which changes how every character plays. The main exhibition was Alex Valle vs. Ryan "Filipino Champ" Ramirez, and the secondary exhibition was Kelvin Jeon going up against Hooman "Hoodaman" Ghahremani. Capcom also showed the first ever match of their upcoming game Street Fighter V with Twitch's Mike Ross using Ryu going up against Capcom's Peter "Combofiend" Rosas using Chun-Li.

==== 2015 ====
Capcom Cup 2015 was announced by Yoshinori Ono at Capcom Cup 2014. The tournament will use the same ruleset as the previous year. Capcom Pro Tour 2015 has a total pot bonus of $500,000 thanks to a partnership between Sony Computer Entertainment and Capcom. The tournament has also been doubled from 16 qualifiers to 32. One of the spots was reserved for 2014's Capcom Cup champion, Yusuke Momochi. In May, Capcom announced a new rule for the Capcom Pro Tour Premier events, stating that if the Top 4 players in a Capcom Pro Tour premier event have all qualified, Capcom will remove the automatic qualifying spot and add a new qualifying slot to the CPT Leaderboards.

Capcom Cup 2015 was held December 6 at Moscone Center in San Francisco, California, coinciding with the PlayStation Experience conference.

==== 2016 ====
Capcom Cup 2016 is to be held in December 2016. 32 players will qualify for the tournament by winning one of the eleven Capcom Pro Tour Global Premier Events, Evo 2016, one of the four regional events, or by scoring high on the Points Leaderboards. Street Fighter V was released shortly before the start of the 2016 Capcom Pro Tour and has replaced Ultra Street Fighter IV during this season.

Capcom Cup 2016 was held on December 2 and 3 of that year. The top 32 to top 8 portion of the tournament was held on December 2 at the esports Arena in Santa Ana, California, while the top 8 portion was held on December 3 at that year's PlayStation Experience at the Anaheim Convention Center in Anaheim, California. The tournament was eventually won by NuckleDu, defeating Ricki Ortiz in the finale.

==== 2017 ====
Capcom moved away from auto-qualification spots in Capcom Pro Tour 2017. This was done to simplify the Pro Tour, as confusion arose around the Global and Regional Leaderboards throughout the 2016 season. Capcom's Neidel "Haunts" Crisan also noted in November 2016 that CPT 2017 may host fewer events than the 2016 season.

Saúl Antonio Mena "MenaRD" from the Dominican Republic, at only 17 years old, won the Capcom Cup 2017. He won 3-1 against Tokido from Japan. In his road to confront Tokido, he beat famous pro-players such as Daigo The Beast, Nemo, Itazan, and the previous Capcom Cup winner Xian.

==== 2018 ====
Capcom Cup 2018 was held in the Esports Arena in Las Vegas on December 14–16. The tournament began with a "Last Chance Qualifier" event, which filled the final spot of the 32-person Capcom Cup bracket. The tournament's first prize was set to $250,000 USD. Capcom Cup 2018 was won by Kanamori "Gachikun" Tsunehiro, defeating Hiromiki "Itabashi Zangief" Kumada in the grand finals. No. 1 seed and Evo 2017 champion Taniguchi "Tokido" Hajime dropped out early during the tournament, alongside various other high-seeded players.

==== 2019 ====
Capcom Cup 2019 was held at The Novo in Los Angeles, California, from December 13–15, 2019. Similar to the 2018 edition, the event began with a Last Chance Qualifier before going into the tournament proper. The tournament was won by Derek "iDom" Ruffin after defeating Victor "Punk" Woodley in the grand finals.

=== 2020s ===
==== COVID-19 suspension ====
The COVID-19 pandemic brought a suspension to all offline events for the Capcom Pro Tours of 2020 and 2021. All events during both seasons were held online and their respective Capcom Cups were cancelled and replaced by an online Season Final tournament in both seasons.

==== Capcom Cup IX (2022–23) ====
After over three years, the Capcom Cup made its return with Capcom Cup IX, the culmination of the Capcom Pro Tour 2022. The tournament took place at Avalon Hollywood in Los Angeles from February 14–19, 2023. The first prize for this tournament was decreased to $120,000. The tournament was won by Saul Leonardo "MenaRD" Mena II.

==== Capcom Cup X (2023–24) ====
The Capcom Cup X, much like IX, was held at Avalon Hollywood from February 21–25, 2024, as the culmination of the Capcom Pro Tour 2023. It was the first edition of Street Fighter 6 and featured a prize pool of over $2,000,000. It was preceded by the Last Chance Qualifier to fill in the final spot of the 48-person bracket. Capcom Cup X was won by Wang "UMA" Yuan-hao, who won the first prize of $1,000,000, the largest ever for a fighting game tournament.

==== Capcom Cup 11 (2024–25) ====
Capcom Cup 11 was held from March 5-8, 2025, and took place at the Ryōgoku Kokugikan in Tokyo, Japan. The first prize is set to remain at $1,000,000. The winner is Kakeru, a JP player from Japan.

==== Capcom Cup 12 (2025–26) ====
Capcom Cup 12 follows the same venue as Capcom Cup 11, and was held from March 11-14, 2026. The first prize is set to remain at $1,000,000. Sahara, an ED player from Japan, won Capcom Cup 12.
