= History of the Tokyo Game Show =

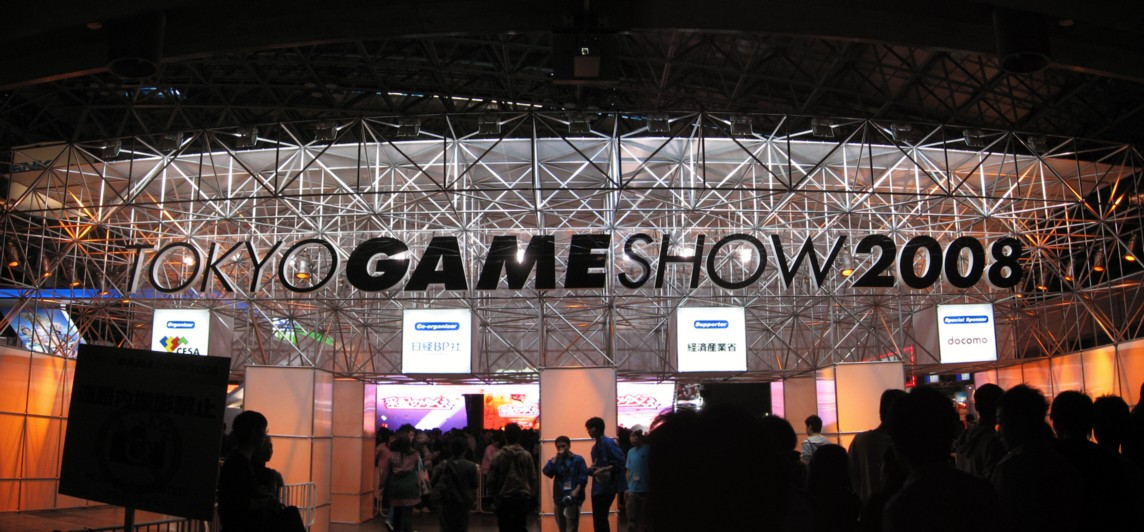
Entry gate of TGS 2008

The history of Tokyo Game Show began with its creation in 1996 and has continued through the latest expo in 2026. It has been held in Chiba, Japan, annually since 1996 by Computer Entertainment Supplier's Association (CESA) and the Nikkei Business Publications.

== History ==
=== 1996 (August 22–24) ===
The first Tokyo Game Show was held on August 22 to 24, 1996. The attendance was over 109,000, and the 87 participating companies displayed a total of 365 games. Originally, the show was held twice a year, once in the spring and once in the autumn (in the Tokyo Big Sight) starting in 1997, but this format was discontinued in 2002 when the show was held only in the autumn. Since then, the show is held once a year.

=== 1997 (April 4–6, September 5–7) ===
Tokyo Game Show 1997 was held April 4 to 6 in spring and September 5 to 7 in autumn. This was the first show to function with the spring/autumn format. Attendance at the spring show was over 120,000, and over 100,000 at the autumn show. Nintendo had no presence at the show, opting to support their own Shoshinkai show instead. High-profile software unveiled included Sonic Jam, Panzer Dragoon Saga, Ghost in the Shell, Resident Evil 2, and Tobal 2. A PaRappa the Rapper stage show drew massive crowds.

The spring exhibition's promotional character, featured on posters, flyers and admission tickets, was designed by Japanese actress and illustrator Yoshie Okuyama. She was also scheduled to participate as a presenter at the CESA Awards '96 and as a main guest at the AAA charity auction.

=== 1998 (March 20–22, October 9–11) ===
Tokyo Game Show 1998 was held March 20 to 22 in spring and October 9 to 11 in autumn. Though Nintendo had no presence as usual, it co-sponsored the spring show with Microsoft. The spring show was dominated by games that had already been demonstrated at previous shows; the only high-profile unveiling was the Capcom Generations series.

=== 1999 (March 19–21, September 17–19) ===
Tokyo Game Show 1999 was held March 19 to 21 in spring and September 17 to 19 in autumn. Sony showcased the PlayStation 2 and many games ahead of its release in March. Many PlayStation and PlayStation 2 games were presented, and playable demo's and booths were available for guests to play. This included many launch titles for the PlayStation 2, and projectors played movies of the games on stage such as Tekken Tag Tournament, Gran Turismo 2000, and Dark Cloud.

=== 2000 (March 31–April 2, September 22–24) ===
Tokyo Game Show 2000 was held March 31 to April 2 in spring and September 22 to 24 in autumn.

=== 2001 (March 30–April 1, October 12–14) ===
Tokyo Game Show 2001 was held March 30 to April 1 in spring and October 12 to 14 in autumn. This was the last show to function with the spring/autumn format.

=== 2002 (September 20–22) ===
Tokyo Game Show 2002 was held September 20 to 22 in autumn. This was the first show to abandon the spring/autumn format and started only being held once a year within autumn.

=== 2003 (September 26–27) ===
Tokyo Game Show 2003 was held September 26 to 27.

=== 2004 (September 24–26) ===
Tokyo Game Show 2004 was held on September 24 to 26, 2004. It featured 117 exhibitors showing off more than 500 computer and video game-related products to the 160,000 visitors.

=== 2005 (September 16–18) ===
Tokyo Game Show 2005 was held from September 16 to 18 in 2005. Microsoft held its own press event on 15 September 2005, one day before the opening of Tokyo Game Show. The show was opened with two keynote speeches on September 16. The first was given by Robert J. Bach, senior Vice President for the Home and Entertainment Division and chief Xbox officer at Microsoft. While traditionally Nintendo does not participate in Tokyo Game Show, its president, Satoru Iwata held a keynote speech there in 2005, where he revealed the controller for Nintendo's next generation video game console Wii, then known as the Revolution. There were hints by Ken Kutaragi that the PlayStation 3 would be playable at Tokyo Game Show, but this was not the case. Metal Gear Solid 4: Guns of the Patriots was shown publicly for the first time in trailer form. The MGS4 demo was also demonstrated by Hideo Kojima on the Konami stage, running in real time on a PS3 devkit.

=== 2006 (September 22–24) ===
Tokyo Game Show 2006 was held September 22 to 24.

=== 2007 (September 20–23) ===
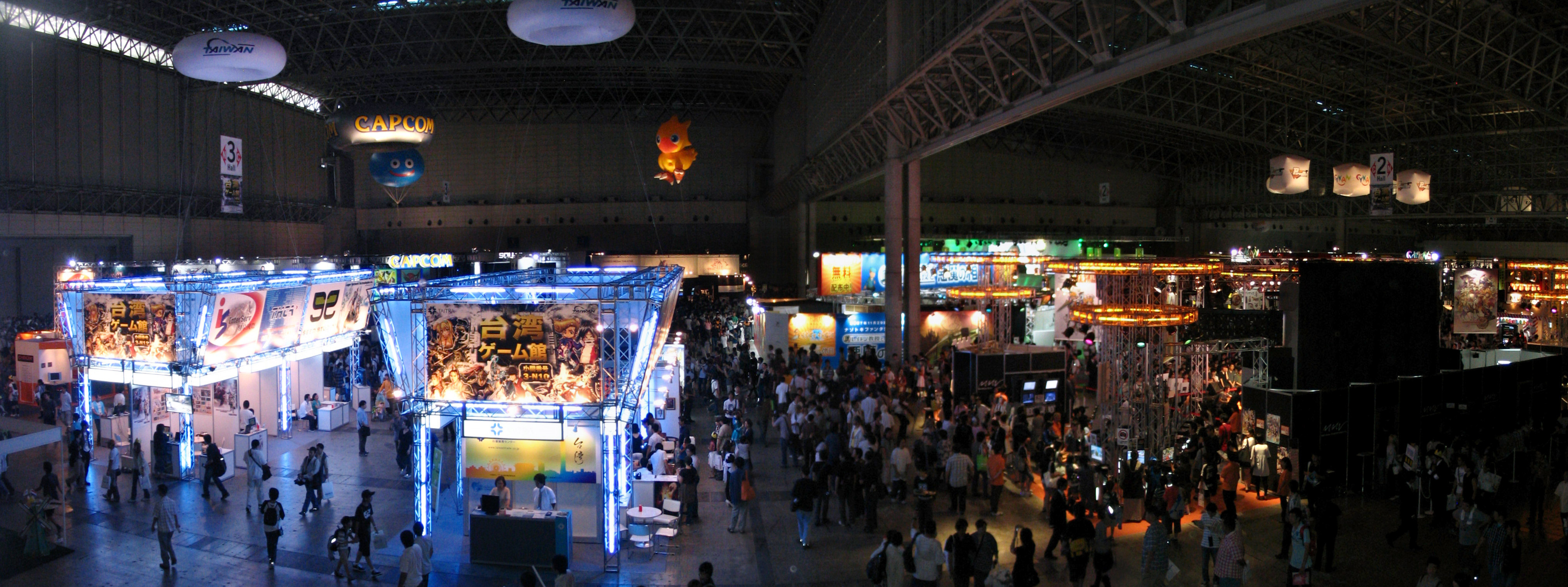
2007 showfloors 1-3 panorama

Tokyo Game Show 2007 was held on September 20 to 23. During TGS 2007, three Kingdom Hearts games; Birth by Sleep (PSP), 358/2 Days (DS) and coded (Mobile) were revealed by Square Enix. Sony announced the PSP game Secret Agent Clank and the rumble PS3 controller by the name "DualShock 3", which was released in Japan in November 2007, and in North America and Europe in spring 2008. With the announcement of a PlayStation Store service launched for PlayStation Portable in Japan, PlayStation Home was delayed until the spring of 2008. Also, Microsoft announced Ninja Gaiden II would be released exclusively for the Xbox 360.

=== 2008 (October 9–12) ===
Tokyo Game Show 2008 was held from October 9 to 12. Days 1 and 2 were open only to the press while days 3 and 4 were open to the general public. The CESA reports the total visitors for TGS 2008 exceeded 195,000, breaking all attendance records of the time. The most popular game shown was Ace Attorney Investigations: Miles Edgeworth.

=== 2009 (September 24–27) ===
Tokyo Game Show 2009 was held from September 24 to 27, following the same business and public days format as the last 2 years. According to Nikkei, 185,030 people came to the 2009 show.

=== 2010 (September 26–29) ===
Tokyo Game Show 2010 was held September 26 to 29, continuing with the same format with the show and included new features like the "Family games" and "Gadgets" areas. The 2010 show had 207,647 visitors in total.

=== 2011 (September 16–18) ===
Tokyo Game Show 2011 was held September 16 to 18. It had become overshadowed in Europe and North America by the Los Angeles-based Electronic Entertainment Expo, and there have been few revelations strong enough to compete with other video game conventions. TGS 2011 attendance was 222,668.

=== 2012 (September 20–23) ===
Tokyo Game Show 2012 was held from September 20 to 23 and saw a slight increase to 223,753 attendees.

=== 2013 (September 19–22) ===
Tokyo Game Show 2013 was held from September 19 to 22. As the new generation of gaming anchored its fresh wave of hardware, software, and accessories into the market, Sony and Microsoft appeared to demonstrate new products to consumers and media. Nintendo did not attend the show, though third parties did show their own 3DS and Wii U software. TGS attendance increased nearly every year that the show had been in its modern format, including 2013, when it reached a record-high 270,197 total attendees.

=== 2014 (September 18–21) ===
Tokyo Game Show 2014 was held from September 18 to 21. TGS 2014 marked the first time of the modern era that attendance did not increase over the previous year. Still, the 2014 show brought in 251,832 visitors, the second highest total in its history.

=== 2015 (September 17–20) ===
Tokyo Game Show 2015 was held from September 17 to 20.

=== 2016 (September 15–18) ===
Tokyo Game Show 2016 was held from September 15 to 18.

=== 2017 (September 21–24) ===
Tokyo Game Show 2017 was held from September 21 to 24.

=== 2018 (September 20–23) ===
Tokyo Game Show 2018 was held from September 20 to 23. This year saw a record attendance of 298,690 people.

=== 2019 (September 12–15) ===
Tokyo Game Show 2019 was held from September 12 to 15.

=== 2020 Online (September 24–27) ===
Tokyo Game Show 2020 was held from September 24 to 27, but due to the COVID-19 pandemic, the physical event was canceled. The organizers instead opted to host online events in replacement, known as Tokyo Game Show 2020 Online.

=== 2021 Online (September 30–October 3) ===
Tokyo Game Show 2021 was held from September 30 to October 3. It was originally planned to return to its physical format, but later was announced that the event would be switched to a virtual online format.

=== 2022 (September 15–18) ===
Tokyo Game Show 2022 was held from September 15 to 18. The show was a combined physical and virtual event.

=== 2023 (September 21–24) ===
Tokyo Game Show 2023 was held from September 21 to 24.

=== 2024 (September 26–29) ===
Tokyo Game Show 2024 was held from September 26 to 29.

=== 2025 (September 25–28) ===
Tokyo Game Show 2025 was held from September 25 to 28. This year saw an attendance of 263,101 people.

=== 2026 (September 17–20) ===
Tokyo Game Show 2026

Tokyo Game Show 2026 was held from September 17 to 20. The event's planned last day on September 21 was cancelled and it concluded a day earlier due to weather issues concerning the tropical storm Dujuan.
