= R. Mika =

Street Fighter character

- Street Fighter character
- R. Mika in Street Fighter Alpha 3 (1998)
- First game: Street Fighter Alpha 3 (1998)
- Created by: Akira "Akiman" Yasuda
- Designed by: Akira "Akiman" Yasuda; Daigo Ikeno; Toshiyuki Kamei (SFV)
- Voiced by: List: Bonnie Gordon (Street Fighter V, English); Junko Takeuchi (Street Fighter Alpha 3, Japanese); Hiromi Igarashi (Street Fighter V, Japanese)

In-universe information
- Fighting style: Professional wrestling
- Origin: Japan
- Nationality: Japanese

Rainbow Mika (レインボー ミカ), also known as R. Mika or Mika Nanakawa (七川 美華), is a character in Capcom's Street Fighter fighting game series. First appearing in Street Fighter Alpha 3 (1998) as a professional wrestler trying to make a name for herself, Mika was designed by Akira "Akiman" Yasuda with the help of artist Daigo Ikeno. She has since appeared in comics related to the Street Fighter franchise and other titles by Capcom. Mika returned in Street Fighter V (2016) with a redesigned appearance by Toshiyuki Kamei, now a mainline wrestler with a tag team partner named Yamato Nadeshiko. Originally voiced by Junko Takeuchi, as of Street Fighter V she was voiced by Bonnie Gordon and Hiromi Igarashi in English and Japanese.

R. Mika has received a mixed response, with a significant focus on her appearance and discussions on sexualization. While several outlets were critical of her design, others noted it was suitable for her wrestling character, and in particular The Mary Sue used her in a discussion contrasting sexualized versus empowered in regards to the differences between her game and comic counterparts. R. Mika was also the source of controversy when one of her attacks in Street Fighter V was seemingly censored.

== Conception and design ==
Designed by Akira "Akiman" Yasuda for Street Fighter Alpha 3, the character's design was originally very different according to producer Norikata Funamizu, with the core concept being to implement a "tricky and technical character" to enhance the gameplay. After another developer suggested to add a female professional wrestler to the game's roster, Akiman took the suggestion to heart and quickly drew a basic sketch, drawing some inspiration from an article he read in Gamest about Japanese professional wrestler Cutie Suzuki. His initial rough draft was significantly different, lacking the heart theme and mask while giving her a spikey hairstyle inspired by the manga Kimagure Orange Road, later switching to pigtails instead on the second draft. Artist Daigo Ikeno later helped fill in the details, giving what Akiman calls "a sense of realism" to her design. A particular goal of her gameplay was also to present a subtle difference between her and fellow Street Fighter character Zangief, in both positive and negative regards.

R. Mika stands 168 centimetres (5 ft 6 in) and has measurements of 97-72-93 cm (38-28-37 in). In Street Fighter Alpha 3 her outfit consists of a blue and white leotard extending down her thighs and arms, while her long blonde hair is in pigtails on the sides of her head. The leotard itself has various cutouts exposing her skin, namely on the shoulders, cleavage, thighs, buttocks, and a heart cutout on her upper back intended to bring attention to her backside. A white bustier covers her breasts, with a large blue heart on each of her nipples, an aspect inspired the character Michiru Saotome from Getter Robo. White frills circle her neck, wrists, and sides of her pelvis, while white laced wrestling boots extend up to her knees. A blue rounded domino mask covers her eyes, a feature inspired by anime character Yatterman-2 in an attempt to capture what Akiman felt made that character cute. In the book How to Make Capcom Fighting Characters, Akiman added that her blonde hair/blue/white color scheme combination was also inspired by another character, in this case Lisa Kusanami from Sega's fighting game Last Bronx.

Years later, Street Fighter IV producer Yoshinori Ono heavily petitioned the game's director for her inclusion in the title, citing her as his personal favorite character, with no success. However, she was later included in Street Fighter V, with art director Toshiyuki Kamei focused on updating her outfit with a bolder design, and adding flair to signify her character transition to a headline act in professional wrestling. Describing her in a design note as a "peppy girl with some meat on her bones and a classic pro-wrestling style", they emphasized her "girlishness" and "cuteness" in contrast to the other series wrestlers, and wanted to show her bouncing around the arena as she fought. In this incarnation more skin is exposed, while her chest is now covered in white material with a heart shaped cutout extending around the top of her breasts. Akiman on his Twitter voiced approval for the change, stating that she was easier to see thanks to the removal of the hearts from her chest, adding in a later tweet they made her look "overdone" and describing the cutout as "very neat! The juniors at Capcom are very proper!" In addition to the changes, Mika was also given a wide variety of secondary outfits, including a version of her regular attire that exposes less skin with a white stylized "M" on her chest, a schoolgirl outfit with glasses, and a red ornate outfit modeled after a phoenix.

With Street Fighter V another character named Yamato Nadeshiko (大和 ナデシコ) was designed to appear in several of her attacks, and alongside her in-game. An athletic Japanese woman wearing red and white wrestling boots and leotard with a bob style haircut, she was designed by Ikeno during Street Fighter Alpha 3's development as Mika's tag team partner, and appeared on the cover of Capcom's "Secret File" arcade flyer for the game. When implemented into V, game director Takayuki Nakayama sent an image of Japanese professional wrestler Hikaru Shida to the character designer to use as a guide.

== Appearances ==
As introduced in the 1998 video game Street Fighter Alpha 3, Mika Nanakawa is a Japanese woman seeking to make her debut in professional wrestling under the stage name "Rainbow Mika", inspired by her idolization of Zangief. To promote herself, she decides to travel the world and fight various martial artists. She encounters Zangief himself along the way, and after the two spar they are attacked by the criminal organization Shadloo and its leader M. Bison. The wrestlers manage to escape and go their separate ways, with Mika pondering if she'll see Zangief again while she trains. In Street Fighter V, a game set after the events of her first appearance, Mika is now a full professional wrestler and works with her former tag team partner Yamato Nadeshiko. After encountering Zangief, she travels with him for some time, and after fighting off a rampaging bear together, he praises her spirit and agrees to be her wrestling partner. Later in the story, they work together alongside other Street Fighter characters to stop a revived Shadaloo.

Outside of the Street Fighter series she appears as a supporting character in the 2001 PlayStation game Startling Adventures: Kuusou Daibouken X 3's third chapter, where the protagonist helps her during a wrestling match by preventing attackers from entering the ring. She is also an available character Capcom's mobile game Street Fighter Battle Combination. The SNK vs. Capcom: Card Fighters series feature her as selectable cards, as does GungHo Online Entertainment's mobile game TEPPEN. In physical trading card media she appears in Versus TCG, a card game based on Card Fighters' Clash, and Jasco Games' Universal Fighting System. Lastly, her outfit appears as an alternative costume for Tekken character Kuma in the crossover fighting game Street Fighter X Tekken.

In print media, Mika is featured frequently in UDON Entertainment's Street Fighter comic series. First introduced in Street Fighter Legends: Sakura, the character Sakura Kasugano is a fan of Mika, and attends a wrestling match between her and Zangief. After Mika defeats Zangief and knocks him unconscious, he later wakes up enraged and demands a rematch while she is attending fans. Mika fights him, and with Sakura's help they subdue him. In the fifth issue of Street Fighter II: Turbo, a retelling of the game, Mika and Zangief appear alongside other fighters invited to the fighting tournament and are told to tag team against the duo of E. Honda and Sodom in the preliminaries. While playing to the crowd, she is taken by surprise when Sodom charges at her but manages to suplex him, only to be thrown from the ring and eliminated from the tournament due to his quick recovery. In the first volume Super Street Fighter, a collection of short stories, she appears as part of a wrestling committee alongside other wrestling-themed characters from the series, the group ultimately breaking into a brawl. In the second, after appearing briefly in Dan Hibiki's story and defeating him, she is featured in her own in a match against the wrestler Hugo Andore. Hugo, however, refuses to fight due to finding her "too pretty", and his manager Poison takes his place instead. Poison handcuffs Mika during the match, but is defeated when Mika instead somersaults buttocks-first into her midsection, knocking Poison unconscious.

== Reception ==
Since her introduction Rainbow Mika has been met with mixed reception. Complex stated "Street Fighter has never been shy with the gorgeous ladies, but they've always had full-figured back stories to go along with their full-figured backsides. Rainbow Mika on the other hand is the most blatant example of mysogynistic [sic] character design seen in the series." Todd Ciolek from Anime News Network declared Mika as "the worst Street Fighter character," reasoning "every little detail about her annoyed me, from the stupid boob-hearts on her costume to the way she whomped opponents with her butt—and rubbed it after she hit the ground." At Paste, Eric Van Allen criticized her outfit by stating that "even by Street Fighter standards, this amount of gratuitous flesh is rather ridiculous." At Den of Geek, Gavin Jasper stated that while each of the wrestling characters represented a different aspect of the sport, she represented the pageantry, praising her character for it but adding "While seeing her bust out Stone Cold Stunners is good fun, the way they’ve transformed her into a sexualized rodeo clown does get kind of embarrassing at times."

However, this opinion is not shared between all critics, with GamesRadar noting her "ridiculously impractical attire" and propensity to attack with her buttocks as "all for her fans, and the Japanese wrestler's moxie comes through in her boisterous, crowd-pleasing personality." Nadia Oxford of USgamer found Mika to be an example of positive female gender representation, writing "I can say that I have nothing against, er, voluptuous women in games. Or even scantily-clad women", and that "My problem has always been women characters whom I'm expected to take seriously while they slay dragons/wander the desert/travel the frozen wastes while baring their midriff through the majority of their journey", and that she enjoys Mika's "silly" and "goofy" design. And despite his earlier criticism, in a later Paste article Eric Van Allen instead praised the character, calling her style "effective" and added "R. Mika throws caution to the wind and just goes for it, making her a fun character to play and a riveting one to watch."

In a series of articles examining characters from the Street Fighter series, Becky Chambers and Amanda LaPergola of The Mary Sue offered contrasting points on whether the character was sexist or not in their eyes in regards to her handling in different mediums. They noted her outfit as "ridiculously sexist", but moreso criticized her personality in the Street Fighter Alpha games, calling it "ditzy and dumb" and furthermore "irredeemably so." However, LaPergola cited her appearance in UDON's comic series, stating that while she continued to use the same out, "she is also treated as a top-notch wrestler with talent and fans that admire her for her skill in the ring. She’s not referred to as a bimbo or a sex object, just a really kick-ass fighter." She further added that an "important part of what makes a character portrayal sexist or not, is how they are treated by other characters. In this comic book, Mika is not a sexist character. Nobody treats her as one, and therefore she is not one."

Maddy Myers, in her own article for The Mary Sue, stated that while Mika's outfit represented "campy, posed sexuality" that often alienated players, she felt Mika as a character was more interesting than other sexualized characters in the series. Comparing her particularly to fellow Street Fighter character Cammy, she pointed out that the lack of seriousness in Mika's portrayal helped her be seen as a "tongue-in-cheek goofball, albeit a sexy goofball". Mentioning that while fans of the character may focus on the visual appeal, "she’s not exactly a straightforward sex kitten, either", and projected an "unabashed femininity" that Myers found amazing and uncommon in fighting games. While she acknowledged it was often played for laughs, she enjoyed that the joke regarding Mika's femininity was not one played on the character herself, and hoped that would remain the case.

=== Controversy ===
R. Mika slapping her buttocks. This was not shown in the North American version of the game, causing controversy

In debut footage of Street Fighter V, Mika is seen slapping her buttocks as part of her Critical Art attack. The decision not to show the animation in the North American version of the game was a subject of controversy, leading to a petition to restore it. According to producer Yoshinori Ono regarding not showing her butt slap, "Those changes came up internally. We decided to remove that because we want the biggest possible number of people to play, and we don’t want to have something in the game that might make someone uncomfortable." Some other shots, including the entrance animation for Cammy, were also replaced.

Jonathan Holmes from Destructoid questioned the controversy over the decision by stating "While there are surely plenty of folks who adore seeing their screen filled with frilly thong shots, I imagine there may be even more players out there who'd find the sudden prioritization of arse in their fighting games to be little out of place." Chris Carter at Destructoid commented "It's still a bit weird that something this goofy was removed, especially with the design Laura has in general," and noted that a character like Necalli is "probably far more harmful" for children's eyes. In another article by Destructoid, Carter stated "It's such a weird thing to me, because R. Mika's butt is still very visible, she just doesn't lightly tap it a few times per match." Likewise, ND Medina at iDigitalTimes expressed confusion over the change, noting that her buttocks were still being exposed. Her butt slap was later restored as a mod for the PC version, albeit in a different pose.
