= Capcom Pro Tour =

Series of international fighting game tournaments

- Sport: Fighting games
- Commissioner: Capcom; Matt "Matt Deezie" Dahlgren
- Countries: China, United States, France, Japan, South Korea, Vietnam, United Arab Emirates, Thailand, Spain, Dominican Republic, Brazil, United Kingdom
- Most recent champion: Tsunehiro "Gachikun" Kanamori
- Qualification: Open
- Website: https://capcomprotour.com

The Capcom Pro Tour is a series of international fighting game tournaments sponsored by video game developer Capcom. The Pro Tour culminates in the annual Capcom Cup, a single-day tournament held in the San Francisco Bay Area.

== 2014 ==
=== Capcom Cup 2014 Qualifiers ===
Country	Number of players	Players
United States	5	Snake Eyez, EG|Justin Wong, CRS|NuckleDu, EG|Ricky Ortiz, EG|PR Balrog
Japan	5	MCZ|Daigo Umehara, NISHIKIN, RZR|Fuudo, EG|Momochi, Bonchan
France	2	MD|Luffy, GL|Valmaster
United Kingdom	1	DIG|Ryan Hart
Singapore	1	RZR|Xian
South Korea	1	Infiltration
Brazil	1	CNB|ChuChu

== 2015 ==
=== Capcom Cup 2015 qualifiers ===
Country	Number of players	Players
Japan	13	EG|Momochi, MCZ|Mago, MCZ|Daigo Umehara, Kazunoko, MCZ|Tokido, YBK|Dashio, RZR|[[Fuudo]], RB|Bonchan, Nemo, Itabashi Zangief, MF|Tonpy, YBK|Shiro, /r/kappa|Misse
United States	5	RB|Snake Eyez, EG|Justin Wong, Liquid|NuckleDu, WFX|801 Strider, YOMI|Dieminion
China	3	Qanba.Douyu|Xiaohai, Dark Jiewa, Qanba.Douyu|Dakou
South Korea	2	RZR|Infiltration, /r/kappa|Poongko
Singapore	2	RZR|Xian, RZR|Gackt
Taiwan	2	AVM|GamerBee, RZR|RB
France	2	MD|Luffy, YP|Valmaster
United Kingdom	1	KIG|Problem X
Brazil	1	FGCBR|Keoma
Hong Kong	1	CCG|HumanBomb

== 2016 ==
Like the previous year, Capcom Pro Tour 2016 has a US$500,000 prize pool. Street Fighter V replaced Ultra Street Fighter IV as the game played during the series. Final Round 19 was the first major tournament in the circuit. Capcom plans to make the Capcom Cup itself much more balanced nationality-wise. The organizers also stated that only first-place finishers of each twelve premier events and regional finals can qualify, meaning that if someone who is already qualified takes first place, another global points qualifier will be added. Eight players will qualify from regional point leaderboards (two from North America, Europe, Asia, and Latin America each).

=== Capcom Cup 2016 qualifiers ===
Country	Number of players	Players
Japan	12	Tokido, Mago, BST|Daigo Umehara, EG|Momochi, RZR|Fuudo, MOV, YD.MJS|Haitani, HM|Eita, HM|Go1, GGP|Kazunoko, HORI|Sako, YD|Yukadon
United States	8	Liquid|NuckleDu, EG|Justin Wong, FOX|Julio Fuentes, PG|Filipino Champ, DNL|Chris Tatarian, EG|Ricki Ortiz, WFX|XSK Samurai, EG|K-Brad
France	2	RB|Luffy, MD|Mister Crimson
United Kingdom	2	PxP|Problem X, Ryan Hart
Brazil	1	F3|Brolynho
China	1	Qanba|Xiao Hai
Dominican Republic	1	GAM|DR Ray
Hong Kong	1	HuomaoTV|HumanBomb
Norway	1	BX3|Phenom
Singapore	1	RZR|Xian
South Korea	1	RZR|Infiltration
Taiwan	1	ZW|GamerBee

== 2017 ==
The 2017 Capcom Pro Tour took off on February 17, 2017. The points leaderboards and qualification mechanics for the 2017 Capcom Cup were greatly streamlined in the 2017 season, with automatic qualification upon winning a Premier Event being taken away. This Capcom Pro Tour still features Regional Finals, but the Regional points leaderboard is otherwise unused. This Pro Tour features more online events than the 2016 event did. The finals were won by MenaRD, using Birdie.

== 2018 ==
In total, 465 players scored points in the season. The finals were won by Gachikun, using Rashid.

== 2019 ==
In total, 508 players scored points in the season. Idom won using Poison.

== 2020 ==
Live events in 2020 were cancelled due to the COVID-19 pandemic.

The Evo weekend was replaced with an online-only tournament. Street Fighter V was not selected for this event.

At the first official online event, two leading competitors, including Idom, dropped out live on air, citing the poor netcode of Street Fighter V.

In August 2020, top player Punk was penalised by Capcom for a public outburst against the poor netcode.
