= Infiltration (gamer) =

South Korean gamer (born 1984/1985)

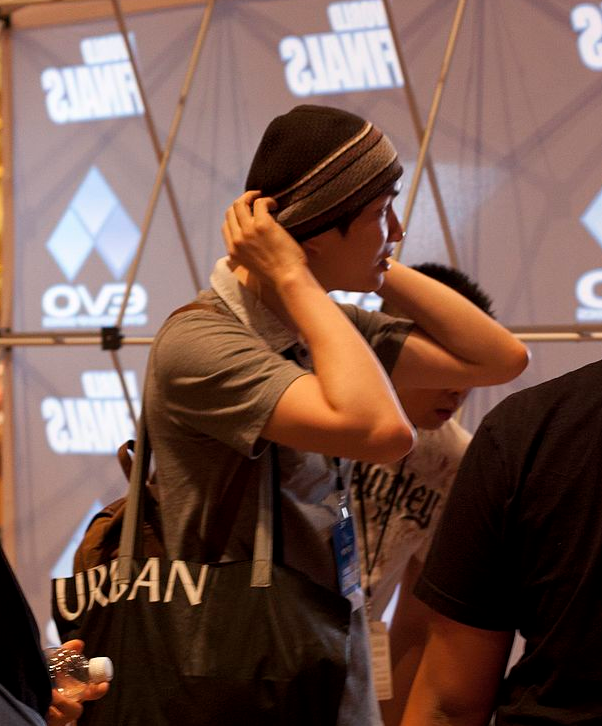
- Infiltration at Evo 2012

Personal information
- Name: Seonwoo Lee
- Born: 1984 or 1985 (age 41–42)
- Nationality: Korean

Current team
- Team: Unsigned
- Game: Street Fighter series

Team history
- 2012–2013: Western Wolves
- 2012–2013: Mad Catz
- 2015–2017: Team Razer
- 2017–2018: Team Grapht
- 2017–2018: Panda Global
- 2020–2021: Afreeca Freecs

Korean name
- Hangul: 이선우
- RR: I Seonu
- MR: I Sŏnu

Lee Seon-woo (Korean: 이선우), known as Infiltration, is a professional esports player from Seoul, South Korea, specializing in fighting games. Lee is a six-time Evolution Championship Series (EVO) champion; winning Super Street Fighter IV Arcade Edition v2012 in 2012, Street Fighter X Tekken in 2012 and 2013, Street Fighter V in 2016 and 2018 (EVO Japan) and Samurai Shodown in 2019.

Lee was fired from his team, Panda Global, in November 2018 after the organization learned of a domestic abuse case he was convicted for the year before.

== Gaming career ==
Infiltration first started playing fighting games seriously with the home release of Street Fighter IV, but he offered tips for players hoping to raise their skill level. The "Infiltration" name comes from the Metal Gear Solid series, of which he is a big fan. Lee uses a bat-top joystick due to the first FightStick he bought was coincidentally a bat-top joystick sold for 2,000 yen ($20 US). Lee chose Akuma in Street Fighter IV because he heard that Akuma was strong in the game at the time. Lee's main focus is physical training instead of in-game practice.

Lee is the winner of the Street Fighter 25th Anniversary Grand Finals for both Super Street Fighter IV: Arcade Edition v2012 and Street Fighter X Tekken and won $25,000 for each game. The former event saw Lee win against Mad Catz's Daigo Umehara 6–0. Because he won the latter, Lee also received a one of a kind Street Fighter-based Scion FR-S Coupe. Lee also won the Capcom Cup 2013 Street Fighter X Tekken tournament in which he was invited to by Capcom. In March, Lee qualified for the Capcom Pro Tour Asia Finals by winning Nine States Tournament 2015. In late May, Lee qualified for Capcom Cup 2015 by placing Top 3 at Stunfest 2015. Lee's opponents in Top 3, Momochi and Umehara have already qualified thus giving Lee the qualifying spot by default.

Lee is known for having a defensive playstyle as determined by Justin Wong's Step Up Your Game series. On January 16, 2015, Eventhubs ranked Lee at #6 on their Top 50 Ultra Street Fighter IV players list. Lee is also known for creating an outstanding comeback against Eduardo "PR Balrog" Perez in the Losers Semis at EVO 2013 Super Street Fighter IV: Arcade Edition v2012, where he counterpicked Perez's Balrog with Hakan. Lee qualified for the 2014 Capcom Cup by winning CEO 2014 in an exciting battle against Evil Geniuses' Yusuke Momochi. Momochi would later defeat Lee at Capcom Cup 2014 resulting in the latter to get a 4th-place finish.

Because of his performances in 2012, Lee has been called "Player of the Year" by many including Capcom. However, in late 2013, Lee saw a small decline where other players managed to catch up to his level. Overall, Lee still manages to perform well in tournaments he enters, usually making Top 4.

A controversy regarding 2015's Capcom Pro Tour circuit came up regarding Lee, with some labeling him as a "gatekeeper" due to visiting multiple CPT events despite already qualifying for Capcom Cup (here 'gatekeeping' means to keep other players from qualifying). Lee stated in an interview that his intention was not to gatekeep, but instead to practice before the Capcom Cup begins in December. Lee also states that Street Fighter V is going in a good direction, as he thinks that making the game offense-oriented will make it faster and better.

On November 15, 2015, Infiltration signed with Team Razer.

On June 4, 2022, Capcom Fighters announced via a tweet that Infiltration (as well as Michael "Theo Lee Ronin" Parks) "will be banned from all Capcom-owned, operated and/or licensed events globally, including Capcom Pro Tour and Street Fighter League, until further notice."

== Personal life ==
In mid-2014, Lee had to sell the one-of-a-kind Scion FR-S Coupe he won because of high maintenance issues. This was also the same car Lee actually had to earn his drivers license for, just so he could drive it.

On October 22, 2017, Lee got into an argument with his then-wife. The police responded to a call and documented evidence of broken household objects. Lee was arrested and charged with domestic violence. Paramedics took her to a hospital and documented a wrist injury and bruises. A South Korean court ruled against Lee on November 30, 2017. Lee and his wife divorced in December 2017. Panda Global, Lee's sponsoring team, learned about the assault in September 2018 and withdrew Lee from all upcoming tournaments at the time. He was fired from the team on November 22, 2018, after Panda Global obtained his court records.

== Notable tournament placings ==
Super Street Fighter IV results

Year	Tournament	Placement
2010	Electronic Sports World Cup	4th
2010	Evolution 2010	3rd

Super Street Fighter IV: Arcade Edition tournament results

Year	Tournament	Placement
2011	ReveLAtions	5th
2011	Canada Cup	5th
2011	NorCal Regionals	2nd
2011	Capcom Korea Cup	2nd
2011	Evolution 2011	25th
2011	Season's Beatings Velocity	9th
2011	DreamHack Winter 2011	1st

Super Street Fighter IV: Arcade Edition v2012 tournament results

Year	Tournament	Placement
2012	NorCal Regionals 10	2nd
2012	Season's Beatings: Summer Slam	1st
2012	DreamHack Summer 2012	1st
2012	Evolution 2012	1st
2012	Season's Beatings Ascension	2nd
2012	Canada Cup 2012	5th
2012	DreamHack Winter 2012	1st
2012	Street Fighter 25th Anniversary Grand Finals	1st
2013	SoCal Regionals 2013	1st
2013	Final Round 16	1st
2013	NorCal Regionals 11	1st
2013	DreamHack Summer 2013	2nd
2013	Evolution 2013	3rd
2013	World Cyber Games 2013 Korea National Final	1st
2013	Capcom Cup Asia 2013 Korea Qualifier	1st
2013	ThaigerUppercut Championship 2013	3rd
2014	SoCal Regionals 2014	2nd
2014	Final Round XVII	3rd
2014	NorCal Regionals 2014	2nd

Street Fighter X Tekken tournament results

Year	Tournament	Placement
2012	NorCal Regionals 10	1st
2012	Canada Cup 2012	1st
2012	Street Fighter 25th Anniversary Grand Finals	1st
2013	SoCal Regionals 2013	1st
2013	Final Round 16	2nd
2013	NorCal Regionals 11	1st
2013	Evolution 2013	1st
2013	Canada Cup 2013	2nd
2013	Capcom Cup 2013	1st
2014	SoCal Regionals 2014	1st
2014	Final Round XVII	3rd

Ultra Street Fighter IV tournament results

Year	Tournament	Placement
2014	SoCal Regionals 2014	3rd
2014	Capcom Pro Tour Invitation Tournament @ E3	1st
2014	DreamHack Summer 2014	1st
2014	CEO - Community Effort Orlando 2014	1st
2014	IeSF 6th e-Sports World Championships	1st
2014	Capcom Cup 2014	4th
2015	Sonic Boom 2015	1st
2015	Cannes Winter Clash 2015	3rd
2015	Nine States Tournament 2015	1st
2015	Final Round 18	17th
2015	Red Bull Kumite	4th
2015	NorCal Regionals 2015	7th
2015	Double Elimination 2015	1st
2015	Texas Showdown 2015	1st
2015	Toryuken 2015	1st
2015	Stunfest 2015	3rd
2015	Evolution 2015	3rd
2015	HK eSports Tournament 2015	1st
2015	First Attack 2015	1st
2015	Tokyo Game Show 2015	3rd

Street Fighter V results

Year	Tournament	Placement
2016	Final Round	1st
2016	NorCal Regionals	1st
2016	Red Bull Kumite	1st
2016	Community Effort Orlando	2nd
2016	Evolution 2016	1st
2017	Red Bull Kumite	5th
2017	Manila Cup 2017	1st
2018	EVO Japan 2018	1st
2018	Final Round 2018	1st

Samurai Shodown results

Year	Tournament	Placement
2019	EVO 2019	1st
