= Capcom Pro Tour 2017 =

Esports competition

The 2017 Capcom Pro Tour was the fourth edition of the Capcom Pro Tour, an annual season of Street Fighter V tournaments that are officially sponsored by Capcom. The 2017 Capcom Pro Tour followed several months after the "Season 2" update of Street Fighter V and started off with Final Round 20 on March 10. Much like the 2016 season, this season featured fifteen Premier Events, a few dozen smaller tournaments, several online tournaments, and the Evolution Championship. In these tournaments, competitors gained points needed to qualify for the 2017 Capcom Cup, which was held in December.

== Background ==
Shortly after Capcom Cup 2016 was played, Capcom rolled out a major update for Street Fighter V titled "Season 2". Various characters were buffed or nerfed in the update: R. Mika and Chun Li were made weaker in the update, while Dhalsim got numerous buffs. Notably, "Dragon Punch" moves and light anti-air attacks were also made less useful. Infiltration criticized the update, saying that various characters were too harshly nerfed or too strongly buffed. In an interview with Core-A Gaming, Infiltration said that "It might be time to swallow your pride and just go with a top-tier [character]." In the months following the Season 2 update, the Street Fighter V metagame evolved strongly and characters such as Guile, Urien, Balrog, Laura, and Zangief rose in tier lists, despite not having been as viable in the 2016 Tour.

In February 2017, Capcom announced that the prize pool of the Capcom Pro Tour would total $600,000 USD, $100,000 more than the year before. In total, 827 players scored points in the overall ranking.

== Point accumulation and Cup qualification ==
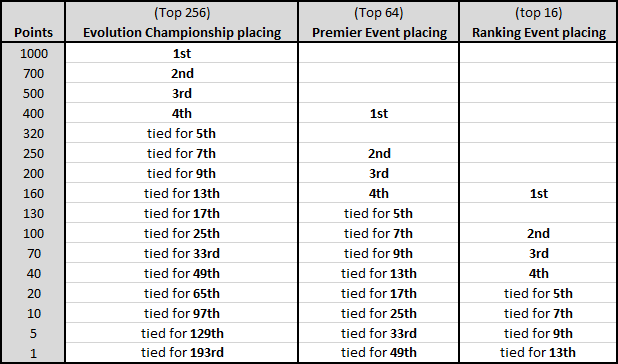
Players can accumulate more points in Premier Event than in Ranking Events, and even more points at Evo 2017. The 30 players with the most points qualify for the 2017 Capcom Cup.

In the 2015 and 2016 Capcom Pro Tours, players automatically qualified for the Capcom Cup if they won one of the fifteen Global Premier events. However, in a December 2016 interview, Capcom's Neidel "Haunts" Crisan suggested that the company might do away with this auto-qualification mechanic as players who win high-profile tournaments are likely to earn enough points to compete in the Capcom Cup either way. The qualification system of previous Capcom Pro Tours had been deemed confusing by fans, especially when more than one player wins several Premier Events. Similarly, the Global and Regional leaderboards used in previous Pro Tours were considered overly complex and Regional Events were abused by international players with higher travel budgets.

Of the 32 players who qualified for the 2017 Capcom Cup, 30 did so through garnering points by consistently placing highly in Pro Tour tournaments. Premier Events rewarded more points than smaller Ranking Events, and the Evo 2017 Street Fighter V tournament offered more points than any other tournament of the season. The 2017 Capcom Pro Tour saw an increase in online Ranking Events, with each region having four of such events. The Pro Tour was again split into four regions: North America, Europe, Latin America, and Asia. Regional tournaments returned to the 2017 Capcom Pro Tour, and qualification for these was based on points acquired exclusively in the applicable region. Only eight players could qualify per Regional tournament, one of which qualified from a "last chance" tournament held the day before the tournament proper.

One of the two auto-qualifications went to NuckleDu for winning the 2016 Capcom Cup. NuckleDu was still incentivised to compete in the Pro Tour because his seed in the Capcom Cup depended on his leaderboard placement. The other auto-qualification was granted to the winner of the Capcom Cup Last Chance Qualifier held the day before the Capcom Cup.

== Tour summary ==
The Capcom Pro Tour kicked off on February 17, 2017, in an event that saw various professional Street Fighter players compete in show matches. This event took place in Folsom Street, San Francisco and featured show matches such as Filipino Champ vs Daigo Umehara, Justin Wong vs Snake Eyez, and a rematch between Capcom Cup 2016 finalists NuckleDu and Ricki Ortiz. The event was simultaneously the launch of Lupe Fiasco's album Drogas Light.

The first tournament in the 2017 Capcom Pro Tour was Final Round 20, taking place on March 10–12 in Atlanta, Georgia. Competitors had roughly two months to familiarize themselves with the Season 2 changes to Street Fighter V before the first Premier Event. Final Round 20 was won by Kun Xian Ho, earning 400 points in the process. The second Premier Event and first European tournament of the 2017 Pro Tour, "Ultimate Fighting Arena", was held in the Stade Jean-Bouin in Paris on April 8–9. This tournament was won by Tatsuya Haitani after a nine-game win streak.

The 2017 NorCal Regionals were held in Sacramento, California on April 14–16. This tournament was won by Victor "Punk" Woodley who defeated NuckleDu in the final game. Punk played mind games during this match, distracting NuckleDu on the character selection screen and teabagging NuckleDu's character whenever he went down. The Premier Event held on April 28–30 – DreamHack Austin – was also won by Punk, beating Kun Xian Ho in the finals. Punk spent little time taunting his opponent during this tournament compared to his behavior at NorCal Regionals. Reporting on DreamHack Austin, Damian Alonzo of ESPN noted that the character Ibuki was rising in prominence among professional Street Fighter players. The character was mostly unused in the 2016 season, but Xian, Fujimura "Yukadon" Atsushi, and Goichi "GO1" Kishida all have since started using the character.

The fifth Premier Event of the 2017 Pro Tour was Battle Arena Melbourne 9, or BAM 9, held in the Melbourne Convention & Exhibition Centre on May 12–14. This tournament was won by Bonchan, using the character Nash to defeat all his opponents. On May 26–28, Combo Breaker 2017 was won by NuckleDu, defeating Snake Eyez in the finals despite losing to him earlier in the tournament. Punk wasn't able to compete in this tournament due to a schedule overlap with Eleague. Community Effort Orlando was won by Snake Eyez, defeating Punk in the finals.

In August, Haitani won the 2017 Japan Cup, defeating Fuudo's R. Mika in the finals. Later that month, on August 25–28, Daigo Umehara won the Hong Kong Esports Festival; this constituted his first win in a Premier Event in nearly a year. In September, the SoCal Regionals were held. This tournament was dominated and won by Japanese player Atsushi "Yukadon" Fujimura.

=== Capcom Cup ===
The Capcom Cup concluding the 2017 Pro Tour was held in December. MenaRD from the Dominican Republic, won using Birdie.

== Downloadable content ==
In April, Capcom announced that it would release new Capcom Pro Tour-themed downloadable content (DLC) for Street Fighter V, as they did in 2016 as well. 30% of the proceeds of Pro Tour-related DLC packs goes towards the overall prize pool of the tournaments, while 50% of the proceeds is invested in the production of the events. Ryu and Ken were declared to be the "featured fighters" of the 2017 season and fans could purchase alternative outfits for these two characters. Among the Pro Tour DLC packages is a "Premier Pass". Owners of such a pass receive monthly in-game objectives in which they can acquire in-game money. These DLC packages are only available for a limited time and the 2016 Pro Tour DLC was not re-released during the 2017 season.
