= Combo Breaker 2017 =

2017 fighting game event in Illinois, US

- 2017

Tournament information
- Location: St. Charles, Illinois
- Dates: May 26, 2017–May 28, 2017
- Venue: Mega Center

Combo Breaker 2017 was a fighting game event that took place in St. Charles, Illinois, on May 26–28, 2017. Twenty different tournaments were held during this event, including a 2017 Capcom Pro Tour Premier Event for Street Fighter V, which was won by NuckleDu. Combo Breaker was the debut of the Injustice 2 Pro Series, a tournament which was won by SonicFox.

== Background ==
Combo Breaker 2017 was the third annual Combo Breaker event since it was rebranded from Ultimate Fighting Game Tournament. ESPN called Combo Breaker the "third-largest fighting game event in the US," only behind the Evolution Championship Series and Community Effort Orlando. Besides featuring a Premier Event for the 2017 Capcom Pro Tour, Combo Breaker 2017 also featured the first tournament of Injustice 2. The convention was held in Mega Center in St. Charles, Illinois, on the weekend of May 26 to May 28.

Other games played at Combo Breaker 2017 included Super Smash Bros. Melee, Super Smash Bros. for Wii U, Tekken 7, Guilty Gear Xrd REV2, and Super Street Fighter II Turbo. In total, twenty different games were played at this event, and were broadcast across seven separate livestreams.

== Tournament summary ==
=== Street Fighter V ===
Combo Breaker 2017 coincided with two major invitational Street Fighter V tournaments in the United States: Eleague and Red Bull Kumite. Due to the scheduling overlap, former Evo winner Keita "Fuudo" Ai and NorCal Regionals and DreamHack Austin winner Victor "Punk" Woodley was unable to attend Combo Breaker, competing in Eleague instead. The schedule was selected by lottery, and both Fuudo and Punk were chosen for the Friday night pools.

The top 8 of the Street Fighter V tournament at Combo Breaker 2017 was dominated by United States players, with only one international player left on the final day of the event, the Japanese Naoto Sako. Though the newcomer Balrog-player Brian "Brian_F" Foster was highly successful, Combo Breaker also saw multiple older players thrive, such as Chris "Chris G" Gonzalez, Justin Wong, and Ryan "Filipinochamp" Ramirez. This tournament was won by Capcom Cup 2016 champion NuckleDu, defeating Snake Eyez in the grand finals. Snake Eyez came in from the winner's bracket after winning a set against NuckleDu's Guile by playing with Zangief. NuckleDu managed to reset the grand finals, however, and though Snake Eyez was ahead of NuckleDu 2–0 in the final game, NuckleDu was eventually able to take the game.

=== Injustice 2 ===
The first Injustice 2 Pro Series event was held at Combo Breaker 2017. This tournament was won by Dominic "SonicFox" McLean, primarily playing the characters Deadshot and Black Adam throughout the top 8. According to ESPN, he was a favorite for the tournament and managed to control the pace of every match in which he played. The grand final was played between SonicFox with Black Adam and Sayed "TekkenMaster" Hashem with Atrocitus. SonicFox had beaten TekkenMaster 3–0 earlier in the tournament, which had made him drop into the loser's bracket. In the finals, SonicFox took the first two games, though TekkenMaster took the third by chip damage. TekkenMaster managed to force a stage transition in their fourth game, but a missed attack created an opening SonicFox was able to exploit, resulting in a 4–1 win.

=== Tekken 7 ===
Ahead of its official console release, Namco Bandai supported a Tekken 7 tournament held at Combo Breaker 2016. During the top 24 matches of the tournament, player KoDee halted his match against Tanukana in order to check the screen resolution of their monitor, to everyone's surprise. Though it is unproven for Tekken 7, some professional fighting game players believe that perform better at a resolution of 720p rather than 1080p. Though KoDee still lost to Tanukana 3–1, he later tweeted that at least five other players had complained about lag. During the finals of this same pool, Tanukana and Mateo attack each other simultaneously and both of their characters are knocked out, resulting in a double KO. Though neither the Combo Breaker 2017 event rules or the Tekken 7 World Tour rules mention anything related to double KOs, the judge decided that the two would need to play another set, which Tanukana went on to win.

The tournament was won by JDCR, defeating Saint in the grand finals.
