= S-rank =

S-rank is a ranking classification that may refer to:

- A ranking originating from academic grading in Japan used to describe a level superlative to grades such as A, B, etc.; it may be used in real or fictional tournaments or ranking lists such as in martial arts, fights in fiction, video games or in tier lists
- A ranking used in NatureServe conservation status
- A ranking used by the Czech search engine Seznam. It is a similar to PageRank with a range from 0 to 10.
