= List of major Super Smash Bros. for Wii U tournaments =

List of most notable tournaments in Super Smash Bros. for Wii U

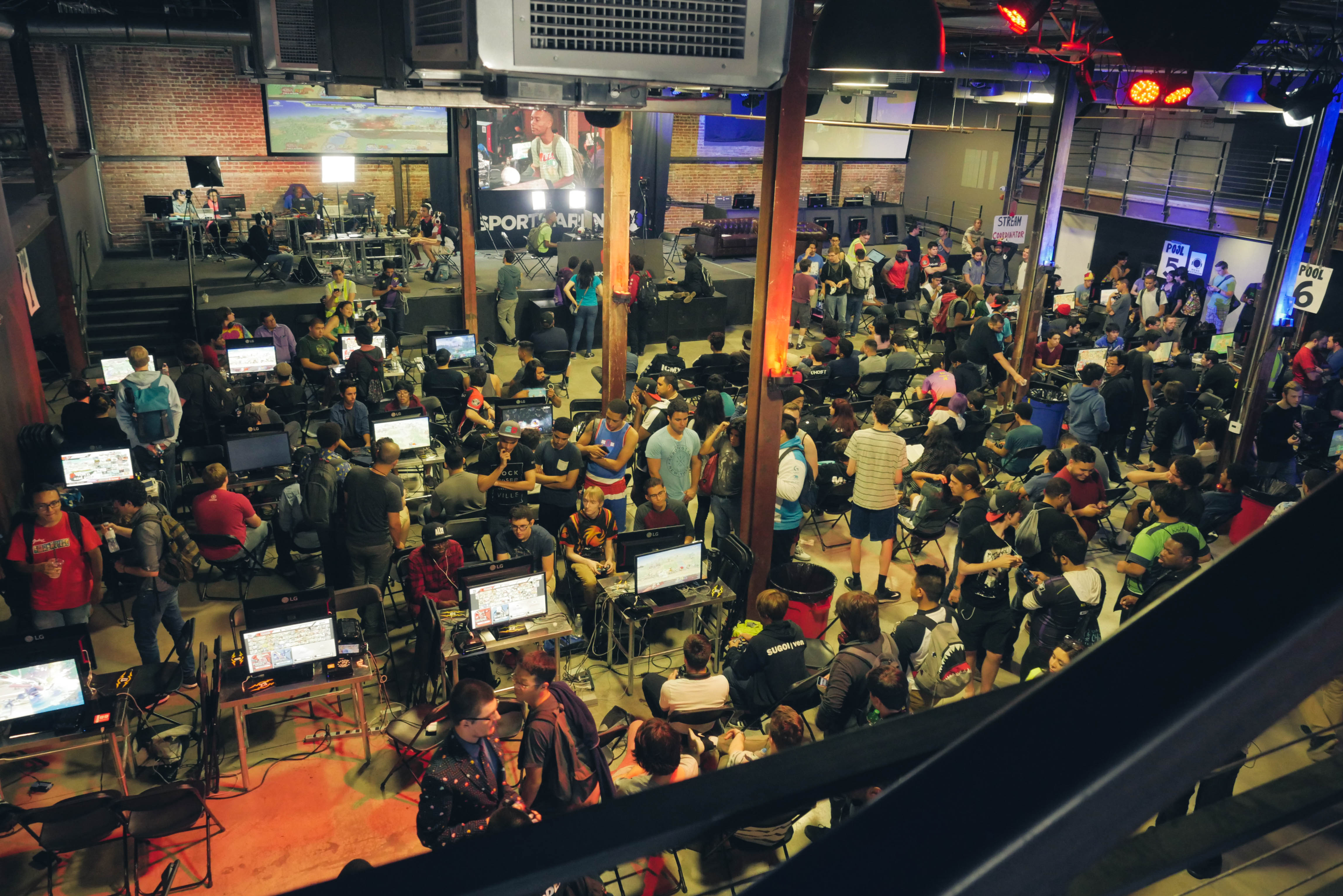
2GGC: Greninja Saga was a PGR A-tier tournament held in May 2017. Several matches are being held in the foreground while a featured match and commentary desk are in the background.

Super Smash Bros. for Wii U, sometimes abbreviated as Smash 4, is a crossover fighting video game for the Wii U. Players control one of 58 characters drawn from Nintendo and third-party game franchises, and try to knock their opponents out of an arena. Each player has a percentage meter which rises as they take damage; characters become easier to knock into the air or out of bounds as the percentage increases.

While Super Smash Bros. for Nintendo 3DS is in many ways the same game, the Nintendo 3DS being a handheld system severely limits its viability as both a competitive game and a spectator sport. While the game was played competitively for a few months before the Wii U version's release, there have been few if any serious competitions for it since.

== Overview ==
Games in the Super Smash Bros. series have been played competitively since the early 2000s, but the inclusion of Super Smash Bros. Melee at the 2013 edition of Evolution Championship Series (EVO), a major multi-game tournament, was seen as a turning point; after EVO 2013, competitive Smash saw an increase in tournaments, media coverage, and attention from Nintendo. Super Smash Bros. for Wii U is the fourth Smash Bros. title; (Note: Alongside its sister title, Super Smash Bros. for Nintendo 3DS, which was released a few months earlier.) all four have been played competitively, as has a fan-made mod of Super Smash Bros. Brawl, Project M. While Smash for Wii U tournament rules initially varied, by 2016 they had standardized; the first player to knock their opponent out of the arena twice within a six-minute match timer wins the set. Matches are played as best-of-three sets in early rounds of the tournament and best-of-five sets in later rounds. Tournaments use the double-elimination format; after their first loss players are sent to a lower bracket to compete against other players on their first loss, and following their second loss players are eliminated from the competition.

Super Smash Bros. for Wii U was released in North America and Europe in November 2014 and in Japan the following month. The game was both a critical and commercial success; it received strong reviews, and became the fastest-selling Wii U game in the United States, with almost half a million copies sold within its first three days. As of March 2020, it sold over 5.3 million copies. However, despite the game's popularity, prize pools for Smash tournaments were well below those of other esports. Unlike many other developers, Nintendo does not contribute to tournament prize pools. At EVO 2017, Smash for Wii U had 1,515 competitors and a prize pool of $15,150, funded entirely from entrance fees. At the same tournament, Injustice 2 had a prize pool of $50,000, despite having around half as many competitors, due to funding from its publisher, Warner Bros. Interactive. Gonzalo "ZeRo" Barrios, widely considered the greatest Smash for Wii U player of all time, stated in 2018 that one could earn more by working at McDonald's than by winning EVO, and that he had earned only $45,000 for winning a world record 56 consecutive tournaments across 2015 and 2016.

Smash Bros. tournaments are generally seeded so that the best players do not face off against each other until the later stages of an event. The most authoritative ranking of Super Smash Bros. for Wii U players is the Panda Global Rankings (PGR). Five editions of the PGR rankings were released, covering tournaments held between 2015 and 2018. The PGR 100, a ranking of the 100 best Smash for Wii U players of all time, was released after the last regular ranking, and factored six more major tournaments into the rankings. In late 2018, the next Super Smash Bros. title, Ultimate, was released, and the PGR shifted to cover that game; since then, there have been very few Smash for Wii U tournaments, and none of comparable size/prestige to when it was the newest instalment. In the first two rankings, covering 2015 and 2016, the PGR designated a combined 13 tournaments as major events with increased influence on the rankings. Beginning with the third edition of the PGR, tournaments were grouped into one of four tiers – S, A, B, and C – based on the number of competitors with S being the most prestigious tier and C the least. In the fifth PGR, S was replaced with A+. This list contains all PGR majors, S-tier, A+-tier, and A-tier events from the release of Smash for Wii U through the end of the PGR in 2018.

== PGR major tournaments ==
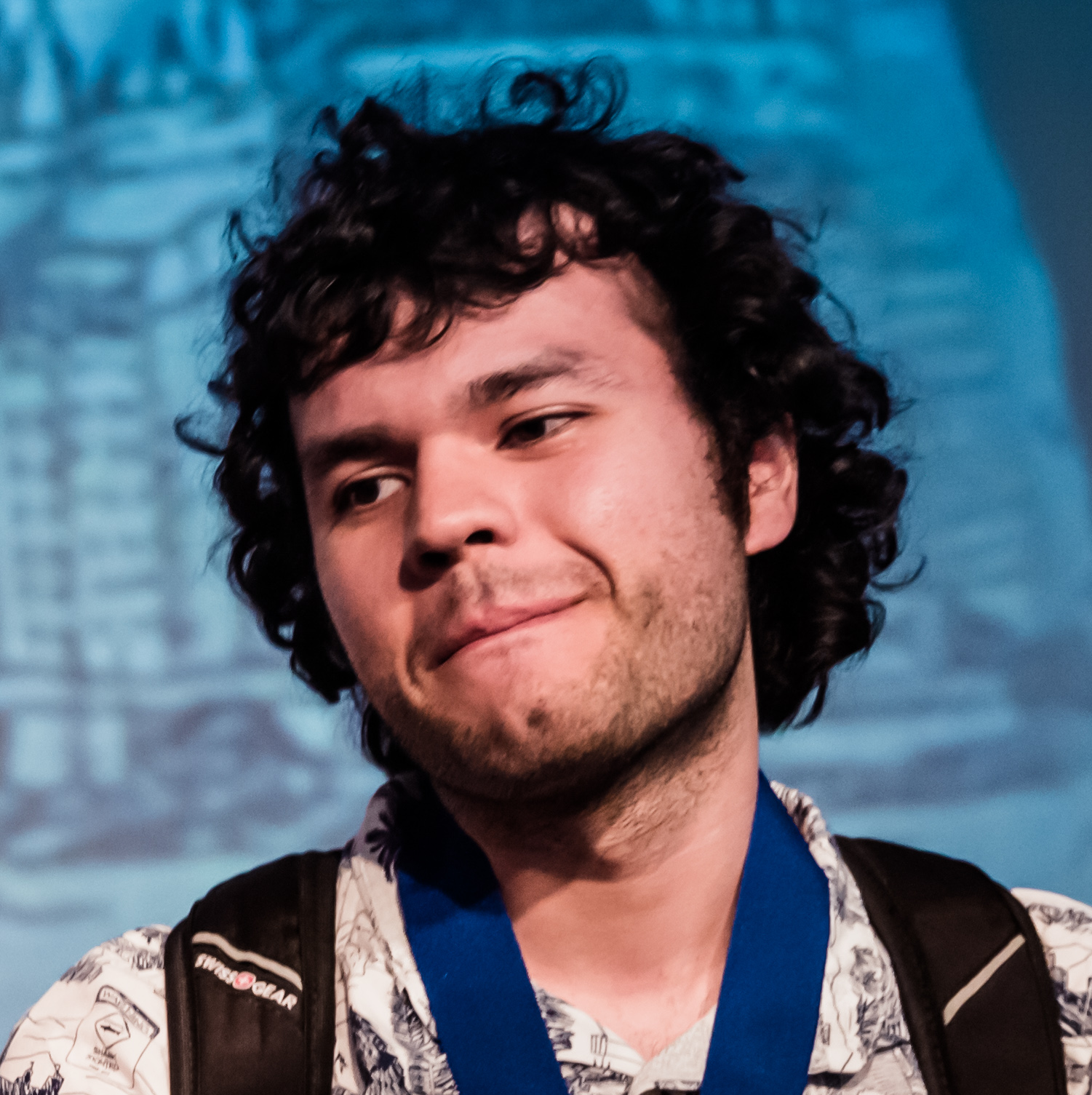
Ally won EVO 2016, the largest Super Smash Bros. for Wii U tournament by number of entrants.

The following is a list of results from Super Smash Bros. for Wii U tournaments in 2015 and 2016 considered major by the Panda Global Rankings. (Note: Early PGR seasons did not group tournaments into tiers.)

List of major Super Smash Bros. for Wii U tournaments in 2015 and 2016
Tournament	Location	Date	Entrants (Note: Entrant counts are drawn from tournament brackets. This data is self-reported.)	Prize pool	1st	2nd	3rd	4th	Refs.
APEX 2015	Somerset, New Jersey, United States	January 30–February 1, 2015	734	$15,055	(Chile) ZeRo	(United States) Dabuz	(Netherlands) Mr. R	(United States) 6WX	
CEO 2015	Orlando, Florida, United States	June 26–28, 2015	512	Unknown	(Chile) ZeRo	(United States) Nairo	(United States) Dabuz	(United States) Larry Lurr	
EVO 2015	Las Vegas, Nevada, United States	July 17–19, 2015	1,926	Unknown	(Chile) ZeRo	(Netherlands) Mr. R	(United States) Nairo	(Japan) Abadango	
Paragon Los Angeles 2015	Ontario, California, United States	September 5–6, 2015	505	Unknown	(United States) Nairo	(United States) Dabuz	(United States) MVD	(Canada) Ally	
The Big House 5	Dearborn, Michigan United States	October 2–4, 2015	512	$6,120	(Chile) ZeRo	(United States) Nairo	(United States) Dabuz	(United States) ANTi	
GENESIS 3	San Jose, California, United States	January 15–17, 2016	1,096	$13,930	(Chile) ZeRo	(United States) Dabuz	(Japan) Ranai	(United States) VoiD	
Pound 2016	McLean, Virginia, United States	April 2–3, 2016	513	Unknown	(Japan) Abadango	(Canada) Ally	(United States) Marss	(Netherlands) Mr. R	
CEO 2016	Orlando, Florida, United States	June 24–26, 2016	906	Unknown	(United States) ANTi	(United States) Zinoto	(United States) Dabuz	(Japan) Abadango	
EVO 2016	Las Vegas, Nevada, United States	July 15–17, 2016	2,662	$26,620	(Canada) Ally	(Japan) Kameme (Note: Kameme competed at Evo 2016 under the name Kamemushi, and changed his handle to Kameme later that year.)	(Chile) ZeRo	(United States) VoiD	
Super Smash Con 2016	Chantilly, Virginia, United States	August 11–14, 2016	1,272	Unknown	(United States) Nairo	(United States) Dabuz	(Netherlands) Mr. R	(United States) VoiD	
The Big House 6	Dearborn, Michigan, United States	October 7–9, 2016	777	Unknown	(Chile) ZeRo	(United States) ANTi	(Japan) Komorikiri	(Netherlands) Mr. R	
UGC Smash Open	Collinsville, Illinois, United States	December 2–4, 2016	205	$15,000+	(Chile) ZeRo	(Japan) Abadango	(United States) ESAM	(United States) Nairo	
2GGT ZeRo Saga	Las Vegas, Nevada, United States	December 16–18, 2016	361	$10,000+	(Mexico) MkLeo	(United States) Larry Lurr	(United States) VoiD	(Chile) ZeRo	

== PGR S-tier and A+-tier tournaments ==
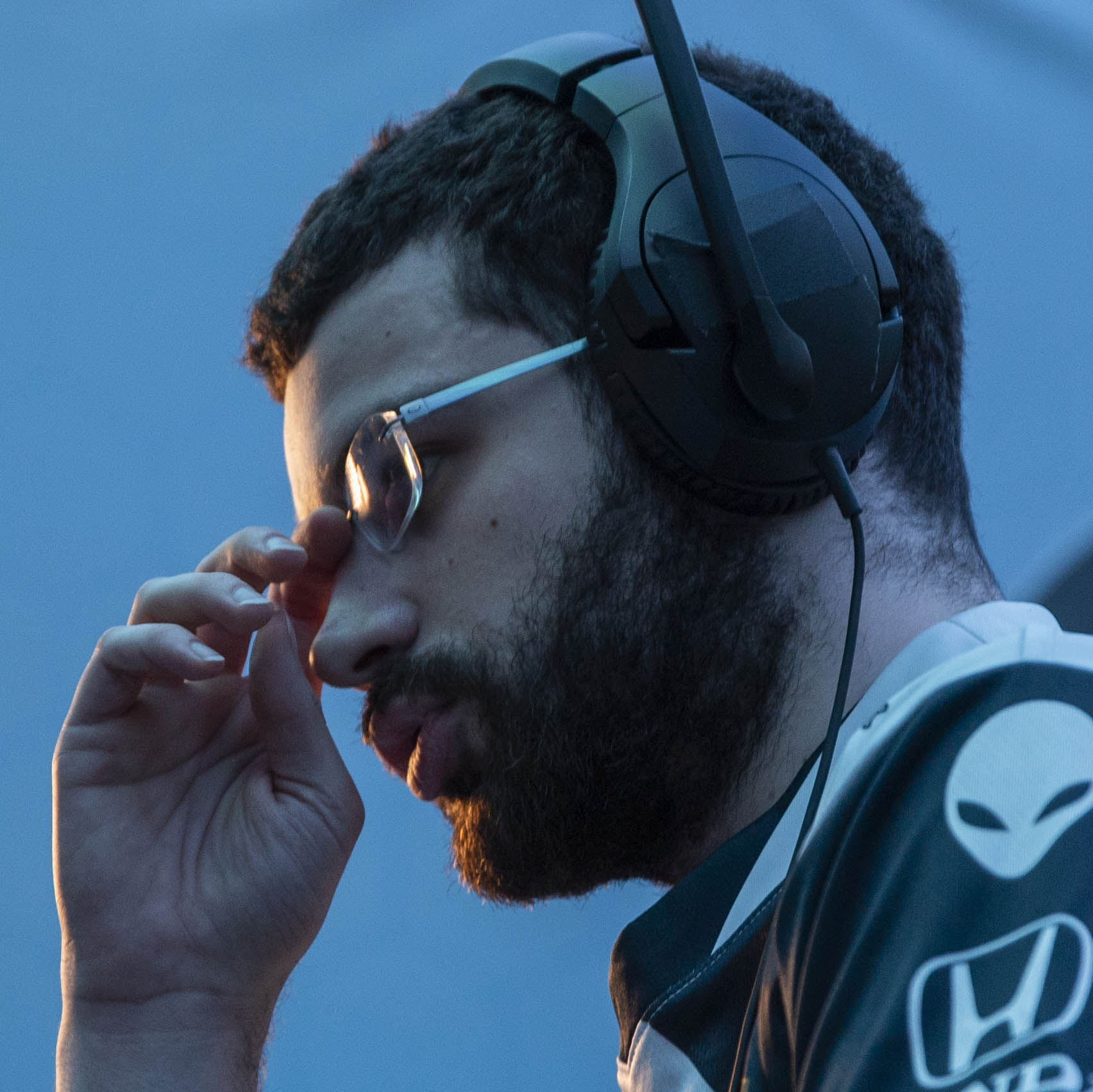
Dabuz won 2GGC: Civil War, which Yahoo Esports called "the most talent-heavy tournament in Super Smash Bros. for Wii U history."

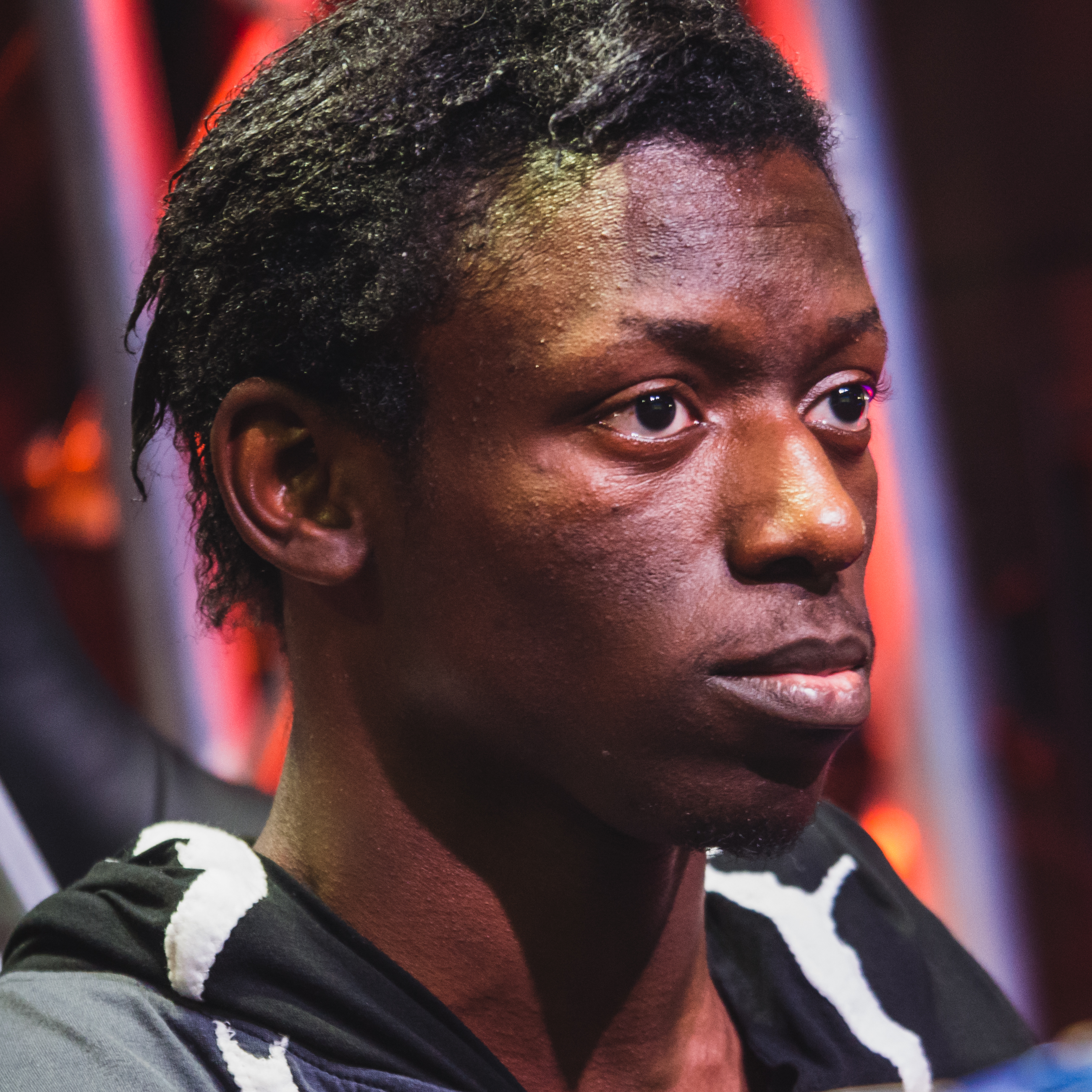
Salem won two major tournaments, EVO 2017 and DreamHack Atlanta 2017, on back-to-back weekends.

The following is a list of results from Super Smash Bros. for Wii U tournaments considered S-tier or A+-tier by the Panda Global Rankings. (Note: The "PGRv4 TTS", "PGRv5 TTS", and "PGR100 TTS" Google Sheets are the official PGR tournament listings, linked to from the PGR FAQ.)

List of S-tier Super Smash Bros. for Wii U tournaments in 2017-2018
Tournament	Location	Date	Entrants	Prize pool	1st	2nd	3rd	4th	Refs.
GENESIS 4	San Jose, California, United States	January 20–22, 2017	1,010	Unknown	(Mexico) MkLeo	(Canada) Ally	(Chile) ZeRo	(United States) CaptainZack	
2GGC: Civil War	Santa Ana, California, United States	March 24–26, 2017	573	$15,000	(United States) Dabuz	(United States) Fatality	(Japan) T	(United States) CaptainZack	
2GGC: Nairo Saga	Santa Ana, California, United States	June 10–11, 2017	485	$20,000	(Chile) ZeRo	(United States) Salem	(Mexico) MkLeo	(United States) Nairo	
CEO 2017	Ontario, California, United States	June 16–18, 2017	611	Unknown	(Chile) ZeRo	(Mexico) MkLeo	(United States) Larry Lurr	(United States) Nairo	
EVO 2017	Las Vegas, Nevada, United States	July 14–16, 2017	1,515	$15,150	(United States) Salem	(Chile) ZeRo	(United States) Larry Lurr	(United States) Tweek	
DreamHack Atlanta 2017	Atlanta, Georgia, United States	July 21–23, 2017	393	$10,000	(United States) Salem	(United States) VoiD	(United States) Tweek	(United States) Nairo	
Super Smash Con 2017	Chantilly, Virginia, United States	August 10–13, 2017	1,531	Unknown	(United States) Nairo	(Chile) ZeRo	(Mexico) MkLeo	(Netherlands) Mr. R	
2GGC: SCR Saga	Santa Ana, California, United States	August 19–20, 2017	301	$3,000+	(Chile) ZeRo	(Mexico) MkLeo	(United States) Larry Lurr	(Canada) Mistake	
Shine 2017	Boston, Massachusetts, United States	August 25–27, 2017	659	Unknown	(Chile) ZeRo	(United States) Tweek	(United States) Nairo	(United States) Salem	
Game Tyrant Expo 2017	Salt Lake City, Utah, United States	September 29–October 1, 2017	332	$30,000	(Mexico) MkLeo	(United States) Elegant	(Chile) ZeRo	(United States) Larry Lurr	
The Big House 7	Detroit, Michigan, United States	October 6–8, 2017	512	Unknown	(United States) Dabuz	(United States) Marss	(United States) Cosmos	(Chile) ZeRo	
2GGC: Fire Emblem Saga	Santa Ana, California, United States	October 14–15, 2017	351	Unknown	(United States) Salem	(United States) Nairo	(Japan) Komorikiri	(United States) Tweek	
2GGC: MkLeo Saga	Santa Ana, California, United States	November 4, 2017	313	Unknown	(United States) Tweek	(Japan) KEN	(Mexico) MkLeo	(United States) Nairo	
2GG Championship	Santa Ana, California, United States	December 1–3, 2017	20 (Note: The tournament was preceded by a last-chance qualifier for the main event, with 132 entrants.)	$50,000	(Mexico) MkLeo	(Chile) ZeRo	(United States) Salem	(United States) Dabuz	
2GG: Hyrule Saga	Long Beach, California, United States	June 23–24, 2018	780	Unknown	(United States) Tweek	(Netherlands) Mr. R	(United States) Dabuz	(United States) ANTi	
CEO 2018	Orlando, Florida, United States	June 29–July 1, 2018	679	Unknown	(Mexico) MkLeo	(United States) Tweek	(United States) Cosmos	(United States) CaptainZack	
EVO 2018	Las Vegas, California, United States	August 3–5, 2018	1,358	Unknown	(United States) Lima	(United States) CaptainZack	(Japan) Nietono	(Canada) Mistake	
Super Smash Con 2018	Chantilly, Virginia, United States	August 9–12, 2018	1,380	Unknown	(Mexico) MkLeo	(United States) Samsora	(United States) Tweek	(United States) Cosmos	

== PGR A-tier tournaments ==
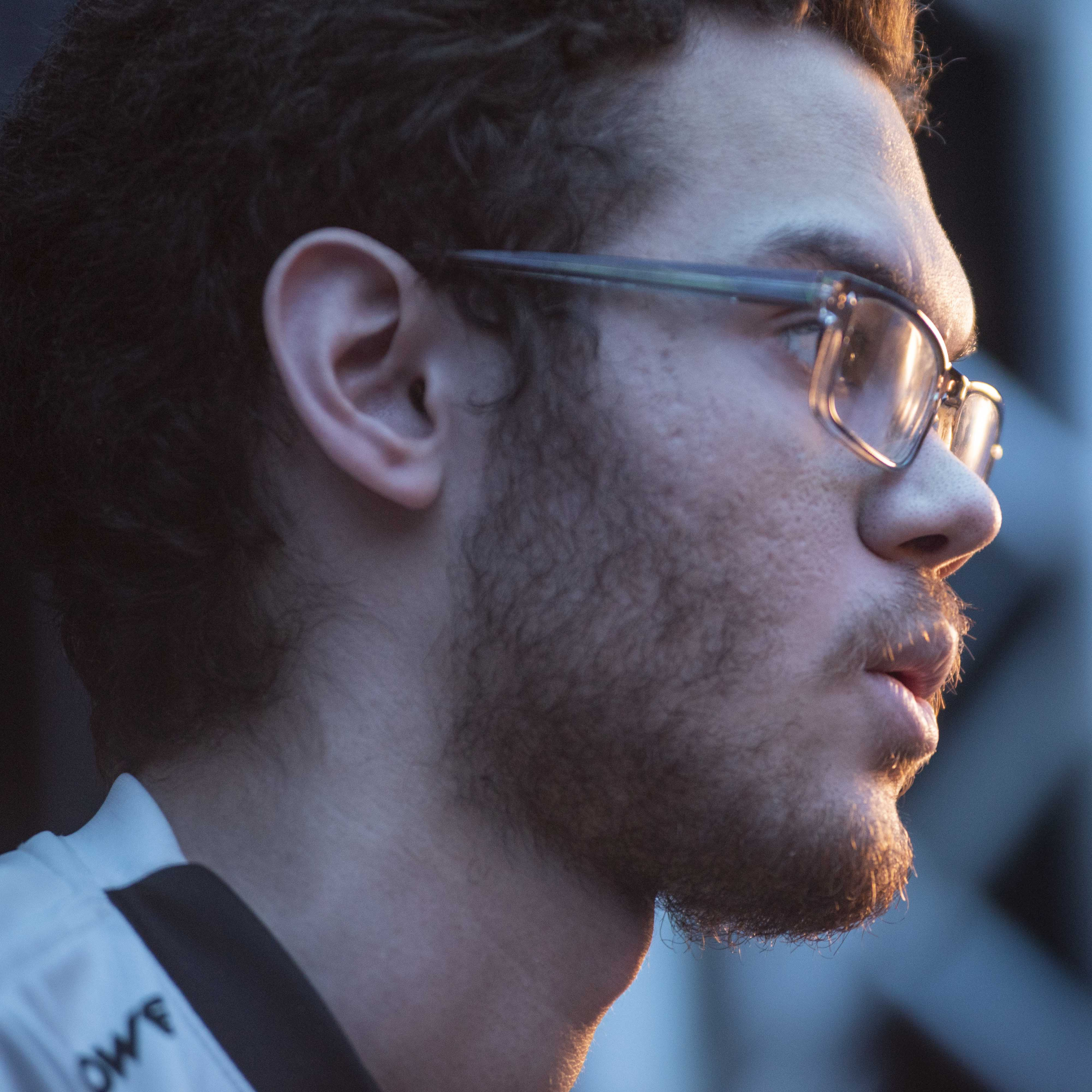
Nairo won Smash Masters League: Battle for Vegas, the tournament with the largest prize pool of 2018.

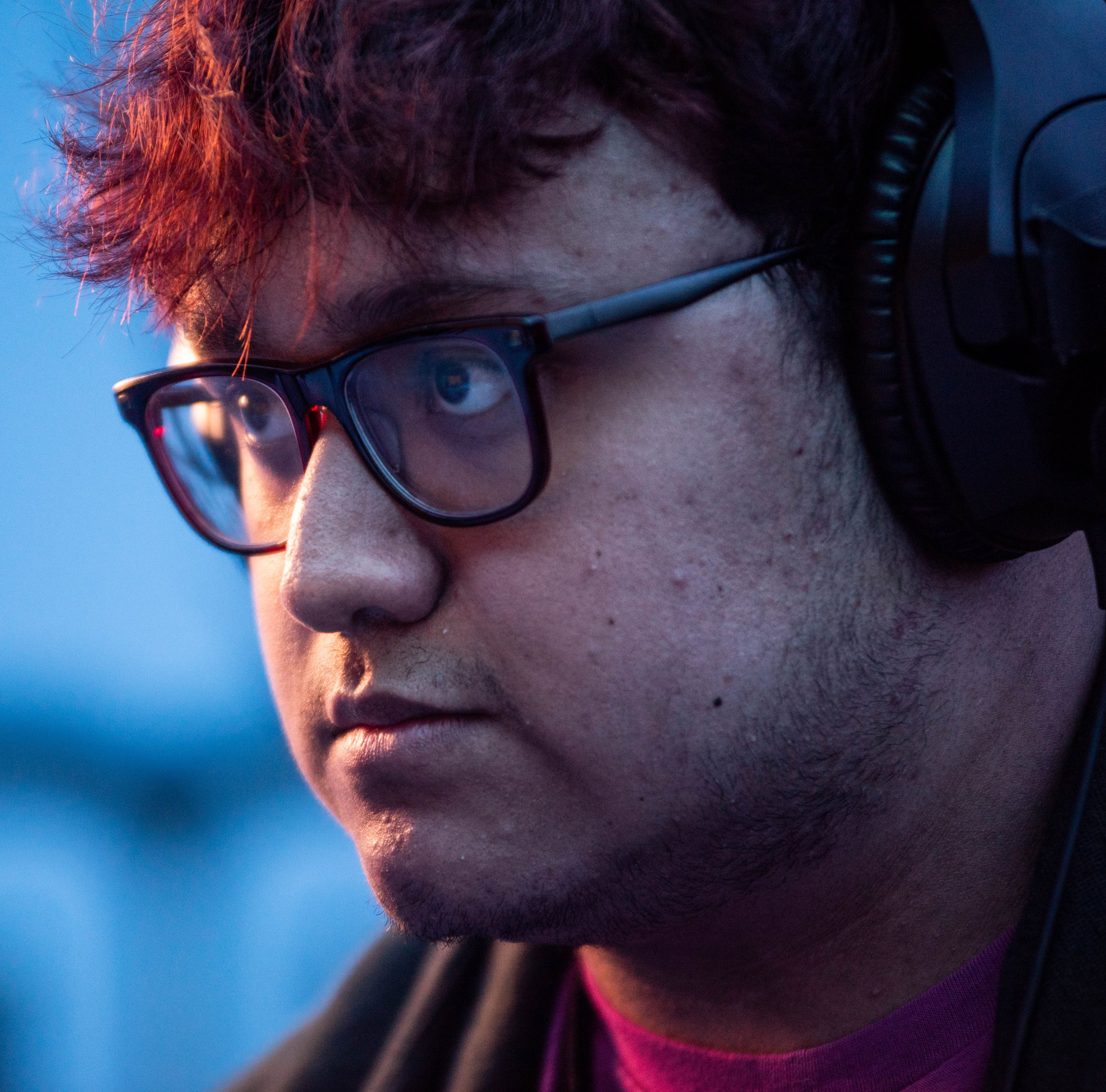
MkLeo won Umebura Japan Major and Get On My Level 2018, the only two major Smash for Wii U events held outside the United States.

The following is a list of results from Super Smash Bros. for Wii U tournaments considered A-tier by the Panda Global Rankings.

List of A-tier Super Smash Bros. for Wii U tournaments in 2017-2018
Tournament	Location	Date	Entrants	Prize pool	1st	2nd	3rd	4th	Refs.
2GGC: Genesis Saga	Santa Ana, California, United States	January 14, 2017	466	$2,000+	(Chile) ZeRo	(Japan) Komorikiri	(United States) VoiD	(United States) Tweek	
2GGC: Midwest Mayhem Saga	Santa Ana, California, United States	February 11, 2017	331	$2,000+	(Chile) ZeRo	(United States) Tweek	(Japan) Komorikiri	(United States) Ned	
Frostbite 2017	Ann Arbor, Michigan, United States	February 25–26, 2017	342	Unknown	(Chile) ZeRo	(Japan) Tsu	(United States) Nairo	(United States) Dabuz	
Frame Perfect Series 2	Orlando, Florida, United States	March 18–19, 2017	208	$1,500+	(Japan) Kirihara	(Chile) ZeRo	(Mexico) MkLeo	(Japan) Komorikiri	
CEO Dreamland	Orlando, Florida, United States	April 14–16, 2017	376	Unknown	(Chile) ZeRo	(Netherlands) Mr. R	(United States) Nairo	(United States) Dabuz	
DreamHack Austin 2017	Austin, Texas, United States	April 28–30, 2017	313	$10,000	(Chile) ZeRo	(Mexico) MkLeo	(Canada) Ally	(United States) Larry Lurr	
Umebura Japan Major	Tokyo, Japan	May 6–8, 2017	478	Unknown	(Mexico) MkLeo	(Japan) KEN	(Japan) Choco	(Japan) 9B	
Royal Flush 2017	Atlantic City, New Jersey, United States	May 12–14, 2017	146	$5,000	(Chile) ZeRo	(Netherlands) Mr. R	(United States) Tweek	(United States) VoiD	
2GGC: Greninja Saga	Santa Ana, California, United States	May 20, 2017	350	$5,000+	(Canada) Ally	(United States) Larry Lurr	(Japan) Komorikiri	(United States) ANTi	
MomoCon 2017	Atlanta, Georgia, United States	May 25–28, 2017	286	$5,000+	(United States) Nairo	(United States) Fatality	(Chile) ZeRo	(United States) Larry Lurr	
Smash'N'Splash 3	Wisconsin Dells, Wisconsin, United States	June 2–4, 2017	444	Unknown	(Chile) ZeRo	(Canada) Ally	(United States) Larry Lurr	(United States) Tweek	
2GGC: Arms Saga	Santa Ana, California, United States	July 8–9, 2017	200	$1,500+	(United States) Dabuz	(Chile) ZeRo	(Japan) KEN	(United States) VoiD	
PAX Arena at PAX West 2017	Seattle, Washington, United States	September 1–4, 2017	12	Unknown	(Chile) ZeRo	(United States) Nairo	(United States) Salem	(Canada) Ally	
2GGC: West Side Saga	Santa Ana, California, United States	September 9, 2017	300	$2,000+	(Chile) ZeRo	(United States) Tweek	(Japan) Shuton	(Japan) KEN	
IBP Masters Showdown	Santa Ana, California, United States	November 11–12, 2017	131	$10,000	(Mexico) MkLeo	(United States) Larry Lurr	(Japan) KEN	(Japan) Komorikiri	
Genesis 5	Oakland, California, United States	January 19–21, 2018	674	Unknown	(Mexico) MkLeo	(Canada) Mistake	(United States) Salem	(United States) Nairo	
Frostbite 2018	Dearborn, Michigan, United States	February 9–11, 2018	866	Unknown	(United States) Dabuz	(United States) Tweek	(Canada) Mistake	(United States) Salem	
SML: Battle for Vegas	Las Vegas, Nevada, United States	March 24–27, 2018	154	$25,000	(United States) Nairo	(Mexico) MkLeo	(Canada) Mistake	(United States) Fatality	
SwitchFest	Long Beach, California, United States	April 21–22, 2018	162	Unknown	(Mexico) MkLeo	(United States) Nairo	(United States) Larry Lurr	(Japan) Komorikiri	
Get On My Level 2018	Mississauga, Ontario, Canada	May 18–20, 2018	446	Unknown	(Mexico) MkLeo	(United States) Nairo	(Canada) Mistake	(Japan) Komorikiri	
MomoCon 2018	Atlanta, Georgia, United States	May 24–27, 2018	353	$5,000	(United States) Tweek	(United States) Salem	(Japan) Komorikiri	(United States) Nairo	
Smash'N'Splash 4	Wisconsin Dells, Wisconsin, United States	June 1–3, 2018	527	$5,000+	(United States) VoiD	(United States) Salem	(Mexico) MkLeo	(United States) Light	
Smash Sounds	Brooklyn, New York, United States	July 7–8, 2018	261	Unknown	(United States) Dabuz	(Japan) Abadango	(Japan) Shuton	(United States) Light	
Shine 2018	Boston, Massachusetts, United States	August 24–26, 2018	472	Unknown	(United States) Salem	(Canada) Mistake	(United States) Tweek	(United States) Light	
The Big House 8	Detroit, Michigan, United States	October 5–7, 2018	281	Unknown	(United States) Cosmos	(United States) ESAM	(United States) Tweek	(United States) yeti	
DreamHack Atlanta 2018	Atlanta, Georgia, United States	November 16–18, 2018	280	Unknown	(United States) Tweek	(United States) Dabuz	(United States) VoiD	(United States) Wrath	
