= Tea bag (disambiguation) =

A tea bag is a sealed bag containing tea leaves for brewing tea.

Tea bag or variations may also refer to:

- Teabagging (sexual act), a man placing his scrotum in the mouth, or on the face, of another person. (Also, the name for a mocking gesture in multiplayer online video games where the victorious player simulates the movement over their defeated opponent.)

== Fiction ==
- T-Bag, a children's television series character
- Theodore "T-Bag" Bagwell, a character on the television show Prison Break

== Politics ==
- Tea bag protests, another name for the Tea Party protests
- Teabagger, a controversial pejorative term for Tea Party movement participants
