= DreamHack Austin 2017 =

Esports tournament in Austin, Texas

- 2017

Tournament information
- Location: Austin, Texas
- Dates: April 28, 2017–April 30, 2017
- Host: DreamHack

DreamHack Austin 2017 was a video game convention and esports event held by DreamHack in Austin, Texas, on April 28–30, 2017. DreamHack Austin hosted the DreamHack Astro Open Counter Strike: Global Offensive tournament, as well as tournaments for Super Smash Bros., Street Fighter V, and StarCraft II.

== Background ==
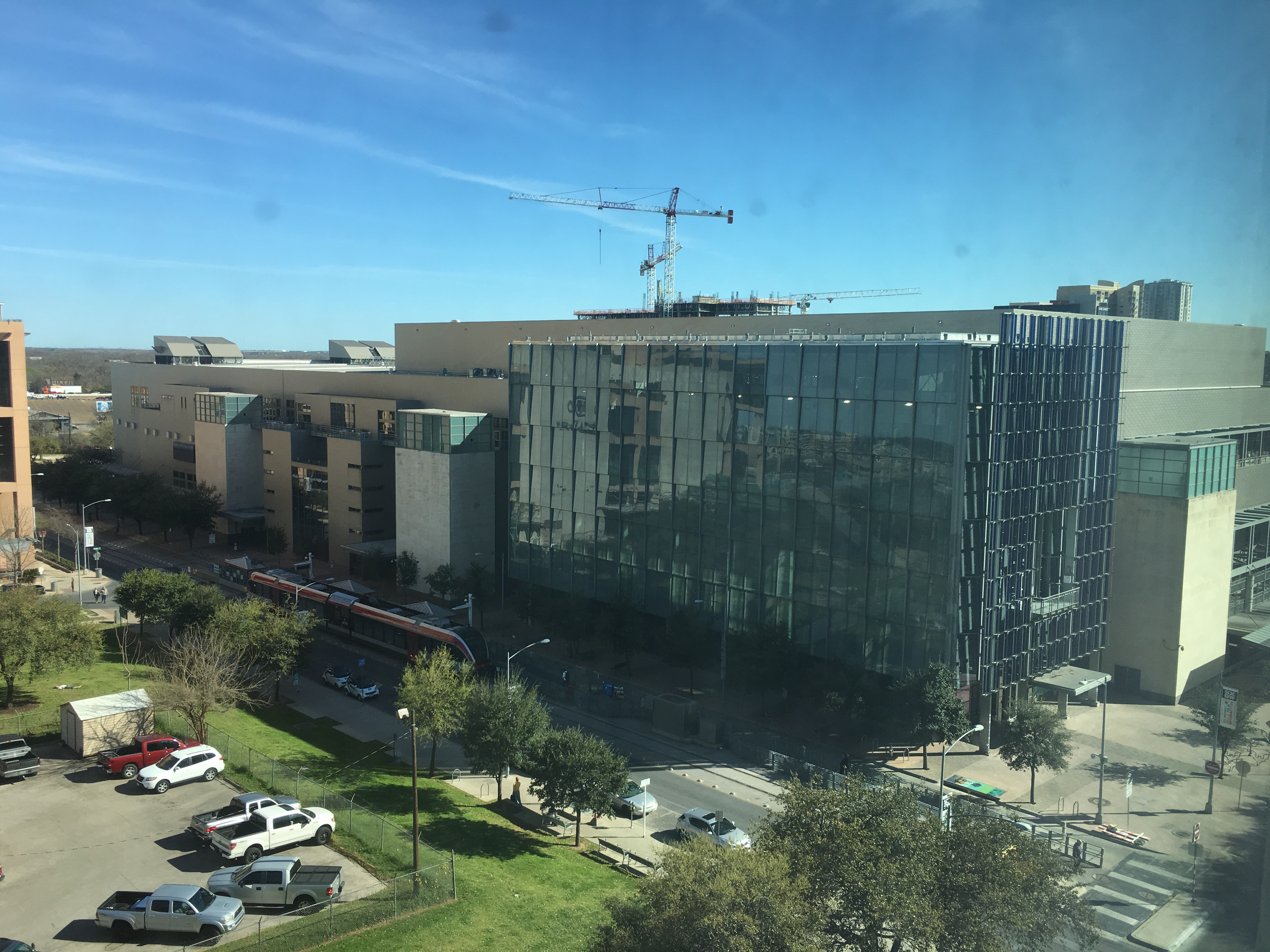
DreamHack Austin was held in the Austin Convention Center.

DreamHack Austin 2017 was held in the Austin Convention Center from April 28 to April 30, 2017. Asus Republic of Gamers had a booth at the convention and Asus, Intel and PC Gamer collaborated to set up gaming laptops and desktops, as well as a virtual reality station, in the "free-to-play" area. Austin was the first DreamHack event to be livestreamed directly on Twitter as part of a 2017 partnership between the two organizations.

DreamHack Austin featured major tournaments for Counter Strike: Global Offensive, Super Smash Bros. Melee, Super Smash Bros. for Wii U, and StarCraft II. The Street Fighter V tournament held at this event was a Premier Event of the 2016 Capcom Pro Tour. Some of the smaller side-tournaments held at DreamHack Austin included Pokkén Tournament, For Honor, Guilty Gear Xrd, and NBA 2K.

== Tournaments ==
=== Counter Strike: Global Offensive ===
Dubbed "DreamHack Astro Open 2017", the Counter Strike: Global Offensive tournament held at DreamHack Austin featured eight teams and spanned the entire weekend. Six "Group Stage" matches were held on Friday, four playoffs on Saturday, and the semifinals and grand final were held on Sunday. Teams such as Cloud9, Immortals and Team Liquid played on their home turf during this event. G2 Esports had just overhauled their roster with former Team EnVyUs members earlier in the year, and sports news website FanSided noted that Gambit Esports had performed well during cs_summit this same month.

The Immortals, led by Lincoln "fnx" Lau, defeated the team Heroic during the semifinals, taking 10 straight rounds in the first half of their second game. The two teams traded rounds at the start of the third game, but the Immortals eventually made a 16–13 win and went into the grand finals. The second match of the tournament was between Gambit and G2. Three overtime sets were needed before G2 was able to make a 25–22 win in their first game. G2 had a 10–3 lead at one point in their second game, but Gambit made a comeback and eventually won the second game 16–12, forcing a third game, which Gambit managed to win as well with a 16–14 lead.

The Immortals and Gambit faced off in the grand finals, playing their first game on the map "Train". The Immortals rushed into a 3–0 lead early on, but eventually lost the first game 16–12 after Gambit won five rounds in a row. The second game was held on "Inferno" and Gambit gained a 9–1 lead in the first half. Though Gambit eventually reached a 14–7 lead in the second half, the Immortals managed to close the gap by winning another five rounds in a row: Gambit won the second round 16–12. At the end of the game, two Gambit members – Dosia and Mou – each had accumulated 46 kills, and four of the five team members had delivered over 74 damage per round (ADR), while only two Immortals members had over 70 ADR.

Competitors raised complaints about the noise at the event. All players were required to use Astro headphones during the tournament, but these failed to properly dampen outside noise during gameplay. G2 member Shox raised the issue during a post match interview.

=== StarCraft II ===
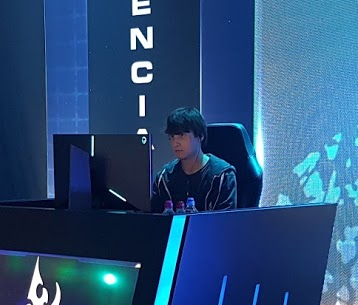
Alex "Neeb" Sunderhaft, DreamHack Austin 2017 StarCraft II champion.

80 players attended the DreamHack Austin StarCraft II tournament in order to qualify for the World Championship Series. The tournament was won by Alex "Neeb" Sunderhaft, who defeated Artur "Nerchio" Bloch 4–2 in the finals. Neeb was already a favorite before the tournament started, but seemed to have difficulty making it through the group stage, qualifying second from his group. Nerchio made it through the group stage in a much cleaner manner and entered the grand final with only three game losses. Neeb was overzealous and exposed his Mothership Core in their first match, which allowed Nerchio to take the first match. The rest of the set had a slow pace as Neeb took control of the map and dictated when each fight would take place; Neeb defeated Nerchio through stronger unit composition and a deliberate pace.

=== Street Fighter V ===
The fighting game tournaments at DreamHack Austin 2017 were organized by Alex Jebailey. The Street Fighter V tournament held at the event was the fourth Premier Event of the 2016 Capcom Pro Tour. Besides adding $15,000 USD to the tournament's prize pool, this meant that the winner of the tournament would be likely to qualify for the 2016 Capcom Cup. The tournament was won by Victor "Punk" Woodley, despite being knocked into the loser's bracket early on in the tournament. In contrast to his behavior at the 2017 NorCal Regionals, Punk spent much less time taunting and teabagging his opponents, Compete describing his actions as much more "polite". Punk matched off against Final Round 20 winner Kun Xian Ho in the finals and made quick work of him, staying outside of Xian's range and consistently punishing his mistakes.

Multiple professional Street Fighter players switched to the character Ibuki during this tournament, including Fujimura "Yukadon" Atsushi, Goichi "GO1" Kishida, and Xian. However, under pressure of Punk's success, Xian switched back to his previous main character F.A.N.G. before the final round. Despite F.A.N.G.'s low placement on tier lists, Xian's last-minute switch resulted in a much closer final round.

=== Super Smash Bros. ===
The Super Smash Bros. Melee tournament held at DreamHack Austin 2017 featured high-level players such as Hungrybox, Mew2King, MKLeo, and ZeRo. Adam "Armada" Lindgren decided to skip the tournament because his GameCube controller was performing inadequately and he was not able to find a replacement with the proper malfunctions. In the loser's bracket, Mew2King proved fairly successful, defeating players such as William "Leffen" Hjelte, Justin "Plup" McGrath, and Joseph "Mang0" Marquez, but he eventually lost to Daniel "ChuDat" Rodriguez in the loser's finals. ChuDat went on to fight Hungrybox in the grand finals. The first few rounds were described as a "high-level spectacle" by ESPN, as ChuDat's Ice Climbers went up against Hungrybox' Jigglypuff. However, during the last round, Hungrybox saw he was slightly ahead of his opponent and decided to run out the clock, using Jigglypuff's superior air time to consistently evade ChuDat's attacks. ChuDat sacrificed a life in order to get his character back to full potential, but he still was not able to significantly damage his opponent. ChuDat refused to shake Hungrybox' hand after the latter was announced victorious.
