= T bag =

T bag may refer to:

- Tea bag
- T-Bag, a British television programme
- Tea bag (sexual act)
- T-Bag (Prison Break), a fictional character from Prison Break
