= NorCal Regionals 2017 =

- 2017

Tournament information
- Sport: Street Fighter V
- Location: Sacramento, California
- Dates: April 14–16
- Tournament format: Double elimination

Final positions
- Champion: Victor "Punk" Woodley
- Runner-up: NuckleDu

NorCal Regionals 2017 (sometimes shortened as NCR 2017) was a Street Fighter V tournament that took place in Sacramento, California on April 14-16. Being one of the eleven Premier Events of the 2017 Capcom Pro Tour, the winner of the tournament automatically qualified for the Capcom Cup in December 2017. This was the 15th NorCal Regionals event and the second to feature a "death pool" for competitors who failed to register ahead of time. The tournament was won by Victor "Punk" Woodley, who spent much of the final match taunting his opponent NuckleDu.

== Background ==
NorCal Regionals 2017 was hosted in Sacramento, California on April 14-16. Much like in 2016, NorCal Regionals 2017 featured a "death pool" for all competitors that registered on-site rather than in advance. Tournament organizer John Choi stated that this featured returned because "people really liked [having] exciting matches right off the bat." The winner of the 2016 death pool, Martin "Marn" Phan, registered in time, but told ESPN that he planned to de-register himself so he can battle through the death pool again, stating that he wanted to do it every year.

Competitors in NorCal Regionals 2017 included NuckleDu, Tatsuya Haitani, Yusuke Momochi, Justin Wong, Daigo Umehara, Tokido, Fuudo, and Eduardo "PR Balrog" Perez. A few days before NorCal regionals, Evo 2016-winner Lee "Infiltration" Seon-woo announced through Twitter that he had canceled his flight tickets for Sacramento, stating that he was not yet ready to attend Capcom Pro Tour events.

NorCal Regionals also features other fighting game tournaments, such as for Marvel vs. Capcom 3 and Tekken 7.

== Finale ==
The finale of NorCal Regionals 2017 came down between Capcom Cup 2016-champion Du "NuckleDu" Dang and Panda Global's Victor "Punk" Woodley. After NuckleDu bested Punk in the winners semifinals, Punk entered the finals from the loser's side of the brackets and had to beat NuckleDu in two best-of-five sets in order to win the tournament. Punk won the first set three-to-one, using the character Karin to counter many of his opponent's Guile's attacks. After this, Punk started to play mind games, distracting NuckleDu on the character selection screen and teabagging during subsequent matches. After a successful combo or stun attack, Punk frequently pressed "down" on his controller to make Karin crouch, taunting his opponent. Punk took the second match three-to-one as well, winning the tournament. NuckleDu is known for teabagging himself as well. After the tournament, Punk told Kotaku that he uses teabagging to undermine and distract his opponents, stating that the taunt "gets in certain people's heads and messes them up." Though this behavior was answered by laughs and cheers from the crowd, Punk's teabagging proved controversial throughout the fighting game community.
