= Smashboards =

Online forum covering Super Smash Bros.

Smashboards (originally known as Smash World Forums) is an online forum centered on games from the Super Smash Bros. series, founded in 2002. The community hosts discussions of techniques, news, and professional competition of the Super Smash Bros. games and is used to announce Smash tournaments. Users on the website also discuss tournament rules and create tier lists that rank playable characters in all five games of the Super Smash Bros. series.

== History ==
Smashboards was founded in 2002 as Smash World by Ricky "Gideon" Tilton. It went on to become one of the largest independent competitive gaming communities in the world.

In September 2008, Major League Gaming acquired Smashboards.com, and in November 2012, Chris "AlphaZealot" Brown, one of the site's moderators, purchased the site from Major League Gaming.

== Projects ==
In 2011, the site's forums were used to collaborate on a user-made PC version of Super Smash Bros. (1999), titled Super Smash Land. Additionally, players frequently discuss the rankings for playable characters and the administrators release forum posts of official tier lists. These lists are generally accepted among community members.
