= SoCal Regionals 2017 =

- 2017

Tournament information
- Sport: Marvel vs. Capcom: Infinite, Street Fighter V, Tekken 7
- Location: Santa Ana, California
- Dates: September 22–24
- Venue: Esports Arena

SoCal Regionals 2017 (sometimes shortened as SCR 2017) was a fighting game event that took place in Santa Ana, California on September 22–24. Held by Level|Up, the event featured eleven tournaments, among which the debut competition of Marvel vs. Capcom: Infinite, one of the Street Fighter V Premier Events of the 2017 Capcom Pro Tour, and a Tekken 7 tournament that was part of the 2017 Tekken World Tour Master.

The Marvel vs. Capcom tournament at SCR 2017 was won by Ryan "FilipinoChamp" Ramirez, while its Street Fighter V tournament was won by Atsushi "Yukadon" Fujimura.

== Background ==
SoCal Regionals 2017 was held at the Anaheim Convention Center in Anaheim, California from September 22 to 24. The event featured eleven tournaments, and a triple main event to close out the show: a Marvel vs. Capcom: Infinite tournament, a Street Fighter V tournament, and a Tekken 7 tournament. SCR 2017 also featured tournaments for Injustice 2, Guilty Gear Xrd Rev 2, BlazBlue: Central Fiction, Under Night In-Birth EXE Late[st], The King of Fighters XIV, Killer Instinct, Pokken Tournament, and Super Street Fighter II Turbo. There was also a three-on-three exhibition match of Dissidia Final Fantasy NT held at the event.

The Marvel vs. Capcom: Infinite tournament was Part of Capcom's "Battle of the Stones" series and, as such, it featured a best of 3 format. As this was the first tournament played for the game, there existed some concern around competitors getting copies of the game early. Regardless, many players carried over habits from the previous game in the series, Ultimate Marvel vs. Capcom 3. After the tournament was concluded, Machinima set up a "Body Count Fighting" tournament with nine announced matches and one "secret" match. Jason Dimberg of Mechinima described the event as "adding two more champions/belt-holders for Marvel Vs. Capcom: Infinite, ... and Tekken 7."

== Tournament summary ==
The first two days of the Marvel vs. Capcom: Infinite tournament at SoCal Regionals was dominated by Richard Nguyen, who, playing with Dante and Dormammu defeated established Marvel vs. Capcom players such as BT Clockwork and former Evo champion NYChrisG. The final top 8 of the tournament was populated by lesser-known players, such as Gabriel "Jibrill" Lam and Robert "Sacktap" Capps. The tournament was won by Ryan "FilipinoChamp" Ramirez, the only "top name" from competitive Marvel vs. Capcom history that reached the finals.

Though the early rounds of the Street Fighter V tournament at SCR 2017 featured much local talent, the top 8 ended up being a highly international affair. Six different characters were played during the finals, though the character choices did not stray far from the norm. The finals were dominated by Japanese player Atsushi "Yukadon" Fujimura, who defeated other players such as Geon "NL" Sim, Hyungsuk "Verloren" Kong, and Saul "MenaRD" Mena.

The Tekken 7 tournament at SCR 2017 was dominated by two Echo Fox members, HyunJin "JDCR" Kim and Choi "Saint" Jinwoo. Though Saint entered the grand finals in the winner's bracket, JDCR, playing with Dragunov, determined the tempo of their match and pressured his opponent through effective spacing and punishments. JDCR forced a bracket reset and defeated Saint again in their second set, winning the tournament.
