= Taunting =

Battle cry, sarcastic remark, gesture, or insult

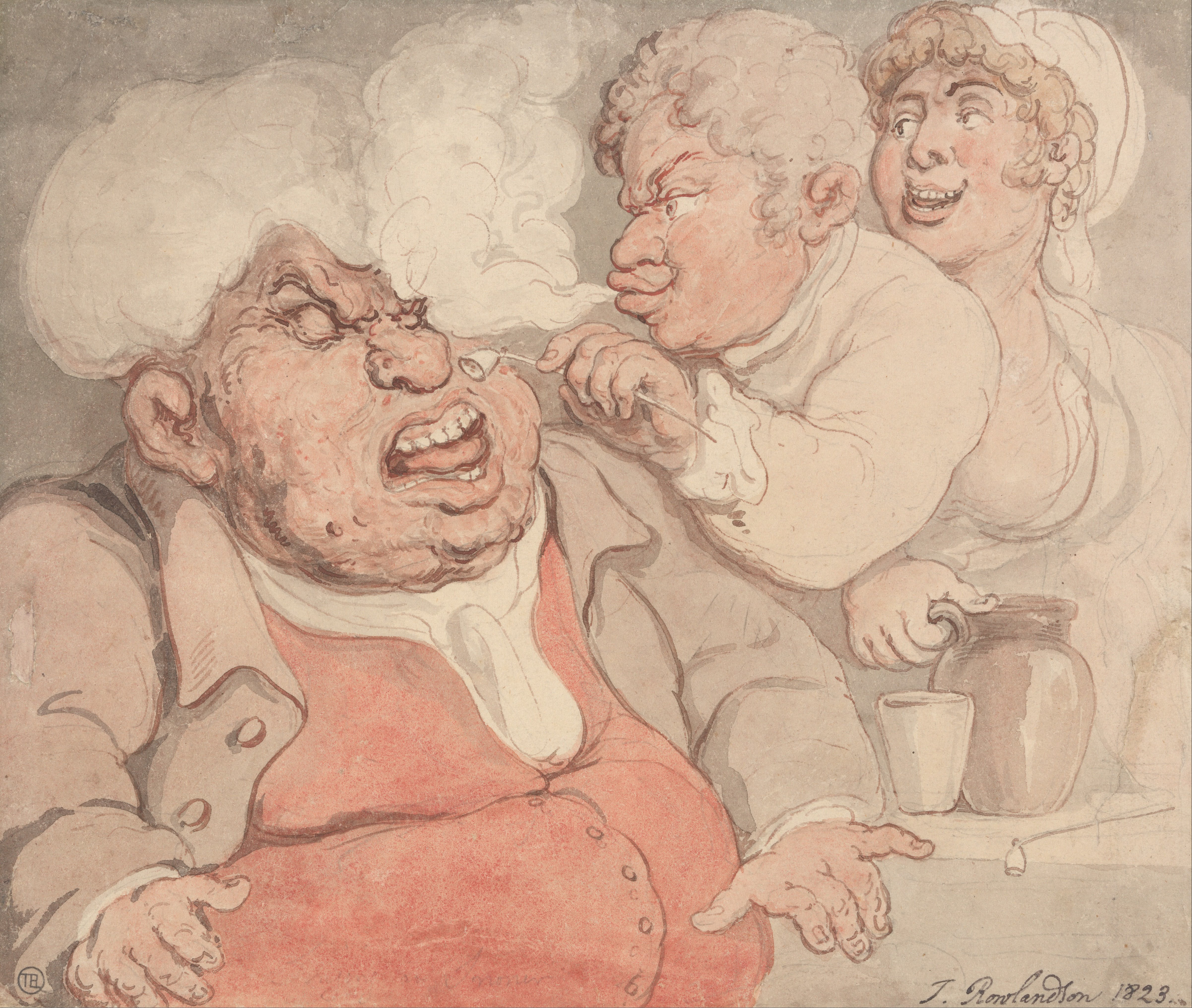
"Taunting with Smoke from a Pipe" by Thomas Rowlandson, 1823

A taunt is a battle cry, sarcastic remark, gesture, or insult intended to demoralize or antagonize the recipient. Taunting can exist as a form of social competition to gain control of the target's cultural capital (i.e., status). In sociological theory, the control of the three social capitals is used to produce an advantage in the social hierarchy, to enforce one's position in relation to others. This can also be used as a tactic to gain advantage of their opponent's irrational reaction. Taunting is committed by either directly or indirectly encouraging others to taunt the target. The target may give a response in kind to maintain status, as in fighting words and trash-talk.

Taunts are also a genre of folklore according to "The Poetic Rites of Conversation," by John H. McDowell, published in the Journal of Folklore Research.

The practice of taunting has a rich historical context, dating back to ancient times. In medieval warfare, for instance, taunting was a common psychological tactic used to provoke enemies or undermine their morale. A notable example of this can be found in the account of the Battle of Agincourt (1415) during the Hundred Years' War. Before the battle, the English and French forces faced each other, exchanging taunts designed to provoke an attack. As recorded by eyewitness accounts, the two armies engaged in verbal sparring, with each side attempting to goad the other into making the first move. This psychological warfare was an integral part of the battle strategy, demonstrating how taunting has long been used as a tool in conflict.

== Verbal taunts ==
The act of taunting can be learned by observation and improvisation. It usually follows linear thought, correlating or building in some manner to the target of taunting. Things such as the victim's appearance, intelligence, mannerisms, education, background, past offenses, etc. can otherwise be insulted. When used in this manner, the effectiveness of a taunt at provoking a response varies depending on how the specific insult relates to its victim (or their sense of self), to what level of offense they regard the taunt, and how well the victim can control their emotions when responding.

Taunts may be expressed in song. In the Eastern U.S. and Britain, the chant "Nyah nyah nyah nyah nyah nyah", sung to the tune of "Bye, baby Bunting" is an insult among children. In the American South, this is often used as "Nanny nanny boo-boo" and repeated with words such as "You ca-an't catch me". In Hebrew, the taunt is "Na na, banana" or "Na-na-na banana" (means the same as in English). In French, the taunt uses syllables often rendered "Nananananère", and Swedish-speaking children use the phrase "Du kan inte ta mig" ("You cannot catch me"). There are several passages in the Hebrew Bible which have been described as "taunt-songs" or taunting songs, such as Isaiah 14:4-8, Habakkuk 2:6-8, and Zechariah 11:1-3.

== Gestures ==
Certain movements of one's body are, in many cultures, interpreted as a taunt. These can be expressed through the eyes, hands, fingers, head and other areas of the body.

=== Akanbe ===
A gesture in Japanese culture, made by pulling a lower eyelid down to expose the red underneath.

=== Clenched fist ===
A raised, clenched fist is used as a gesture of defiance by a number of groups. It is usually considered to be hostile, yet without any sexual, scatological, or notionally offensive connotations. It is believed to have originally been used in the early 20th century as a popular democratic symbol.

=== Crotch-grab ===
The crotch-grab is done almost exclusively by males. It is, as the name suggests, a grabbing (or one-handed cupping and lifting) of the penis and testicles – usually through clothing. In Italy the sign is by no means purely a taunt, being also an apotropaic gesture of considerable antiquity employed, since the days of Ancient Rome, to ward off the evil eye or bad luck and also to attract good luck. It is, in this context, an invocation of the benign powers of fertility embodied in the male genitalia and, as such, lies at the root of the magical intent expressed symbolically in the fascinum and probably also the cornicello. Despite recent rulings by the Italian legal system, the (public) crotch-grab is still used by some Italian men as a means of deflecting the ill-luck threatened by objects or people related to death and burial and (more esoterically) the unlucky number 17 (said to be unlucky because it a) resembles a man hanging from a gibbet and b) because when written XVII in Roman numerals is an anagram of 'vixi' – 'I lived', a verb form considered unlucky because of its frequent occurrence in ancient Roman funerary inscriptions).

=== Cutthroat ===
The cutthroat gesture is performed by drawing the hand, or a finger (usually the thumb) or two, across the throat. It represents slitting the throat with a knife, and means that the gesturee or someone else is metaphorically being killed. It is rarely if ever used literally to refer to death (and when the whole hand is used, it is usually a benign signal to stop or pause something), though it is occasionally used as a theatrical threat ("I'm going to kill you"). The gesture earned a great deal of national notoriety in the NFL during the 1999 season in which several players did the cutthroat gesture.

=== Middle finger ===
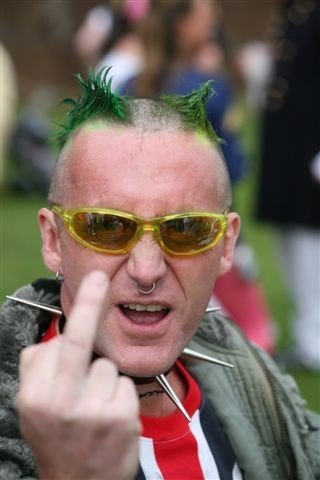
"The finger" gesture

The finger gesture or "middle finger" is a gesture consisting of a fist with the middle finger extended, optionally extending the thumb as well. It is equivalent to the phrase "fuck you" due to its resemblance to the penis. It is thousands of years old, being referred to in Ancient Roman literature as the digitus infamis or digitus impudicus. Performing this gesture is also referred to as "flipping the bird", which is a combination of slang derived from the 1860s expression "give the big bird" (to hiss at someone like a goose) and the 1960s "up yours" hand gesture. In some regions, "flipping the bird" refers to the V sign instead.

=== Loser ===
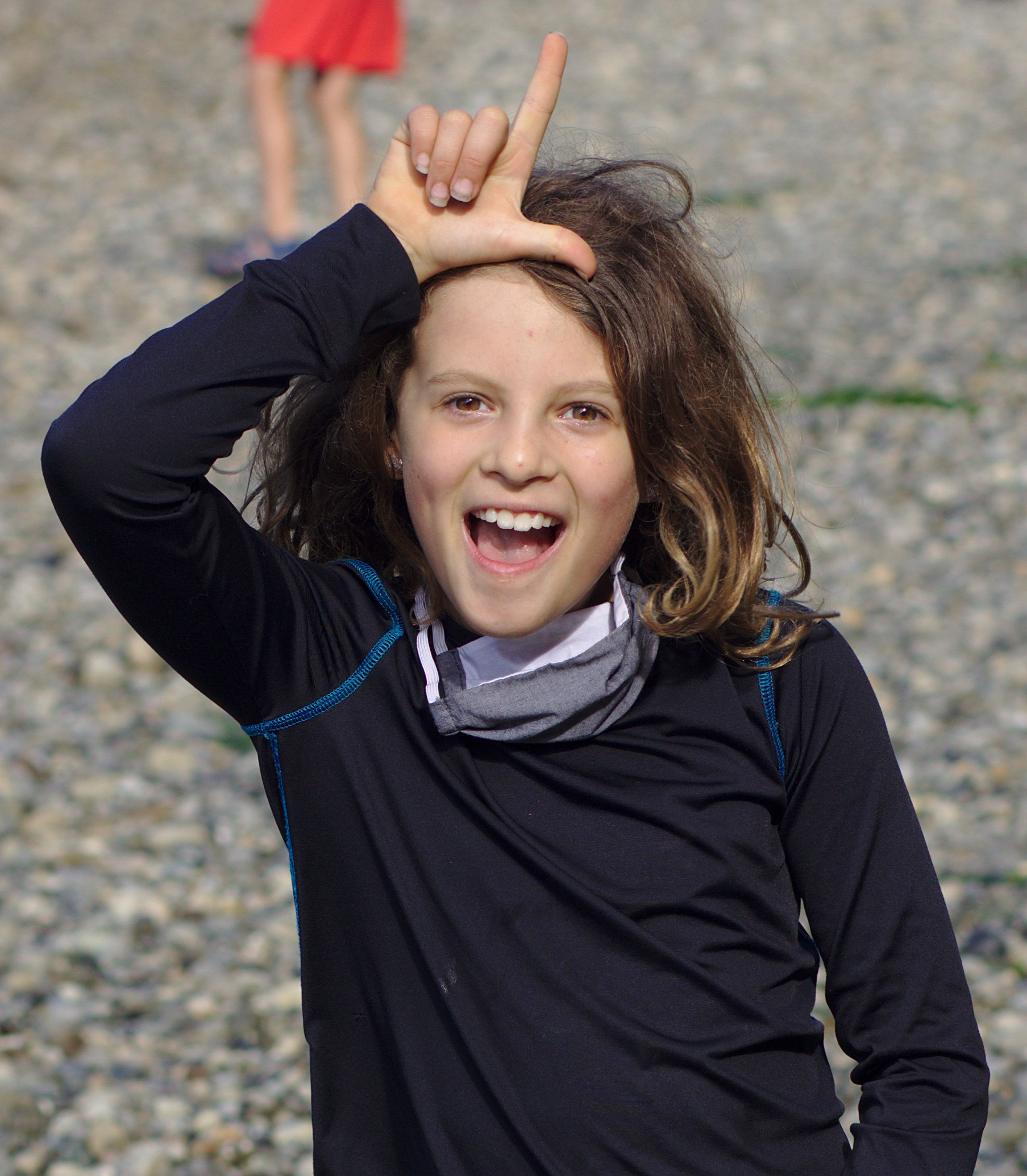
Child making the loser gesture

The "loser" gesture used in some countries is performed by raising the index finger and thumb of one's right hand perpendicular to each other and then placing them on one's forehead with index finger pointing upward. So placed, the fingers form the letter "L" from the perspective of a viewer and signify the name-calling insult "loser" directed toward the person being spoken to or spoken about. The gesture can also be performed in combination with a dancing by placing the "L" shape on one's head, grabbing one's crotch, and hopping from one foot to another. This gesture was created in early 2018 as a purchasable emote "Take the L" in the video game Fortnite. It became such a problem that Epic Games, developers of Fortnite, were forced to add a setting to "disable confrontational emotes" in April 2024.

=== Shocker ===
Done by holding up the hand with the index, middle and pinky finger, implying the act of putting two fingers in a woman's vagina and one in her anus.

=== Tongue ===
Often sticking one's tongue out at another is seen as mocking the other. A variation of this is also known as blowing a raspberry. It can also be wagged in a manner suggesting cunnilingus, which is usually seen as highly vulgar.

=== Thumbing one's nose ===
A person thumbing their nose

Thumbing one's nose (also known as cocking a snook) is the act of placing the end of the thumb on one's nose, and wiggling the extended fingers. The gesture is directed towards a person as an act of derision.

=== V sign ===
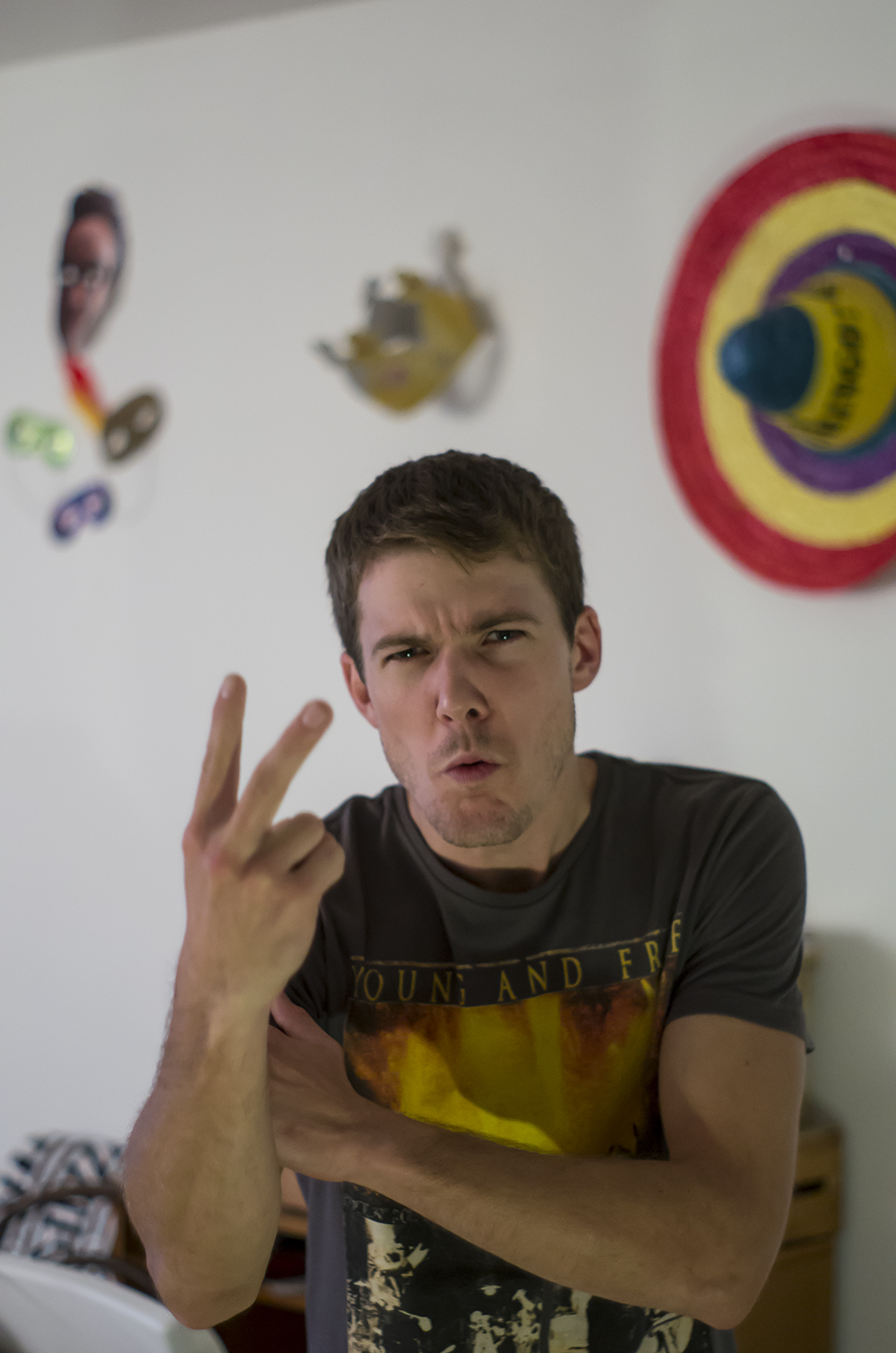
The V sign

The insulting version of the gesture (with the palm inwards) is often compared to the offensive gesture known as "the finger". The "two-fingered salute", as it is also known, is commonly performed by flicking the V upwards from wrist or elbow. The V sign, when the palm is facing toward the person giving the sign, has long been an insulting gesture in England, and later in the rest of the United Kingdom; its use is largely restricted to the UK, Ireland, Australia, and New Zealand. It is frequently used to signify defiance (especially to authority), contempt or derision.

=== Wanker ===
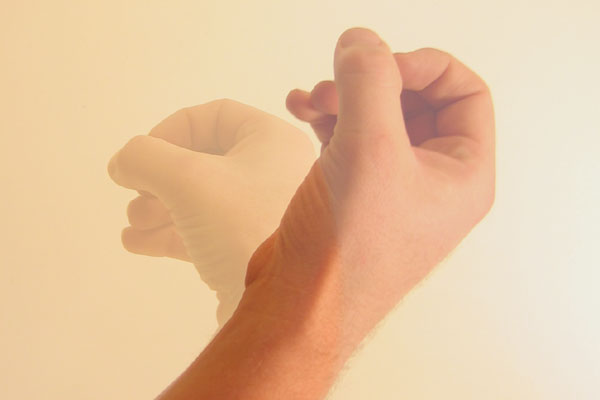
The Wanker gesture

The wanker gesture is made with a loose fist (with all fingers forming a cylindrical shape), and shaken up and down (or sometimes, back and forth) at the wrist, suggesting masturbation. A picture of the young Tony Blair, later the British Prime Minister (1997–2007), using the wanker gesture became widely available (although copyrighted) in 2007.

== In popular culture ==
In the 1975 Monty Python film Monty Python and the Holy Grail, the French Knight taunts King Arthur and his companions with a series of increasingly ludicrous insults, culminating in "Your mother was a hamster and your father smelt of elderberries".

Versions of the Endemol quiz show 1 vs. 100 based on the United States version (Australia, and to an extent, France) are known for the contestants and mob taunting each other.

Similar game shows, such as Weakest Link, are built on taunting a defeated player.

=== Video games ===
Some multiplayer video games feature the ability to taunt a human opponent, using purpose-programmed dialog and gestures to show dominance. In games not featuring a dedicated "taunt" command, players have devised other ways, using the controls of the game, to taunt or harass opponents. In multiplayer FPS games, players may taunt a defeated opponent by corpse humping or tea bagging them, repeating the game's "crouch" command above the dead player's body. In shooter games which allow melee attacks, a common way of taunting opponents is to kill them without using a gun.

In the EA Sports UFC mixed martial arts series, taunting is a part of the in-game fight mechanics, using real-life gestures and moves performed by actual UFC fighters to add a psychological layer to the combat.

== See also ==
- Insult
- Jibe
- Sarcasm
- Social psychology
- Teasing
- The dozens
- Trash-talk
- Fighting words
- Goon baiting
