= Snake Eyez =

American esports player

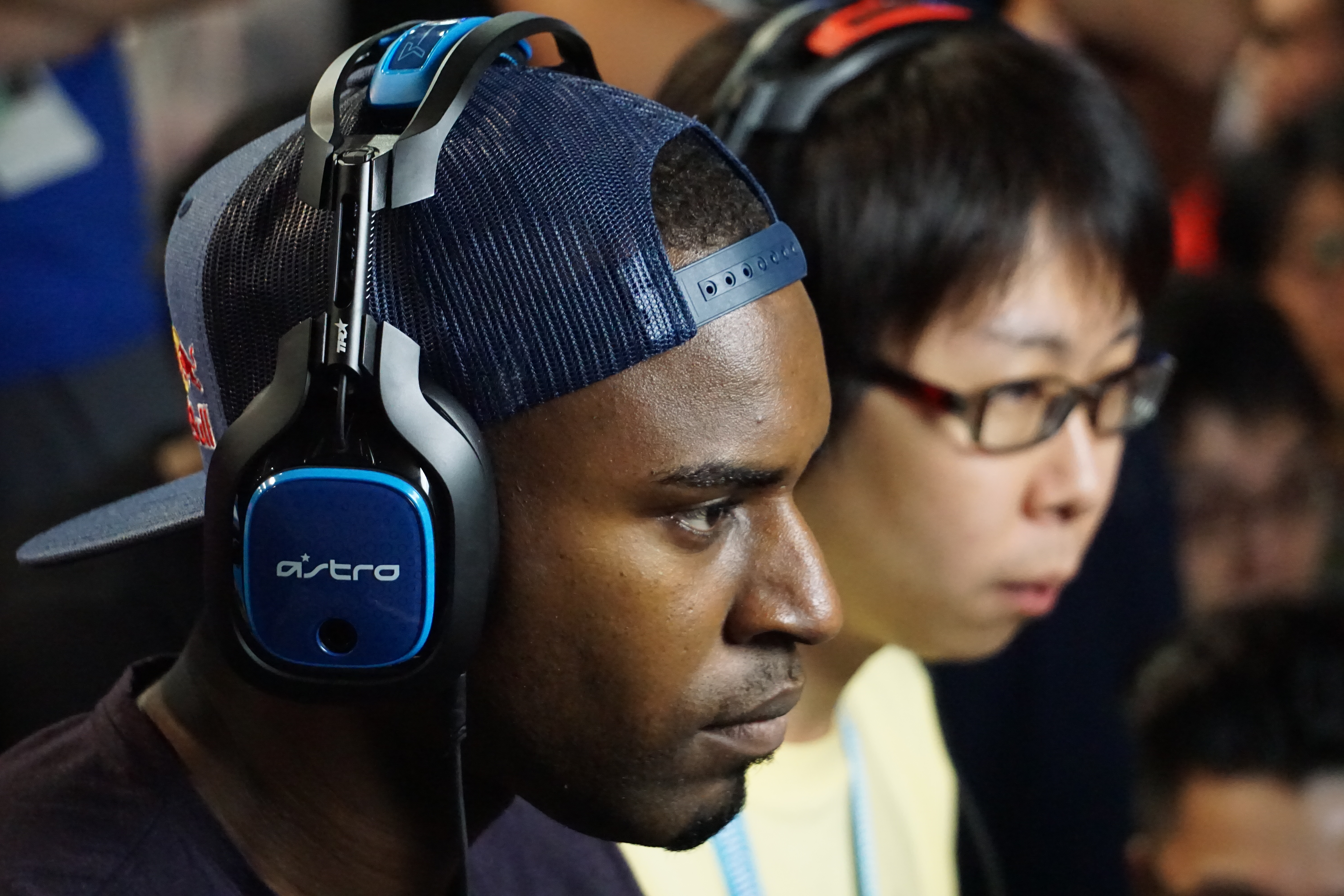
- Snake Eyez (left) at Evo 2016

Personal information
- Name: Darryl S. Lewis
- Born: 1988 or 1989 (age 37–38)
- Nationality: American

Career information
- Games: Street Fighter series
- Playing career: 2010–present

Team history
- 2012–2013: AfterGlow Elite
- 2014: Revolution Gaming
- 2015–2020: Red Bull

Career highlights and awards
- EVO champion (2010)

Darryl S. Lewis, better known by his in-game name Snake Eyez, is an American professional fighting game player. He is considered one of the best Zangief players of Street Fighter IV and Street Fighter V. Lewis was the highest seeded player at Capcom Cup 2015 who wasn't automatically qualified. He was the only American player in top-8 of Capcom Cup 2015. Snake Eyez's career was the subject of a documentary called Cultivation: House of Snake Eyez.

Snake Eyez is also well known for being the EVO 2010 Super Street Fighter II Turbo HD Remix champion, in which he also plays Zangief.

== Tournament results ==
=== 2010 ===
- 1st - Evolution 2010 (Super Street Fighter II Turbo HD Remix)

=== 2012 ===
- 5th - Street Fighter 25th Anniversary Grand Finals (Super Street Fighter IV: Arcade Edition v2012)

=== 2013 ===
- 5th - Winter Brawl 7 (Super Street Fighter IV: Arcade Edition v2012)
- 9th - Evolution 2013 (Super Street Fighter IV: Arcade Edition v2012)
- 4th - LANHAMMER 2013 (Super Street Fighter IV: Arcade Edition v2012)
- 5th - Shadowloo Showdown 2013 (Super Street Fighter IV: Arcade Edition v2012)

=== 2014 ===
- 4th - SoCal Regionals 2014 (Super Street Fighter IV: Arcade Edition v2012)
- 7th - NorCal Regionals 2014 (Super Street Fighter IV: Arcade Edition v2012)
- 5th - CEO 2014 (Ultra Street Fighter IV)
- 4th - Evolution 2014 (Ultra Street Fighter IV)
- 1st - Capcom Pro Tour San Diego Comic-Con (Ultra Street Fighter IV)
- 4th - West Coast Warzone 4 (Ultra Street Fighter IV)
- 1st - West Coast Warzone 4 (Super Street Fighter II Turbo)
- 1st - The Fall Classic 2014 (Ultra Street Fighter IV)
- 1st - Absolute Battle 5 (Ultra Street Fighter IV)
- 3rd - Northeast Championships 15 (Ultra Street Fighter IV)
- 13th - Capcom Cup 2014 (Ultra Street Fighter IV)
- 5th - Hadocon VI (Ultra Street Fighter IV)

=== 2015 ===
- 2nd - Apex 2015 (Ultra Street Fighter IV)
- 1st - Winter Brawl 9 (Ultra Street Fighter IV)
- 7th - Final Round 18 (Ultra Street Fighter IV)
- 9th - Red Bull Kumite 2015 (Ultra Street Fighter IV)
- 2nd - Texas Showdown 2015 (Ultra Street Fighter IV)
- 1st - SoCal Regionals Prelude I (Ultra Street Fighter IV)
- 1st - Hadocon VII (Ultra Street Fighter IV)
- 13th - Evolution 2015 (Ultra Street Fighter IV)
- 4th - EGL Dallas 10K (Ultra Street Fighter IV)
- 2nd - Summer Jam 9 (Ultra Street Fighter IV)
- 2nd - First Attack 2015 (Ultra Street Fighter IV)
- 1st - The Fall Classic 2015 (Ultra Street Fighter IV)
- 33rd - Mad Catz Tokyo Game Show 2015 (Ultra Street Fighter IV)
- 5th - SoCal Regionals 2015 (Ultra Street Fighter IV)
- 2nd - Defend the North 2015 (Ultra Street Fighter IV)
- 5th - Canada Cup 2015 (Ultra Street Fighter IV)
- 1st - Canada Cup 2015 (Super Street Fighter II Turbo)
- 5th - Capcom Cup 2015 (Ultra Street Fighter IV)

=== 2017 ===
- 2nd - Combo Breaker 2017 (Street Fighter V)
- 2nd - Texas Showdown (Street Fighter V)
- 1st - CEO 2017 (Street Fighter V)

=== 2023 ===
- 1st - Texas Showdown 2023 (Guilty Gear Strive)
- 1st - Capcom Pro Tour 2023 - US/Canada West (Street Fighter 6)
