= Academic grading in Japan =

In Japan, each school has a different grading system. Many universities use the following set of categories:

Grade in Japanese (Kanji)	English translation	Corresponding percentage	4-scale university
shū (秀)	Exemplary, excellent	S (90–100%), rarely given	
yū (優)	Very good	A (80–89%)	A (80–100%)
ryō (良)	Good	B (70–79%)	B (70–79%)
ka (可)	Average, pass	C (60–69%)	C (60–69%)
nin (認) (Note: Nin or gō (合) is sometimes used in the event of passing without grading, such as through credit transfer.)	Approved, acceptable	D/F (50–59%), uncommon	D/F (50–59%), uncommon
fuka (不可)	Unacceptable, failed	F (0–59% or 0–49%)	F (0–59% or 0–49%)

Education in Japan has many different ways of approaching their grading system.

Public schooling below the high school level is classified as compulsory education (義務教育, gimu-kyōiku), and every Japanese child is required to attend school until they pass middle school. An interesting phenomenon is that even if an individual student fails a course, they may pass with their class regardless of grades on tests. The grades on tests have no effect on schooling until taking entrance exams to get into high school.

Japanese children's report cards are primarily influenced by behavior rather than grades. For example, Japanese students are graded by the greetings they use, if they remember their supplies, and how they treat plants and animals.

== High school level ==
In order to attend high school in Japan, younger students must pass an entrance exam. If they do not pass, they are not allowed to go to high school.

Parents often send their children to cram schools (塾, juku) or private schools for test training purposes.

Most high schools in Japan have a numerical grading system from 5 to 1, with 5 being the highest grade and 1 being the lowest.

== University level ==
Like the high school level, Japanese students must pass a standardized test to be accepted into a university.

Most national universities employ a four-rank grading system (only with A, B, C and F). Below-average students are given an F, and are encouraged to retake the same subject(s) in the following semesters.

GPA is a simple numerical representation of college results in Japan. As of 2014, 497 Japanese universities use this system.

For universities, graduation requires a minimum of 124 credits and the required number of credits for each university. To earn 1 credit, 45 hours of study time is required, including preparation and review time.
