= Tier list =

Ranked list originating in video game culture

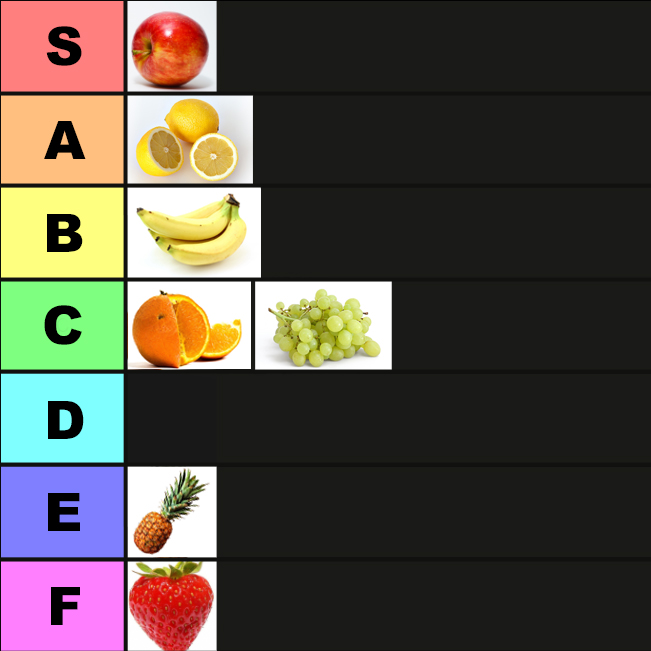
An example of a tier list, subjectively ranking fruits. Higher tiers represent a more favorable ranking. The letters are inspired by grading in education, especially in Japanese culture, which may include an 'S' grade.

A tier list is a ranking system where items are subjectively arranged in tiers from the best to worst. The concept originated in video game culture where playable characters or other in-game elements are ranked by their tournament viability. In addition to video game elements, tier lists have been used to rank items from other subjects, such as films, sports teams, logos, animals, and tabletop games. The purpose of a tier list is usually to give room for discussion in the subject, to create an easily understandable overview, or simply to entertain.

Tier lists are a popular method of classifying the cast of playable characters in fighting games such as the Tekken and Super Smash Bros. series; multiplayer online battle arena titles such as League of Legends and Dota series; hero shooter titles such as Overwatch and Apex Legends; and action role-playing games with playable party members like Genshin Impact.

== Methodology ==
Items listed high on a tier list are considered better compared to the items arranged on the lower tiers. For example, video game characters at the top of a tier list of a specific game are considered to be powerful compared to lower-scoring characters, and are therefore more likely to be used in high-level competitive settings like tournaments.

When a competitive game gets an update, a question that arises is how the changes in the game will affect the tier list. Even when no balancing changes actually took place, the inclusion of new characters or new systems can affect tier lists. In fighting games, the strength of a character is always held relative to that of other characters, meaning that something that is strong in one fighting game does not necessarily have to be strong in another. The metagame may shift over time as dominant strategies get overturned using less popular characters.

Tier rankings may use letter grades. The competitive community surrounding Guilty Gear Xrd, for instance, ranks characters as 'S', 'S-', 'A+', and 'A', where 'S tiers' are particularly powerful and 'A tiers' less so. Major video game news websites such as The Daily Dot, Kotaku and PC Gamer have published their own tier lists for popular games. 'S' tier may stand for "special", "super", or the Japanese word for "exemplary" (秀, shū), and originates from the widespread use in Japanese culture of an 'S' grade for advertising and academic grading.

For a game like Super Smash Bros. Melee, which was released in 2001 and has not been updated since, but is still popular in tournament settings, characters originally overpowered tend to remain that way, due to their inability to receive character-balancing updates. However, characters initially believed to be poor can climb in later tier lists if new techniques are discovered that improve their viability. Different versions of the game may have different tier lists as well. The website Smashboards bases its yearly tier lists for the Super Smash Bros. series on polling results.

== Impact ==
Writing for Kotaku, Maddy Myers noted that characters that are considered low-tier have an advantage over higher-tiered characters, as players have less experience dealing with low-tier characters and often underestimate them. Myers stated that "the element of surprise can only get you so far, but it's still an undeniable asset. And one that the bottom third of every tier list enjoys." Already popular characters may also rise in tier lists because high-level players establish and iterate on their combos and techniques. Myers also noted that tier lists are less useful in team-based games, because character roles and team composition introduce a complex set of variables.

An iceberg chart about several topics related to Wikipedia

A popular variant of the tier list is the "iceberg chart", which ranks items not from best to worst, but from the most commonly known to the most obscure. These charts place items on an illustration of an iceberg, with well-known items at the iceberg's tip and lesser-known ones deep below the water's surface. Iceberg charts were popularized around 2020.
