= Teabagging =

Sexual act

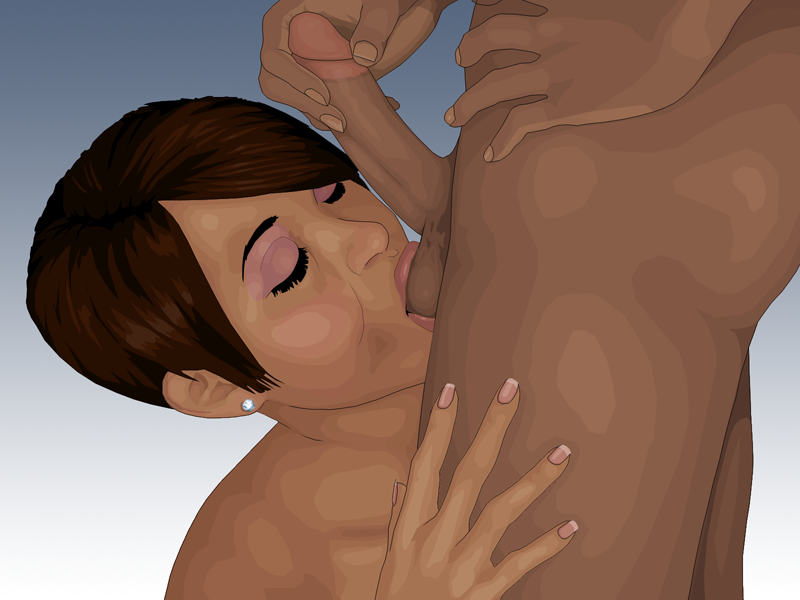
A woman and man participating in teabagging

Teabagging is a slang term for the sexual act involving placing the scrotum into the mouth of a sexual partner for sexual pleasure, or onto the face or head of another person, sometimes as a comedic device.

The name of the practice, when it is done in a repeated in-and-out motion, is derived from its passing resemblance to the dipping of a tea bag into a cup of hot water as a method of brewing tea. As a form of non-penetrative sex, it can be done for its own enjoyment or as foreplay.

== Oral sex ==
Along with the penis, the scrotum is sensitive and considered to be an erogenous zone. This makes varying degrees of stimulation an integral part of oral sex. And while some may enjoy the stimulation, not everyone responds to it. Sex experts have suggested various techniques that the performer can use during fellatio to increase their partner's pleasure. These include gently sucking and tugging on the scrotum and use of lips to ensure minimal contact with their teeth. It has also been recommended as a form of foreplay or safer sex. It presents a low risk of transmission for many diseases, including HIV.

Its gain in prominence has been attributed to its depiction in the 1998 film Pecker, directed by John Waters. It has since become popular enough with couples to be discussed during an episode of the television series Sex and the City.

Sex and relationship experts have varying definitions on how the act is performed. According to columnist Dan Savage, the person whose scrotum is being stimulated is known as "the teabagger" and the one giving the stimulation is "the teabaggee": "A teabagger dips sack; a teabaggee receives dipped sack." Some consider the act to be as simple as fellatio involving the scrotum. Others consider the position to involve the man squatting over his reclined partner while the testicles are repeatedly raised and lowered into the mouth. Whether licking and fondling is considered teabagging was once debated on The Howard Stern Show.

== In video games ==
Teabagging in video games involves a player character rapidly and repeatedly crouching over the corpse of another player-controlled character as a form of humiliation or to provoke the other player. The practice likely originated from multiplayer communities in games such as Quake or Counter-Strike, and it became more prominent in later first-person shooter games like Halo: Combat Evolved. The use of teabagging is now widespread in video game culture, although some gamers consider it to be an act of bad sportsmanship or harassment.

The act courted much controversy across June and July 2022 when two professional female Valorant players received suspensions by Riot Games for criticizing people who had compared the act to sexual assault. In addition to the suspensions, the players were also doxxed. The suspensions caused outrage in much of the Valorant and wider internet community, with various commentators calling the comparison to real-world sexual violence as "out of control" and "absurd".

The player known as Dawn, who received a three-month suspension for voicing her opinion, said of the situation: "I have watched [sexual assault] happen in broad daylight. It is not something you can compare to crouching in a video game. I was visibly upset by this, as were hundreds of thousands of people, and replied under her thread expressing my frustrations and concerns."

== Controversy ==
=== Social ridicule and harassment ===
When teabagging is carried out non-consensually, such as when it is done as a practical joke, it is legally considered sexual assault or sexual battery. It has been practiced during hazing or bullying incidents, with reports including groups holding down victims while the perpetrator "shoved his testicles in [the victim's] face" or puts his "crotch to his head".

== See also ==
- Kanchō
- Swaffelen
