= Lorena Peril =

American singer

- Lorena Peril is holding the microphone and singing as she performs with the dancers of the revue Fantasy at Luxor Las Vegas in August 2024.
- Born: San Francisco, California, U.S.
- Education: Skyline College
- Occupation: Singer
- Years active: c. 2001–present
- Spouse: Ray Jon Narbaitz III
- Website: lorenaperilofficial.com

Lorena Peril (born December 21) is an American singer. She is the lead vocalist for the topless revue Fantasy at Luxor Las Vegas and frequently performs the United States national anthem at sporting events.

Born in San Francisco, Peril graduated from Oceana High School in 1993 or 1994 and attended Skyline College. Starting at 18 years old, she worked for four years as a housekeeper at a nursing home in San Francisco and later as an administrative assistant in the Financial District. On a family vacation on a Carnival Cruise Line ship, she sang karaoke during an open mic. The cruise director urged her to apply for a role as a production singer. Peril sang for Carnival Cruise Line for over four years. On a friend's recommendation, she moved to Las Vegas in 2005 to seek job opportunities there after wanting a change from the cruise ship life. In mid-2005, Peril became the lead vocalist for the rock musical group Sunset Strip, which later became the show Sin City Bad Girls at the Las Vegas Hilton. She performed as Christina Aguilera in Stratosphere's tribute show American Superstars between 2007 and 2009 and in Sin City Bad Girls until 2010.

Peril became the lead vocalist and host of Fantasy between 2010 and 2013. She left in 2013 to perform as Sandy in a European tour of the musical Grease. On her return to Las Vegas, she was a lead vocalist in 2014 in the David Saxe production Vegas! The Show at Planet Hollywood. Peril left Las Vegas again to star in 2015 and 2016 with her husband in the cabaret production Married and Looking in Puerto Vallarta, Mexico. When she returned to Las Vegas, Peril started her second stint as lead vocalist of Fantasy in 2016. Reviewers of Fantasy praised her strong vocals, comedic stage presence, and ability to make the audience feel at ease. Peril created and starred in the 2023 musical production Housekeeper To Headliner about her life story.

== Early life ==
Lorena Peril was born on December 21 in San Francisco and is of Mexican–American heritage. Her mother is Ofelia Baker and her father is Barry Baker. She has a younger brother, Marco Anguiano. In her early childhood, Peril lived in poverty in the Mission District of San Francisco with her single mother, a housekeeper born in Guadalajara. By the time, she was nine years old, she had a stepfather. That Christmas, her Christmas gift was a card telling her she would be visiting Disneyland. Peril said, "I screamed and cried and jumped up and down for 20 minutes. I thought only rich people went to Disneyland."

As a child, Peril gathered her family members to watch her imitate vocalists and dancers she admired. She played songs by Linda Ronstadt, who she said had a profound effect on her. When Peril was 15 years old, her father, Barry, purchased a karaoke system for her. Peril performed songs from Mariah Carey, Celine Dion, Sheena Easton, and Barbra Streisand. In her youth, she and her family frequently visited Fisherman's Wharf in San Francisco where she took trolleys and ate cotton candy. Upon graduating from Pacific Heights Middle School in Pacifica, she attended Oceana High School, where she graduated in 1993 or 1994. (Note: For her graduation from Pacific Heights Middle School; Sources given different dates for when she graduated from high school: For her graduation from Oceana High School in 1993; For her graduation from high school in 1994) She described her high school self as "the quiet, insecure shy girl" who was "thin and tiny" and given the nickname Olive Oyl. After high school graduation, she studied at Skyline College.

== Career ==
=== Early career: housekeeper and Carnival Cruise Line ===
As she attended night school at a business college, Peril was a housekeeper at Arden Wood Christian Science Nursing Care, a nursing home in San Francisco. She recalled, "I would just sing while pushing the cart, knocking on doors. Just sing while scrubbing the toilets." Beginning when she was 18 years old, Peril was employed there for four years, alongside her mother. Her shift was between 7:00 am and 3:00 pm. Phil Serrano, a guitarist who also worked at the facility, heard her singing and proposed that they team up to play at local venues in the city. They founded the musical group the Perilous Partners. Peril, who was accustomed to mariachi and bubblegum pop, picked up classic rock, rhythm and blues, and soul music. The duo rehearsed songs like "Blue Bayou" and "Crazy" and entertained audiences at tiny clubs and taverns. Peril later said she was not fond of the group's name because she thought it evoked an insurance company. After a four-year stint at the nursing home, Peril switched jobs, moving to an employer in the Financial District to be an administrative assistant.

Peril boarded a Carnival Cruise Line ship for a vacation with her family in 1999. Her mother suggested that she participate in the karaoke during the cruise's second evening. She sang "(You Make Me Feel Like) A Natural Woman" at the open mic, where she received a standing ovation from the audience. The cruise director praised her performance, advising her to become a professional vocalist in production shows. Peril created a performance demonstration on a ship kiosk which she sent to Carnival. The cruise director gave her Carnival Cruise Line contact details and told her to "use my name". Six months afterwards, Peril got a call to audition in Los Angeles. She became the main singer during their evening performances and her first contract was on the Carnival Paradise. Responsible for doing two shows every week, Peril spent over four years performing on cruise ships, where she sang and danced.

=== Move to Las Vegas: Sin City Bad Girls and American Superstars ===
George Bryant, a drummer in her supporting band on the Carnival Cruise Line ship, recommended that Peril become an entertainer in Las Vegas, where he hailed from. When she vacationed in Las Vegas, Peril yearned for a change from the cruise ship life, so she moved to Las Vegas in 2005 to pursue her career there. Peril said, "I could always come back (to Carnival), but I didn't want to keep jumping from ship to ship." She was unemployed and lived on the east side of the Las Vegas Strip at a Tropicana Avenue Motel 6. Peril secured her first Las Vegas role at a Mandalay Bay band. In mid-2005, at the Las Vegas Hilton's Shimmer Cabaret, she received a job to become the lead vocalist for the rock musical group Sunset Strip which later became the show Sin City Bad Girls. During the topless revue, Peril sang the Police song "Roxanne", the Gretchen Wilson song "All Jacked Up", and the Christina Aguilera song "Nasty Naughty Boy". Mike Weatherford of the Las Vegas Review-Journal praised Peril's performance on "Roxanne" but found that her vocal style did not match the country song "All Jacked Up". Following a 2007 performance where Peril sang "Beautiful", a spectator from George J. Maloof Jr.'s group threw a $1,000 casino chip to express praise. After Barry Manilow watched a performance, he recruited the musical group to be his opening act while he toured on the East Coast. Along with the group's seven other members, Peril toured for 10 days. For over a year, Peril starred in Sin City Bad Girls until it closed on July 25, 2010.

Her performances attracted notice from the people producing Stratosphere's tribute show American Superstars, who recruited her to join. Peril attributed her ability to purchase a home to the show, the first in which people paid to watch her perform. She starred on the show between 2007 and 2009. Over the course of her two years on the show, Peril performed six evenings per week in two productions every evening. She imitated Christina Aguilera in American Superstars. To prepare herself for the role, Peril closely examined Aguilera's habits and slightly oversang. According to the Las Vegas Review-Journal's John Katsilometes, Peril adopted Aguilera's unique performance style and closely imitated her singing skills, almost losing her own individuality in the process. Aguilera songs she performed were "Ain't No Other Man", "Beautiful", "Dirrty", and "Lady Marmalade".

=== Fantasy and Grease ===
Peril became the primary singer in Fantasy, a topless revue at Luxor Las Vegas, in 2010. Although other performers in the show go topless, Peril does not. She said when males inquire why, she answers, "Would you even be listening to me if I was singing a ballad topless?" Peril had a prior connection to Fantasy from auditioning there five years prior. In 2005, Peril had responded to an Internet advertisement to be a substitute singer on Fantasy. Impressed by Peril's skill, Fantasy producer Anita Mann thought that Peril should be performing regularly rather than filling in only the one day a week that the primary performer, Stephanie Dianna Sanchez, was on break. Mann committed to remembering Peril should a regular spot in the show become available. By 2010, the Fantasy lead vocalist Angelica Bridges had wanted to reduce her commitment to Fantasy, while around the same time, Peril was finishing her time with Sin City Bad Girls, which was concluding its run. Peril reached out to Mann in July 2010 and was offered the role of host and lead vocalist starting on August 1, 2010. Las Vegas Review-Journal columnist Mike Weatherford found that Peril's addition shifted the show to an energetic pop style containing Latin elements. He thought that the topless scenes, which she did not participate in, felt "a little less hot and bothered". In one scene, she chooses an audience member to wear an Elvis Presley outfit and lip sync and lightly mocks male sex organs. Las Vegas Weekly reviewer John Katsilometes lauded her rendition of the Shakira song "Hips Don't Lie" alongside comedian Sean E. Cooper. According to Katsilometes, Peril's commanding and versatile voice, combined with her captivating demeanor, made her ideally suited to captivate spectators. In her first stint on Fantasy, she performed her last show on July 22, 2013.

Peril tried out for season 1 of The Voice on April 14, 2011, in Burbank, California. Since the television series' producer Mark Burnett had listened to Peril's singing and believed she could be successful on the show, the casting directors urged her to try out. She sang "Proud Mary" and received a standing ovation, but she was not chosen to proceed because all of the judges did not turn their seats around to select her. According to Peril, Christina Aguilera gave her the feedback, "I felt like you were over-singing a little." Peril declined an opportunity to try out on The Voice's second season because she preferred performing in Fantasy.

Peril was given the opportunity in April 2013 to take on the role of Sandy in the musical Grease. Her husband, Ray Jon Narbaitz, was offered the role of Vince Fontaine in the same production. Peril received the position without needing to audition. The director, Bart Doerfler, gave her it after Peril previously had used an Italian accent to sing "The Italian" for his European show Speed. Peril left Fantasy in 2013 to star in the tour. Put on by the Belgian company Music Hall, Grease the Arena Tour was set to debut on December 21, 2013, and was performed in the European countries of Belgium, France, Germany, Italy, the Netherlands, and the United Kingdom. Tens of thousands of people watched the show. To prepare for her character, Peril straightened her hair and wore hair extensions. After the Grease production ended, Peril returned to Las Vegas, where she and her husband performed at the Rush Lounge in the hotel and casino Golden Nugget in downtown Las Vegas. Las Vegas Sun reviewer John Katsilometes described the couple's performance as "musically impressive and comically smart-ass tandem" and reminiscent of the musical duo Sonny & Cher. Peril began performing in August 2014 in Vegas! The Show, a show produced by David Saxe in the Saxe Theater at Planet Hollywood's Miracle Mile Shops. Peril was an additional vocalist for the show rather than a replacement for someone leaving. She was in the show for one year and periodically substituted for Jaime Lynch, the primary vocalist of Fantasy.

=== Married and Looking and return to Fantasy ===
Peril and her husband, Ray Jon Narbaitz, were performing at the Golden Nugget in downtown Las Vegas when they were visited by Nathan Frye, who had recently become the manager of The Red Room Cabaret in Puerto Vallarta, Mexico. Frye suggested that Peril and Narbaitz headline a show in The Red Cabaret. After declining a Las Vegas job opportunity, the couple accepted his offer and began performing the cabaret production Married and Looking in 2015 and 2016. Narbaitz sang and played his electric guitar. Peril sang, visited the aisle to playfully engage with spectators, and donned a series of alluring costumes. In addition to multiple Spanish songs, Peril sang the Etta James song "At Last", the Susan Tedeschi song "It Hurts So Bad", the Linda Ronstadt song "Blue Bayou", the Shakira song "Hips Don't Lie", and Selena's song "Bidi Bidi Bom Bom". BanderasNews reviewer Debbie White praised the duo's performance, calling them "playful, charming, sweet and a little naughty" and saying Peril "totally captivated" the viewers. While performing in the show, the couple went to the resort town's beach to try to get passersby to purchase tickets. The couple in 2016 created another show, At the Drive In, where they performed songs from well-known movies. The duo returned to The Red Room Cabaret for three shows in 2017. White praised Peril's "powerful" vocals, "dazzling" outfits, and "stunning" theatrical presence.

After six months in Mexico, Peril was finishing up her Married and Looking contract. At producer Anita Mann's request, she began her second stint as Fantasy's lead vocalist after Jaime Lynch withdrew from the role in 2016 to become a recording artist. In a role reversal, Lynch occasionally became Peril's substitute on Mondays which Peril had off. Anita Mann, the show's producer, enlisted the choreographer Mandy Moore to create a new number for Peril. Set to the Justin Timberlake song "Can't Stop the Feeling!", it catered to Peril's sultry and comedic stage presence, the Las Vegas Review-Journal columnist John Katsilometes said. Serving as the presenter, Peril announces the dancers and the different scenes. Peril said that compared to other shows where she was unable to stray from the script, in Fantasy she could speak extemporaneously and bring merriment to the audience. Peril engaged in light-hearted teasing in English and another language, quipping that "the dude sections are always really quiet" and chuckling uproariously at her playful remarks where she declares, "I just snorted. It's on now!" She ventured into the aisle to interact with spectators. The Las Vegas Sun reviewer John Katsilometes called her a "great fit" for Fantasy with her "powerful, rangy voice" and for having an "engaging personality" that smoothly charms spectators. Las Vegas Magazine's Ken Miller found that she has a "bubbly personality and good-natured ribbing" that makes viewers feel at ease.

Terry Bradshaw performed his show Terry Bradshaw: America's Favorite Dumb Blonde … A Life in Four Quarters—featuring him telling stories and singing—for two days in 2013 at The Mirage. Peril was a backing singer and dancer for the show, which Fantasy choreographer Anita Mann directed. She and the three other supporting singers and dancers were dubbed the IQties. Peril performed on the show again in 2019, 2020, and 2021 after it was renamed to The Terry Bradshaw Show and housed in the Atrium Showroom, where Fantasy is performed. Peril performed with Anne Martinez, a Fantasy substitute singer who also sang in Bradshaw's show, in 2022 at the Italian American Club.

=== Housekeeper To Headliner ===
To divert her attention from the COVID-19 pandemic in Nevada, in March 2020, Peril and her neighbors danced outside her home. She took her neighbors' song suggestions on social media and performed the songs. After videos of her were shared on social media, Peril offered to sing for people outside their homes on their birthdays and wedding anniversaries. She traveled that year with her husband Ray Jon Narbaitz to cities in California to perform The Vegas On Wheels Mobile Music and Truckeoke Show. For the show, which had a runtime from 60 to 90 minutes, Peril sang songs on the street. During breaks from singing, she gave an account of her life experiences, which determined how long the production would last. Peril played music from loudspeakers mounted on her husband's truck, a Dodge Ram 1500. One of her stops was the parking lot of San Francisco's Arden Wood Christian Science Nursing Care, where she had been employed for four years starting at 18 years old. The nursing home marketed the show as Housekeeper to Headliner.

During the COVID-19 pandemic, Peril began working on Housekeeper To Headliner, a musical biographical production detailing her story and her ascent to prominence. She described the show as being a combination of Charo and Lucille Ball. As she continued singing six nights every week for Fantasy, Peril spent two months in rehearsals for her new show. Housekeeper To Headliner began being performed at the Smith Center for the Performing Arts on November 1, 2023. The show incorporated audience participation and belly dancing. A band provided live music for the show, which had 13 acts. The band was made up of people she had worked with in Las Vegas. She performed three runs of the show in Puerto Vallarta at Act2PV's Casa Karma Red Room. The production began with a video of Peril doing housekeeping work. As the video finished, she appeared and sang and danced. She performed rock and roll and mariachi songs.

Gabriela Rodriguez of the Las Vegas Weekly said Peril has a "magnetic stage presence and riveting vocals", while the publication's Brock Radke called her "one of the best voices on the Strip".

== National anthem performances ==
Las Vegas Sun columnist John Katsilometes in 2011 called Peril "one of the great national anthem singers in the city". Peril has performed the United States national anthem in multiple settings. When Oscar Goodman, the Mayor of Las Vegas, gave his final State of the City address, she sang the national anthem at the Cleveland Clinic Lou Ruvo Center for Brain Health. She performed it before UNLV Rebels matches held at Thomas & Mack Center and before Las Vegas 51s matches held at Cashman Field. At the Staples Center, Peril sang the national anthem for Los Angeles Clippers and Los Angeles Kings games. She performed the anthem for the San Francisco Giants and Vegas Golden Knights and at T-Mobile Arena for the PBR World Finals.

In her youth, she accompanied her family to San Francisco 49ers games. Peril is a passionate supporter of the team and has a Frank Gore sports jersey. The San Francisco 49ers held a contest in May 2012 where people who had lived in the San Francisco Bay Area could audition to single the national anthem. Five people would be chosen to sing at 49er home games. Over 3,000 people competed by submitting a photo and a recording of them performing the national anthem. The 49ers chose 33 people, including Peril to proceed to the first round. They sang and the 49ers chose 12 top contenders. After another round of singing, Peril was selected to perform during the first home game of the 2012 San Francisco 49ers season. Las Vegas Review-Journal columnist Norm Clarke said Peril's rendition "had the stadium rocking".

Held at the MGM Grand Garden Arena in 2012, the boxing match Manny Pacquiao vs. Juan Manuel Márquez IV was Peril's debut national anthem performance at a primary bout. USA Today said her rendition was "great and had the crowd into it". Peril sang the national anthem at the Manny Pacquiao vs. Keith Thurman boxing match that was held at the MGM Grand Garden Arena in 2019. Stephanie Sanchez, an entertainment executive at MGM Resorts International who had previously been Fantasy's lead vocalist, had called her the day of the event, one hour ahead of the soundcheck, to invite her to perform. That day, she had already sung the national anthem for a Vegas Rollers tennis game. Peril, who had been heading to a Smith's Food and Drug supermarket outlet, agreed and headed to the arena. MLive Media Group praised her performance as a "fine rendition".

== Personal life ==
Peril is married to Ray Jon Narbaitz III, who is from Chico, California. By 2022, he had joined the Las Vegas chapter of the Teamsters Union, assisting in convention preparations around Las Vegas. The couple had two dogs in 2016. Peril's father died in 2022.
