= Ask Me Another =

Ask Me Another may refer to:

- Ask Me Another, an NPR and WNYC radio program hosted by Ophira Eisenberg
- A part of the BBC radio quiz show What Do You Know?
