= StandUp in Stilettos =

- Genre: Stand-up comedy
- Presented by: Kate Flannery
- Country of origin: United States
- Original language: English
- No. of seasons: 2
- No. of episodes: 28

Production
- Executive producers: Jeff Singer; Nikki Kemezis
- Running time: 20 to 23 minutes
- Production company: TV Guide Network

Original release
- Network: TVGN
- Release: June 16 – December 22, 2012

Standup in Stilettos is an American stand-up comedy show that aired on the TV Guide Network and was presented by Kate Flannery. It was the first all-women stand-up comedy show to air on a US television network. The series premiered on June 16, 2012 and ran for two seasons.

== Premise ==
Each episode had three female comedians performing. This included upcoming and practiced comedians, as well as comedic actresses. The comedy routines were chosen to be for and by women.

With the show Flannery wanted to introduce a new audience to talented female comedians.

== Episodes ==
=== Series overview ===
| Season | Episodes | Originally released | |
| Season | Episodes | First released | Last released |
|---|---|---|---|
| 1 | 14 | June 16, 2012 | July 28, 2012 |
| 2 | 14 | November 10, 2012 | December 22, 2012 |

=== Season 1 (2012) ===
| No. overall | No. in season | Title | Original release date |
|---|---|---|---|
| 1 | 1 | "Mary Lynn Rajskub, Gina Yashere, Sarah Tiana" | June 16, 2012 |
| 2 | 2 | "Arden Myrin, Helen Hong, Lisa Landry" | June 16, 2012 |
| 3 | 3 | "Retta, Lisa Sundstedt, Lisa Alvarado" | June 23, 2012 |
| 4 | 4 | "Maria Bamford, Jamie Lee, Erin Jackson" | June 23, 2012 |
| 5 | 5 | "Carol Leifer, Christina Pazsitzky, Frances Callier, Angela V. Shelton" | June 30, 2012 |
| 6 | 6 | "Paula Bel, Erica Watson, Felicia Michaels" | June 30, 2012 |
| 7 | 7 | "Kira Soltanovich, Alycia Cooper, Jessica Kirson" | July 7, 2012 |
| 8 | 8 | "Wendy Liebman, Ms. Pat, Erin Foley" | July 7, 2012 |
| 9 | 9 | "Sherry Davey, Marianne Sierk, B-Phlat" | July 14, 2012 |
| 10 | 10 | "Eleanor Kerrigan, Kelly MacFarland, Bemadette Pauley" | July 14, 2012 |
| 11 | 11 | "Lynne Koplitz, Katie Cazorla, Rachel Feinstein" | July 21, 2012 |
| 12 | 12 | "Season 1 Highlights" | July 21, 2012 |
| 13 | 13 | "Tammy Pescatelli, Jade Catta-Preta, Michelle Buteau" | July 28, 2012 |
| 14 | 14 | "Never Before Seen Jokes" | July 28, 2012 |

=== Season 2 (2012) ===
| No. overall | No. in season | Title | Original release date |
|---|---|---|---|
| 15 | 1 | "Laurie Kilmartin, Nadine Rajabi, Hailey Boyle" | November 10, 2012 |
| 16 | 2 | "Luenell, Renee Gauthier, Ophira Eisenberg" | November 10, 2012 |
| 17 | 3 | "Debra DiGiovanni, Karith Foster, Alli Breen" | November 17, 2012 |
| 18 | 4 | "Debi Gutierrez, Heather Snow, Jackie Kashian" | November 17, 2012 |
| 19 | 5 | "Cory Kahaney, Bethany Van Delft, Melissa Villasenor" | November 24, 2012 |
| 20 | 6 | "Jen Kober, Melanie Comarcho, Michelle Collins" | November 24, 2012 |
| 21 | 7 | "Cathy Ladman, Monrok, Shelagh Ranter" | December 1, 2012 |
| 22 | 8 | "Thea Vidale, Tara Berland, Melinda Hill" | December 1, 2012 |
| 23 | 9 | "Michele Balan, Susan Prekel, Amy Anderson" | December 8, 2012 |
| 24 | 10 | "Karen Bergreen, Sharon Houston, Calise Hawkins" | December 8, 2012 |
| 25 | 11 | "Sunda Croonquist, Laura Hayden, Kerri Louise" | December 15, 2012 |
| 26 | 12 | "Top Jokes from Past Episodes" | December 15, 2012 |
| 27 | 13 | "Carole Montgomery, Beth Stelling, Trish Suhr" | December 22, 2012 |
| 28 | 14 | "Season 2 Highlights" | December 22, 2012 |
