= Lisa Alvarado =

Lisa Alvarado may refer to:

- Lisa Alvarado (artist)
- Lisa Alvarado (comedian)
