= Skyline College =

Community college in San Bruno, California, US

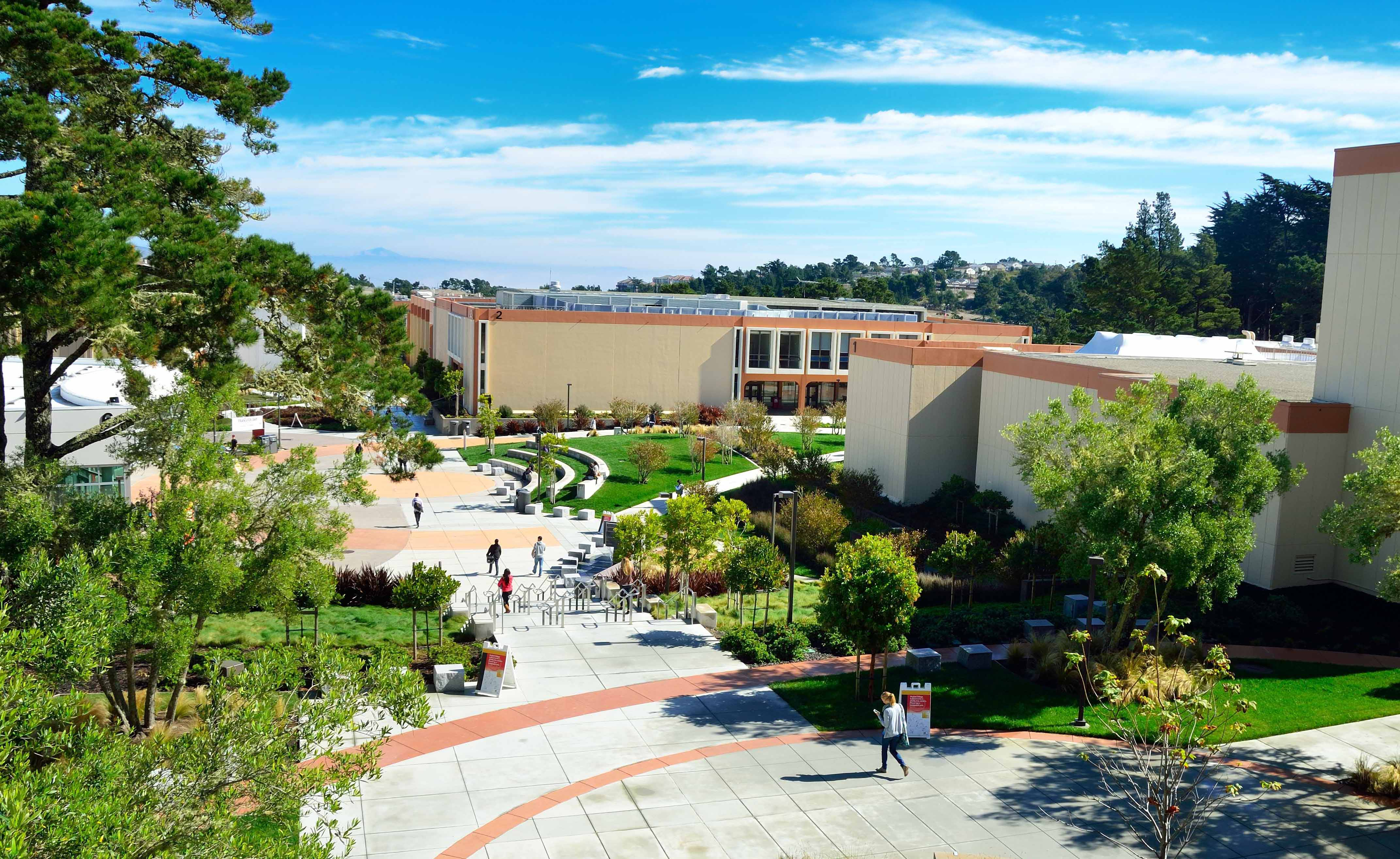
- Campus of Skyline College
- Motto: Students First
- Type: Public community college
- Established: 1969
- Parent institution: San Mateo County Community College District
- President: Dr. Nathan Carter
- Students: 16,000 (2023–24)
- Location: San Bruno, California, United States; 37°37′45″N 122°28′5″W
- Campus: Suburban, 111 acres
- Colors: Red and Black
- Nickname: Trojans
- Website: www.skylinecollege.edu

Skyline College is a public community college in San Bruno, California. Opened in 1969, it is one of three comprehensive community colleges in the San Mateo County Community College District.

Skyline College claims an annual population of over 16,000 students, including many international students. Students can choose from more than 100 degree and certificate programs.

== Academics ==
The college offers over 100 associate degree programs, certificates, and a bachelor's degree program. The college has transfer agreements with a wide range of public and private colleges and offers 29 associate degrees for transfer that offer a streamlined pathway to transfer, securing guaranteed admission with junior standing to the California State University system.

== Student government ==
The students of Skyline College have established a student body association named Associated Students of Skyline College (ASSC). The association is required by law to "encourage students to participate in the governance of the college".

The ASSC periodically participates in meetings sponsored by a statewide community college student organization named Student Senate for California Community Colleges. The statewide Student Senate is authorized by law "to advocate before the Legislature and other state and local governmental entities".

== Notable alumni ==
- Lorena Peril, singer in the Las Vegas show Fantasy
- Wilma Mankiller, Native American activist

== See also ==
- California Community Colleges system
- Cañada College, a community college located in Redwood City
- College of San Mateo, a community college located in San Mateo
