= Manny Pacquiao vs. Keith Thurman =

2019 boxing match

Welterweight Supremacy
- Date: July 20, 2019
- Venue: MGM Grand Garden Arena, Paradise, Nevada, U.S.
- Title(s) on the line: WBA (Super) welterweight title

Tale of the tape
Boxer	Keith Thurman	Manny Pacquiao
Nickname	One Time	Pac-Man
Hometown	Clearwater, Florida, U.S.	General Santos, South Cotabato, Philippines
Pre-fight record	29–0 (1) (22 KO)	61–7–2 (39 KO)
Age	30 years, 7 months	40 years, 7 months
Height	5 ft 7 1/2 in (171 cm)	5 ft 5 1/2 in (166 cm)
Weight	146 1/2 lb (66 kg)	145 1/2 lb (66 kg)
Style	Orthodox	Southpaw
Recognition	WBA (Super); Welterweight Champion; The Ring; No. 3 Ranked Welterweight; TBRB; No. 4 Ranked Welterweight	WBA (Regular); Welterweight Champion; The Ring/TBRB; No. 5 Ranked Welterweight; 8-division world champion

Result
- Pacquiao wins via 12-round split decision (113–114, 115–112, 115–112)

Manny Pacquiao vs. Keith Thurman, billed as Welterweight Supremacy, was a boxing match for the WBA (Super) welterweight championship. The event took place on July 20, 2019 at the MGM Grand Garden Arena in Paradise, Nevada. Pacquiao won the fight by split decision, and at 40 years old, became the oldest welterweight to win a major world title in boxing history. The bout sold 500,000 pay-per-view (PPV) buys in the United States, earning an estimated $37.5 million in pay-per-view revenue.

== Background ==
After Thurman's fight with Josesito López, he publicly said he wanted to fight Pacquiao next. It was initially thought that Errol Spence Jr. would be next on Pacquiao's list when he came up the ring after Spence easily disposed of Mikey Garcia. It had also been rumored that Pacquiao would be facing Thurman next and Spence would instead have a unification bout with Shawn Porter. On May 11, 2019 it was announced that Pacquiao–Thurman would happen on July 20, 2019 and a few days after, MGM Grand Garden Arena announced that they would be hosting the fight. Betting odds started in favor of Thurman but slowly went Pacquiao's way as the fight drew closer. Throughout the promotion, Thurman had nice things to say about Pacquiao being a legend as a sign of respect and would follow it up with how he planned on finishing Pacquiao's career.

== Fight details ==
Pacquiao won the WBA (Super) welterweight title against Thurman via split decision and became the oldest welterweight to win a major title in boxing history. Late in the first round, Pacquiao caught Thurman with a right hand to the chin after a left to the body and knocked him down as he was moving backwards. The first five rounds were vintage for Pacquiao; he bloodied Thurman's nose and forced him into a very intense fight. Thurman looked to have regained his composure in the middle rounds, adjusted to Pacquiao's offense in the second half of the fight and was able to catch him with some hard shots. But in the tenth round, Pacquiao caught Thurman again; this time, it was a vicious left hook to the body that had him moving around the ring, trying to survive the round. Thurman was visibly hurt by the body shot; he later admitted, "The body shot was a terrific body shot. I even took my mouthpiece out of my mouth just so I could breathe a little deeper". Glenn Feldman scored the bout 114–113 for Thurman; Dave Moretti and Tim Cheatham both scored it 115–112 for Pacquiao. Many people, including Pacquiao himself, felt that the first-round knockdown and the tenth-round body shot rightfully secured him the win.

According to CompuBox, Thurman was the more accurate boxer and out-landed Pacquiao. Pacquiao only landed 113 out of 340 of his power punches (33%) against Thurman's 192 out of 443 power punches (43%). Pacquiao was the busier fighter and had a difference of more than 100 punches compared to Thurman. Total punch stats were 195 out of 686 (28%) for Pacquiao and 210 out of 571 (37%) for Thurman.

=== Official scorecards ===
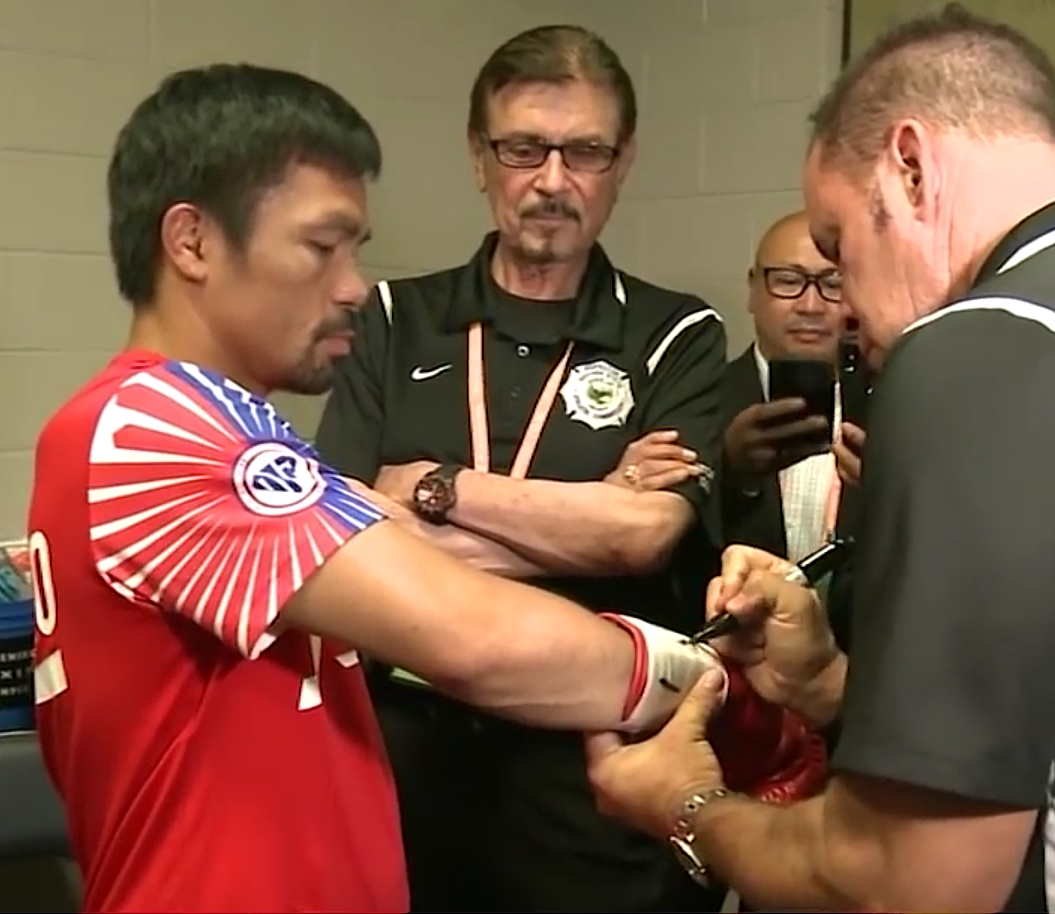
Pacquiao gets his gloves inspected by an official.

Judge	Fighter	1	2	3	4	5	6	7	8	9	10	11	12	Total	Source
Dave Moretti	Pacquiao	10	10	9	10	10	9	9	10	9	10	9	10	115	
Dave Moretti	Thurman	8	9	10	9	9	10	10	9	10	9	10	9	112	
Glenn Feldman	Pacquiao	10	10	9	10	10	9	9	9	9	10	9	9	113	
Glenn Feldman	Thurman	8	9	10	9	9	10	10	10	10	9	10	10	114	
Tim Cheatham	Pacquiao	10	10	10	10	10	9	9	9	9	10	9	10	115	
Tim Cheatham	Thurman	8	9	9	9	9	10	10	10	10	9	10	9	112	

== Aftermath ==
With the victory, Pacquiao also became the first boxer to become a recognized four-time welterweight champion, breaking his tie with Jack Britton and Emile Griffith. He also returned to The Ring's list of top 10 pound for pound boxers for the first time since April 2016.

== Fight card ==
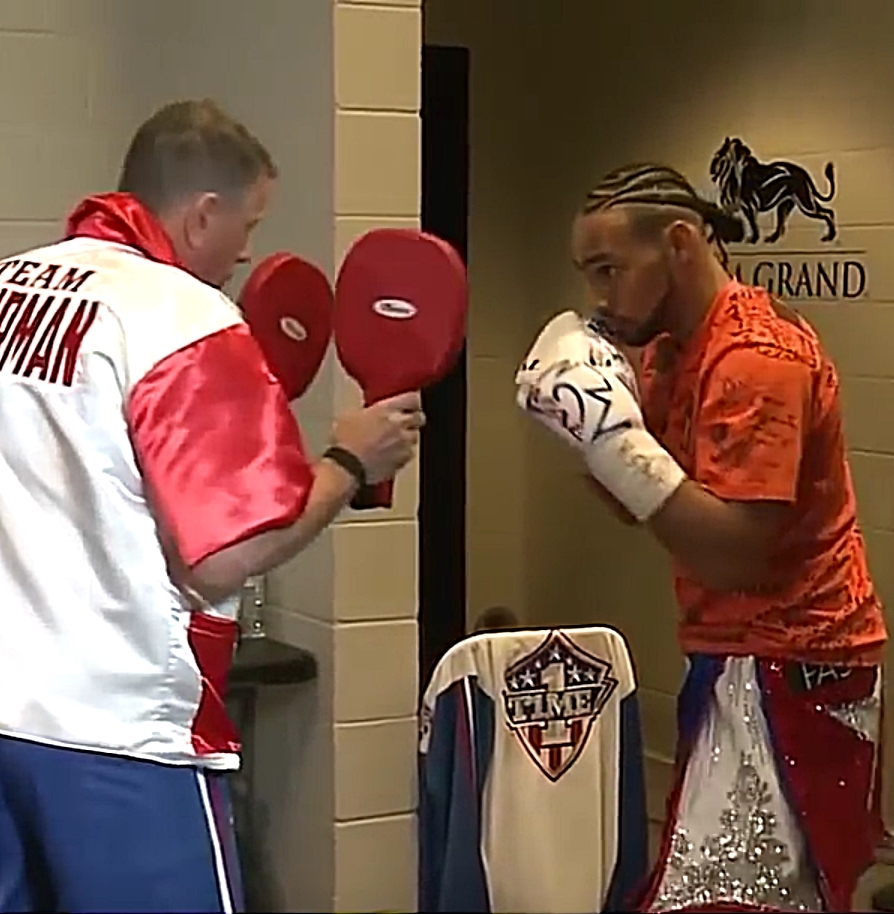
Thurman warming up with trainer Dan Birmingham.

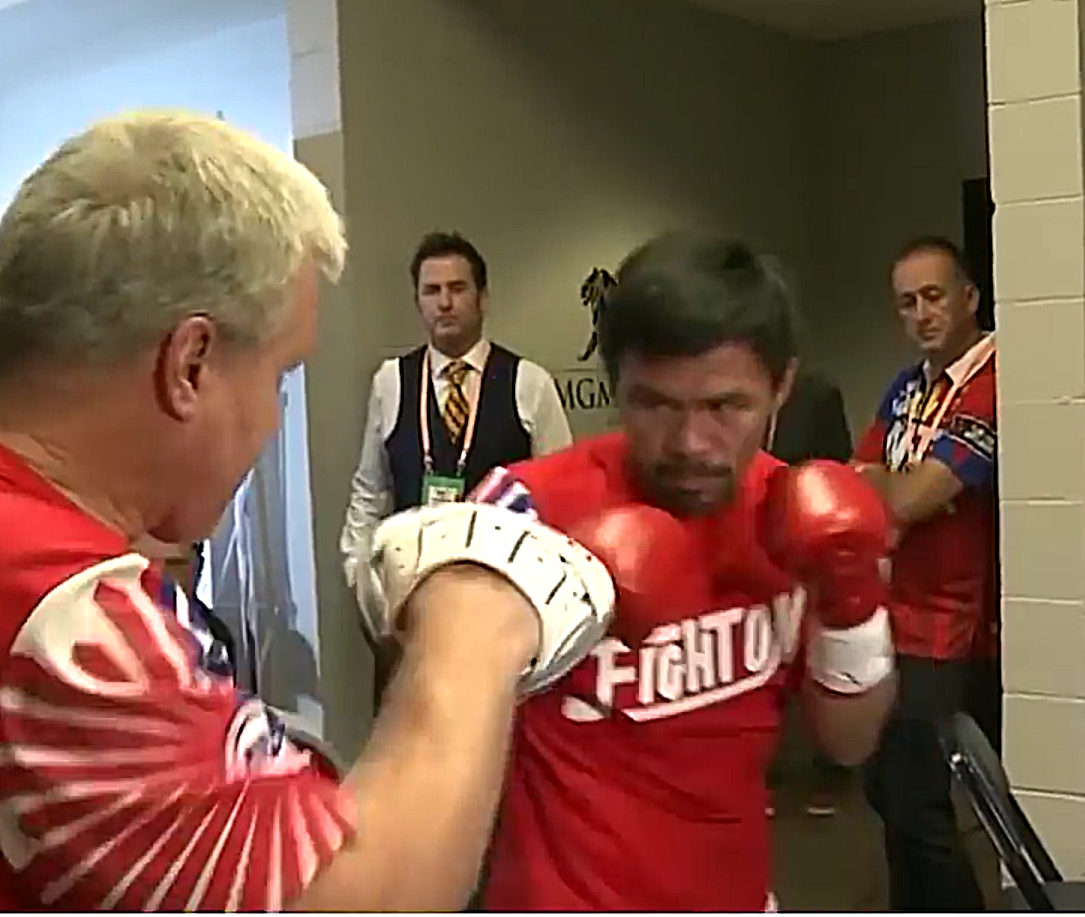
Pacquiao warming up with trainer Freddie Roach.

Confirmed bouts:

Weight Class	Weight		vs.		Method	Round	Time	Note
Main card (Fox PPV)
Welterweight	147 lbs.	(Philippines) Manny Pacquiao	def.	(United States) Keith Thurman (c)	SD	12/12		^{Note 1}
Welterweight	147 lbs.	(Cuba) Yordenis Ugás	def.	(United States) Omar Figueroa Jr.	UD	12/12
Welterweight	147 lbs.	(Russia) Sergey Lipinets	def.	(Philippines) Jayar Inson	TKO	2/10	0:57
Bantamweight	118 lbs.	(Mexico) Luis Nery	def.	(Dominican Republic) Juan Carlos Payano	KO	9/12	1:43
Undercard (Fox)
Super middleweight	168 lbs.	(United States) Caleb Plant (c)	def.	(United States) Mike Lee	TKO	3/12	1:29	^{Note 2}
Heavyweight	200+ lbs.	(Nigeria) Efe Ajagba	def.	(Turkey) Ali Eren Demirezen	UD	10/10

^Note 1 For WBA (Super) welterweight title
^Note 2 For IBF super middleweight title

== Broadcasting ==
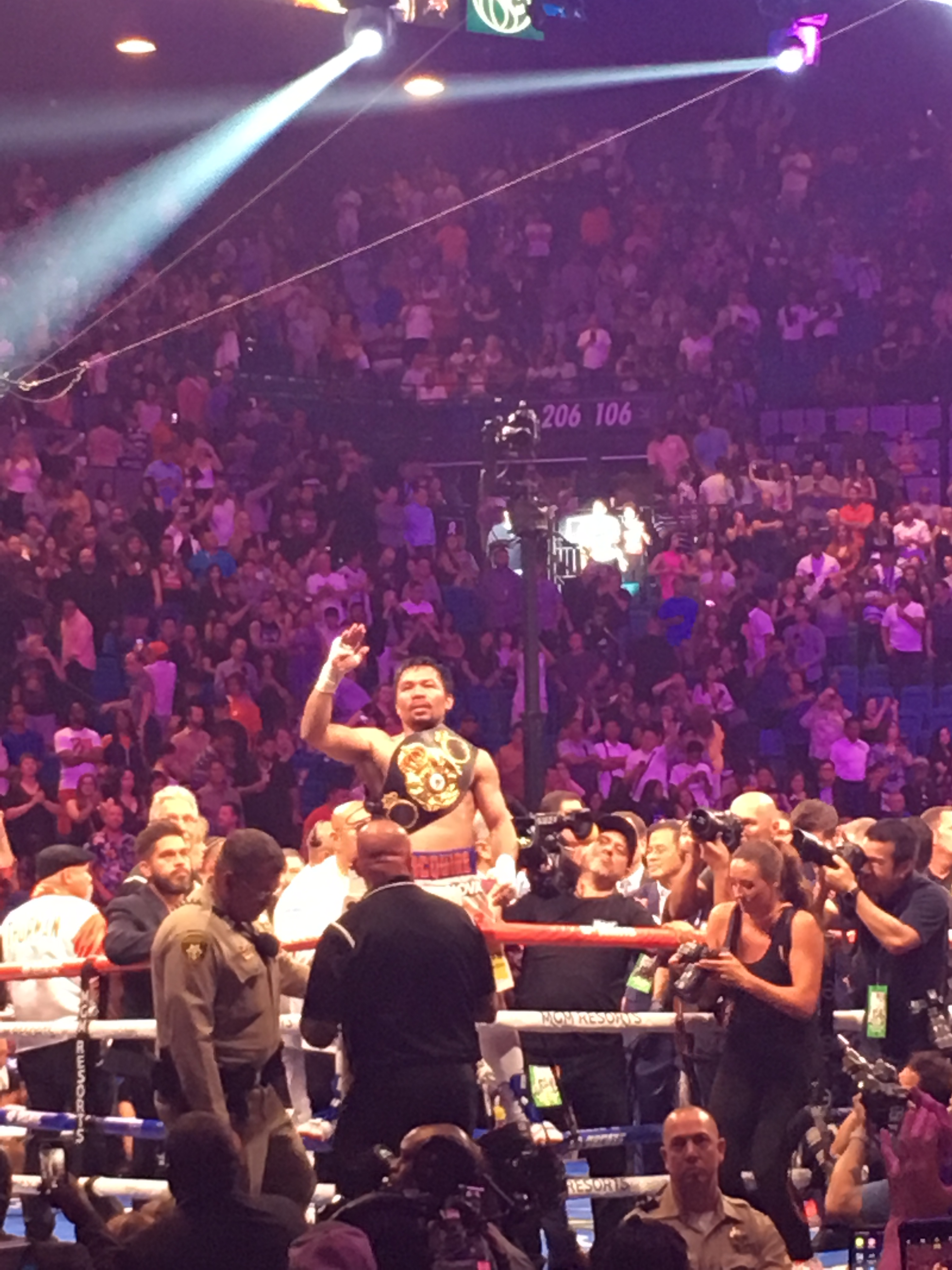
Pacquiao celebrating in the ring after his victory over Thurman.

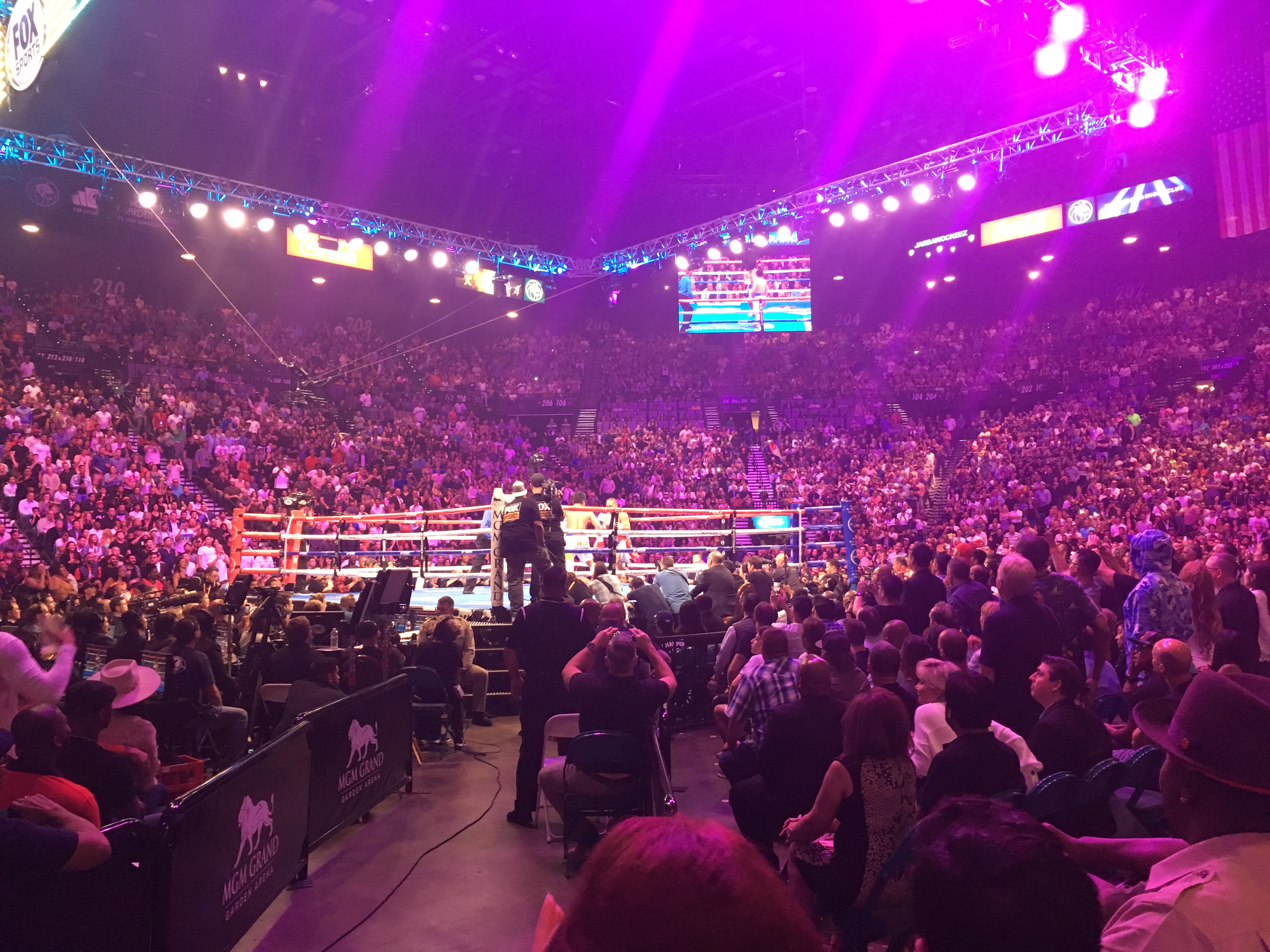
MGM Grand Garden Arena during the main event.

The fight was televised on PPV's Fox in the United States and both Sky Sports and Cignal in the Philippines. ABS-CBN also had exclusive rights to broadcast the fight on Philippine free-to-air.

Country	Broadcaster			
Country	Free-to-air	Cable/pay television	PPV	Stream
Australia	—N/a		Main Event	—N/a
(Caribbean Community) Caribbean	—N/a	Fox Premium		Fox Play
France	—N/a	RMC Sport	—N/a	RMC Sport
Indonesia	Mola TV		—N/a	Mola TV On Demand
(Republic of Ireland) Ireland	—N/a		ITV Box Office	Fite TV
Japan	—N/a	Wowow	—N/a	Wowow
(Middle East and North Africa) MENA	—N/a		OSN Cinema	OSN Play
Mexico	Azteca 7	—N/a		Azteca En Vivo
New Zealand	—N/a		Sky Arena	—N/a
Panama	Telemetro	—N/a		Medcom Go
Philippines	ABS-CBN (delayed)	ABS-CBN S+A (delayed)	Cignal	iWant (delayed)
Philippines	ABS-CBN (delayed)	One Sports (delayed)	Cignal	Cignal Play
Philippines	ABS-CBN (delayed)	One Sports (delayed)	Cignal	ESPN5
Philippines	ABS-CBN (delayed)	Solar Sports (delayed)	Sky Sports	Sky On Demand
Poland	TVP Sport	—N/a		TVP Stream
Russia	Match TV			
South America: Argentina; Bolivia; Brazil; Chile; Colombia; Ecuador; Paraguay; Peru; Uruguay; Venezuela	—N/a	Fox Premium		Fox Play
Sub-Saharan Africa	—N/a	SuperSport	—N/a	DStv Go
Thailand	PPTV	—N/a		PPTV
Timor-Leste	Mola TV		—N/a	Mola TV On Demand
Turkey	DMAX	—N/a		DMAX
United Kingdom	—N/a		ITV Box Office	Fite TV
United States	Fox	FS1	Fox	Fox Sports Go
United States	Fox	Fox Deportes	Fox	Fox Sports Go

== National anthem singers ==
- (Philippines) "Lupang Hinirang" – The First Word Choir
- (United States) "The Star-Spangled Banner" – Lorena Peril

Preceded by vs. Adrien Broner	Manny Pacquiao's bouts July 20, 2019	Succeeded by vs. Yordenis Ugás
Preceded by vs. Josesito Lopez	Keith Thurman's bouts July 20, 2019	Succeeded by vs. Mario Barrios
