= Fantasy (Las Vegas show) =

Las Vegas revue

Fantasy: The Strip's Sexiest Tease
- Genre: Revue
- Show type: resident
- Date of premiere: November 1, 1999
- Location: Luxor Las Vegas, Las Vegas Strip, Nevada, U.S.

Creative team
- Producer: Anita Mann
- Official website

Fantasy: The Strip's Sexiest Tease (formerly known as Midnight Fantasy) is a revue performed on the Las Vegas Strip at the Luxor casino hotel, in Las Vegas, Nevada, United States. Opened in November 1999, Fantasy is the topless production in Las Vegas with the longest duration at a single venue. Of female revues on the Strip, Fantasy was the earliest to open. The show is produced by the choreographer Anita Mann. It features 15 dance acts accompanied by classic and contemporary pop music that a vocalist performs live. After MGM Mirage purchased the Luxor in 2005, the production was renamed from Midnight Fantasy to Fantasy. MGM requested changes to comport with its focus on attracting a more youthful clientele. Choreographers Cris Judd and Eddie Garcia revised the numbers, lip synching was cut, and the number of topless scenes was reduced. Fantasy's dance routines and songs are changed annually.

Lead vocalists who have performed on the show have included Stephanie Dianna Sanchez (previously known as Stephanie Jordan), Angelica Bridges, Jaime Lynch, and Lorena Peril. Peril, the current lead vocalist, has been on the show since 2016. Comedians have also performed on the show including Carole Montgomery, Sean E. Cooper, John Padon, Murray SawChuck, and Shayma Tash. Other performers have been the juggler Anthony Gatto, the tap dancer Lindell Blake, and the stunt performer Jonathan Goodwin. Fantasy lacks "crass" or X-rated content, which—according to reviewers—explains why the show's audience has many women and couples. Reviewers, for the most part, have praised the show's dancers for their artistry and skill—in particular, singer Lorena Peril has been lauded for having a strong voice with wide range.

== History ==
Fantasy is a revue, vampish show, cabaret as well as variety show. (Note: For the show's being a revue; For the show's being a cabaret; For the show's being a vampish show; For the show's being a variety show) Joel Fischman, Mandalay Bay's entertainment director, reached out to the producer Anita Mann in 1999. He requested that she create an adult production for a theater housed in Luxor Las Vegas, a casino hotel in Nevada, United States. Mann was given six weeks to choose, train, and outfit the performers after the company approved her plan. The topless show Midnight Fantasy began previews in October 1999. It debuted on November 1, 1999. Midnight Fantasy initially was scheduled to be performed for five months. It was later renewed and has been in a "one-year rollover contract" since 2000. Fischman said Midnight Fantasy is "about exemplifying the female body and not degrading in any way ... it's a really classy, old-style topless show that's not vulgar in any way". While Las Vegas properties targeted experiences to families in the 1990s, Midnight Fantasy was part of a trend in the early 2000s for resorts to try to attract a new, more hedonistic customer base. It violated Mandalay Bay's enduring "no nudity" rule at its properties.

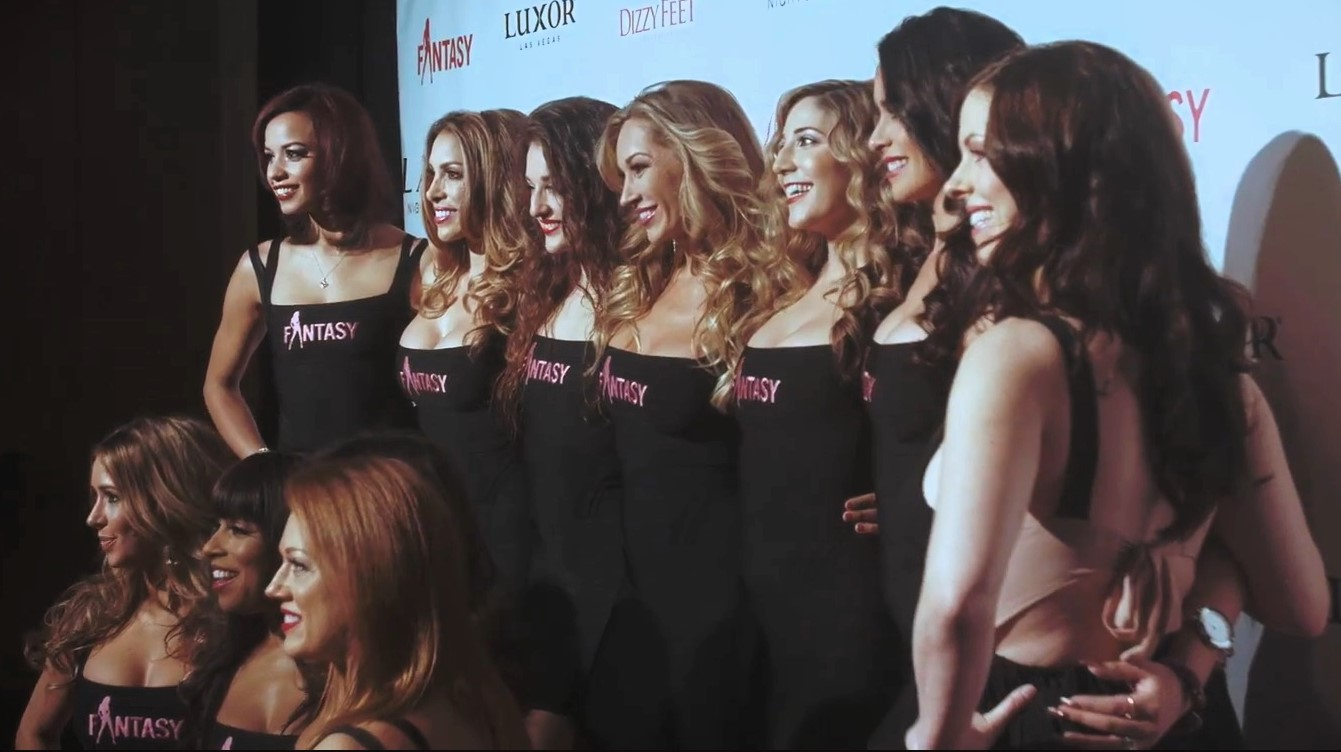
Fantasy dancers in 2015

When it opened, aside from a Tuesday rest day, Midnight Fantasy ran daily. It was performed at 10pm every day, while Saturday had an additional midnight performance. After the impressionist Bill Acosta departed from the Luxor in November 2000, Fantasy increased the number of performances and refined the stage designs and outfits. That month, the show had midnight performances on Fridays and Saturdays. In 2001, the showtimes were set for 8:30pm and 10:30pm. Mann was the founding producer, while Tiger Martina was the founding choreographer. Midnight Fantasy's nine founding dancers were Betsy Alletzhauser, Georgia Bernasek, Dejah Juarez, Lisa Leieritz, Stacy Lyons, Jennifer Rohlman, Shannon Seil, Charidy Sullivan LaFontaine, and Jennifer Young. Bernasek and Young were the founding head dancers, while the founding floor captain was Dejah Juarez. The founding singers were Betsy Alletzhauser and Charidy Sullivan LaFontaine.

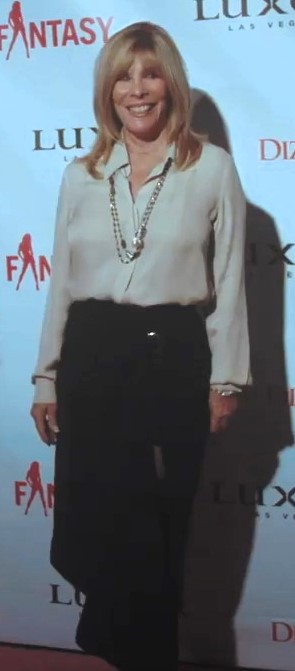
Choreographer and producer Anita Mann in 2015

After years away, it was Mann's comeback to the Strip. She previously had produced both family-friendly shows and stimulating revues. Throughout the show's history, Mann has introduced additional numbers. When Mann attends a performance, she documents her observations in a notebook and provides feedback to the cast who implement it in the following show. Featuring two cast members from the Las Vegas show, Midnight Fantasy was performed in 2004 at Gold Strike Tunica in Tunica Resorts, Mississippi.

The entertainment company MGM Mirage purchased Luxor in 2005. Mann was tasked with updating the show to comport with the company's focus on attracting a more youthful clientele. MGM wanted Fantasy to have a "fun, young, party feel" and not to rival their MGM Grand topless show La Femme. With MGM's consent, Midnight Fantasy was renamed to Fantasy in August 2005. Since the show no longer performed at midnight, audience members were often bewildered by the name. The show, which had not been refreshed since the end of 2000, underwent several changes. The show reduced the number of segments where the dancers were topless. MGM asked that long-time performers comedian Carole Montgomery and tap dancer Lindell Blake be excluded from the show which Mann implemented. Sal Salangsang, a comedian who had performed on MGM Grand's EFX Alive!, was brought in to take their place.

Fantasy kept most of its existing songs but got rid of the performers' lip syncing. The choreographers Cris Judd and Eddie Garcia were enlisted to revise the dance routines. Judd made occasional trips to Las Vegas to gradually change the routines so that the show could continue running without interruption. Of the show's 10 dance numbers, six were eliminated. In assessing the changes, Las Vegas Sun reviewer Jerry Fink found that the movements and several of the outfits were "funkier" and gave off a music video vibe. Although some of the performers sported jean jackets with sequins and glistening jewelry, they largely no longer wore fancy attire. By 2008, Fantasy had sensuous hip hop numbers. Judd and Darren Sher, the musical director, composed music for the show, while Judd and Martina came up with updated dance routines. Every one to two months, the production introduced additional acts. Judd and the singer Stephanie Jordan wrote new songs for the show. Pop songs like "Let's Get It Started"—which Las Vegas Review-Journal's Mike Weatherford said rapidly shifts from new to laughable—were supplanted by these new songs. According to Weatherford, although the original pieces might barely exceed the level of "guitar-funk Prince riffs or dance-diva pop", Jordan exudes confidence when singing her original "Goin' to Vegas" and brings the identical vibrant zeal into the traditional go-tos.

Fantasy performed continuously from its founding until December 2013 while its venue, Atrium Theater, underwent nearly three weeks of refurbishments and the installation of upgraded sound and lighting systems. On May 4, 2017, Fantasy performed for the 7,000th time. At the beginning of the COVID-19 pandemic in March 2020, Fantasy alongside other shows at MGM Resorts' Las Vegas properties temporarily shut down. It resumed shows on November 6, 2020, but had to shut down again close to Thanksgiving after Nevada regulations restricted the number of spectators to at most 50. During its November performances before the shutdown, the performers did the show in a bigger venue, wore masks, and had to be socially distant from spectators. While the dancers and spectators were required to put on masks, the singer could go without a mask during her performances. Fantasy resumed shows a second time on February 19, 2021.

Usher watched Fantasy with his girlfriend in 2021 and spoke with the performers following the show. Sting—the singer-songwriter of "Roxanne", one of the songs sung in Fantasy—attended a 2022 performance. Mariah Rivera, a dancer on the show, became Fantasy's co-producer alongside Anita Mann in 2022. Rivera was given the responsibility of overseeing the show's social media initiatives and public events. She also oversees the retail of Fantasy products sold on the Internet and at the venue.

Fantasy is the topless production in Las Vegas with the longest duration at a single venue, which is the Luxor Las Vegas casino hotel. Of the female revues on the Strip, Fantasy was the earliest to open. The Las Vegas Weekly gave the show the 2020 "All-Time Best of Vegas" award in the "Best Female Revue" category. Reader voting determined the recipient of that award. The newspaper's readers in 2021 chose it as the "Best Production" show which the publication said was owing to its "scorching-hot dancers, comic relief and advanced production elements"

In October 2024, Fantasy's staff commemorated its 25th anniversary. At the time, the Las Vegas Review-Journal columnist John Katsilometes called the show Las Vegas's "longest-running adult revue". The longest-serving performer, Mariah Nieslanik, had appeared on her 3,978th Fantasy show on October 16, 2024. At its 25th anniversary, a total of 122 dancers, 39 singers (inclusive of swing performers), 21 guest performers who provide entertainment midway through the show, and 16 aeralists had performed on Fantasy.

== Venue ==
Midnight Fantasy opened in November 1999 at Luxor Las Vegas's Pharaoh's Theater, which seats 350 people. The theater was renamed to Atrium Showroom in 2005 after the casino executive Felix Rappaport began running Luxor. The theater was in a sharply inclined, rake space. It had a single raised stage containing runner lights. The travel writers Don W. and Betty Martin said the "steeply tiered" design allowed each spectator to have a good vantage point. The theater was movable and probably had been employed in a cruise ship's theater, Las Vegas Review-Journal reviewer Michael Paskevich speculated. In a nod to Midnight Fantasy's name and when it is last performed, the theater had a flat-faced clock stuck at 12 past the hour. The dancers made their way onto and off the stage via a large clock that doubles as a screen. Since 2005, Carrot Top has performed in the Atrium Showroom which he has occupied alongside Fantasy.

When the show reopened in November 2020 after temporarily closing because of the COVID-19 pandemic, it was performed at the Luxor Theater. It was the first time since the show's founding that it was not performed in the Atrium Showroom. Located at the same level as the casino, the theater was where the Cirque du Soleil show R.U.N. used to be performed. The Luxor Theater has a capacity of 1,500 people. The show had to temporarily relocate because of a requirement that there be 25 feet (7.6 m) in between the performers and the spectators as well as 6 feet (1.8 m) in between every group of attendees. While the dancers and spectators were required to put on masks, the singer could go without a mask during her performance. Fantasy returned to the smaller Atrium Showroom in July 2021. Around 2023, the Atrium Showroom put in place a LED screen which is used in the production.

== Show ==
Fantasy performance in August 2024

=== First production ===
When Midnight Fantasy opened in November 1999, it featured dance routines and solo dance performances from a nine-member female-only dance ensemble. The women wore loose clothing that was fashioned to come off quickly, facilitating extensive showing of their exposed breasts. Two of the dancers performed live vocals over recorded music. The initial act featured every performer and was in homage to Luxor Las Vegas's Egyptian theme. In "Naughty Nurses", another act, nurses dressed in seductive outfits performed physical examinations on one another while a vocalist sang "Fever". The act had a trio of three musical performances. In the next act, disco music was played, while the dancers were clad in neon G-strings, wigs in many hues, and unfastened vests with feather adornments. The vocalists performed "Some Like It Hot" and "Sexual Healing". A vocalist sang "Why Haven't I Heard from You" in a segment depicting cowboys and rodeo activities as performers wearing vibrant red chaps danced.

Throughout the acts, a voice-over would make double entendre statements. Dressed in a suggestive black gown, a singer performed "Black Velvet" as the performers wore an all-black attire of G-strings and gloves. Two performers dance while being linked by a lengthy elastic strip, steering clear of getting completely knotted up. A dancer performed the solo piece "Erotica". In a following act, the dancers wore the blue pinstripe suit attire of board of directors members which they remove to reveal jewels and black bustiers. As the women removed their clothes, a vocalist sang the Randy Newman song "You Can Leave Your Hat On". The final act was a scene that evokes heaven with the nine dancers clad in the wings of angels. The show closes with each woman presenting herself and taking a bow.

=== Later productions ===
During a 2000 production, the women did lip synching to a soundtrack about her "Midnight Fantasy" in front of a clock with its hand pointing at midnight. In 2001 production, the show featured an act where three of the performers were in a bed while the Billy Idol song "Flesh for Fantasy" played. They took each other's clothes off while under the sheets. In a 2004 production, the performers used ten-gallon cowboy hats to conceal their breasts. The show created a new first scene in which the dancers wore transparent, airy material in place of the weighty gold capes they previously wore. In a 2008 production, a dancer did a striptease while the Idina Menzel song "Damsel in Distress" plays. Imitating cowgirls, the performers in 2009 wore red hats and boots as they danced to "Save a Horse (Ride a Cowboy)". That year, the performers began the initial act by taking off their bras at the same time as they yell their names. Three acts were a Cuban salsa with drumming from the conga, an aerial silk demonstration, and striptease from a woman imitating a police officer. In another scene, the performers give a volunteer a silly transformation by costuming the volunteer as Elvis Presley.

The show underwent changes in 2016. The first act was set to the Little Mix song "Salute", while the last act was set the Justin Timberlake song "Can't Stop the Feeling!" An act introduced that year featured a performer clad in white chiffon and royal-blue gloves while dancing to the Indiana piece "Solo Dancing". In 2022, the performers ran a contest among audience members to determined who danced most effectively to "Proud Mary". In 2023, for the show's first time, dancers provided live vocals. Three dancers performed the song "But I Am a Good Girl".

Fantasy is 80 minutes long. A comedian used to perform for 15 minutes in the middle of the show, but by 2023, the comedian part was cut so that more of the routines could be performed. Fantasy features 15 dance acts accompanied by classic and contemporary pop music. At the end of the show, the dancers head to the lobby to greet audience members.

== Cast members ==
=== Singers ===
- The singer Stephanie Dianna Sanchez, previously known as Stephanie Jordan, performed on the show for nine years before departing in September 2009. She sang "Let 'er Rip" from the Dixie Chicks, "Man! I Feel Like a Woman!" from Shania Twain, "Lady Marmalade", and "Roxanne". Jordan engaged with both the dancers and the viewers. Clad in a corset, Jordan sang "Black Velvet" and danced as the other performers used cords to encircle her. The Las Vegas Sun reviewer Jerry Fink praised her performance, stating, "Even without exposing herself, the sultry Jordan is as sexy and provocative as any of the hoofers". He lauded Jordan's "purring, throaty, exotic voice" and "teasing personality" that lets her effortlessly engage with the men and women viewing her performance. Las Vegas Weekly's Richard Abowitz praised her "flair, good humor and enthusiasm". Mike Weatherford of the Las Vegas Review-Journal said Jordan provided a "suitably sultry appeal" and did an excellent job confronting the challenges posed by singing to a recording.
- The singer Angelica Bridges performed on the show between October 13, 2009, and July 31, 2010. Bridges was chosen to inject celebrity appeal into the show as she had been on Baywatch and Playboy. She performed Nancy Sinatra and Portishead songs and music from Strawberry Blonde, her group, such as "Do It to the Music". According to Richard Abowitz of the Las Vegas Sun, she had a distinctive appearance because in an uncommon move, she selected her own outfits instead of relying on those from a stylist or director. When she debuted on Fantasy, Abowitz called her "a burst of new energy and attention". She resigned from the show after becoming exhausted by the time commitment and physical strain of singing at six performances each week. She wanted to reduce her weekly schedule from six to five days, but Anita Mann, the producer, needed the presenter to be regularly available. The Las Vegas Sun reviewer John Katsilometes said Fantasy did not align with Bridges' style because her vocals were better matched to her singing ensemble Strawberry Blonde's techno-pop sound. The Los Angeles Times reviewer Steve Friess called Bridge's singing "meager" and her failure to build a connection with viewers "embarrassing".
- Lorena Peril auditioned for the show in 2005 after moving to Las Vegas that year. She had responded to an Internet ad to be a substitute singer for Stephanie Dianna Sanchez when Sanchez was on break. The producer, Anita Mann, realized she needed a full-time role and pledged to think of her when one became available. In July 2010, Peril had been performing in Las Vegas Hilton's Sin City Bad Girls, which was concluding its run. She reached out to Mann. That month, the Fantasy singer Angelica Bridges had wanted to reduce her workload on the show, which led to Mann giving Peril the role as Fantasy's lead singer. Peril was the show's singer between August 1, 2010, and July 22, 2013. The Las Vegas Sun reviewer John Katsilometes in 2010 called her "a dynamite singer and strong stage presence who has the type of lights-out voice" that sustains the show on a nightly basis. Mike Weatherford of the Las Vegas Review-Journal found her to be a boisterous host who steers the show in the direction of "loud pop with a Latin flair". Katsilometes liked her joint dancing with the comedian Sean E. Cooper to the tune of the Shakira song "Hips Don't Lie", calling it "a nightly highlight". During the act, Cooper slipped beneath her skirt and shouted, "This is like a car wash!"
  Peril departed from the show in 2013 to be Sandy in the musical Grease's worldwide tour. Jaime Lynch took over her the singer role. After occasionally substituting in Fantasy when other performers were unavailable, Peril returned to the show in 2016 when Lynch sought to ease her workload on the production. She said that compared to other shows where she was unable to stray from the script, in Fantasy she could speak extemporaneously and bring merriment to the audience. Peril engaged in light-hearted teasing in English and another language, quipping that "the dude sections are always really quiet" and chuckling uproariously at her playful remarks where she declares, "I just snorted. It's on now!" She ventured into the aisle to interact with spectators. The Las Vegas Sun reviewer John Katsilometes called her a "great fit" for Fantasy with her "powerful, rangy voice" and for having an "engaging personality" that smoothly charms spectators. Writing for Las Vegas Weekly in 2023, Brock Radke called her "one of the best voices on the Strip".
- The X Factor finalist Jaime Lynch performed as lead singer between 2013 and 2016. The producer, Anita Mann, had initially become aware of Lynch when Lynch was preparing to appear in iCandy Burlesque at the Saxe Theater in Planet Hollywood's Miracle Mile Shops. Mann did not have a role for Lynch at the time because Peril was performing on the show. After Peril departed to perform in Grease, Mann hired Lynch to be Fantasy's primary vocalist. Mike Weatherford of the Las Vegas Review-Journal praised her performance, writing, "she projects a sweetness in the crowd banter that epitomizes the shows nice-over-naughty tone". In 2016, Lynch reduced her workload on the show to once a week and became a substitute for Peril, who returned to the show.

=== Dancers ===
The Las Vegas Sun's Jerry Fink compared Fantasy to other erotic shows. He said that whereas those productions' performers had nearly the same body shape, Midnight Fantasy's dancers had a diversity of body shapes. In his 2005 assessment of the dancers, Las Vegas Weekly's Abowitz agreed that there were a mixture of statures and body types but found that blonde women were overrepresented. The Las Vegas Review-Journal's Mike Weatherford found a diversity of hairstyles and body shapes when he reviewed the show in 2008. He said in 2009 that the performers' breasts were varied, ranging from "ballet sleek to Vegas-girl implants".

A number of the performers have been part of Fantasy for years. Mariah Rivera, who had danced for Fantasy for almost 11 years, said in 2020, "Most of the girls don't want to leave, ever. We're family. We're friends. The only time people leave the show is to have babies. It's most dancers' dream job, so we're not giving up those spots easily." The show was performed every day of the week in 2019. It featured 12 dancers, with eight cycling in and out for a performance.

=== Comedians ===
- The comedian Carole Montgomery began performing in Midnight Fantasy around 2002. She had previously performed standup comedy at the Riviera's topless revue Crazy Girls. Calling the role a challenge, Montgomery said in an interview she enjoys it "because (audiences) don't want to see a comic; they don't want to see the singer; they don't want to see the tap dancer in the show. They want to see the naked girls." Montgomery, who was completely dressed, joked during a 2004 show, "I see some of the men are disappointed, huh? You expected me to be topless. Believe me, you don't want to see my (chest). I'm 45 years old. I breast fed a child. I could wear them as a scarf -- OK, yeah, there's one guy, 'Yeah, let's see them anyway, so they're droopy. We don't care.'"
  Another joke she made was, "There's a warning label on Viagra -- 'If you have an erection for more than four hours call your doctor.' My husband said, 'If I'm erect after four hours, I'm calling everybody I know.'" Other topics she covered were erections early in the day, drooping bosoms, getting older, and her involvement in the parent–teacher association. The Las Vegas Sun reviewer Jerry Fink described her set as the production's most risqué segment but that her content was delivered in an unobjectionable way. The reviewer concluded that her jokes were "hilarious in the theater". Mike Weatherford of the Las Vegas Review-Journal compared her "domestic bedroom humor" to that of Robert Schimmel. After MGM Mirage acquired Luxor in 2005, her role in the show was eliminated.
- The impressionist and comedian Sean E. Cooper performed on the show for 18 years before leaving on February 12, 2020, to explore options as a solo act. Starting from the show's premiere, he had performed on it periodically. Cooper imitated James Brown, Michael Jackson, and Tina Turner. When he imitated Turner while performing "Proud Mary", he was in drag. The Las Vegas Sun reviewer Jerry Fink praised Cooper's impression of Turner as "hilarious". After he impersonated Turner, he took off his toupée to show his bald scalp. During a set in 2009, Cooper imitated Michael Jackson by using whiteface. In the show's midpoint in 2010, he said that through the income they earn from their casinos, Native Americans have sufficient funds to break into the rap industry. After delivering his take on a Native American-themed rap, he quipped that it would be likely to flop as the divine realm might be misunderstand it as being a rain dance. One of Cooper's quips is about masturbation using the Fantasy calendar, which the Las Vegas Review-Journal's Mike Weatherford called "kind of gross" and demonstrating how "much like topless show choreography, dirty humor is tougher than it looks".
- Sal Salangsang, who had previously been in the MGM Grand show EFX began performing in Fantasy in 2005. He replaced Montgomery, the comedian, and Lindell Blake, a tap dancer. In a pre-show skit, he posed as a stagehand who gets hounded by his boss. During various parts of the show, he played the air guitar and delivered other humorous skits. The Las Vegas Sun reviewer Jerry Fink criticized Salangsang's performance as having "kill[ing] the mood and the spirit of the evening" and being "an anchor" to a newly renovated show.
- The comedian John Padon performed on the show in 2000. Mike Weatherford of the Las Vegas Review-Journal said Padon gave "welcome bite" through "topical and universal" jokes. He cited Padon's reference to the 2000 United States presidential election recount in Florida in the joke, "Give (the state) to Cuba. It would cut down on Social Security, too." He performed for two years until 2002 when he joined the Aladdin show X — An Erotic Adventure. Padon rotated performances with Sean E. Cooper in 2013.
- The magician and comedian Murray SawChuck began performing on the show around 2020 after Cooper, the previous comedian, left. SawChuck said that when he visited Las Vegas, Midnight Fantasy was the inaugural show he had attended. He described his 15-minute performance as being lower pressure compared to his typical one-hour shows. SawChuck was assisted by Dani Elizabeth, a showgirl. He was a periodic entertainer on the show until 2023 when the comedian act was cut from Fantasy.
- The comedian Shayma Tash alternated performances with SawChuck. When she was new to Las Vegas, she collaborated with Carrot Top which was how she was introduced to Fantasy which is performed in the same venue. She began performing in Fantasy in 2009. Tash said that while performing comedy on the show, she can be attired in an evening gown. According to Tash, spectators in other settings might not feel at ease when seeing a woman comedian in an alluring outfit, thinking they should be "quirky not sexy". She said, "But this show is giving me the opportunity to express both sides of myself in the same show, which is incredibly unique." In one set, she picked up a spectator's handbag and detailed the items as though she were making a live sales pitch on a shopping television channel. Tash performed on the show until 2023 when the comedian act was cut from Fantasy.

=== Other performers ===
- The juggler Anthony Gatto performed in Midnight Fantasy when it premiered in 1999. As he performed largely without speaking, he quickly juggled hula hoops, swiftly thrown clubs, and balls aimed for baskets. Joe Delaney of the Las Vegas Sun said that the audience most liked the part of the show where Gatto juggled.
- The tap dancer Lindell Blake performed on the show in 2004. Blake frequently took his shirt off, showing his "chiseled pecs and six-pack abs". The Las Vegas Sun reviewer Jerry Fink speculated that his "buff physique must be there as a treat for the female fans". After MGM Mirage acquired Luxor in 2005, his role in the show was eliminated.
- The dancer Sisqó was a guest performer on the show for two weeks in December 2010. Fantasy swing singer Debora Flores Narvaez had asked him to see an earlier performance of Fantasy and the duo came up with the idea of dancing to "Thong Song" together in Fantasy. Narvaez was murdered by her boyfriend, Jason Griffith, before the show's debut.
- The stunt performer Jonathan Goodwin was on the show between October 2020 and September 2021 until he resigned to compete in the television show America's Got Talent: Extreme, where he had a career-ending injury. As part of one set, he used a bullwhip. In another set, he was blindfolded as he used a crossbow to hit progressively tinier objects held in the hands and mouth of a helper.

== Audience ==
Mike Weatherford of the Las Vegas Review-Journal said the show is "more about being fun than erotic". According to Weatherford, the show was "fairly unremarkable" in its 1999 debut but that Anita Mann, the producer, and her team had discovered the optimal mix of "titillation and touristy corn pone" to capture the interest of couples. He said in 2000 that the show, which was dominated with couples in the audience, was "decidedly short on bachelor-party-style hootin' and hollerin'". The Las Vegas Sun's Jerry Fink had a similar view in 2004, saying that the show's high-speed tempo prevents it from becoming crude. Midnight Fantasy, he said, avoids prolonged focus on any single fantasy or sultry maneuver and is "too well-staged to be crass". He observed that there was an evenly distributed group of both genders represented in the viewers. According to Fink, female partners need not feel apprehensive about what the performers do. He commented that at one showing, there was an old couple using walkers, couples who had been recently married, and men and women without partners.

To differentiate between coupled and single attendees, the comedian Carole Montgomery in 2004 requested that people clap. There were far more married attendees. With MGM Mirage's acquisition of the show's venue in 2005, it underwent a revamping. Fink observed that year that viewers were largely in their "mid-20s to late-30s" with numerous couples. Richard Abowitz of the Las Vegas Weekly said in 2005 that Fantasy is a high-speed show geared towards "bleary-eyed tourists". Travel writers Bob Sehlinger and Seth Kubersky said in 2023 that although the show touches on the sensual topics of bondage, dominatrix, and lesbianism, it does not ever have X-rated content. He speculated that this accounted for the high number of women in attendance.

== Costumes ==
Richard Abowitz of the Las Vegas Weekly found in 2005 that the outfits were not notably distinctive but still effectively emphasize the dancers' figures. The Las Vegas Review-Journal reviewer Mike Weatherford in 2000 assessed the red cowgirl outfits worn by the dancers during the "Man! I Feel Like A Woman!" act as resembling something spectators would see at Six Flags. Noting the dancers in every act were clad in uniform outfits and wigs, he said that made them like "interlocking droids" who were blocked from showcasing any personal style or sex appeal. Fantasy in 2023 had outfits designed to evoke sexual fantasies with performers dressed as cowgirls, schoolgirls, and businesswomen. The outfits were combined with lingerie and skin-revealing burlesque attire. In a throwback to classic burlesque, the women wore corsets, fishnet, gloves, and glittering shirts as well as lace and leather. The dancers' bras in the initial scene in 2024 were ornamented with 2,000 rhinestones. During each show, every cast member swaps her earrings and necklaces nine times. By the show's 25th anniversary in 2024, the performers had put on over 91,000 eyelashes, donned 8,730 fishnet pairs, and changed outfits 910,000 times.

== Choreography ==
Midnight Fantasy was choreographed by Tiger Martina. According to Michael Paskevich of the Las Vegas Review-Journal, other choreographers hold Martina's dance maneuvers in high esteem. His dance routines are difficult for dances aspiring to go beyond "heel-toe, heel-toe, spin then smile". The performers' arm and hand movements necessitate accurate synchronization among the ensemble. Paskevich praised the leadership of the show's founding head dancer, Jennifer Young, and founding floor captain Dejah Juarez, saying that they seemed proficient in executing diverse choreographic styles. Paskevich said a dance segment inspired by James Bond was a "well-lighted and unusual dance scene" and was an "energized audience interaction segment" more akin to The Blues Brothers than Bond. He noted in a 1999 review that the production choreographer was making continuous adjustments to dance routines to increase the visual flair of "topless dancers who can really dance". Las Vegas Review-Journal reviewer Mike Weatherford said in 2000 that with Martina's high-energy dance routines, the show stayed vibrant and entertaining though it minimized erotic undertones. It remained too fast-paced to become sultry, he stated.

Lonely Planet writer Scott Doggett said in 2003 that several of the dance acts give off the vibe of cheerleading performances. In a 2004 review of the show, the Las Vegas Sun's Jerry Fink lauded Martina for masterfully creating dance sequences that showcase the dancers' physical attributes without crossing into indecency. He found the dancers to be very skillful in performing the choreography. According to Fink, the choreography is "so fine tuned" that each movement is meticulously designed. Whereas dancers in other theatrical offerings were robotic, the Midnight Fantasy performers' moves were "natural and fluid", he stated.

When the show was renamed to Fantasy in 2005, the choreographers Cris Judd and Eddie Garcia were enlisted to revise the dance routines. Calling the revised choreography "fast-paced", the Las Vegas Weekly's Richard Abowitz said it had rapid movements and "MTV-style moves". Mike Weatherford of the Las Vegas Review-Journal in 2008 praised Judd and Garcia's choreography. He said that without seeming overly forced, the dancers performed with intent while remaining aligned with the main objective. The choreographer Mandy Moore was enlisted in 2015 to create a new dance routine for the show's first number. She choreographed the show's last act (set to Justin Timberlake's "Can't Stop the Feeling!) and another act in 2016. Of doing choreography for a topless show, Moore called it a "different aesthetic" and said, "You want to make sure you're being respectful of the girls and how they move."

Matt Kelemen of Las Vegas Magazine lauded the dancers' "flawlessly executed moves" in 2021, stating they are "more dancers who are topless than topless dancers". The show in 2023 had aerial dances, pole dances, and salsa. Saying the show had "Broadway-caliber choreography", Las Vegas Magazine reviewer Kiki Miyasoto praised the performers' "athleticism, dance skills and siren-like ability to turn on even the most prudish".

== Marketing ==
Each Fantasy cast member had a MySpace page in 2008. The production created a cast recording and sells calendars containing photos of the cast. The calendars are released in October every year when Fantasy commemorates its anniversary. The photos featured each in sensual, provocative poses with varying degrees of clothing. Sales exceeded 50,000 calendars for the 2008 edition set by the swimming pool. Filming for the 2009 edition required two days, each lasting 12 hours, during which several thousand photos were taken. For up to an hour during parts of the photoshoot, the women had to maintain the same position. In the 2019 edition of the calendar, the cast used gold tape to obscure parts of themselves. For the 2023 edition of the calendar, the Fantasy dancers collaborated for the first time with fellow Luxor performer Carrot Top at the Liberace Museum Collection. By the show's 25th anniversary in 2024, 168 Fantasy performers had participated in 14 calendar photo shoots.

As part of its marketing approach, the show elevates its entertainers as "stars" rather than unnamed performers. Each year during its anniversary, Fantasy hosts the press and former performers for a yearly commemoration of the show's longevity. This is part of the show's promotional strategy to host events to attract media attention. The performers appear in local events and philanthropy functions. Each year, the performers participate in 135 promotional events. The show's public relations is handled by Wicked Creative, and it does many joint activities with the male revue Thunder from Down Under.

== Comparison to other shows ==
Las Vegas Weekly writer Mark Adams said that Folies Bergere at the Tropicana and Lido de Paris at the Stardust set the stage for several dozen women revues like Fantasy. The Las Vegas Sun's Joe Delaney said the Crazy Girls revue, which premiered in 1987 at the Riviera, set the stage for other shows like Fantasy, Harrah's Skintight, and Plaza's Naked Angels. Comparing Fantasy to Crazy Girls, Delaney called the former "higher in quality and lower in excitement value". The newspaper's Jerry Fink said Fantasy is an "earthy" show that focuses on the current moment, while the revue Jubilee! reflects on Las Vegas's earlier days. Other topless shows in Las Vegas were Bottoms Up at the Riviera and the Flamingo and New Frontier's Femme Magique.

Mike Weatherford of the Las Vegas Review-Journal in 2000 said Fantasy was the "most accomplished" though the "least naughty" of four topless shows (the other three shows were Crazy Girls, Skintight, and Naked Angels). In 2001, he said that topless shows were split into two groups. Whereas Fantasy and Skintight had high-end outfits, live vocals, and dancing, Crazy Girls and Naked Angels were "more overtly erotic" in their striptease acts. Weatherford in 2004 compared Fantasy with Club Seven's Men, The Show, noting that both featured a bed in a scene and a rendition of "You Can Leave Your Hat On". In 2008, he stated that Fantasy's primary rival was Crazy Horse Paris of MGM Grand, which is owned by the same parent company. Weatherford commented that while Fantasy featured women who are "Americanized" and "individualized", Crazy Horse Paris was "all stylized and sleekly European with its aloof, symmetrically matched dancers".

Weatherford said in 2010 that the contrast in vibe between Fantasy and Crazy Horse is evident. In Crazy Horse, live vocals and audience interaction are both absent. In Fantasy, the performers leave the stage and engage with an audience member whom they make an Elvis Presley imitator. That year, he compared the Westin Casuarina's Burlesque --The Show with Fantasy, saying the former was produced on a tight budget so chose to revert to the original style. According to Weatherford, Burlesque and Fantasy illustrated the direct development of a genre that beginning in the 1950s has been part of the Strip scene.

In 2016, Weatherford said that the topless shows Fantasy and X Burlesque had a long lifespan. While Fantasy had started 17 year priors, Flamingo's X Burlesque had started 14 years prior. Weatherford said the shows both featured the comic relief commonly associated with Las Vegas in its earlier years as well as performers dressed in cowgirl hats and Daisy Dukes. According to Weatherford, the shows have lasted so long because each is staged in a distinct venue and has tuned its tone to match the setting. Fantasy is presented in a real theater where the seating arrangement adds a perceived separation from the performs. Lorena Peril, the singer and presenter, and the comedian Sean E. Cooper bridge that divide. X Burlesque is different, Weatherford said, in that it is set in a low-level cabaret containing a stripper pole and a "pod stage". This places the audience members in close proximity. Weatherford found that X Burlesque is a higher-tech show than Fantasy in using projection mapping and a fake snow device.

Angelica Bridges was chosen as Fantasy's vocalist and host in 2009. Richard Abowitz of the Las Vegas Sun compared the selection to other Las Vegas adult productions shows that also had celebrity hosts. Holly Madison and Aubrey O'Day of Peepshow and Bridges all had appeared in Playboy magazine. MGM Grand's Crazy Horse Paris enlisted the celebrities Dita Von Teese and Carmen Electra. Fodor's said in 2020 that Fantasy is "the least strip club–like of the Las Vegas topless revues".

== Reception ==
In a 1999 review when Midnight Fantasy opened, the Las Vegas Review-Journal reviewer Michael Paskevich gave the show a C+, finding it to be overly reliant on "old school" attributes. He said that this could deprive a top-notch production of unexpected twists, improvisation, and the feeling of novelty the show delivers to its category. Paskevich wished the show was more innovative, writing, "hipper music and edgier moves, wigs that don't look like hairy shower caps, and doses of mirth would lighten the mood and make Midnight Fantasy seem less of a breastfest." He criticized the inclusion of the songs "Some Like It Hot" and "Sexual Healing" for contributing minimal zest and did not like the other "weak double-entendre taped setups" later in the show in a cowboy sequence. Paskevich praised the show's choreography and the dancers, writing, "Their collective talent and, yes, their quality bodies, are the best things going for a show that lacks punch and a sense of humor that would prove of great benefit."

In a mixed review in the month Midnight Fantasy debuted, Joe Delaney of the Las Vegas Sun wrote, "Good taste and excellent performance and production values notwithstanding, we still had in-your-face T&A from start to finish. Just a little subtlety, a touch of humor would have mitigated it somewhat." The writers Larry Ludmer and Avery Cardoza liked the dancers' "grace and talent" but criticized how the production missed "elaborate staging". Las Vegas Sun's Jerry Fink praised the show during its five-year anniversary in 2004, saying, that it is not missing "any of its energy or sex appeal". Fink called the costumes "sexy", the dance sequences "tantalizing", and the show "classy", concluding that the producer "knows how to walk the line between sleaze and cheesecake". He said the show's principal defect was the performers' lip syncing. After the MGM Mirage acquisition of Luxor prompted the show to be revamped in 2005 to attract younger viewers, Fink said Fantasy went from "one of the best choreographed, sexiest shows" to a show that had lost its glamour.

The Las Vegas Review-Journal reviewer Mike Weatherford gave the show a B− in 2008, writing that a major asset is "it's both a show and a booby show, with neither suffering as a result". He gave the show a B in 2010, stating, "Sex sells Fantasy, but personality delivers it. Steve Friess of the Los Angeles Times penned a negative review of the show, writing, "the women seemed to be trying too hard to seem sexy", "the sets were uninspired", and the singer Angelica Bridges did not perform well in singing or connecting with viewers. Travel writers Bob Sehlinger and Seth Kubersky gave Fantasy three stars, saying that it showcases "a tasteful, glamorous smorgasbord of sexual scenarios" and has "high-quality production values—from script to set design to sound".

The entertainment reporter Robin Leach listed Fantasy among five shows to watch, dubbing them as "the fabulous femmes fatales of Fantasy". In a negative review, National Review writer Jonah Goldberg in 2002 said, "Now, when it comes to topless women, one need not be an 'if you've seen two, you've seen 'em all' kind of guy to find this show relentlessly boring." USA Today reviewer Gene Sloan penned a mixed review, praising the impressionist for a "dead-on" mimicry of Sammy Davis Jr. and an "impressive" one of Michael Jackson. He criticized the choreography for sometimes "fall[ing] flat" and found many of the acts lacked sensuality. Travel Weekly reviewer praised the show, liking "the refreshing way this show combines sexiness and fun, never taking itself too seriously".

The Las Vegas Magazine named Fantasy to its "Hall of Fame" in 2021, praising "its successful formula: a cast of beautiful and talented dancers, a powerhouse host and vocalist, and just the right amount of scintillating and sexual tease". Afar said the show's topless entertainers are experienced dancers and singers who provide "good entertainment far beyond the lure of skin". Haute Living reviewer Tita Carra liked how the show catered to a diversity of audience members and praised the skilled dancing. She called the show, "Fantasy sexy, hilarious, fun, and in many other ways surprising."
