= Lisa Alvarado (comedian) =

Peruvian-American comedian

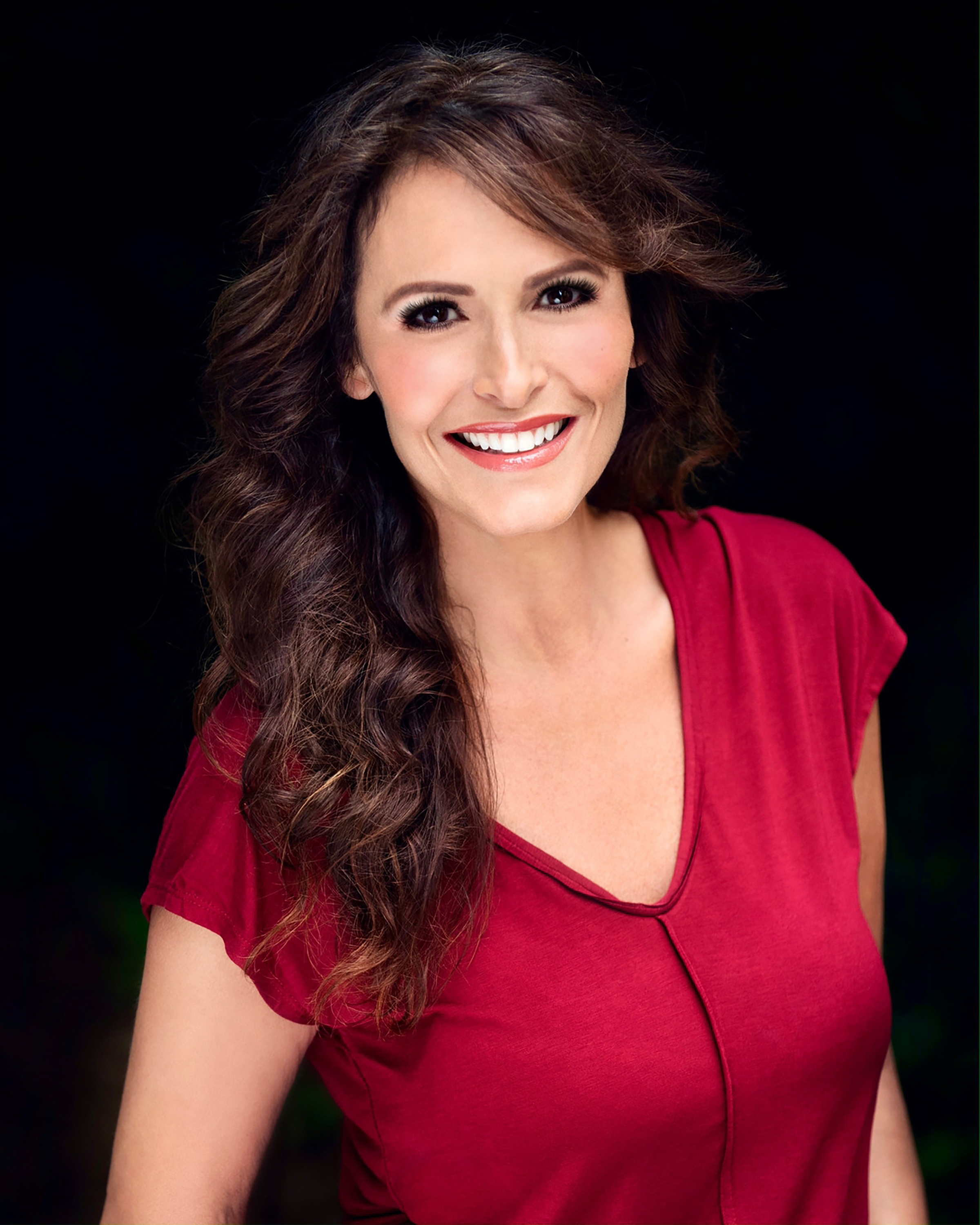
- Lisa Alvarado Headshot
- Born: Chicago, Illinois, U.S.
- Occupations: Comedian; writer; producer
- Children: 1
- Website: lisaalvarado.com

Lisa Alvarado is an American stand-up comedian, born to Peruvian immigrant parents and raised in Chicago, Illinois.

== Early life ==
Lisa Alvarado is Latina, first generation of her family born in Chicago, and knew she wanted to be a comedian at an early age. She would play "Make Me Laugh" after school with all the neighborhood kids. As a child, while watching a stand-up comedian on TV, Alvarado was fascinated how it would bring her family together. "A comedian can do that?," Lisa will say, "That's what I want to do. Comedy is just so healing."

== Career ==
Alvarado began by touring and performing improv comedy for six years before taking a comedy class and then moving to Los Angeles to pursue her career. In 2001, Alvarado was a semi-finalist in the Comedy Central Laugh Riots competition. Alvarado would base some of her early material on life experiences as a Latina single mom, dating and being a female working in the male-dominant business of stand-up. In 2003, she competed on the first season of NBC's Last Comic Standing and worked her way to the semi-finals. In 2006, Alvarado was the placed second in Nick at Nite's "The Search for the Funniest Mom in America 2". In 2007, joined Sinbad (comedian) and a roster of "top Christian humorists" for "Thou Shalt Laugh 3." Other TV Appearances include Comedy.tv, Comics Unleashed with Byron Allon, “StandUp in Stilettos” on TV Guide Network, and "Stand Up & Deliver!" on NuvoTV (formally SíTV). Alvarado also played Paul Rodriguez's sidekick for 10 episodes of Mis Videos Locos with Paul Rodriguez on the MTV Tres Network in 2011. She continued to hone her skills locally in comedy clubs like The Laugh Factory, Ice House Comedy Club and Flappers Comedy Club, and to tour the world in colleges, corporate events, cruise ships and military tours.

In 2011, after 10 years in the business, Alvarado went to her hometown of Chicago to film and produce her first comedy special. Taking advantage of the popularity of streaming creative content, she created three original web series, winning “Best Actress in a Web Series” and “Best Comedy Web Series” Finalist at the Official Latino Short Film Festival.

In 2017, Alvarado was hired by Entertainment Studios, as a Content Producer/Staff Writer for “Funny You Should Ask” for 130 episodes, while continuing to perform stand-up in various clubs around California. After a show in San Diego, she encountered a gentleman with Primary lateral sclerosis (PLS), a condition similar to ALS. His final wish was to perform stand-up comedy, so Alvarado gathered some of her closest comedian friends together to help him accomplish this dream. Through her own production company, Alvarado released a documentary, about their journey together and the "healing power of comedy" entitled “Don’t Wait: The Michael Schmid Story." With her production company, it is Alvarado's goal to empower other women and ethnically diverse creators and storytellers.

In 2021, along with Danny Trejo, Paul Rodriguez, Steve Treviño, Jessica Keenan, Carlos Santos, and Emilio Rivera, Alvarado was one of the featured comedians at the HA! Comedy Festival, airing on HBO Max. Also released in 2021 is her Dry Bar Comedy special.

== Filmography ==
=== TV appearances ===
- Last Comic Standing (2003) S1 Semi-Finalist
- Latino Laugh Festival, The Show (2004) S1:E29
- Nick at Nite’s “The Search for the Funniest Mom in America 2" (2006) All 6 Episodes
- Comedy.tv (2009) S1:E4 Host:Whitney Cummings
- Comics Unleashed (2007) S1:E95 Lisa Alvarado; Tammy Pescatelli; Margaret Cho; Sheryl Underwood
- Mis Videos Locos with Paul Rodriguez on MTV Tr3 (2010–2011) 10 Episodes
- StandUp in Stilettos (2012) S1:E03 Retta, Lisa Alvarado, and Lisa Sunstedt
- Stand Up and Deliver! S1:E104 (2013)

=== Discography (comedy) ===
- Best of Comics Unleashed with Byron Allen
- Thou Shalt Laugh 3 (2008)
- Lisa Alvarado:The Real LA Comedy Special (2011)

=== Streaming Content ===
- The Bitchlorette's Web Series (2012) All 7 Episodes
- Single Mom Comic Who Holds Nothing Back! (2013) Ep6 CafeMom Comedy Club
- Dryin' Up Web Series (2018)
- Palin Unplugged A Late-night talk show format Web Series (2020- )
- Lisa Alvarado: The Real LA Comedy Special (2011)
- Dry Bar Comedy Special
