= Anita Mann =

American choreographer, dancer and actress (b. 1946)

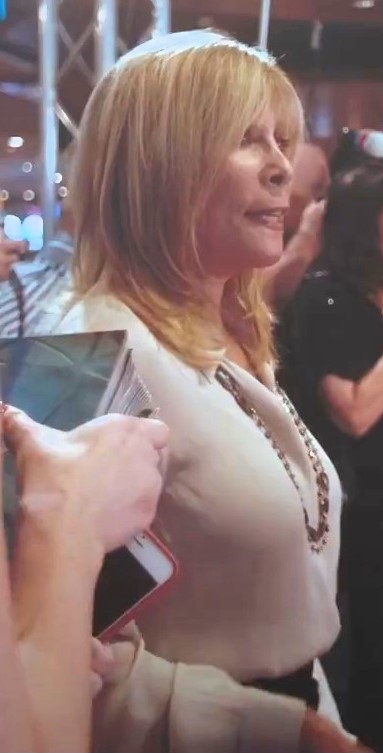
- Mann in 2015
- Born: October 21, 1946 (age 78); Detroit, Michigan, U.S.
- Occupation(s): Choreographer, dancer, actress
- Website: www.anitamannproductions.com

Anita Mann (born October 21, 1946) is an American choreographer, dancer and actress. Mann has been honored by the Academy of Television Arts and Sciences as one of America's top five contemporary choreographers. She is also the recipient of five Emmy Awards and accolades from every corner of the industry.

== Biography ==
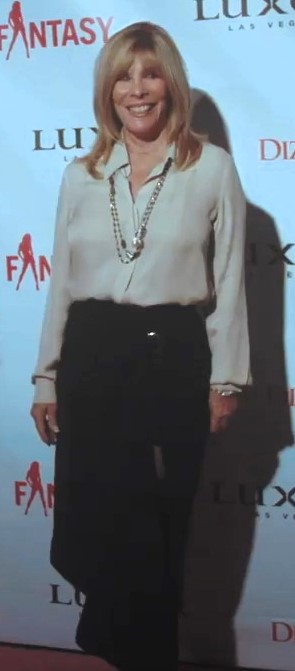
Mann in 2015

Mann began her career as one of the David Winters' dancers on TV shows such as Shindig!, The T.A.M.I. Show and Monte Carlo: C'est La Rose, a Grace Kelly documentary special. She has danced with and choreographed for Elvis Presley, Lucille Ball, Michael Jackson, Davy Jones and countless other stars, while maintaining a four-decade relationship with all the major networks.

Her major choreography credits include five seasons on the 1980s pop dance television show Solid Gold, for which she was nominated twice for a Primetime Emmy Awards for Outstanding Choreography, and "The Muppets Go Hollywood", for which she was nominated for her first Primetime Emmy Award for Outstanding Choreography.

Mann has also choreographed "The Cher Show", "The Jacksons", "The Academy Awards", the "Golden Globe Award", "Academy of Country Music Awards", the "Miss America Pageant" (which earned her her first Primetime Emmy Award for Outstanding Choreography), "The People's Choice Awards", the "Grammy Hall of Fame Award", the "Emmy Awards", "The Jerry Lewis MDA Telethon" (which earned her another nomination for a Primetime Emmy Award for Outstanding Choreography), "The Great Muppet Caper", "Dick Clark's American Bandstand Live", "Sesame Street Live", "The Mighty Morphin Power Ranger Tour", "Snoopy's World of Magic", "Arthur Live Tour" as well as countless other live, film and television shows.

Mann is the producer of the long-running Las Vegas hit show Fantasy at the Luxor Las Vegas. She was the coordinating producer for the TV Series "Dirty Dancing" which Lionsgate produced for the WE tv. She has worked with Comcast on their "Get Up and Dance" and "Rock 'n Roll Fantasy Camp" series available at Comcast In Demand. Mann is also the producer of the pre-school animated musical webisode series itty bitty HeartBeats, recently re-launched and distributed by TV3 Global, as well as the musical "Imagine This" at the New London Theatre in London's West End.

== Selected choreography ==
- The Monkees (1968)
- Here's Lucy (1968-1971)
- Solid Gold (1986)
