= Carole Montgomery =

American standup comedian, writer, producer, director and actress

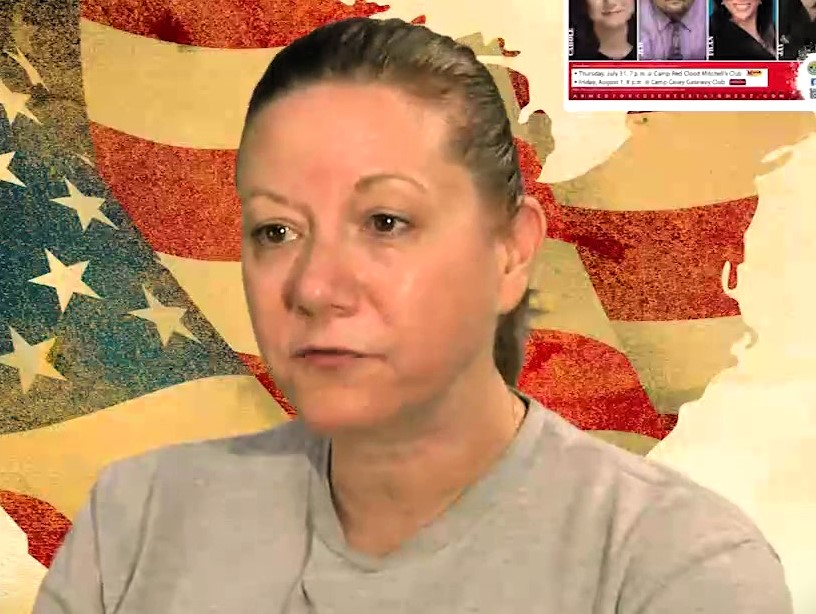
Montgomery at Camp Walker, South Korea in 2014

Carole Montgomery is an American standup comedian, writer, producer, director and actress.

== Early life ==
Montgomery was born April 19, 1958, in Brooklyn, New York, where she lived until she moved into Manhattan in the early 1980s.

== Career ==
In her early career she performed in various comedy clubs in the NYC area including the legendary Catch a Rising Star and Who's on First, both now shuttered. In 1987 she made the move out to Los Angeles with her husband Todd. It is in LA that Montgomery's television appearances started to multiply. She has been featured in over 2 dozen television shows, including Showtime's Comedy All Stars 6 with Don Rickles and Politically Incorrect with Bill Maher.

In 1992 she had her only child, a son, James Layne Montgomery. Soon after, while she was playing at The Riviera Comedy Club in Las Vegas, she was asked to step in to the Las Vegas revue Crazy Girls which turned into a 5-year run. She was then asked to join Midnight Fantasy at the Luxor Hotel where she remained for three years. During her time in Las Vegas, Montgomery wrote and performed her one-woman show Confessions of a PT&A Mom in various theatres.

In 2006 she returned to NYC with her family. That year she was one of 10 contestants on Nick at Nite's The Search for the Funniest Mom in America reality competition. She has also appeared on Comics Unleashed with Byron Allen, and on the TV Guide Network's Standup in Stilettos.

Montgomery was also a co-producer of the NY Underground Comedy Festival which in its heyday was dedicated to furthering the art of standup comedy.

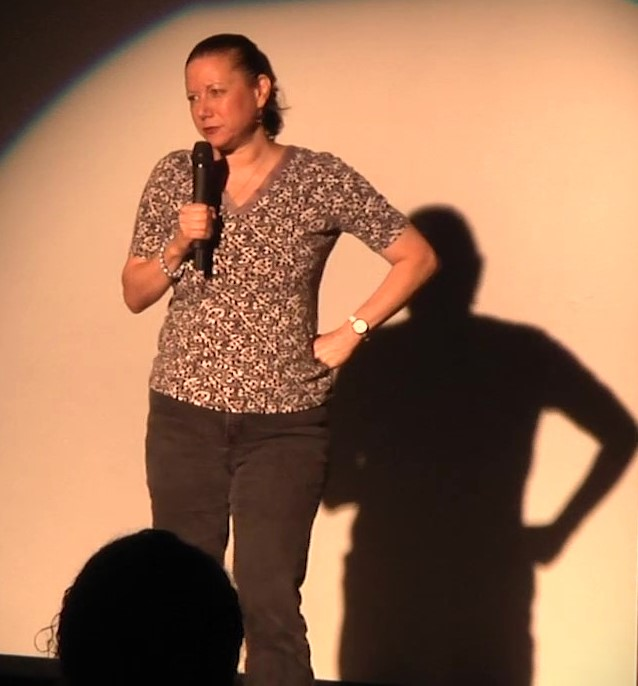
Montgomery doing standup at Camp Walker in 2014

In 2010 Montgomery joined forces with Armed Forces Entertainment to bring comedy overseas to the US military. She has been to over a dozen countries including Iraq, Kuwait, Bahrain, Haiti, Honduras, Djibouti and Kosovo. On her overseas tours, she refers to herself as the "NATIONAL MOM".

Montgomery has directed and developed solo performance shows including Jim Florentine's I'm Your Savior and The Lighter Side Of Death by Jim Mendrinos. More recently she was supervising producer on two television specials: Shang is Shangry and Paul Ogata: All Lies.

Her most recent project, Funny Women of A Certain Age, premiered on the Showtime Network in March 2019. It made history as the first TV comedy special to feature female comics over the age of 50. It was the network's highest rated comedy special that year. Two other specials More Funny Women of a Certain Age and EVEN More Funny Women of a Certain Age have aired. All three original specials were rereleased in March 2025 by Comedy Dynamics.

She has also been a blogger for the Huffington Post.
