= Ophira Eisenberg =

Canadian American comedian, writer, and actress

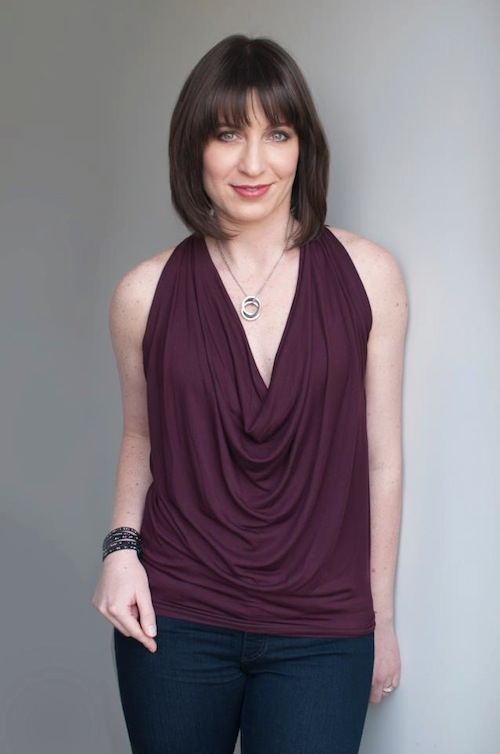
- Born: 1972 (age 53–54); Calgary, Alberta, Canada
- Spouse: Jonathan Baylis
- Children: 1

Comedy career
- Years active: 1998–present
- Medium: Stand-up, film, TV, radio
- Website: ophiraeisenberg.com

Ophira Eisenberg (born 1972) is a Canadian American comedian, writer, and actress. She is from Calgary, Alberta. She has been living in New York City since 2001 and obtained American citizenship in April 2021.

Eisenberg hosted the weekly NPR and WNYC trivia, puzzle, and game show Ask Me Another, with the "one-man house band" Jonathan Coulton. In 2013, she appeared on the Late Late Show with Craig Ferguson. She also appeared on Comedy Central's Premium Blend and Fresh Faces of Comedy, as well as VH-1's Best Week Ever All Access, the E! Channel, the Oxygen Network, the Discovery Channel, TV Guide Channel's Standup in Stilettos, and the AXS Network.

== Career ==
=== Stand-up comedy and storytelling ===
Eisenberg performs regularly in New York City. She frequently hosts and tours with The Moth, a storytelling show, and is featured on one of their Audience Favorites CDs.

She was featured in the New York Times' "Telling Tales With a Tear and a Smile," New York magazine's "Ten New Comedians That Funny People Find Funny", New York Post's "The 50 Best Bits That Crack Up Pro Comics", selected by Backstage magazine as one of "10 Standout Stand Ups Worth Watching" in their Spotlight on Comedy Issue, and hailed as a "Highly Recommended Favorite" by Time Out New York magazine. She was a MAC Awards (Manhattan Association of Clubs and Cabarets) Finalist for Best Female Comic in 2009.

=== Writing ===
Her debut memoir, Screw Everyone: Sleeping My Way to Monogamy was released 2 April 2013. She has also been featured in a number of anthology books, including: I Killed: True Stories of the Road from America's Top Comics alongside Dennis Miller, Joan Rivers, Chris Rock, and Jerry Seinfeld; Rejected: Tales of the Failed, Dumped, and Canceled; Heeb Magazine's Sex, Drugs and Gefilte Fish (2010); and Eating Salad Drunk: Haikus for the Burnout Age by Comedy Greats (2022) alongside Margaret Cho, Ray Romano, Roy Wood Jr., and Maria Bamford.

=== Acting ===
Her acting credits include The Overlookers (winner of Best Picture at the Canadian Film Festival and Best Feature Film at the New York International Independent Film & Video Festival), Showtime's Queer as Folk, and CBS's The Guardian. She was also in the original Toronto Fringe production of The Drowsy Chaperone in 1999, which later became a Tony Award-winning Broadway show.

== Personal life ==
Eisenberg lives in an apartment in Brooklyn, New York City, with her husband, Jonathan Baylis (a writer-producer-editor and comic creator of So Buttons Comix) and their son Lucas. She is Jewish and a breast cancer survivor. She is half Dutch, from her mother who came from Nijmegen.
