= Ask Me Another (radio program) =

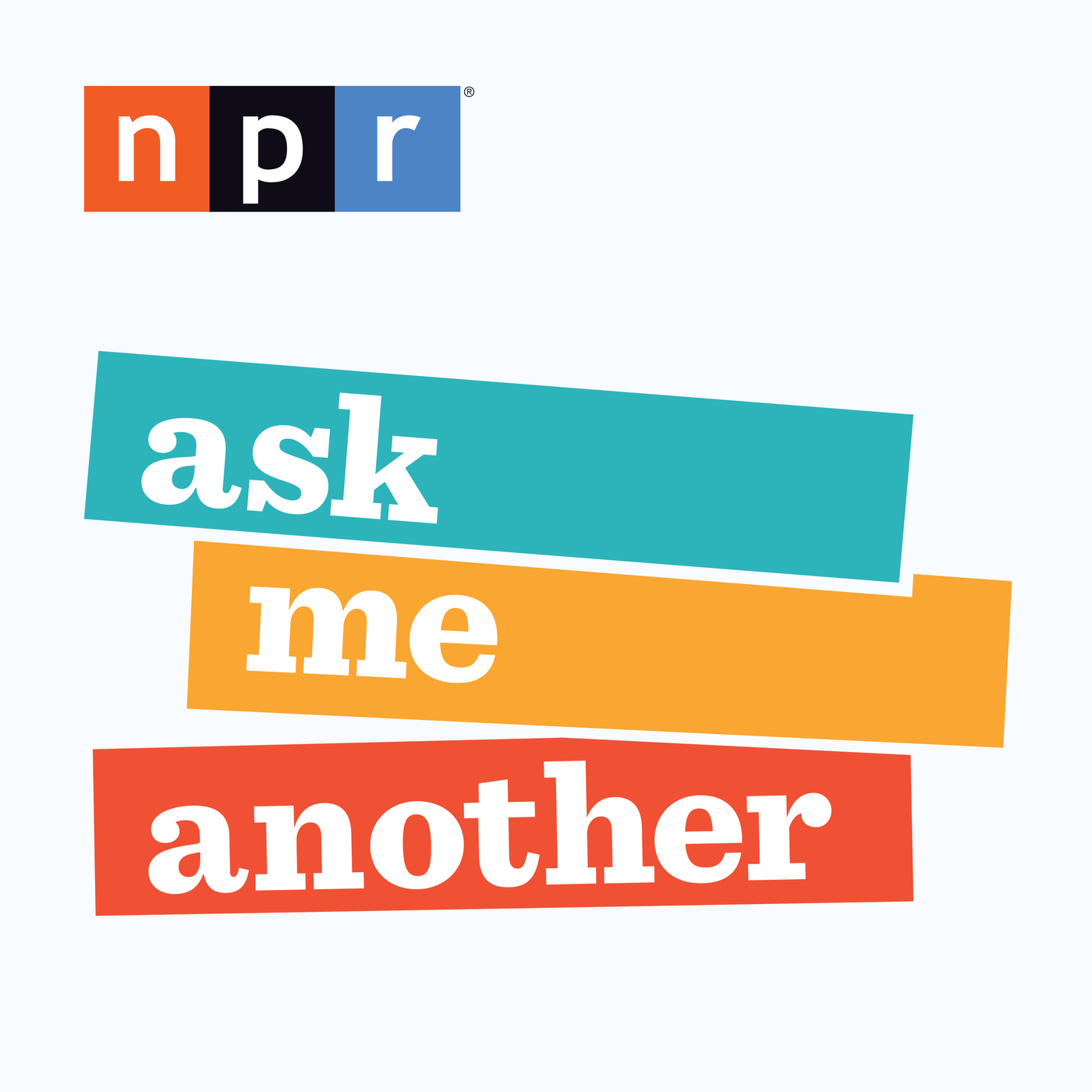
- Running time: 47-53 minutes
- Hosted by: Ophira Eisenberg
- Announcer: Jonathan Coulton
- Created by: John Chaneski; Shawn Kennedy
- Produced by: Travis Larchuk
- Original release: May 4, 2012 – September 24, 2021
- No. of series: 10
- No. of episodes: 262
- Website: www.npr.org/programs/ask-me-another

Ask Me Another is an hour-long radio puzzle game show produced by WNYC Studios and National Public Radio that aired from 2012 until 2021. It was hosted by Canadian American comedian Ophira Eisenberg and featured independent rock musician Jonathan Coulton as its "house musician" or "one-man house band". Episodes of the show were usually recorded at The Bell House in Brooklyn, New York, but the show also went to various states across the country and recorded one or more episodes from those locations. During the COVID-19 pandemic in the United States, the show continued taping episodes from the homes of the participants, without a studio audience, but returned to The Bell House for the series finale.

262 full episodes of Ask Me Another aired across 10 seasons, as well as twelve "Favourites" episodes compiling games from prior weeks, and a re-airing of the show's premiere episode with new content in honor of the show's fifth anniversary, though only completely new episodes were officially numbered. "AMA Bonus" clips were frequently uploaded between seasons 2 and 6 featuring clips from recent episode tapings, including excerpts from aired episodes, interview segments and games that didn't make it to air, and musical performances. Season 1 aired for 13 episodes weekly from May-July 2012, with further seasons airing year-round from January 2013 onward, featuring 25-30 new episodes a year peppered with re-airings.

== Format ==
The show featured four to five individual games based on puzzle topics, wordplay, and trivia, interspersed with chatter from the show's hosts, as well as a segment featuring an interview and one or more games involving the celebrity guest of the week.

Most games were played by two contestants, with the rules of each game explained to the contestants beforehand. Players rung in (Player 1 would ring in by ringing a bell once to respond, while Player 2 would ring their bell two times) with the general goal to score the most points in that game. In episodes through July 2016, contestants played one round apiece to determine who advanced to the final round, but starting in August 2016, episodes had four contestants each, paired into two separate rounds of two games each. Whichever player had the most points accumulated after the second game moved on to the final round, and in the case of a tie after the second game, a final tie-breaker question would be asked to settle the tie.

In the original format, the winning player would proceed with all other winners to the "Ask Me One More" final round at the end of the show (select games featuring celebrity guests also qualified here). This last game was a series of trivia questions with answers sharing a common theme, such as answers that all included the name of a musical instrument. This round was played in a spelling bee style: if one contestant did not know the answer, the next one in line could attempt to answer the same question, and if one player got the answer, all who missed it would be eliminated. This was played until either one player remained, or, if the show ran out of questions, the winner would be whoever could ring in first and correctly answer a final tie-breaking question. The prize for winning this round was typically a small bit of memorabilia provided by the week's Very Important Puzzler, but generally of low monetary value.

Other games were played by the show's celebrity guest of the week, originally called the "Very Important Puzzler". The guest typically played for a contestant who had registered either via the show's website or through its social media pages. Any celebrity guest who won their specific game would win either an Ask Me Another anagram t-shirt or Rubik's Cube for him/herself and the contestant. In season 1, Very Important Puzzlers were treated as "mystery guests" with clues progressively dropped early in the episode before they were revealed prior to their interview.

From August 2016-December 2019, the two contestants who won their rounds would move on to play a final round, where they were each asked eight questions on a common theme. The contestants alternated answering questions. Halfway through, the scores were reviewed. The second half of the round proceeded soccer shoot-out style: after a contestant answered a question correctly or incorrectly, leaving it mathematically impossible for one of the contestants to win the round, the final round would end immediately (without the remaining questions even being asked) and the winner would be announced. If the score was tied at the end of the final round, a final tie-breaker question would be asked to settle the tie. For most of the final eight live episodes, the final round format was changed, allowing contestants to bank up to 3 points by running through multiple categories, with the other contestant able to steal if there was an incorrect response, with the first to 8 points winning. In either format, the prize awarded to the winner was an Ask Me Another Rubik's Cube autographed by that episode's celebrity guest(s).

Due to the COVID-19 pandemic, the final 51 episodes of Ask Me Another from March 2020-September 2021 did not feature regular civilian contestants or a competitive format, and instead featured games with remote interview guests by telephone or over Zoom.

=== Types of games ===
Though the show's writers designed many kinds of games, there were some commonly recurring types, including:

- Rhyming games, in which the contestants would be asked to provide answers that rhyme with a catchphrase provided at the beginning of the game. (Example: Contestants' answers must rhyme, sort of, with the 300 tagline "This is Sparta", so an answer identifying a British constitutional document from the time of King John would be "This is Magna Carta.")
- Musical games in which the in-house musician sang clues, either based in the words sung or the music itself, and the contestants were asked to determine the meaning of those clues. (Example: Contestants' answers must identify an American state, so an answer identifying a song with lyrical clues about a "flat land" set to "Dust in the Wind" by the group Kansas must correctly identify the state in question as Kansas.) In most versions of this game, the contestant could earn one point for answering the subject question and an additional bonus point for correctly identifying the song used or the artist who originally performed it.
- "This, that or the other", a recurring "classic" game in which an item was announced and the contestants were asked to identify under which of three categories the item is properly classed. (Example: Contestants must identify whether the strange-sounding word "Quark" is a cheese, a dance move, or a character from Moby Dick. Quark is a cheese.)
- Mashup games, in which two concepts were invoked by one clue and the contestant would have to correctly supply the mashed-together concepts. (Example: A mashup game combining candy names and celebrity names could query contestants to combine the name of a nutty candy with the name of a co-host of The View. That would be "Almond Joy Behar", a combination of Almond Joy and Joy Behar.)
- Word games, in which letters of a word provided in a clue would be rearranged or altered in order to provide the answer for contestants to supply. (Example: A game called "Beheading" could involve contestants taking a "sword" and cutting off its head to arrive at "word", which is "sword" without its initial "s".)
- "Very Important Puzzler" games, in which either characteristics of the show's guest star were explored or the guest star's own abilities were put to a test. Often, these games were played not by show contestants but by the guest stars themselves, but some saw them go head to head with a civilian contestant or an ardent fan of theirs.
- Phone games, in which a contestant was not physically present at the show's recording facilities but played over the telephone. Because it would more difficult for such a contestant to participate against another player or in the final game at the end of the show with several players, these contestants played individually, winning a prize if they responded correctly to a sufficient number of questions. These games were no longer played in later episodes of the series.
- "Fact Bag", in which Eisenberg gave harder trivia questions for Coulton to figure out the answer to, as drawn from a bag on set.
- "Mystery Guest", in which Eisenberg and Coulton try to guess the identity of a guest, typically not a celebrity but someone whose day job or skill is unique or notable. This differs from the season 1 usage of V.I.P. "mystery guests".

=== Guests ===
Guest stars on the show were originally referred to as "Very Important Puzzlers", and typically participated in two segments on the show. Episodes after May 2016 dropped the moniker, though it was brought back in the show's final episodes for retrospective games. Guest stars included:

- Uzo Aduba
- Brad Bird
- Lewis Black
- Alex Borstein
- Tituss Burgess
- Anna Chlumsky
- Sutton Foster
- Neil Gaiman
- Elizabeth Gilbert
- Lake Street Dive
- Bobby Lopez and Kristen Anderson-Lopez
- Sonia Manzano and Emilio Delgado of Sesame Street
- Ingrid Michaelson
- Danny Pudi
- Dan Savage
- Peter Segal
- Andy Serkis
- Curtis Sittenfeld
- Patrick Stewart
- Meg Wolitzer
- They Might Be Giants
- Writers of the podcast Welcome to Night Vale

=== The show's "anagrammed ending" ===
The show typically ended with host Eisenberg reading the credits identifying people who worked on the show. Some of the names she read were translated by the show's participating puzzle guru into anagrams. Typically, the puzzle guru would announce at the beginning "Hey, my name anagrams to..." and then announce the anagram. As Eisenberg listed others that worked on the show, the puzzle guru would interject the anagrammed forms of their names as well. Eisenberg then signed off the show by announcing that she was "Her ripe begonias" (an anagram for her own name). Occasionally, for comic effect, the puzzle guru would also provide an anagram for the call letters of WNYC ("CNYW").

Some examples of anagrams presented in the show's ending sequence included:

Role on Show	Original Name	Anagram of Name
Host	Ophira Eisenberg	"Her ripe begonias."
House Musician	Jonathan Coulton	"Thou jolt a cannon."
Puzzle Guru	Art Chung	"Narc thug."
Puzzle Guru	John Chaneski	"Oh heck, ninjas."
Puzzle Guru	Greg Pliska	"Sparkle gig."
Puzzle Guru	Will Hines	"Hells, I win."
Guest Musician	Julian Velard	"Naive dull jar."
Venue	The Bell House	"Hot heel blues."

== Cast ==
=== Host ===
Ophira Eisenberg hosted every episode of Ask Me Another except for two in January 2016, in which journalist and actress Faith Salie filled in as guest host.

=== Puzzle Gurus ===
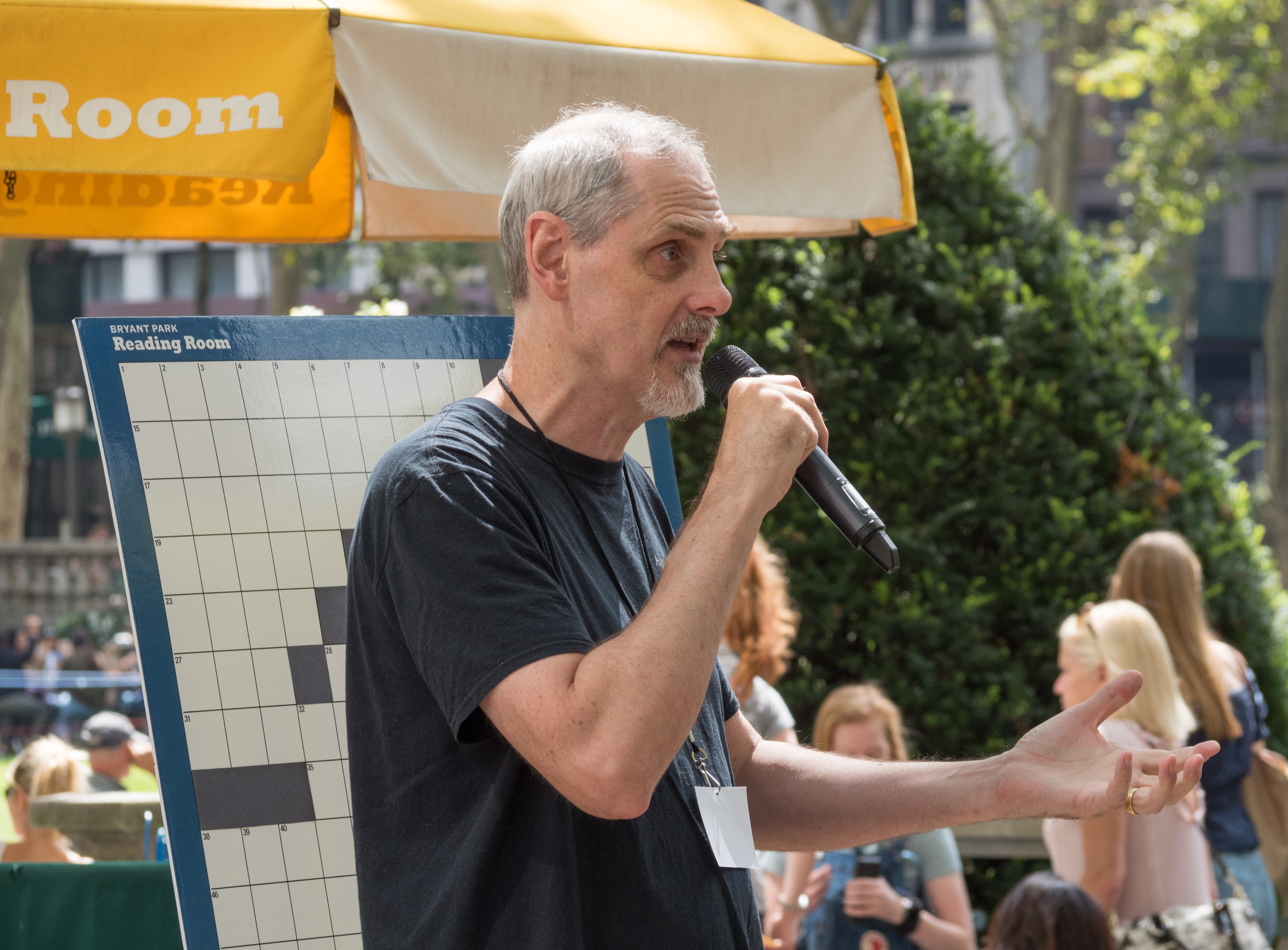
John Chaneski, an Ask Me Another "puzzle guru" in 2019

The show's games were created by a staff of puzzle designers. Until June 2018, a particular one of the show's puzzle designers, usually referred to as a "puzzle guru", typically appeared on the show as a third participant to direct the flow of activity on the show, make rulings or corrections, announce round winners, and host the final round. The first season of Ask Me Another featured two Puzzle Gurus per episode who typically alternated rounds, before being reduced to one in 2013. There were several of these over the length of the show, including:

- Art Chung (96 episodes, 2012-2018; the show's erstwhile puzzle editor)
- John Chaneski (35 episodes, 2012-2017)
- Greg Pliska (20 episodes, 2012-2018)
- Will Hines (11 episodes, 2012-2015 and 2017)
- Cecil Baldwin (6 episodes, 2015 and 2017-2018)
- Mary Tobler (5 episodes, 2013-2015)
- John Flansburgh (2 episodes, 2014-2015; described as the "Puzzle Giant", referencing his band They Might Be Giants)
- Noah Tarnow (2 episodes, 2012-2013)
- Will Shortz (July 2013, a special episode in Central Park; editor of The New York Times crossword puzzle)

Art Chung and John Chaneski were the primary Puzzle Gurus through 2015, with Chung taking on the role in all but 17 new episodes from 2016 through June 1st, 2018. Afterwards, no Puzzle Gurus appeared on the show, with Eisenberg and Coulton typically taking over all hosting and announcing duties. Cecil Baldwin previously appeared as a "Very Important Puzzler" for a February 2015 episode alongside castmates of the podcast Welcome To Night Vale, while John Flansburgh returned that June for an interview as part of They Might Be Giants. After the Puzzle Guru role was dropped, Baldwin appeared on the June 29th, 2015 episode strictly as a guest announcer.

=== Substitute in-house musicians ===
On shows where Jonathan Coulton was absent or ill, he was typically replaced by Julian Velard, who appeared in eighteen episodes from 2013-2019. Shonali Bhowmik was the first fill-in musician for two episodes in 2012, while Paul and Storm did the honors for two episodes in 2013. Coulton's friend and collaborator John Roderick filled in for a February 2013 episode, prior "Puzzle Giant" John Flansburgh was the house musician for an April 2015 episode, and 2017 NPR Tiny Desk Contest winners Tank and the Bangas performed in lieu of a house musician on a May 2017 episode. Velard and Cecil Baldwin both returned as remote interview guests for the penultimate episode of Ask Me Another in September 2021.

== Wrap announcement ==
On June 21, 2021, the show announced on social media that its final episode would be taped on September 25, 2021. Reruns aired on affiliate NPR stations until January 28, 2022.
