= Get Up and Dance =

2011 video game

- Developer(s): Gusto Games
- Publisher(s): O Games
- Platform(s): PlayStation 3, Nintendo Wii
- Release: November 4, 2011
- Genre(s): Rhythm game
- Mode(s): Single-player, multiplayer

Get Up And Dance is a 2011 music rhythm game developed by Gusto Games and published by O-Games. The game was released on November 4, 2011 for both the Wii and PlayStation 3. Players mimic an on-screen dancer's choreography for a selected song, using measurements from either the Wii Remote or the PlayStation Move controllers to judge player's abilities.

Prior to release, O Games settled with the video game publisher Ubisoft after Ubisoft filed for a temporary restraining order against the US release of Get Up and Dance, due to the title of the game's similarities to Ubisoft's Just Dance series. Reception to the game was mixed, with critics noting a distinct lack of content when compared to Just Dance games.

== Gameplay ==
After selecting a song, the player imitates dance poses made by a dancer on the screen. During gameplay, music videos play in the background of the scene behind the virtual dancer. Up to four players can play competitively at once. The game includes either 25 or 40 songs in the tracklist from a wide variety of genres, and does not contain any cover songs. A co-operative story mode allows players to dance together to work for a successful career.

== Development ==
Gusto Games and O Games announced Get Up and Dance in June 2011. In an interview transcript released by the publisher, O Games, the producer of the game noted that Gusto Games had never worked on a dance game before and that they used green screens to record dancers for the gameplay videos. Ubisoft unsuccessfully filed for a temporary restraining order against O Games to stop the game's United States release because of the similarities to the Just Dance series. United States district court Judge Charles Breyer ruled that "Ubisoft has not clearly demonstrated likelihood they are substantially similar." Ubisoft noted its intent to appeal the decision, but the game was able to be released in the US.

== Reception ==
The game received mixed reviews from critics, who felt it was released among a plethora of other music and rhythm titles that compared unfavorably towards competitors. The Guardian's Sarah Ditum said in a review of the Wii version that Get Up and Dance is an "unremarkable package" and noted the "inconsistency across a limited tracklist." Push Square's James Newton in a mixed review noted that the game "takes Just Dance as its template" and that "it sticks closer than most." Newton also noted the quantity of other PlayStation Move dance titles that were being released and felt that Get Up and Dance was not unique enough to be successful. Nintendo Gamer criticized the game's instructions, saying that the prompts for dance moves was unclear and compared it unfavorably to Just Dance.
