= John Katsilometes =

American journalist

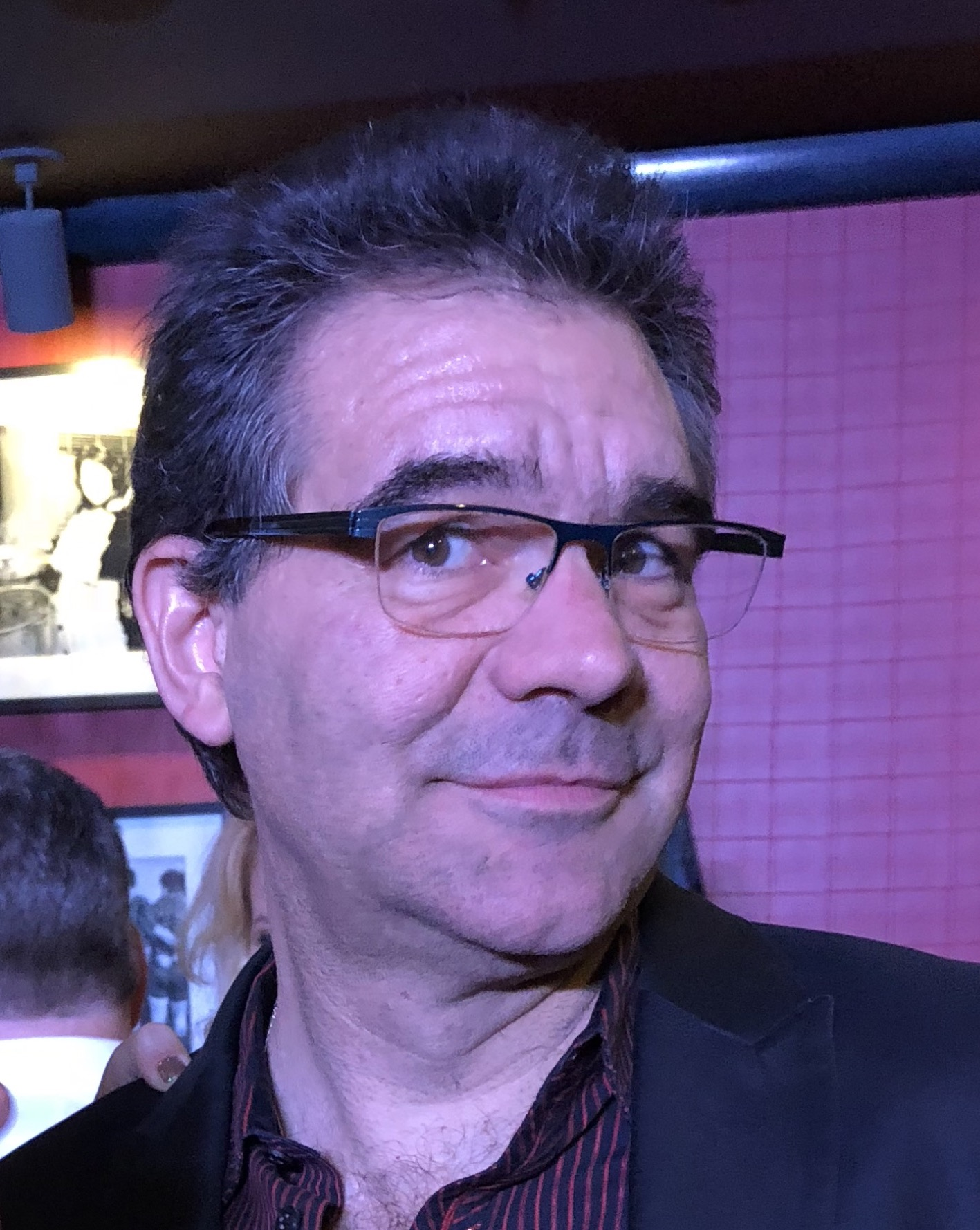
- Occupation: Journalist
- Employer: Las Vegas Review-Journal

John Katsilometes is an American entertainment columnist in Las Vegas, Nevada. He writes the "Kats!" column for the Las Vegas Review-Journal. Katsilometes was the Nevada Press Association's journalist of the year in 2013 and has also won four Best of the West awards, several Nevada Press Association honors, and an EPPY journalism award. He was inducted into the UNLV College of Fine Arts Hall of Fame in 2019 for his coverage of the Las Vegas entertainment scene.

== Background ==
Katsilometes worked as a sports writer at the Chico Enterprise-Record from 1984 to 1991, and at the Redding Record Searchlight from 1991 to 1996. He was initially hired as a sportswriter at the Review-Journal in 1996. In 1998, Katsilometes joined Greenspun Media Group, where he was a general feature writer, A&E editor, and writer-at-large for Las Vegas Weekly, Las Vegas Life, and Vegas. In February 2009, he began writing a man-about-town column, The Kats Report, for the Las Vegas Sun.

In 2016, Katsilometes returned to the Review-Journal in the place of longtime gossip columnist Norm Clarke. His column covering celebrities, city nightlife, and Las Vegas newsmakers runs daily on page 3A.

Katsilometes hosts the PodKats podcast on the Review-Journal's website.

Katsilometes was the first to announce the death of entertainment legend Jerry Lewis, and also the death of Lifestyles of the Rich and Famous host Robin Leach, who was a fellow columnist at the Review-Journal, on Twitter.
