= The Search for the Funniest Mom in America =

- Also known as: Funniest Mom
- Genre: Reality competition
- Presented by: Sandra Bernhard; Katey Sagal; Roseanne Barr
- Country of origin: United States
- Original language: English
- No. of seasons: 3
- No. of episodes: 13

Production
- Running time: 60 minutes
- Production company: Local Woman Films

Original release
- Network: Nick at Nite
- Release: May 3, 2005 – May 13, 2007

The Search for the Funniest Mom in America, or simply Funniest Mom, is an American reality competition television series that aired on Nick at Nite for three seasons, from 2005 to 2007. Each season had ten female comedians (all mothers) competing to be named the funniest. The winner got $50,000 and the chance to host a special night of programming on the network. For the first two seasons, the prize also included the opportunity to develop her own show for Nick at Nite; this was dropped for the third season. No television series starring any of the winners has made it to air.

The show first aired as a special on May 3, 2005, with stand-up comedian and actress Sandra Bernhard serving as host. Darlene Westgor was declared the winner. The second season aired for six episodes from April 4 to 24, 2006, hosted by actress Katey Sagal. The winner was Rubi Nicholas, a Muslim Pakistani-American mother of two. The third season, simply called Funniest Mom in America 3, ran for six episodes from April 10 to May 13, 2007. It was hosted by Roseanne Barr. The winner was Vicki Barbolak.
