= Norm Clarke =

American journalist (1942–2025)

- Clarke in 2011
- Born: July 8, 1942; Terry, Montana, U.S.
- Died: March 20, 2025 (aged 82); Las Vegas, Nevada, U.S.
- Occupation(s): Journalist, columnist, sports reporter
- Years active: 1963–2016; 2017–2025
- Employer(s): Las Vegas Review-Journal, Rocky Mountain News, Associated Press
- Known for: Columnist of "Vegas Confidential" in the Las Vegas Review-Journal
- Website: www.norm.vegas

Norm Clarke (July 8, 1942 – March 20, 2025) was an American sportswriter and reporter, later known for his gossip column in the Las Vegas Review-Journal, which ran from 1999 to 2016.

== Early life ==
Clarke was born on July 8, 1942, in Terry, Montana. He had two brothers and a sister. Their father died of cancer when Clarke was about 10 years old. When Clarke was a young child, one of his suspenders snapped loose and struck his right eye as he was playing. There were no effects until several years later when the eye became discolored; this, along with the family's history of cancer, prompted their doctor to encourage the eye's removal, which occurred around the age of 10. Clarke used a prosthetic eye into adulthood before adopting what would become his trademark eyepatch.

In 1955, Clarke was working as a paperboy for the Miles City Star newspaper. He graduated from Terry High School in 1960. Clarke subsequently attended Northern Montana College, but later dropped out, briefly bagging groceries thereafter.

== Career ==
Clarke began his writing career in 1963, as a sportswriter for the Terry Tribune, a weekly newspaper. He moved on to newspaper jobs in Miles City, Helena and Billings, Montana.

=== Associated Press and Rocky Mountain News ===
In 1973 he went to work for the Associated Press (AP) in Cincinnati, Ohio, where he covered the Beverly Hills Supper Club fire in neighboring Southgate, Kentucky, in which 165 people perished. In 2014, Clarke revisited the incident and wrote his account of interviewing the 18-year-old bus boy, Walter Bailey, who interrupted the comedians on stage to try to warn the nearly 1,300 people in the room about the fire. As authorities were controlling the scene in the immediate aftermath, Clark was the first to be able to interview Bailey. Clarke's reporting on the Willow Island Disaster, a 1978 collapse of a power plant in West Virginia, garnered him and his colleagues a nomination for the Pulitzer Prize. He also covered the 1980 MGM Grand fire in Las Vegas. He eventually transferred to San Diego, California and then Los Angeles, where he helped coordinate the AP's coverage of the 1984 Summer Olympics.

Clarke next went to Denver's Rocky Mountain News to work as a sportswriter, eventually covering the Major League Baseball team the Colorado Rockies. During the 1989 World Series held in San Francisco, Clarke was in the stadium as the 1989 Loma Prieta earthquake damaged the San Francisco Bay Area and the Stadium. In 1996, he switched to writing a lifestyle column for the paper.

=== Las Vegas Review-Journal ===
In 1999, Clarke wound up meeting the publisher of the Las Vegas Review-Journal while visiting one of his brothers, who worked as a photographer for the newspaper. The discussion led to Clarke joining the newspaper as its celebrity gossip columnist. His column, eventually known as "Vegas Confidential," launched on September 17, 1999. The column ran until July 28, 2016, when health challenges required additional medication, producing side effects which interfered with his work. Within a year, he had come out of retirement and joined the Vegas Stats & Information Network as a contributing columnist.

=== Bibliography ===
Clarke wrote five books. The most recent, a memoir called Power of the Patch, was published in March 2025, just before his death.

- Sinsational Celebrity Tales: Norm Clarke's Vegas Confidential. Stephens Press, 2009. ISBN 978-1-932173-77-2. OCLC 228370763. In the book, Clarke offers remembrances of celebrities who live in, or visit Las Vegas.
- 1,000 Naked Truths: Vegas Confidential: Norm Clarke! Sin City's Ace Insider. Stephens Press, 2004. ISBN 978-1-932173-26-0, 1932173269 OCLC 56545274. The book is a compilation of material from old columns, plus a great deal of new material. In the book, Clarke lists (among other things) the ten worst tippers in Las Vegas.
- High Hard Ones: Denver's Road to the Rockies from Inside the Newspaper War. Phoenix Press, 1993. ISBN 978-0-9636394-0-0, 0963639404 OCLC 28179710.
- Tracing Terry Trails: A Chronological History Compiled for Terry County Centennial Celebration. (Montana, [unknown publisher], 1982). OCLC 41687226.

=== Other media ===
From 2013 to 2019, Clarke hosted "Conversations with Norm", a stage series in which he interviewed numerous celebrities at the Smith Center for the Performing Arts.

He published the website Norm Clarke's Vegas Diary, which covered Las Vegas news, celebrity sightings, history, and human-interest stories.

== Personal life and death ==
Clarke was a resident of Las Vegas from 1999 and onward. On October 12, 2012, at the Smith Center, Clarke married Cara Roberts, whom he had met years earlier in Denver.

In 2001, Clarke was diagnosed with prostate cancer and continued to battle it for more than two decades. He ceased cancer treatment and entered hospice care on March 12, 2025, a week after injuring his hip at home. He died on March 20, 2025, at the age of 82.

Clarke hoped to be remembered as a reporter rather than a gossip columnist, noting his tenure with the AP. He was survived by his wife and siblings.
