= League of Legends All-Star =

International esports tournament

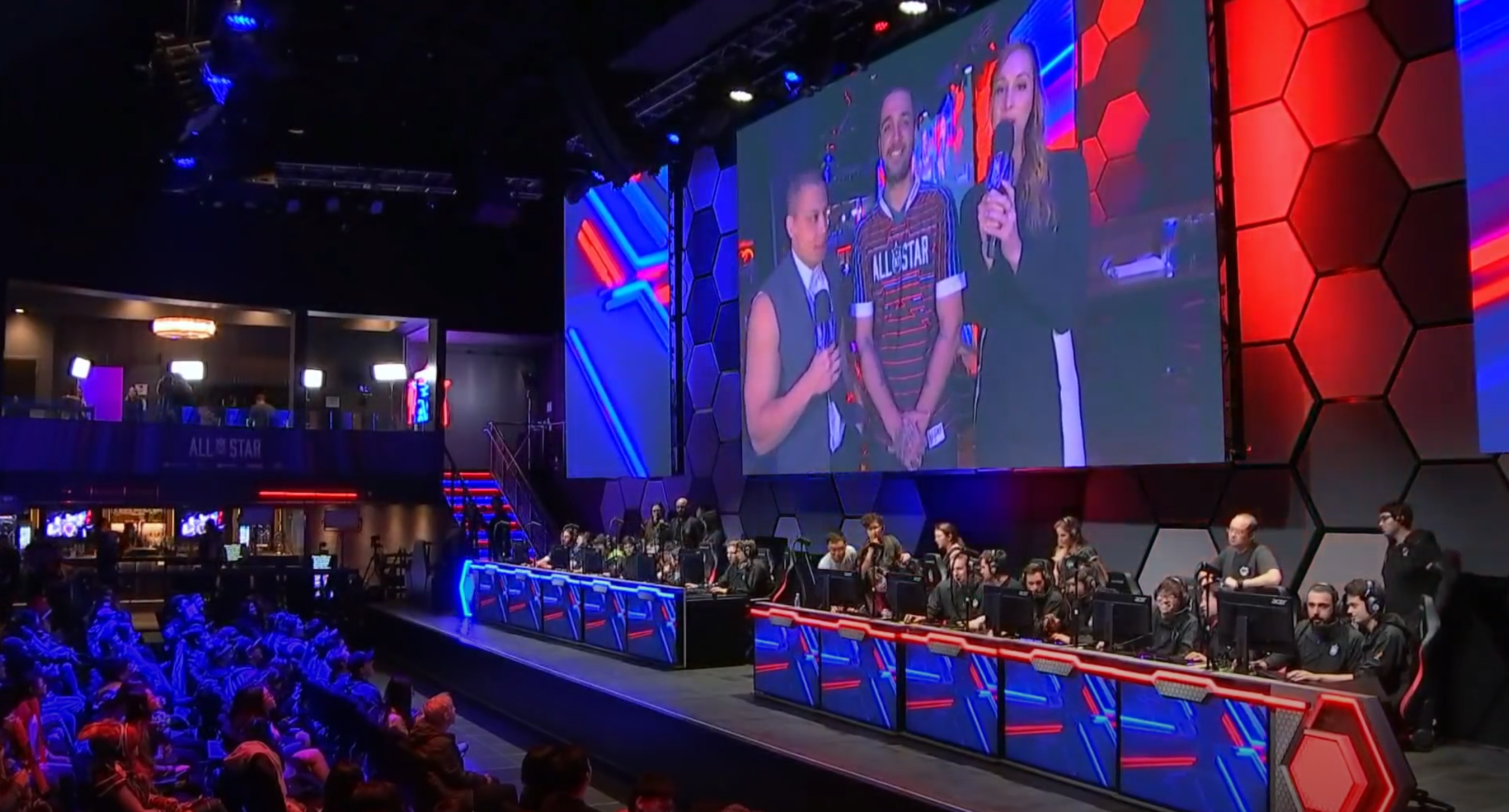
Stage at the 2018 League of Legends All-Star Event at the Esports Arena in Las Vegas, Nevada, US

The League of Legends All-Star event (ASE) was an international off-season League of Legends event featuring fan-voted players from each of the professional regions' top level leagues. The tournament was typically held in December after the World Championship, and featured professional League of Legends players competing in various unconventional game modes.

== Overview ==
| Year | Dates | City | Venue | Participating regions |
|---|---|---|---|---|
| 2013 | 24–26 May | (China) Shanghai | Shanghai Grand Stage | EU LCS; GPL; LPL; NA LCS; OGN |
| 2014 | 8–11 May | (France) Paris | Zénith Paris | EU LCS; GPL; LPL; NA LCS; OGN |
| 2015 | 10–13 December | (United States) Los Angeles | NA LCS Studio | EU LCS; IWC; LCK; LMS; LPL; NA LCS |
| 2016 | 8–11 December | (Spain) Barcelona | Palau Sant Jordi | EU LCS; IWC; LCK; LMS; LPL; NA LCS |
| 2017 | 7–10 December | (United States) Los Angeles | NA LCS Studio | CBLOL; EU LCS; LCK; LMS; LPL; NA LCS; TCL |
| 2018 | 6–8 December | (United States) Las Vegas | Esports Arena | CBLOL; CLS; EU LCS; LCK; LCL; LJL; LLN; LMS; LPL; LST; NA LCS; OPL; TCL; VCS |
| 2019 | 5–7 December | (United States) Las Vegas | Esports Arena | CBLOL; EU LCS; LCK; LCL; LJL; LLA; LPL; LST; NA LCS; OPL; TCL; PCS; VCS |
| 2020 | 18–20 December | Online | | CBLOL; LCK; LCL; LCS; LPL; LEC; LJL; LLA; OPL; TCL; PCS; VCS |
| 2021 | Cancelled due to the COVID-19 pandemic | | | |
