= Esports Arena =

American esports company

- Esports Arena logo
- Founders: Paul Ward, Tyler Endres
- Headquarters: Santa Ana, California
- Number of locations: 19 venues worldwide

Esports Arena is a chain of indoor arenas and event centers dedicated to esports. The buildings are specifically intended to host esports tournaments and events. The first location, Esports Arena Orange County, opened in Santa Ana, California, in 2015 and seats 1,400 people. In addition to hosting professional events, amateur events are also held at the arenas. Multiple Esports Arena venues have since been established worldwide, partially funded by the Chinese sports and video game company partnership Allied Esports.

== History ==
Former military intelligence officer Paul Ward started thinking about starting a major video game venue in 2010. He and his childhood friend Tyler Endres had fond memories of attending LAN parties and small-scale video game competitions while growing up, but were disappointed by the existing venues for such events as adults. Paul Ward and Tyler Endres, who are both 29, met in middle school playing basketball, and later attended nearby Azusa Pacific University together, but are gamers at heart. "Our kitchen in college was TVs and Xboxes," said Endres, and they ran impromptu tournaments whenever possible.

Esports Arena was founded by Ward and Endres as a location where amateur players can practice and mingle. The two initially had trouble finding a venue for their idea, though their pitch was positively received by Santa Ana building owner Jack Jakosky, who, despite not playing video games himself, saw potential in the idea. In order to afford a 10-year lease on the building, Ward and Erdes received a Small Business Administration loan, checks from friends and family, and an anonymous large investment.

The space they built — much of it by hand, laying carpet and running heavy-duty internet infrastructure themselves — is relatively spartan, with concrete floors and few fixed objects. "It needs to be modular," Ward said, because the arena is constantly hosting events of different sizes with different needs. Knowing the crucial difference between gaming and esports is at the heart of the concept. According to the Dutch research shop Newzoo, there will be 2.3 billion gamers worldwide by December 2017, but 191 million esports enthusiasts and 194 million occasional viewers.

The Esports Arena, the country's first venue opened specifically for esports competitions, opened in 2015. The building opened on October 3, 2015, to host a Hearthstone tournament with a $20,000 USD prize pool. The 15,000 square-feet venue is housed in an old renovated brick building in downtown Santa Ana and holds slightly under 1,000 people. Though major leagues are hosted in the Esports Arena, the building is primarily used as a "gym", offering memberships and passes to amateur gamers. Technology companies Corsair, Eizo and CyberPowerPC sponsored the gaming equipment, which included 130 computer stations and 64 Xbox consoles when the building was opened.

As it was opened, Ward and Endres planned to livestream daily amateur matches. Commentators and award ceremonies of such events would then create a certain atmosphere. In an interview with the Los Angeles Times, Endres stated that the "we're selling an experience, not Internet time."

By August 2016, Allied invested in Esports Arena and announced plans for the Oakland location to get started on the national expansion. Allied is now billing the planned Vegas location as the center of its worldwide network of esports.

== Locations ==
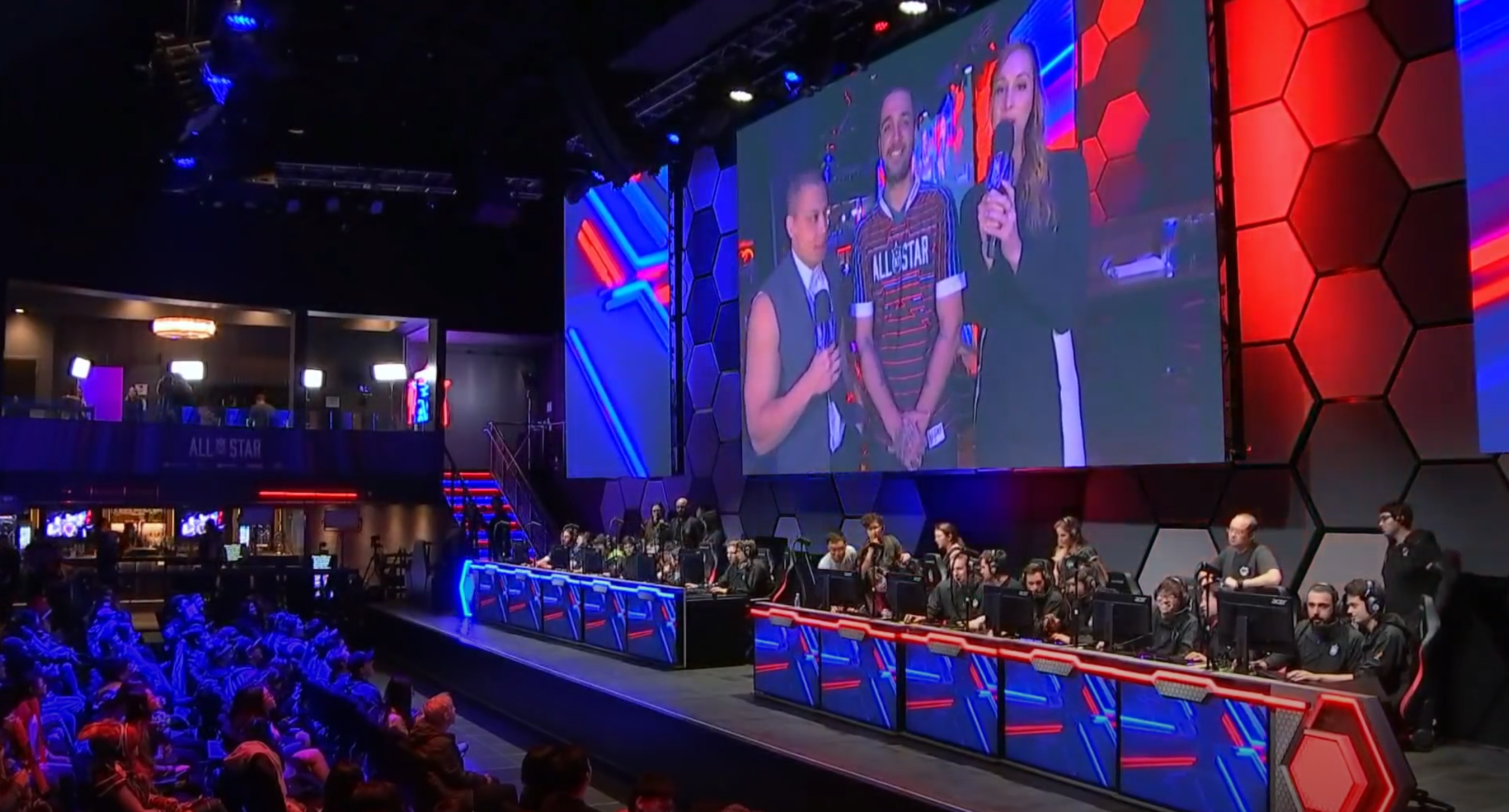
Esports Arena stage in Las Vegas, Nevada for the 2018 League of Legends All-Star event

In August 2016, Ward and Endres received a multimillion-dollar investment from five Chinese sports and video game companies – together known as Allied Esports – in order open a second Esports Arena on Jack London Square in Oakland. The deal marked the beginning of a network of arenas partially funded by Allied Esports. The 16,000 square-feet Oakland location opened in May 2018.

A 30,000 square-meter Esports Arena was established in the Luxor Hotel in Las Vegas in 2018, funded by Allied Esports and MGM Resorts International. Jud Hannigan of Allied Esports described Esports Arena Las Vegas as the esports equivalent of the Yankee Stadium, Madison Square Garden, or Wembley. Chris Glove, co-director of the Nevada Esports Alliance, stated that the Las Vegas location "will start to give some shape to the esports identity of Las Vegas." The naming rights were sold to gaming headset company HyperX, and HyperX Esports Arena Las Vegas opened on March 22, 2018.

== Events ==
Esports Arena Orange County has hosted various major tournaments, including the finals of the 2015 Vainglory (video game) season and SoCal Regionals 2016. The Esports Arena hosted the preliminary rounds of the 2016 Capcom Cup.

The Santa Ana facility has hosted live tournaments in titles such as Nintendo's Super Smash Bros. and Blizzard Entertainment's Heroes of the Storm. The arena is also open to casual gamers. Esports Arena also has locations in select Walmart stores, which host small-scale events and tournaments.
