= SoCal Regionals 2016 =

- 2016

Tournament information
- Sport: Street Fighter V, various others
- Location: Santa Ana, California
- Dates: October 14–16
- Tournament format: Double elimination
- Venue: Esports Arena

Final positions
- Champion: Zhuojun Zeng
- Runner-up: Tatsuya Haitani

SoCal Regionals 2016 (sometimes shortened as SCR 2016) was a fighting game event that took place in Santa Ana, California on October 14–16. Held by Level|Up, the event featured eight tournaments, among which one of the eleven Street Fighter V Premier Events of the 2016 Capcom Pro Tour.

The Street Fighter V tournament at SCR 2016 was won by Zhuojun "Xiao Hai" Zeng, who had already qualified to compete at the Capcom Cup earlier in the season.

== Background ==
SoCal Regionals was held in the eSports Arena in Santa Ana, California, moving away from the ballrooms and convention centers of previous years. The tournament was hosted by Level|Up, whose CEO Alex Valle stated that the company was "trying new things and stepping outside the norm." Eight different tournaments were held at SoCal Regionals: it was one of the last Street Fighter V Premier Events of the 2016 Capcom Pro Tour, the last tournament for the North American King of the Iron Fist Tournament for Tekken 7, and a qualifying tournament for the 2016 Killer Instinct World Cup. SCR 2016 featured the first Mortal Kombat XL tournament since the game had a major balance patch earlier that month.

The Street Fighter V tournament at SoCal Regionals 2016 had a prize pool of $350,000 USD. Steven Jurek of The Daily Dot said shortly before the event that "a strong performance this weekend could be the difference between being a part of the Capcom Cup field and being a part of the Capcom Cup audience." Due to four repeat winnings at Premier Events in the Capcom Pro Tour, the top 12 players in the global leaderboards (that have not already qualified) can compete in the 2016 Capcom Cup. Local talents such as Filipino Champ and Chris Tatarian were likely candidates to qualify for the Cup depending on their results at SCR.

A "live-bracketing" technology developed by Texas-based esports media group FloKO was utilized at SCR 2016 in order to streamline the online viewing experience.

== Participants ==
An online qualifying series was held on September 8–9, the champion of which won an all-paid expense ticket to attend SCR 2016. The Street Fighter V tournament held at SCR 2016 included 360 competitors, most of which from the United States, though some international "powerhouses" such as Yusuke Momochi and Gamerbee were also present. In an interview with ESPN, Alex Valle stated that Southern California has a powerful The King of Fighters community, and that the interest in Tekken had tripled compared to 2015.

== Tournament summary ==
The finals of the Street Fighter V tournament at SCR 2016 featured three competitors from the United States, two from Japan, one from China, and one from South Korea. Though American players NuckleDu, K-Brad, and PR Balrog played successful matches, none were able to reach the grand finals. Chinese player Zhuojun "Xiao Hai" Zeng won against Japanese player Tatsuya "Haitaini" Haitani in the grand finals, defeating him with the character Cammy despite Haitani's experience with the character. Haitani won the first match, forcing a bracket reset, but Xiao Hai turned the game around in the second match. After the tournament, Xiao Hai stated in an interview that "[Haitani] beat me a few times on my wakeup, but after I adjusted, he never got me again."

The Mortal Kombat XL tournament, meanwhile, was won by Brad "Scar" Vaughn, defeating his long-time rival Dominique "SonicFox" McLean in the grand finals to win US$10,000. Playing with Sonya Blade, who was severely weakened in the recent patch, Scar stated in an interview that his play felt "boosted" by the patch, stating that many other players were abusing the unbalanced content of the game before.

== Results ==
Place	Player	Alias	Character(s)
1st	(China) Zhuojun Zeng	Qanba|Xiao Hai	Cammy
2nd	(Japan) Tatsuya Haitani	YD.MJS|Haitani	Necalli
3rd	(United States) Kenneth Bradley	EG|K-Brad	Cammy
4th	(Japan) Kenryo Hayashi	Mago	Karin
5th	(United States) Du Dang	Liquid|NuckleDu	Guile, R. Mika
5th	(Japan) Shinya Ohnuki	CBZ|Onuki	Chun-Li
7th	(United States) Eduardo Pérez-Frangie	EG|PR Balrog	Balrog, Necalli
7th	(South Korea) Han-byeol Lee	/r/Kappa|Xyzzy	Birdie
9th	(Japan) Yusuke Momochi	EG|Momochi	Ken
9th	(United States) Justin Wong	EG|Justin Wong	Karin
9th	(United States) Kristopher Gomez	Addice|OliverQueen	Ryu
9th	(United States) Chris Tatarian	EVB|Chris Tatarian	Ken
13th	(Taiwan) Bruce Hsiang	ZW|GamerBee	Necalli
13th	(Japan) Ryo Nozaki	HM|Dogura	Necalli
13th	(United States) Vu Tra	GOL|Ranmasama	Rashid
13th	(United States) Peter Susini	Flash	Vega
