= Felix Rappaport =

American businessman

- Born: 7 November 1952; Philadelphia, Pennsylvania, U.S.
- Died: June 18, 2018 (aged 65); Mashantucket, Connecticut, U.S.
- Education: University of Pennsylvania
- Occupation: Businessman
- Spouse: Mary Louise Rappaport
- Children: Daughters: Alexandra and Briana

Felix D. Rappaport (November 7, 1952 – June 18, 2018) was an American businessman in the casino industry. He was a casino executive in Las Vegas, Nevada, for two decades.

From 2014 to 2018, he served as the chief executive officer of Foxwoods Resort Casino, "one of the world's largest gaming enterprises."

== Early life ==
Rappaport was born on November 7, 1952, and grew up in Philadelphia, Pennsylvania. He graduated from the University of Pennsylvania.

== Career ==
Rappaport began his career as executive director of the Burlington County chapter of the American Red Cross in Burlington, New Jersey. At the time, he was the youngest executive director in the United States.

He subsequently resigned that position to become human resource manager at the Brighton Hotel and Casino, which later became the Sands Hotel and Casino, in Atlantic City, New Jersey.

He then briefly worked for the Hershey Entertainment and Resorts Company as an assistant general manager and as a general manager.

In 1991, Rappaport became a casino executive in Las Vegas, Nevada, and initially worked for MGM Resorts.

Rappaport then served as president of the following Las Vegas resorts: New York New York, Luxor, Excalibur & The Mirage. He was one of the key figures who introduced many of Cirque du Soleil shows to Las Vegas and was the key to bringing Criss Angel to the Luxor Hotel & Casino.

Rappaport subsequently joined Foxwoods Resort Casino as senior vice president in Ledyard, Connecticut, and served as its chief from 2014 to 2018.

By the time of his death in 2018, Foxwood had become "one of the world's largest gaming enterprises."

== Personal life and death ==
Rappaport and his wife, Mary Louise, had two daughters.

Following his death in Mashantucket, Connecticut, on June 18, 2018, his funeral was held at the Cathedral of Saint Patrick in Norwich, Connecticut, on June 22, 2018.
