= Las Vegas Natural History Museum =

American nonprofit museum

Coordinates: 36.1799°N 115.1339°W

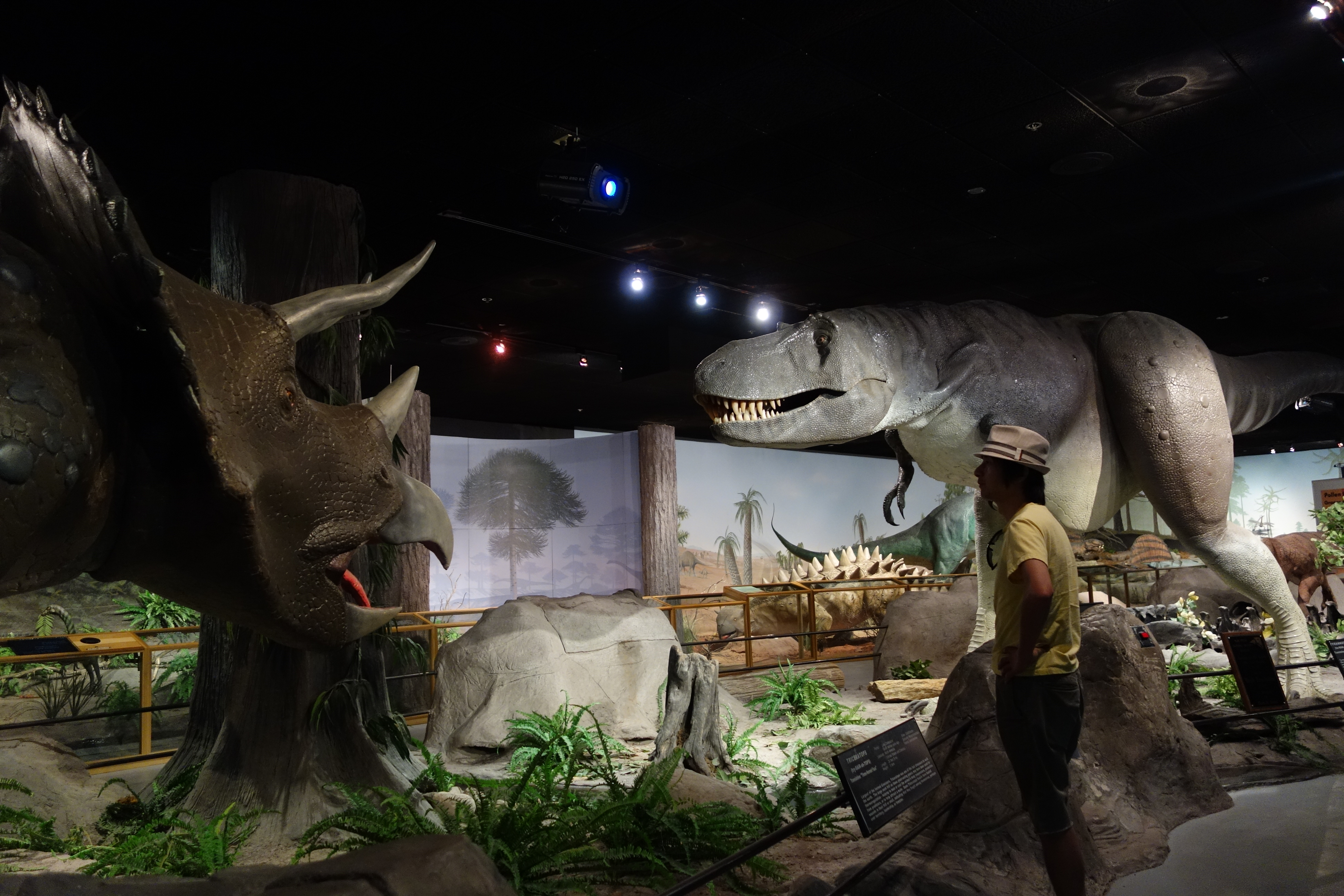
The dinosaur exhibit at the museum

The Las Vegas Natural History Museum is a private, nonprofit natural history museum that is located in Downtown Las Vegas, Nevada. The exhibits focus on various subjects, from dinosaurs, marine life, and mammals both exotic and native, as well as an Egyptian exhibit that opened in February 2010, focusing on the life of Tutankhamen.

The Museum opened on July 16, 1991, and is located on Las Vegas Boulevard across from the City of Las Vegas' Department of Human Resources, as part of the downtown area known as the Cultural Corridor. It is approximately one mile north of the Fremont Street Experience.

== Galleries ==
- Treasures of Egypt (The former "King Tut" exhibit donated by The Luxor Hotel and Casino)
- Las Vegas Founders' African Gallery
- Englestad Family Prehistoric Life Gallery
- International Wildlife Gallery
- Marine Life Gallery
- E. L. Weigand Foundation Wild Nevada Gallery
- Geology Gallery
- Young Scientist Center
