= List of tallest pyramids =

This article is a list of the tallest pyramids in the world, both ancient and modern. In order to qualify for inclusion, each entry must be referred to as a pyramid (not just "pyramidal", "pyramid-shaped" or "in the shape of a pyramid") by reliable sources and be at least 50 meters (160 ft) tall.

== Ancient pyramids ==
Name	Image	Original height	Construction date	Location	Notes
Pyramid of Khufu		146.6 m (481 ft)	2560 BC	Giza, Egypt	Also known as the Great Pyramid of Giza.
Pyramid of Khafre		143.5 m (471 ft)	2570 BC	Giza, Egypt	
Red Pyramid		105 m (344 ft)	c. 2600 BC	Dahshur, Egypt	
Bent Pyramid		104.7 m (344 ft)	c. 2600 BC	Dahshur, Egypt	
Pyramid of Meidum		91.7 m (301 ft)	c. 2600 BC	Lower Egypt	65 m tall after partial collapse; would have been 91.65 metres (300.7 ft).
Pyramid of Senusret III		78 m (256 ft)	c. 1850 BC	Dahshur, Egypt	
Pyramid of Amenemhat III		75 m (246 ft)	c. 1850 BC	Dahshur, Egypt	
Toniná pyramid		74 m (243 ft)		Chiapas, Mexico	Much of height includes hilltop.
Pyramid of Neferirkare		72.8 m (239 ft)	c. 400BC	Abusir, Egypt	
La Danta		72 m (236 ft)	c. 400BC	El Mirador, Guatemala	Height not independently verified. Includes platform. Pyramid footprint only 33m square.
Pyramid of Taharqa		67 m (220 ft)	c. 670 BC	Nuri, Sudan	Largest Nubian pyramid. 40 to 50 m high after partial collapse; originally stood at roughly 67 metres (220 ft).
Pyramid of Djedefre		67 m (220 ft)	c. 2500 BC	Abu Rawash, Egypt	
Great Pyramid of Cholula		66 m (217 ft)	9th century AD	Cholula, Mexico	Possibly the largest pyramid by volume known to exist in the world today.
Pyramid of the Sun		65.5 m (215 ft)	AD 200	Teotihuacan, Mexico	
Pyramid of Menkaure		65 m (213 ft)	c. 2510 BC	Giza, Egypt	
Pyramid of Djoser		62.5 m (205 ft)	c. 2667–2648 BC	Saqqara, Egypt	
Pyramid of Senusret I		61.3 m (201 ft)	c. 1900 BC	Lisht, Egypt	
Pyramid of Amenemhat III		58 m (190 ft)	c. 1850 BC BC	Hawara, Egypt	
Tikal Temple V		57 m (187 ft)	c. 700 AD	Tikal, Guatemala	Also known as Pyramid V; one of the tallest structures at Tikal.
El Tigre		55 m (180 ft)		El Mirador, Guatemala	
Calakmul Structure II		55 m (180 ft)		Calakmul, Mexico	
Pyramid of Amenemhat I		55 m (180 ft)	c. 1900 BC	Lisht, Egypt	
Pyramid of Djedkare		52.5 m (172 ft)	c. 2350 BC	Saqqara, Egypt	
Pyramid of Teti		52.5 m (172 ft)	c. 2300 BC	Saqqara, Egypt	
Pyramid of Pepi I		52.5 m (172 ft)	c. 2250 BC	Saqqara, Egypt	
Pyramid of Merenre		52.5 m (172 ft)	c. 2200 BC	Saqqara, Egypt	
Pyramid of Pepi II		52.5 m (172 ft)	c. 2200 BC	Saqqara, Egypt	
Pyramid of Nyuserre		51.7 m (170 ft)	c. 2400 BC	Abusir, Egypt	
Calakmul Structure I		50 m (160 ft)		Calakmul, Mexico	

== Modern pyramidal buildings ==
Name	image	Height	Year	Location	Notes
Luxor Pyramid		107 m (351 ft)	1993	Paradise, Nevada, US	
Memphis Pyramid		98 m (322 ft)	1991	Memphis, Tennessee, US	
Palace of Peace and Reconciliation		62 m (203 ft)	2006	Astana, Kazakhstan	
Walter Pyramid		58 m (190 ft)	1994	Long Beach, California, US	
