= Luxor Las Vegas =

Hotel and casino in Paradise, Nevada

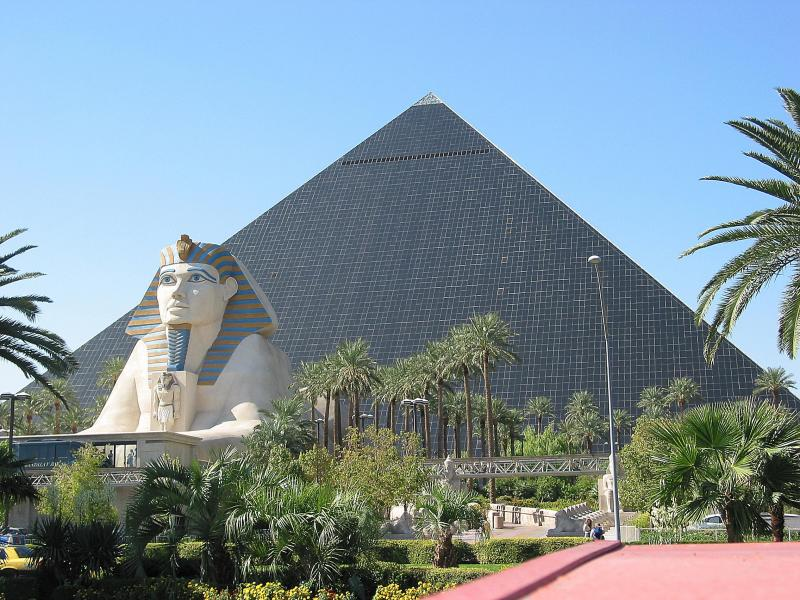

- Location within Las Vegas Strip Location within Nevada
- Interactive map of Luxor Las Vegas
- Location: Paradise, Nevada, U.S.; 3900 South Las Vegas Boulevard; 36°05′44″N 115°10′33″W
- Opened: October 15, 1993; 33 years ago
- Theme: Ancient Egypt
- No. of rooms: 4,407
- Gaming space: 65,214 sq ft (6,058.6 m^{2})
- Permanent shows: America's Got Talent Presents Superstars Live; Blue Man Group; Fantasy; Carrot Top
- Signature attractions: Discovering King Tut's Tomb; Titanic: The Artifact Exhibition; Bodies: The Exhibition
- Notable restaurants: Backstage Deli; Bonanno's Pizzeria; Johnny Rockets; Nathan's Famous Hotdogs; Starbucks; The Buffet at Luxor
- Casino type: Land-based
- Owner: Vici Properties
- Operating license holder: MGM Resorts International
- Renovated in: 1996–97, 2007–08, 2021
- Website: luxor.com

Luxor Las Vegas is a casino hotel on the southern end of the Las Vegas Strip in Paradise, Nevada. Luxor features an ancient Egyptian theme, and includes a casino and over 4,000 hotel rooms. The resort's pyramid is 30 stories and contains the world's largest atrium by volume. The tip of the pyramid features a light beam, which shines into the night sky and is the most powerful human-made light in the world.

The property is owned by Vici Properties and operated under lease by MGM Resorts International, which had spun-off MGM Growth Properties in 2015, to divest its real estate holdings, before it was acquired by Vici in 2022. Luxor was first developed by Circus Circus Enterprises at a cost of $375 million. Construction began on April 21, 1992, and the resort opened on October 15, 1993, with 2,526 rooms. A renovation and expansion project, costing $300 million, took place from 1996 to 1997. The project included the addition of two 22-story hotel towers, as well as Nevada's first 3D IMAX theater. The Egyptian theme was scaled back as well, including the removal of an indoor Nile River ride.

MGM acquired Luxor in 2005. The company launched a $300 million renovation two years later, further scaling back on the Egyptian theme while adding new restaurants and clubs. An esports arena was added in 2018, the first to open on the Strip. Luxor has hosted various entertainers, including comedian Carrot Top, the Blue Man Group, and magician Criss Angel.

== History ==
=== Construction and opening ===
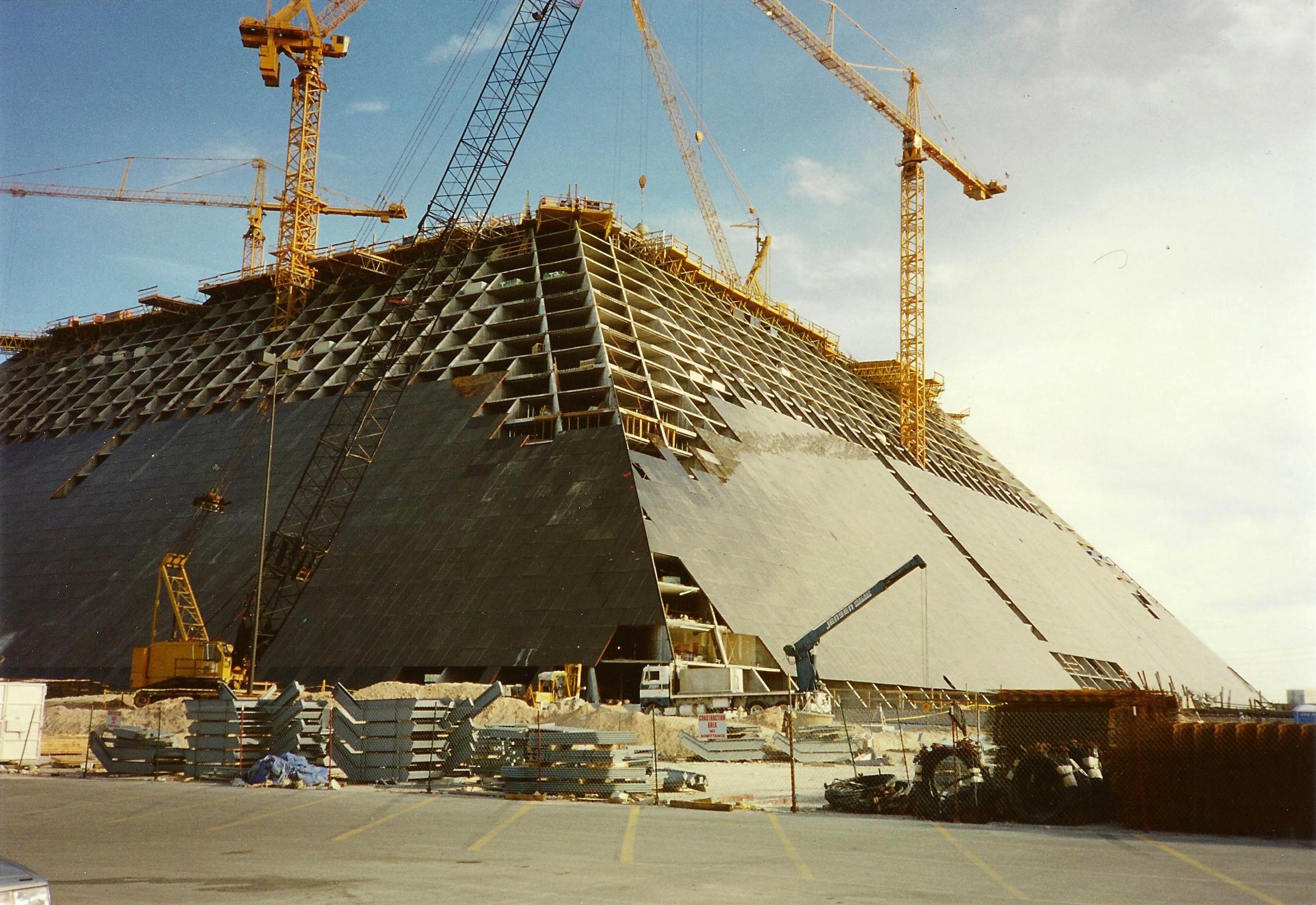
Luxor during construction, April 1993

The resort was announced by Circus Circus Enterprises on November 14, 1991. Known temporarily as "Project X", the pyramid-shaped resort would be built on the Las Vegas Strip. Groundbreaking took place on April 21, 1992, with the project by then known as "Luxor", after the Egyptian city of the same name.

Veldon Simpson was the architect, while Yates-Silverman, Inc served as interior designer. President and owner Charles L. Silverman traveled to Egypt three times to study the country's atmosphere. Of all the casino resorts that his firm had designed, Silverman called Luxor "the most interesting and difficult". Before the ancient Egyptian theme was chosen, Yates-Silverman had suggested developing the land with a moat and a real riverboat casino to traverse it. Egyptologists were hired to create and oversee Luxor's theme, which was prevalent throughout the resort. The interior included replicas of various Egyptian artifacts, made of fiberglass and plaster.

Perini Building Company served as general contractor. The project employed more than 150 contractors and 3,500 construction workers, several of whom died while building the resort, leading in turn to rumours that the building is cursed or haunted. Waltek, a Cincinnati-based company, provided the metal-and-glass exterior for the pyramid. Standing 30 stories high, it was one of the largest metal-and-glass projects ever. The pyramid was topped off on July 9, 1993.

Luxor cost $375 million to build. The resort was financed using internal cash flow from other Circus Circus properties and did not include any outside financial investors. Circus Circus chairman William Bennett said the most challenging aspect of construction was dealing with Clark County officials, who he felt were overly critical of the resort due to its pyramid shape. He claimed county regulations, including improved fire precautions, added unnecessary costs to construction.

Luxor hosted a pre-opening event for hundreds of invited guests on the night of October 14, 1993. It opened to the public the following day at 4 a.m., welcoming thousands of people. It would compete against two other upcoming resorts, MGM Grand and Treasure Island. All three resorts had a family-oriented focus. Luxor employed 4,500 workers.

Tupac Shakur, who was fatally shot in Las Vegas in 1996, had been staying at Luxor during his visit to the city, although his injuries sustained from the drive-by shooting occurred four miles from the resort.

=== Renovations and ownership changes ===
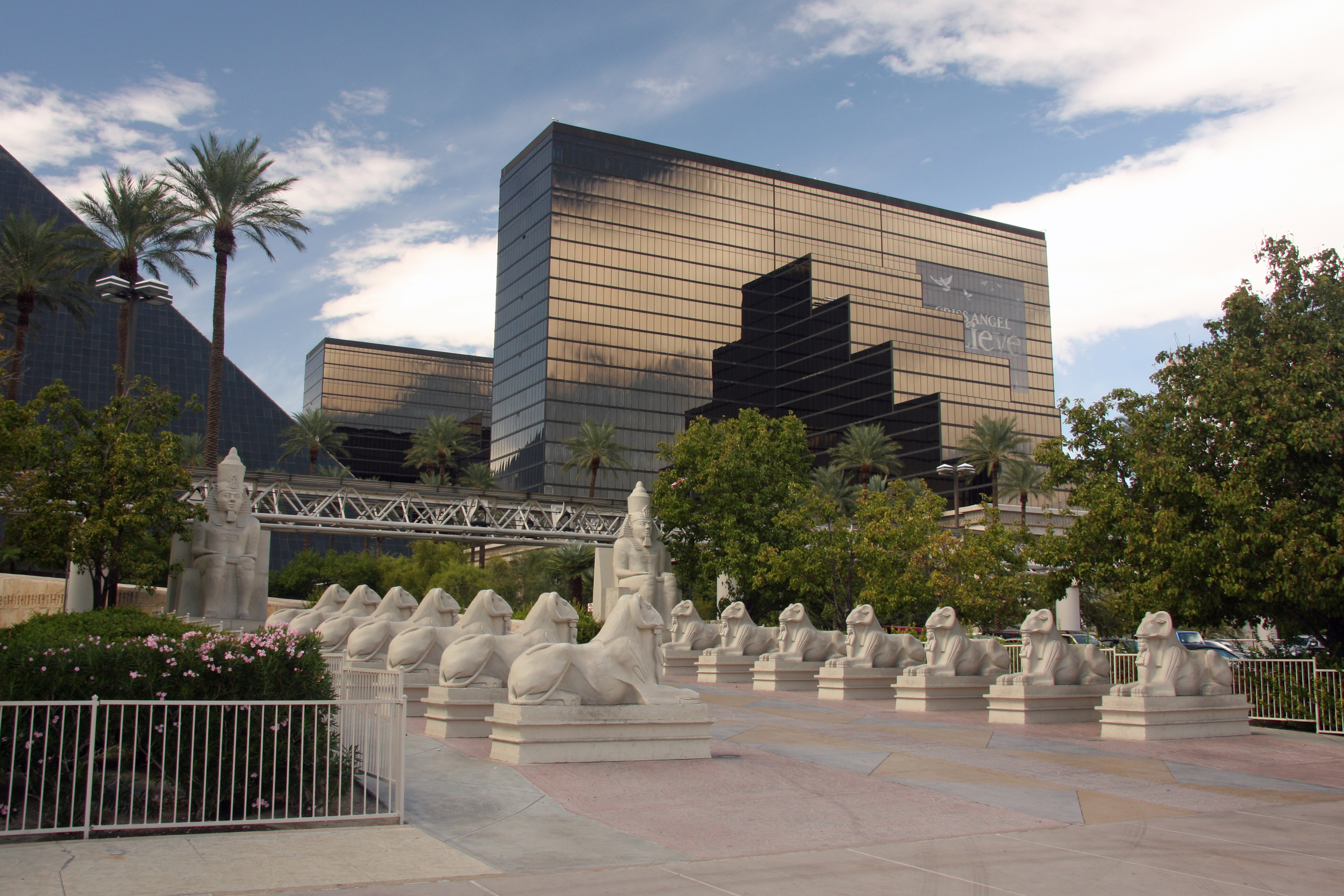
The additional hotel towers added in 1996

Within a few years of the Luxor's opening, resort executives concluded that it needed to be improved and enlarged. A $300 million renovation and expansion was launched in January 1996, and was mostly finished a year later. The changes included two additional hotel towers. The casino interior, which was redesigned, had initially included sections dedicated to space travel and the skyline of New York City, both of which were removed. The Egyptian theme was also scaled back. The changes improved revenue, and Luxor was a consistently profitable resort as of 2003. It was reported four years later that more people visited the resort than the actual city of Luxor.

Circus Circus Enterprises was renamed Mandalay Resort Group in 1999, and was acquired by MGM Mirage (later MGM Resorts International) in 2005. Two years after the acquisition, MGM announced plans for a $300 million renovation of Luxor that would remove much of the Egyptian theme. Luxor president and chief operating officer Felix Rappaport said, "We're not a British museum with ancient artifacts, we're a casino-resort. This was a brilliantly conceived building from the outside. The pyramid always created a sense of wow and wonder, but the inside never delivered on that promise." He further said: "We are trying to be approachable. We want to be a cooler and hipper middle-market property. We want to be less themed but still a middle-market property." Despite the interior changes, the exterior Egypt theme remained in place. The resort added more adult-oriented and modern lounges, restaurants and clubs.

=== 2007 bombing ===
On May 7, 2007, a homemade pipe bomb exploded in a vehicle in the Luxor parking garage, killing one man in his 20s. The victim, an employee at Nathan's Famous hot dog restaurant in the Luxor food court, was the intended target. The resort was not evacuated, operations continued uninterrupted, and the parking structure as well as the casino were undamaged.

Two men were found guilty of the bombing, with the motive being the victim's relationship with an ex-girlfriend of one of the perpetrators. In 2010, each was sentenced to life imprisonment without the possibility of parole.

== Property overview ==
Comparison of approximate profiles of the Luxor Las Vegas with some notable pyramidal or near-pyramidal buildings. Dotted lines indicate original heights, where data is available. In its SVG file, hover over a pyramid to highlight and click for its article.

Luxor is at the southern end of the Strip, and is located between two other resorts developed by Circus Circus Enterprises: Excalibur to the north (opened in 1990) and Mandalay Bay to the south (opened in 1999). The Mandalay Bay Tram travels between the three properties.

Luxor's pyramid is 30 stories, standing 357 ft (109 m). Its exterior sides are sometimes used for advertising. The pyramid includes the largest atrium in the world by volume, measuring 29 million ft^{3} (0.82 million m^{3}). The resort's exterior features a recreation of the Great Sphinx of Giza, located in front of the pyramid and facing the Strip. The recreation is 106 feet high, 80 feet wide, and 262 feet long (32 m × 24 m × 80 m). Within the body of the sphinx is the resort's porte-cochère. An obelisk stands in front of the sphinx.

The hotel includes 4,407 rooms. It originally opened with 2,526 rooms, all of them located in the pyramid. The rooms line the pyramid's interior walls, and walkways outside the rooms overlook the atrium. The interior of the pyramid uses inclined elevators, traveling at a 39-degree angle, to bring guests to their rooms. The structure features eight elevators, with two at each corner of the pyramid. The two additional hotel towers added in 1996 are located just north of the pyramid. The ziggurat-shaped towers, designed by Klai Juba Architects, are 22 stories and added nearly 2,000 additional rooms. The exterior of the hotel structures, including the pyramid, is made up of black glass panels.

Luxor includes a 65,214 sq ft (6,058.6 m^{2}) casino. Upon opening, it featured 2,500 slot machines, many of them Egyptian-themed. The casino also included 82 table games, a poker room, and race and sports books. A high-end gaming pit was added in the 1996–97 renovation. Giza Galleria, a small retail mall with 18 tenants, was also opened. In addition, the Mandalay Place mall is located on a skybridge that connects Mandalay Bay with Luxor.

Gallery of various areas
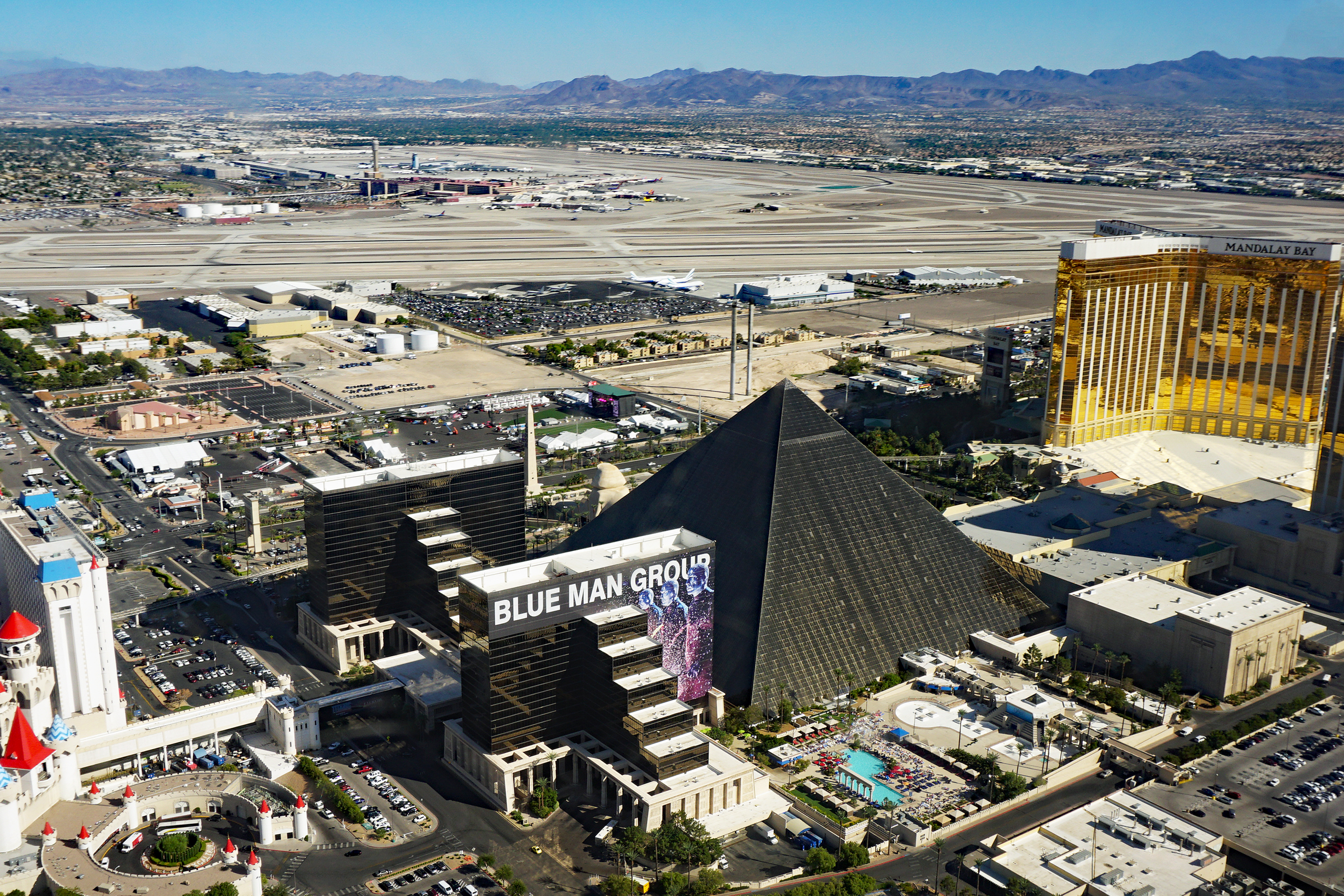
Aerial view of the pyramid and its adjacent towers

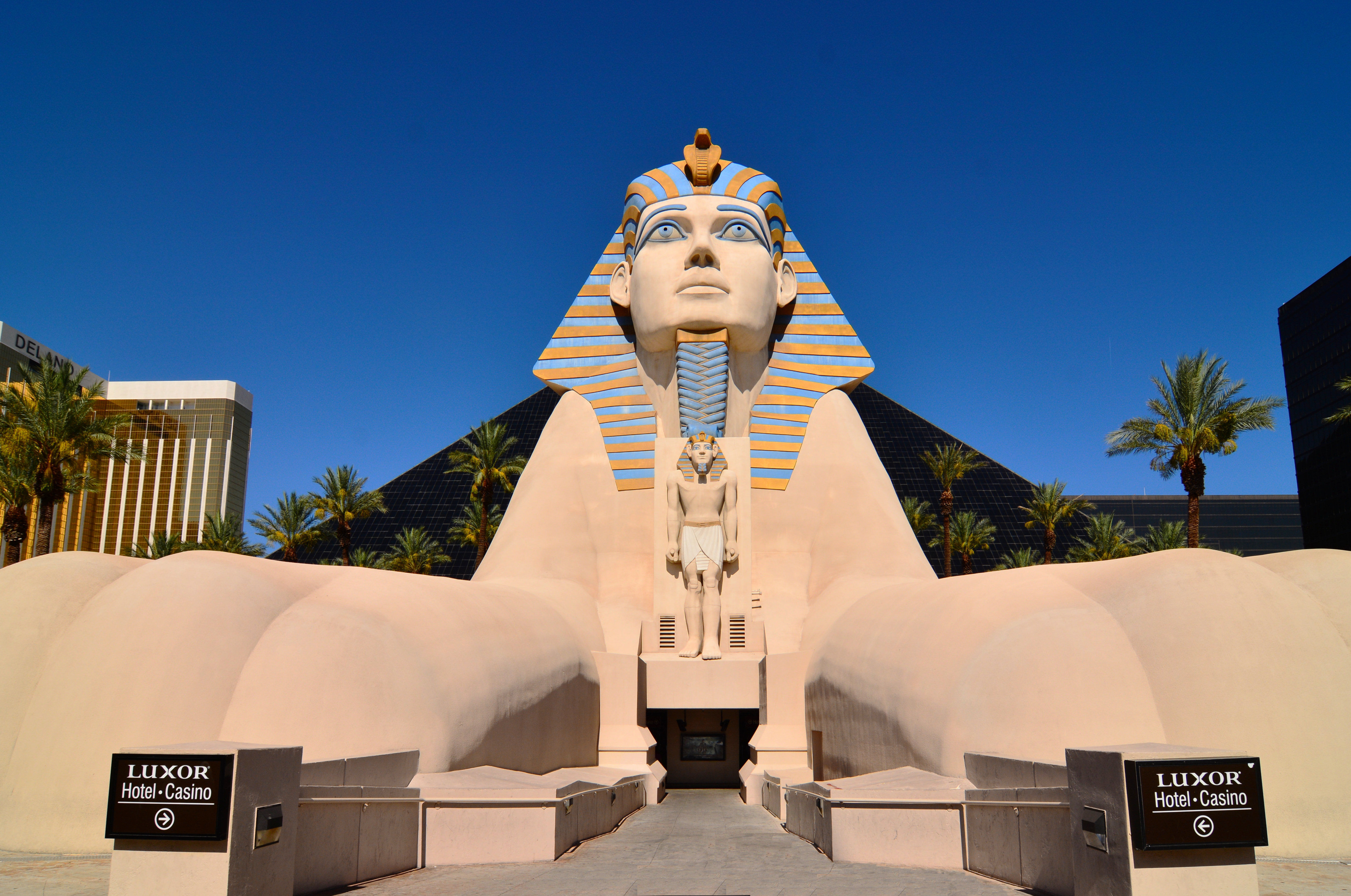
The sphinx entrance along the Strip

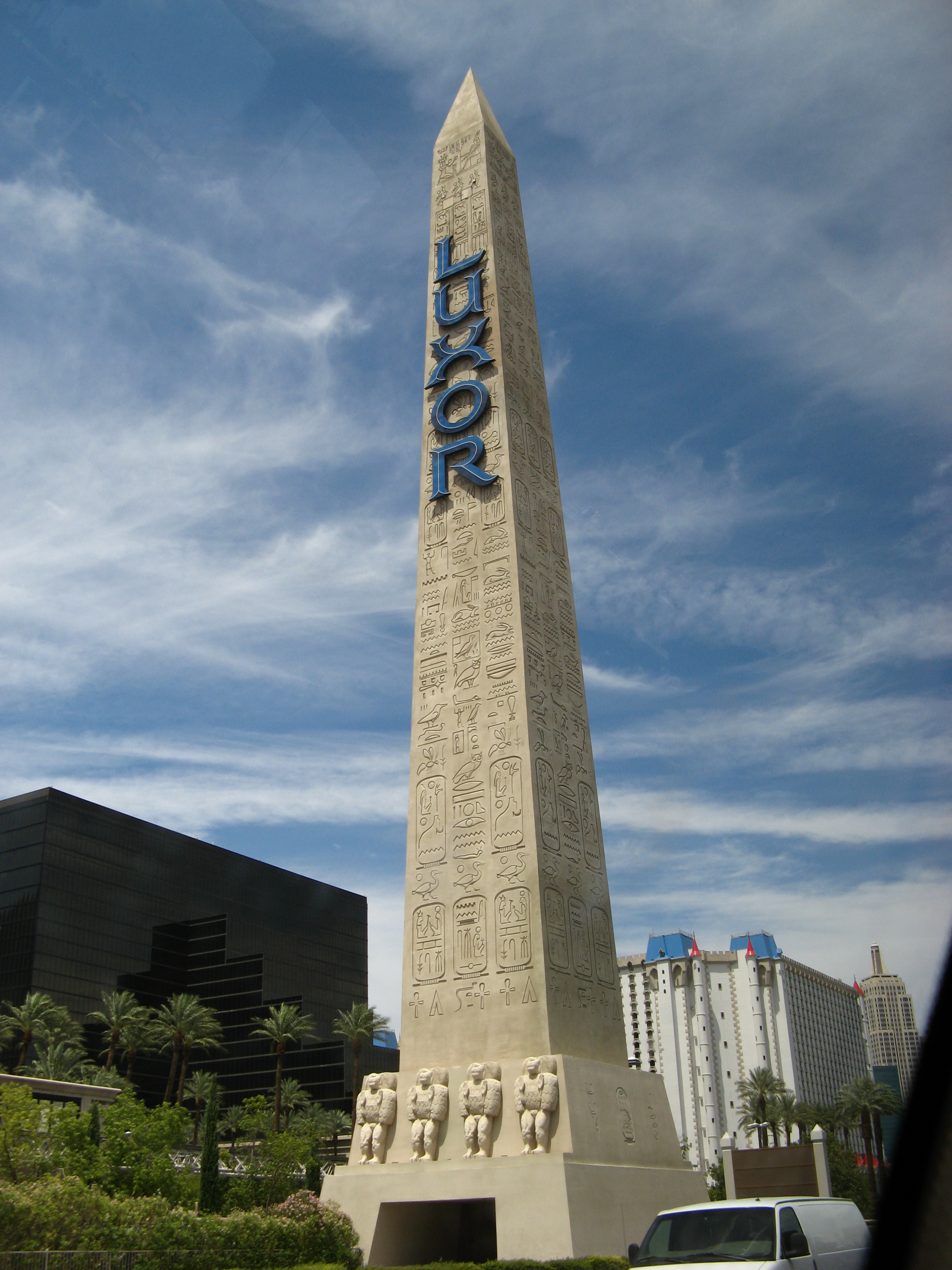
The Luxor's exterior obelisk

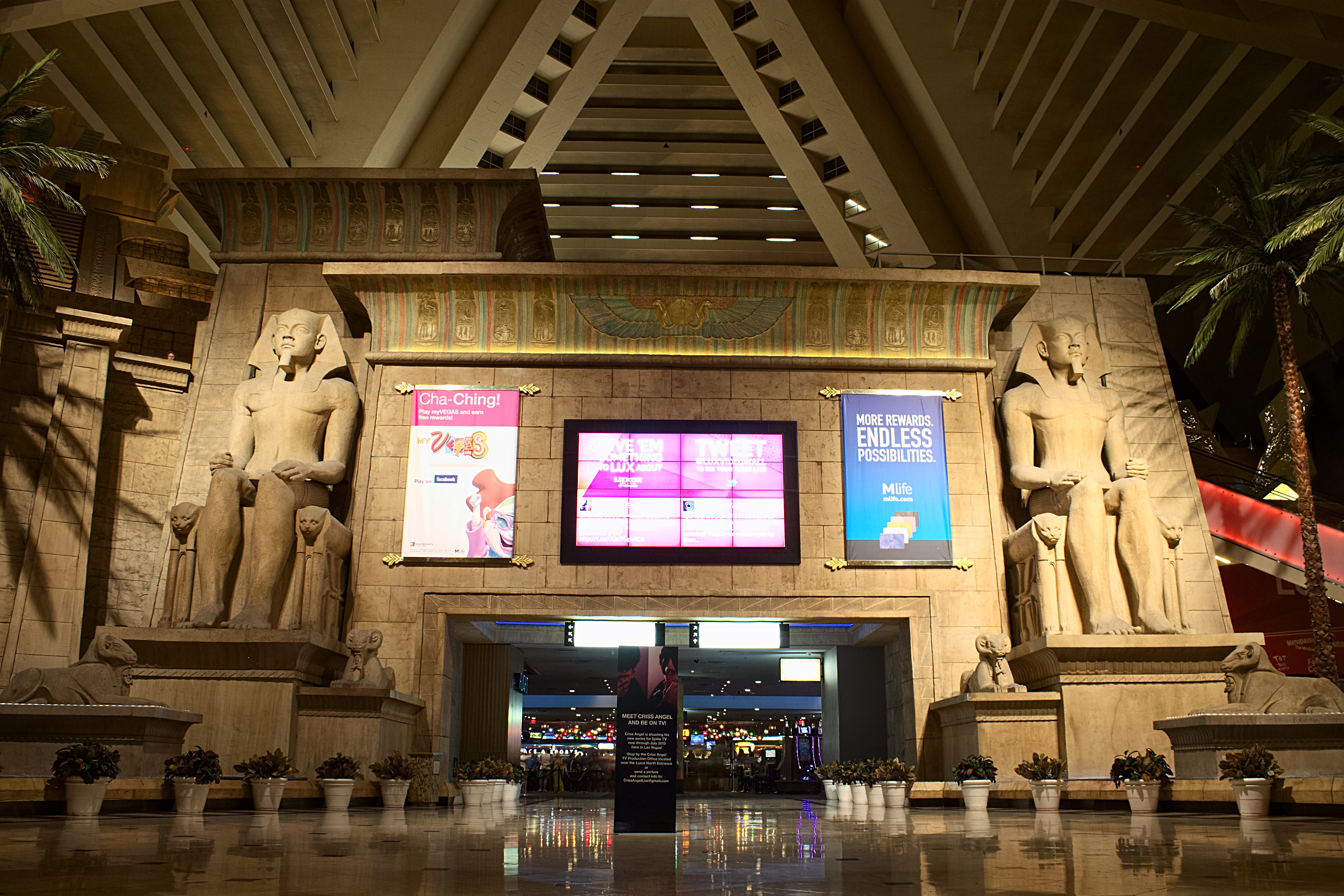
Egyptian architecture inside the pyramid

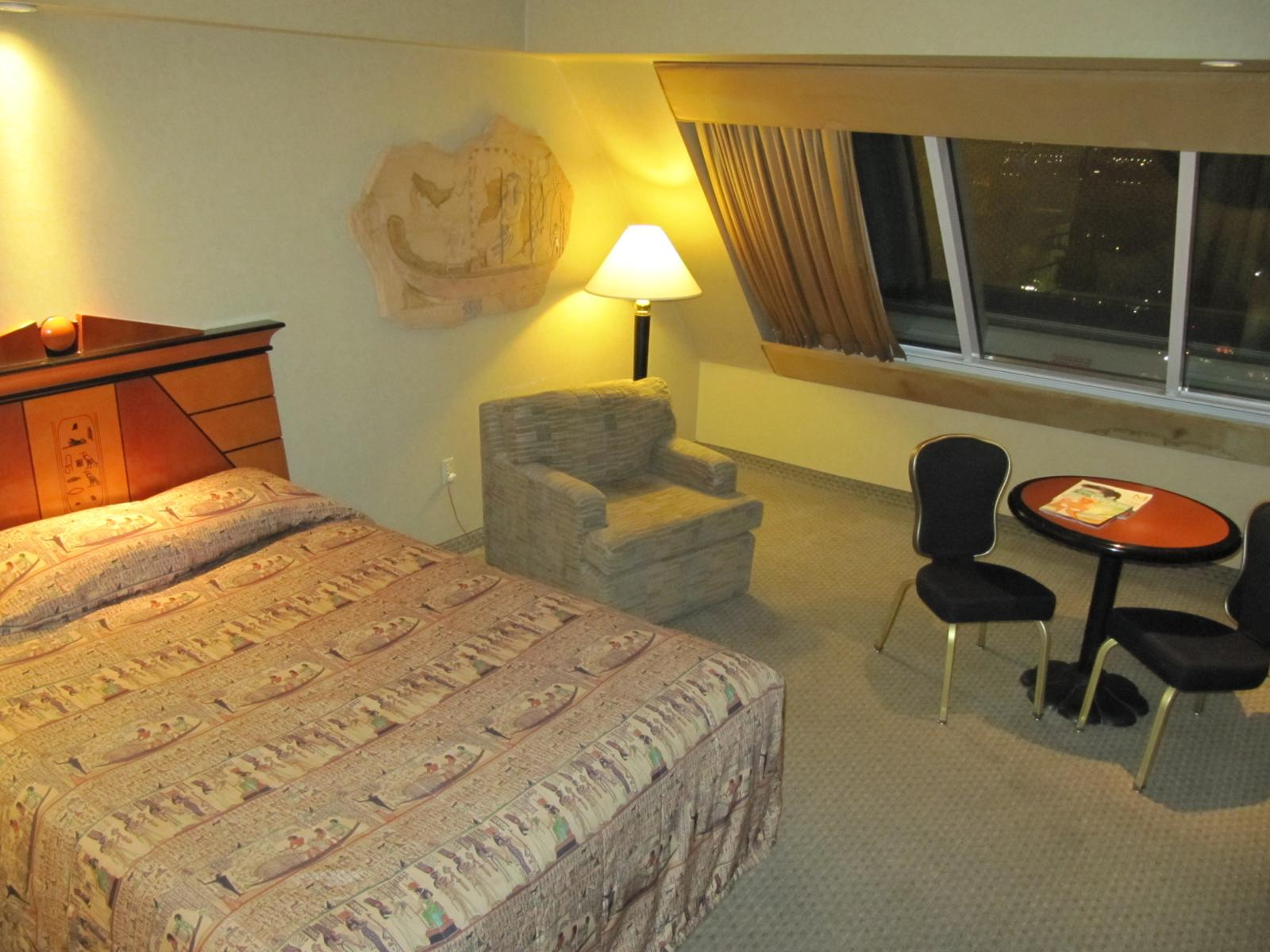
A hotel room in the pyramid

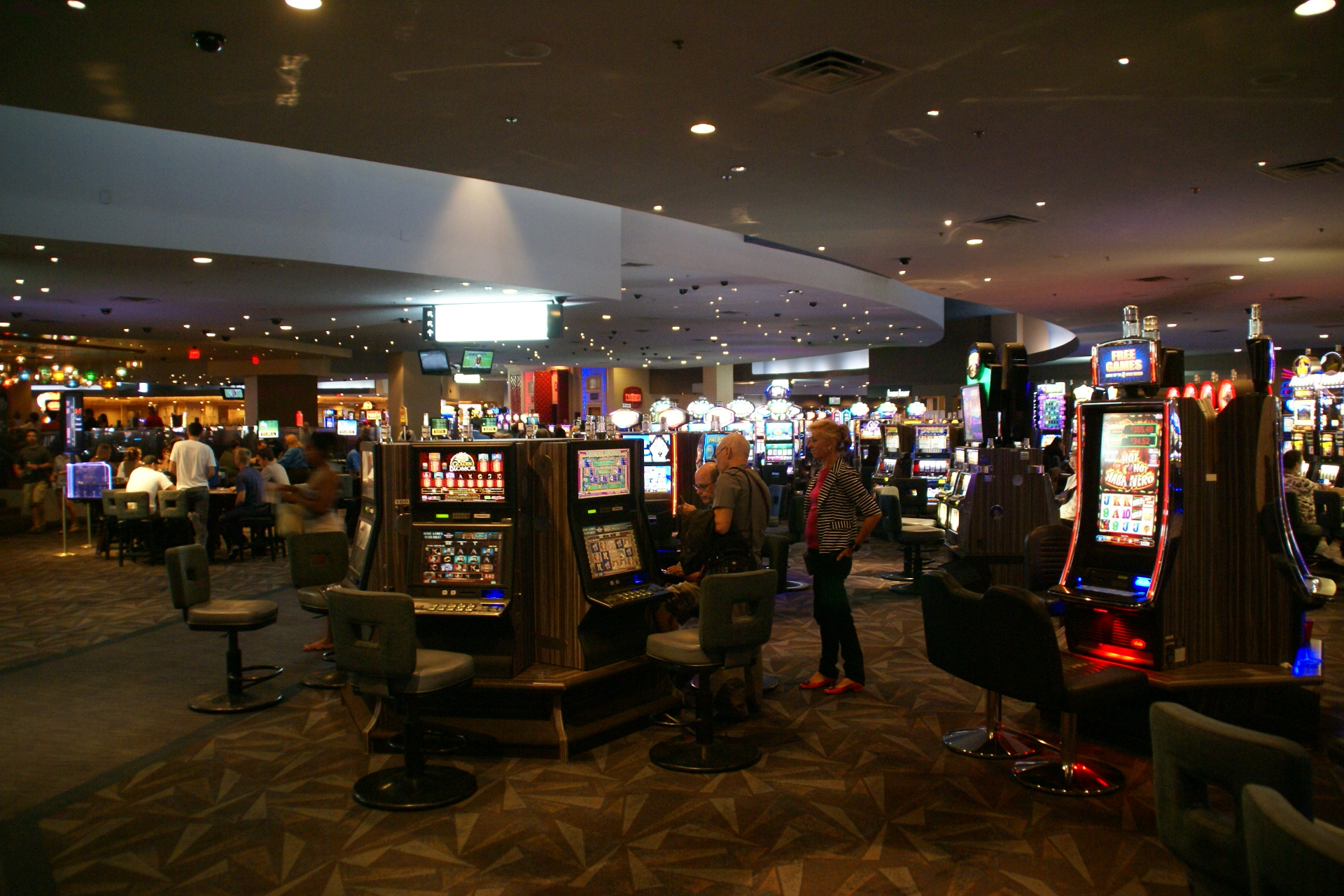
The Luxor's casino floor
Gallery of the atrium
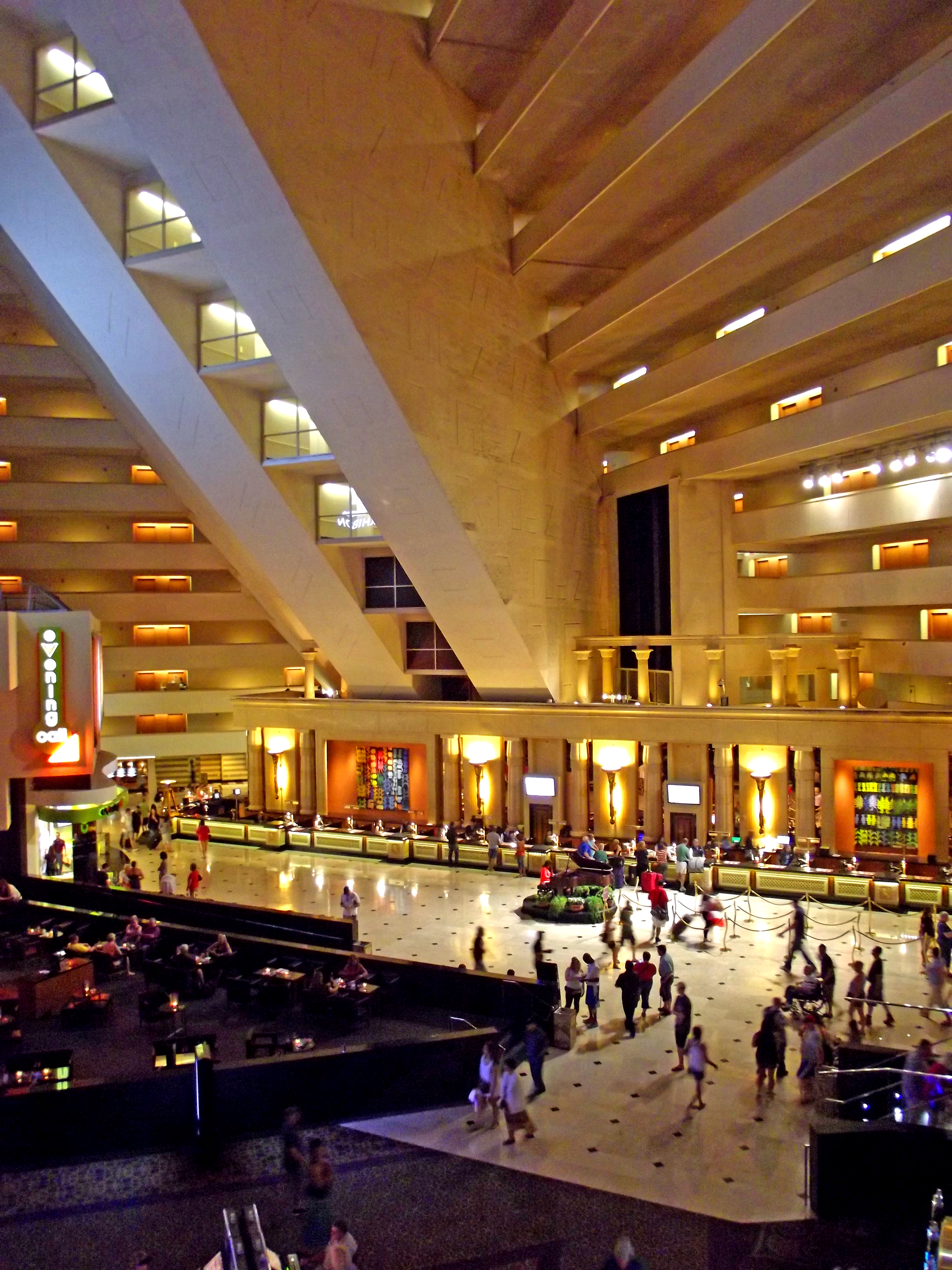

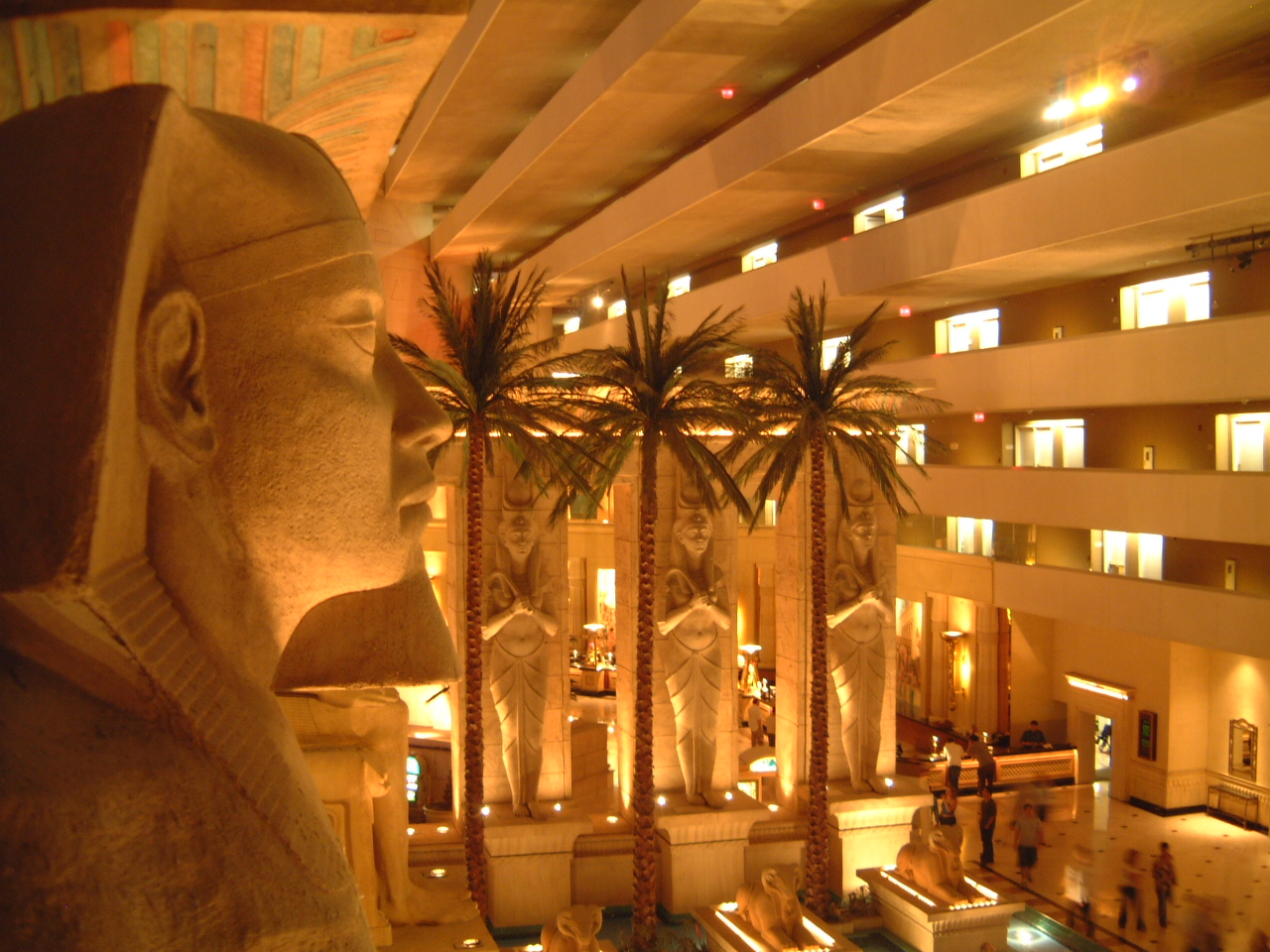

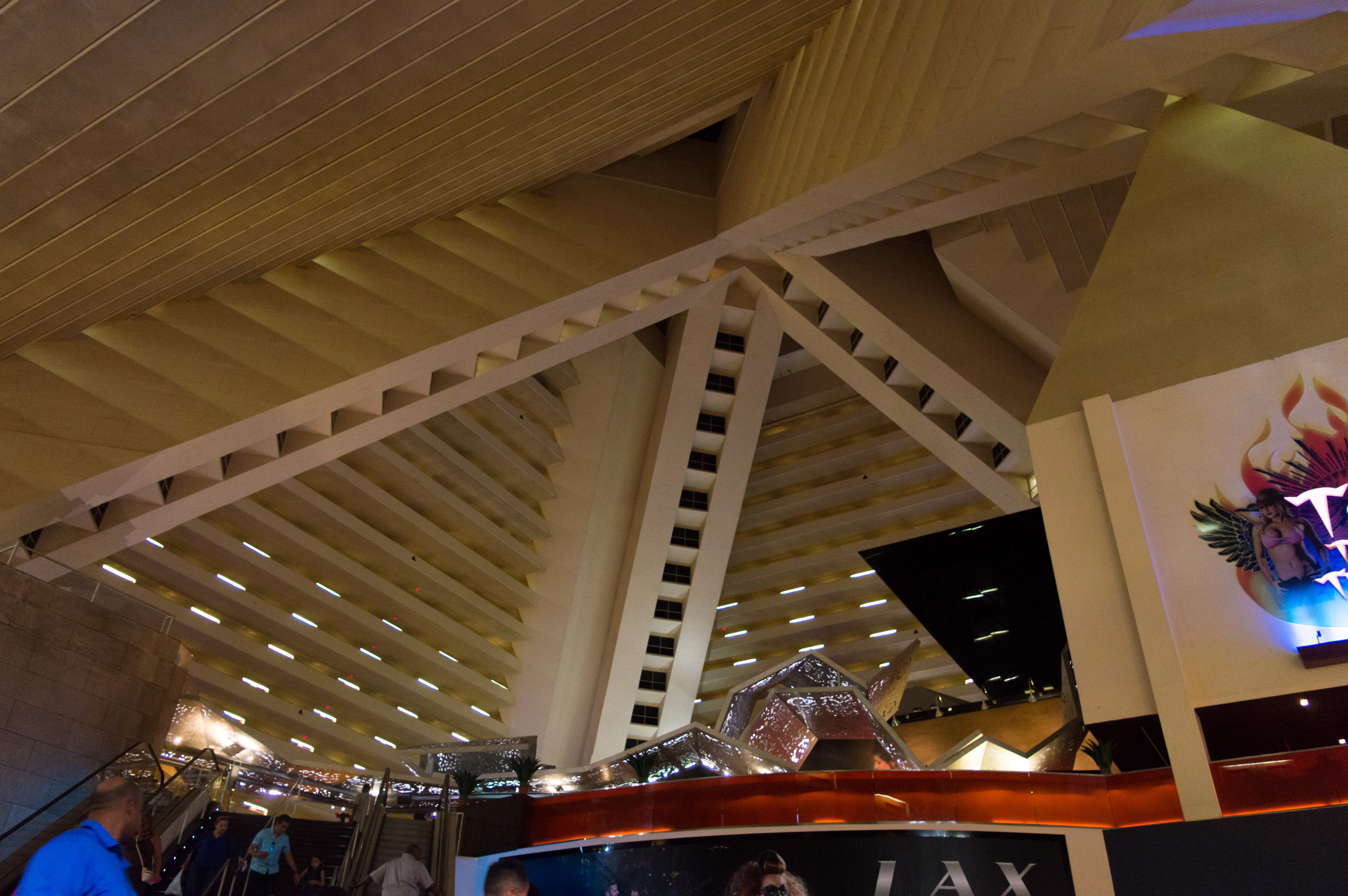

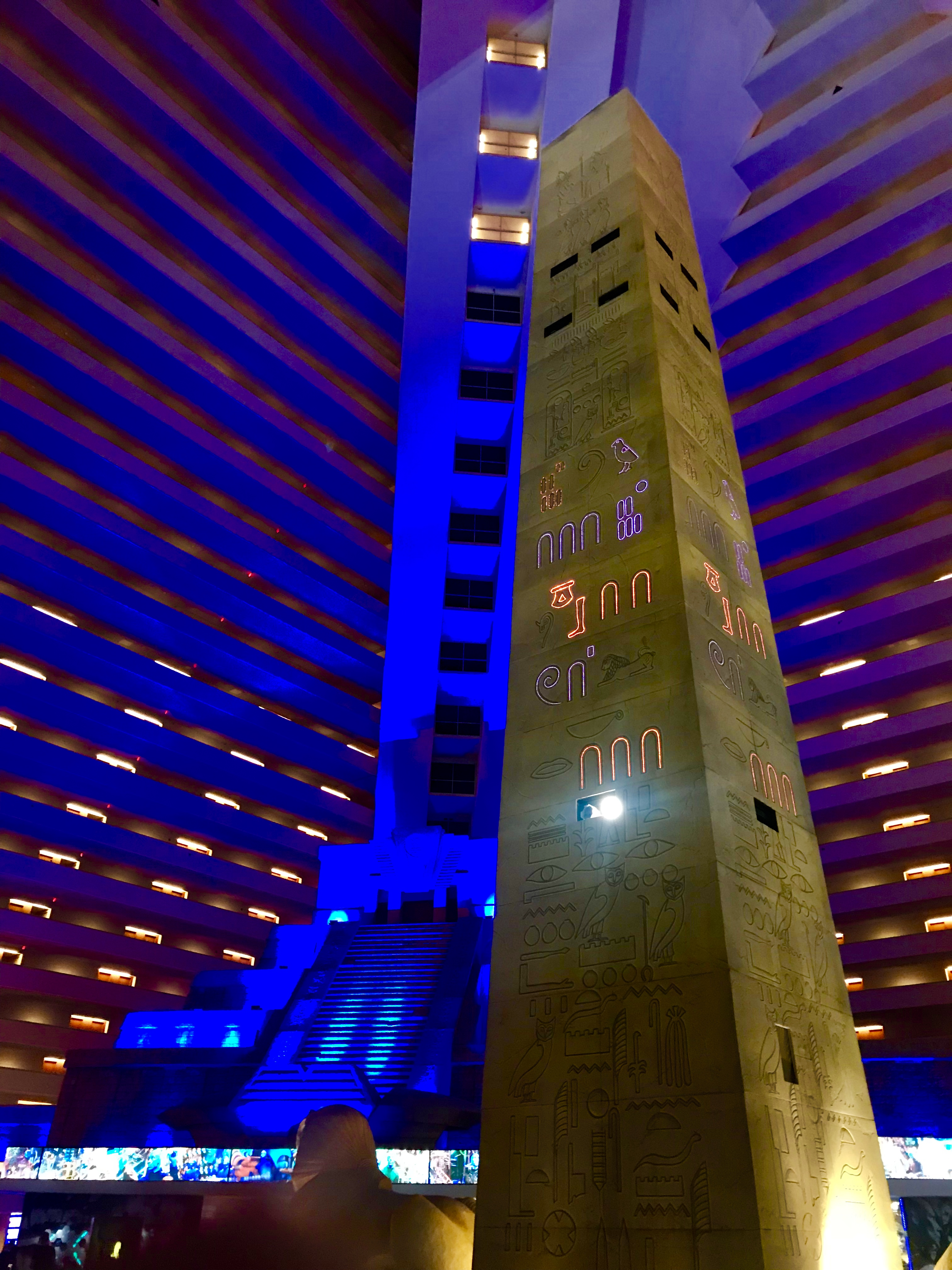

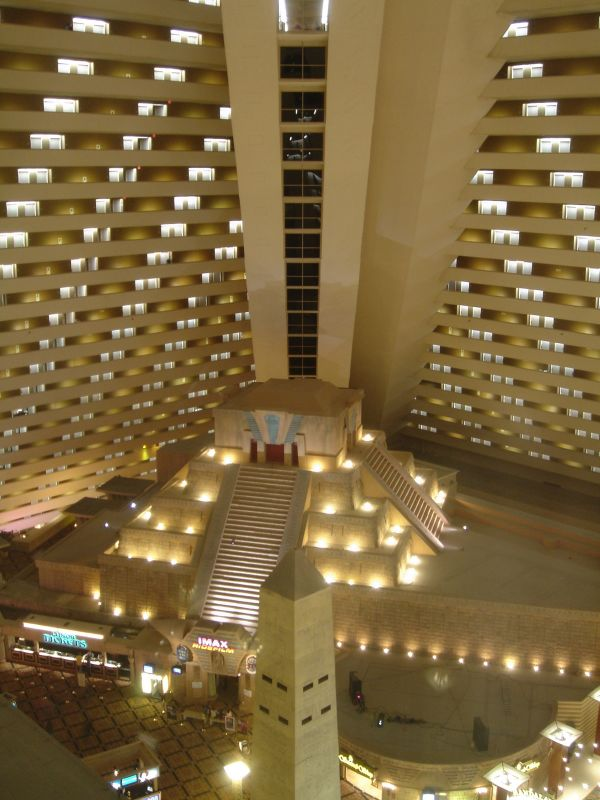

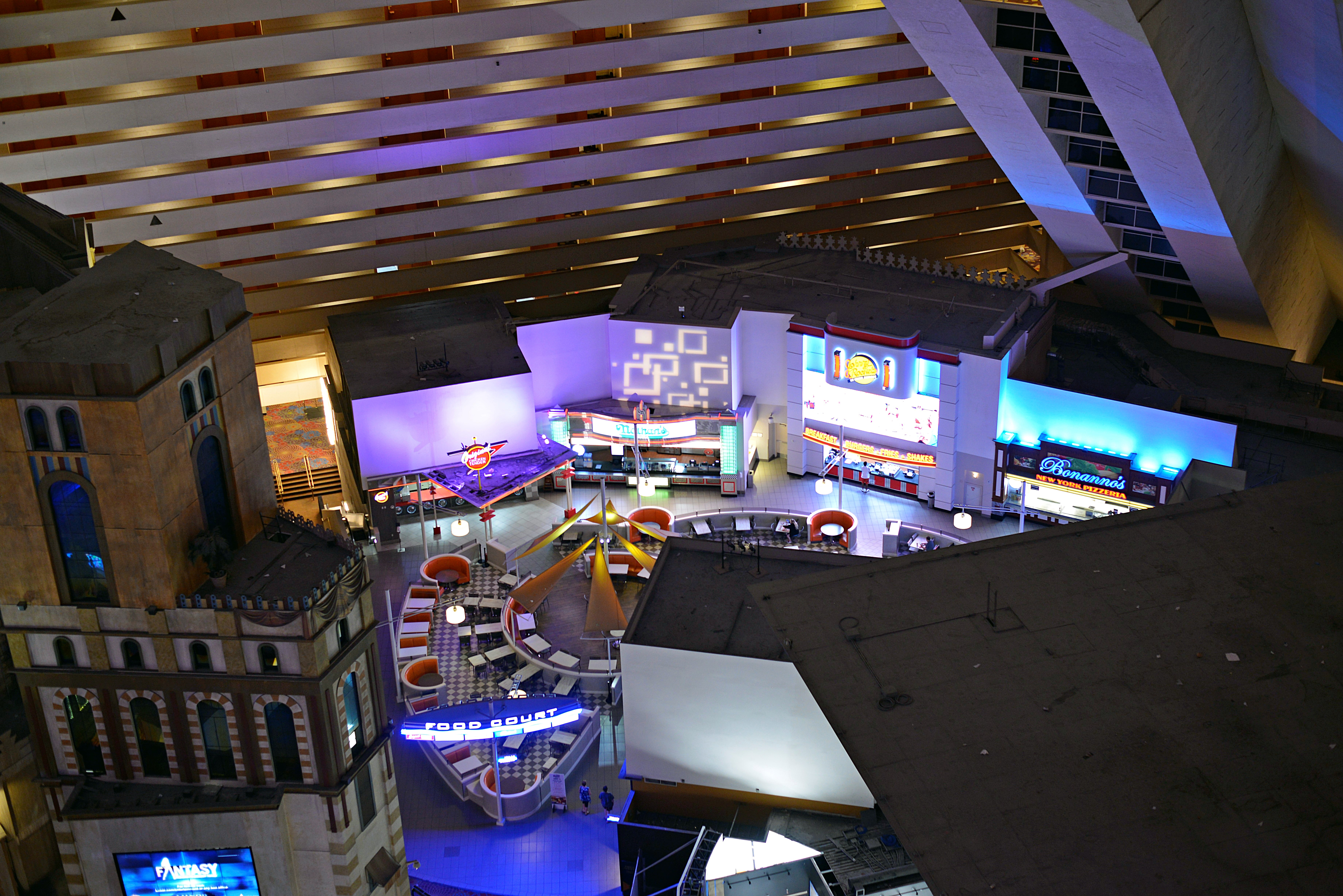

=== Luxor Sky Beam ===
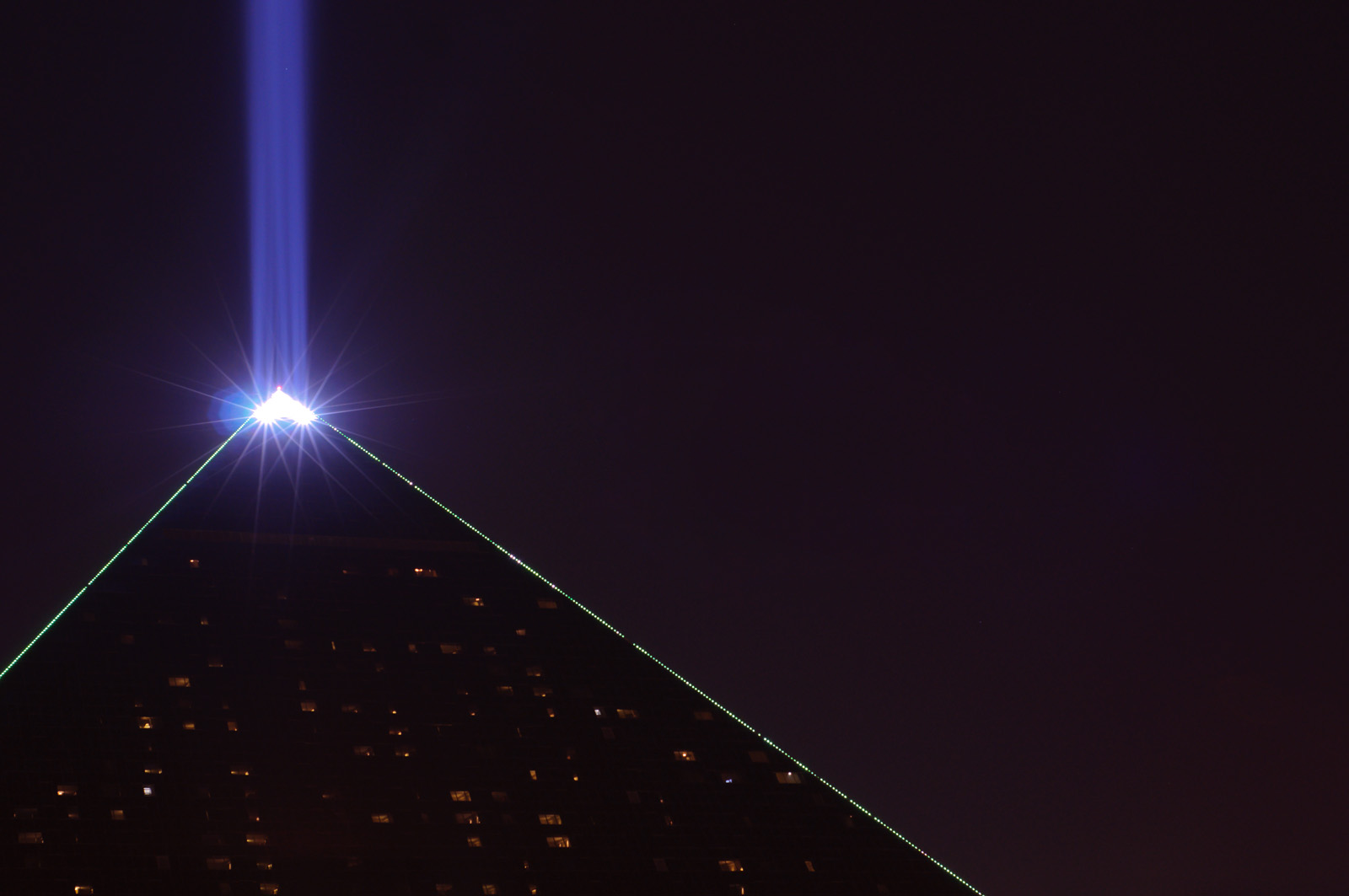
The light beam in 2011

The tip of the pyramid is three stories, and features a beam of light known as the Luxor Sky Beam. It is the most powerful man-made light in the world, using curved mirrors to collect the light from 39 xenon lamps and focus them into one intense, narrow beam. G-Force International Entertainment Corporation was hired to design, build and install the lighting system. Each lamp is 7,000 watts and cost approximately $1,200 as of 2001; at full power, the system costs $51 an hour to operate, with $20 of that going toward electricity.

The beam was activated on the night of October 14, 1993, and has operated reliably since then. On a clear night, it is visible up to 275 miles (443 km) away by aircraft at cruising altitude, such as over Los Angeles. Moths are also attracted to the light, which in turn attracts bats and owls.

The lamp room, located about 50 feet (15 m) below the top of the building, can reach temperatures of 300 °F (150 °C) while the lights are operating. Because of the heat, the room is serviced by two staff members during the day. Temperatures of 500 °F (260 °C) have been recorded five inches (13 cm) above the pyramid tip. The beam originally measured 42.3 billion candela, and shone seven miles (11 km) high. Since 2008, only half the lamps have been lit as a cost- and energy-saving measure. The resort later surveyed tourists about the possibility of turning off the beam completely, an idea that was largely rejected.

=== Other lighting ===
Aside from the sky beam, the pyramid would blend in with the darkness of nightfall, as it initially lacked any other exterior lighting. In 1997, Bee Construction fitted the four outer edges of the pyramid with computer-guided strobe lighting. Four years had been spent researching and developing the $1 million project, and another two months were spent installing it. The project was accompanied by an outdoor sound system, allowing for synchronized light-and-sound shows.

Luxor sued Bee in 2003, alleging that the lighting system contained design and construction flaws which resulted in frequent power shutdowns. The suit further alleged that Bee had failed to honor contracts to repair or replace the system components. New LED lighting was added along the pyramid's exterior edges in 2019. The lights are programmable and feature a variety of colors.

== Attractions ==
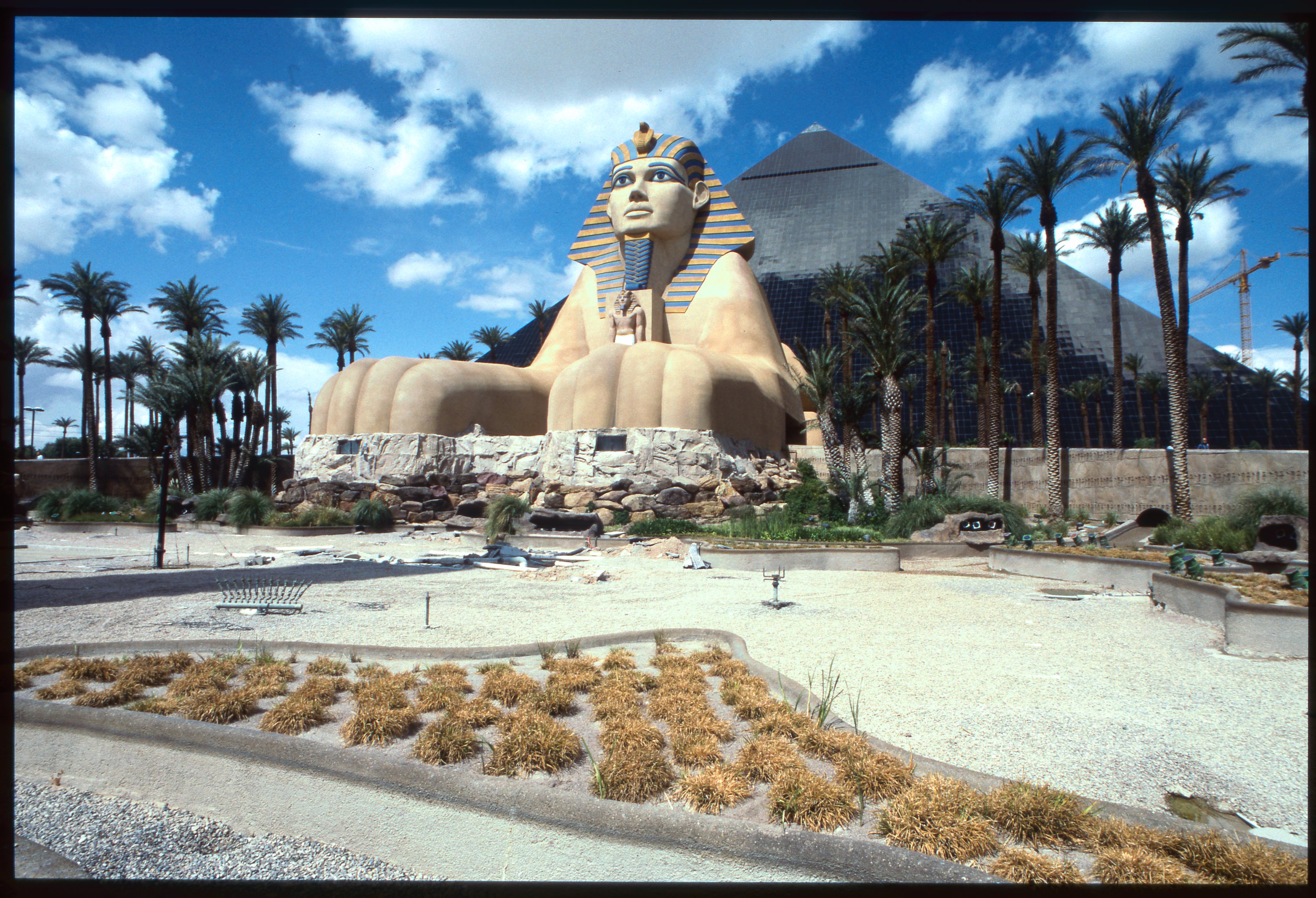
The remnants of Karnak Lake, May 1996

Upon its opening, Luxor included the 300,000-U.S.-gallon (1,100 m^{3}) Karnak Lake, located between the sphinx and obelisk. More than 100 computer-controlled fountains would spray water up from the lake by day, and as part of a free nightly show in which lasers shot out from the eyes of the sphinx. The lasers would project Egyptian imagery onto a 50 foot (15 m) high water screen formed by the fountains. The show was meant, but ultimately failed, to rival a popular Strip attraction, the volcano at the Mirage resort. At the end of 1995, the Federal Aviation Administration ordered a shutdown of all laser light shows within 20 miles (32 km) of McCarran International Airport, putting an end to the Karnak Lake attraction.

At its opening, the resort also featured the indoor Nile River Tour, a paid 15-minute ride that took guests to different parts of the pyramid and past pieces of ancient artwork along a river encircling the casino. The river was 3,000 ft (910 m) long, and was removed after three years.

Secrets of the Luxor Pyramid, created by visual effects supervisor Douglas Trumbull, also debuted with the resort. It consisted of three 15-minute attractions, including "In Search of the Obelisk", "Luxor Live", and "Theater of Time". Each show took place in its own theater, with the final one projected on a seven-story screen. In 1996, the seven-story screen was repurposed as an IMAX theater showcasing various 3D films, the first Nevada venue to do so. Meanwhile, "In Search of the Obelisk" was successful enough to receive nationwide distribution at other IMAX theaters.

A 14,000 sq ft (1,300 m^{2}) indoor playground called Play Playground, for children and adults, opened in 2024. It serves as immersive entertainment, providing various activities such as games and a bounce house. It has since pivoted to only for people 21+

=== Museum and exhibits ===
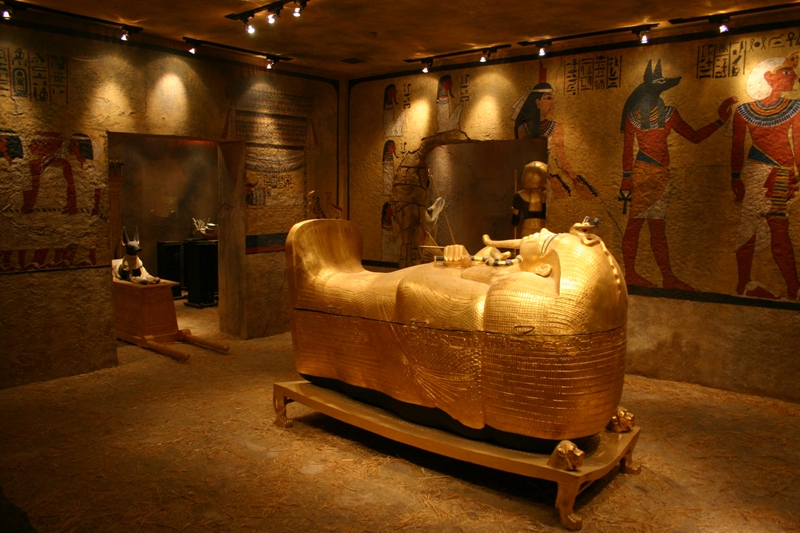
Replica of King Tut's tomb

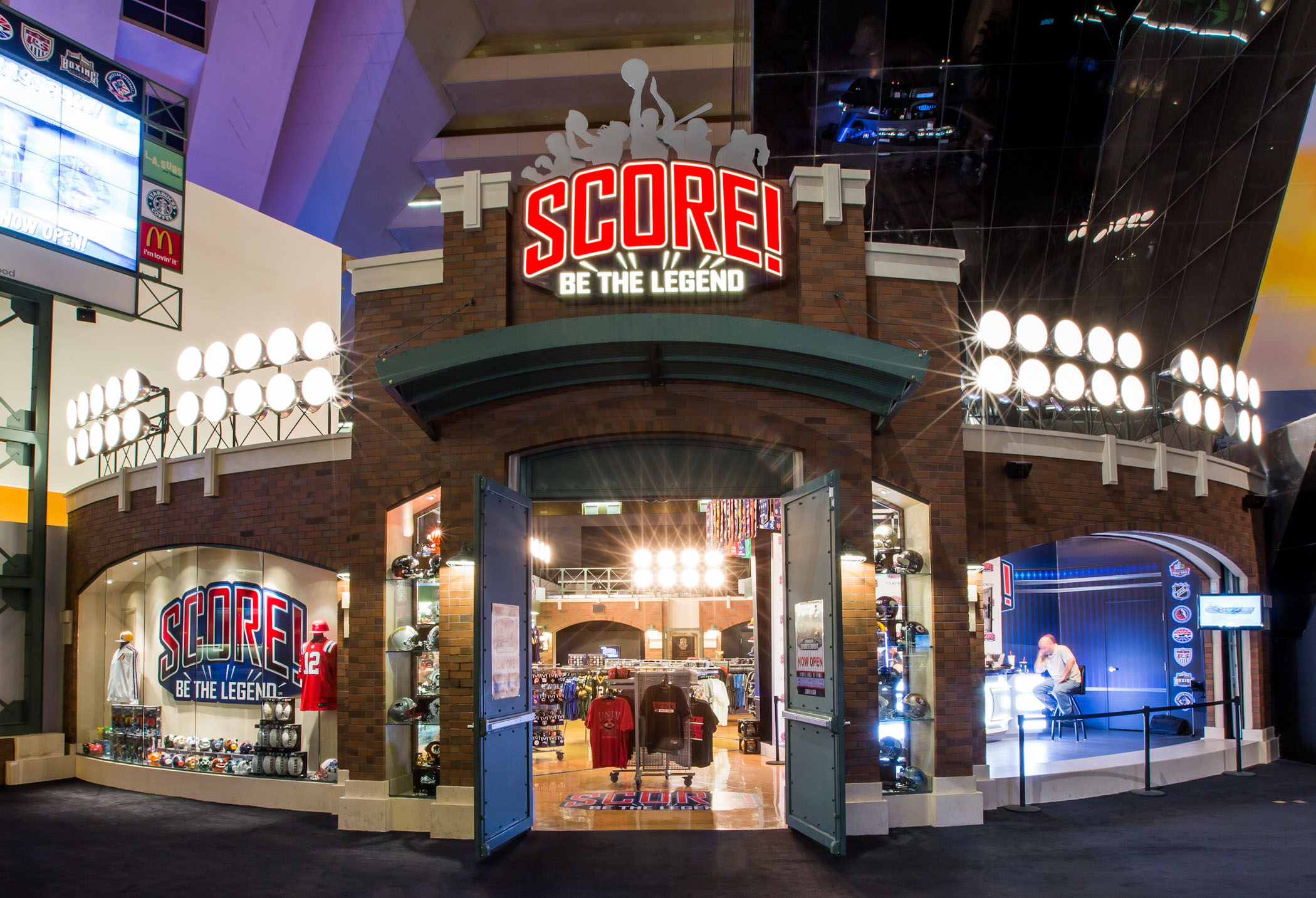
Score! in 2013

King Tut's Tomb and Museum opened at Luxor in December 1993. It consisted of four rooms dedicated to Egyptian history, featuring replicas of various ancient items; these were created for the museum by artists near Cairo, and Egyptologist Zahi Hawass gave his approval of the items before they were put on display. The museum's centerpiece was a replica of King Tutankhamen's tomb, as found in the Valley of the Kings. The replica cost approximately $360,000.

The 12,800 sq ft (1,190 m^{2}) museum closed in June 2008, part of Luxor's efforts to scale back on its Egyptian theming. The replica artifacts were donated to the Las Vegas Natural History Museum, where they are displayed in its "Treasures of Egypt" exhibit, opened in January 2010.

The King Tut museum was replaced by "Titanic: The Artifact Exhibition", featuring various items from the Titanic, including The Big Piece. It opened later in 2008, along with "Bodies: The Exhibition" similar to Bodies: The Exhibition in Tampa, Florida). These had both been at the nearby Tropicana resort, previously; their relocation to the Luxor required the removal of the IMAX theater and a game arcade.

An 8,000 sq ft (740 m^{2}) sports memorabilia exhibit, known as "Score!", opened in 2012. Another exhibit, Discovering King Tut's Tomb, opened in 2022, marking the 100th anniversary of the tomb's discovery.

=== Restaurants and clubs ===
Luxor opened with seven restaurants, and a food court was added in 1997. The following year, Gourmet named Luxor among the top 50 resorts in the U.S., primarily because of its restaurants. Notable eateries around that time included the Luxor Steakhouse, and a French gourmet restaurant known as Isis. It is also home to Diablo's Cantina, a restaurant serving Mexican cuisine on the atrium level.

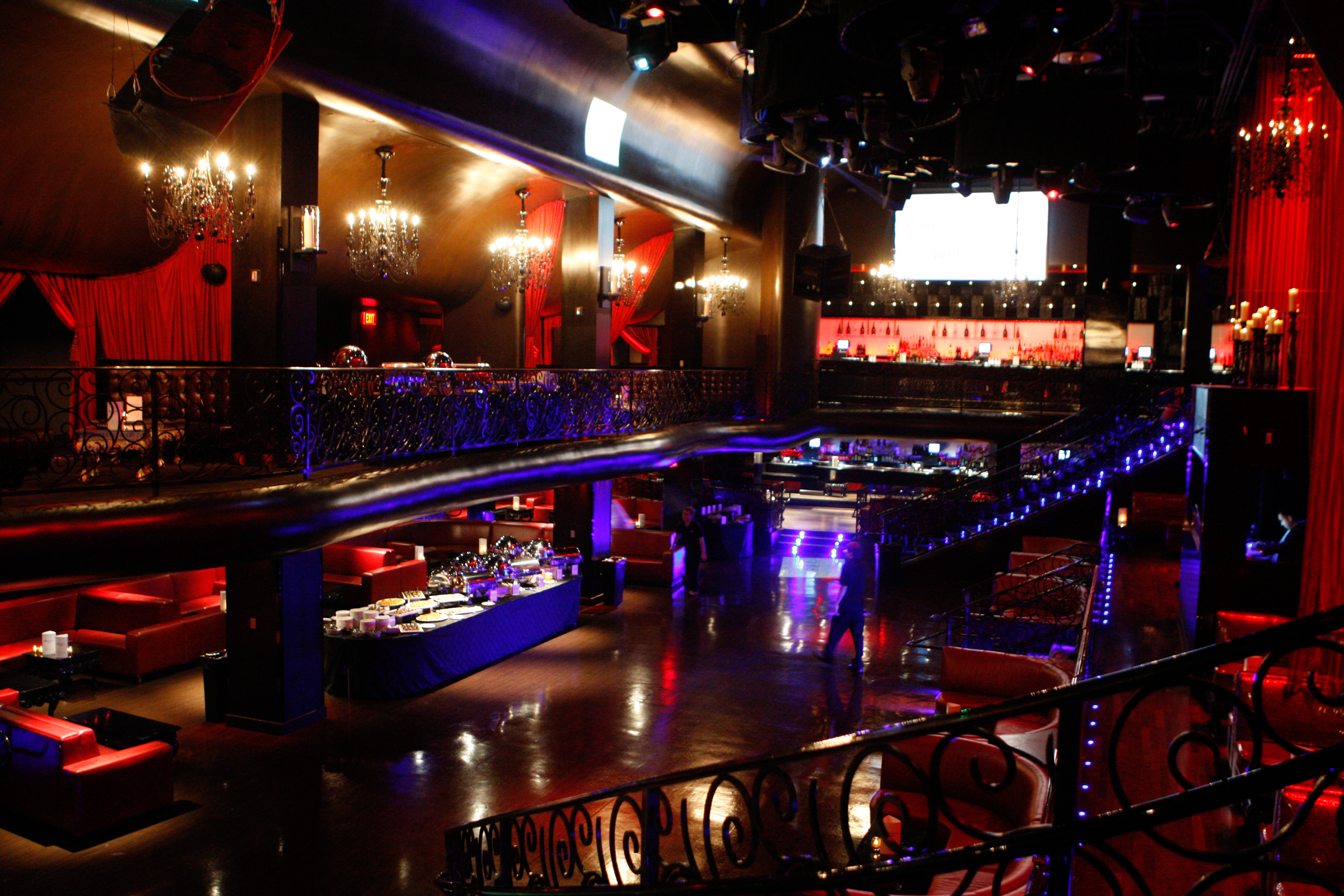
LAX club interior

Company American Bistro opened in 2007, with Nick Lachey, Paris Hilton and Wilmer Valderrama as investors. Isis was also replaced that year by CatHouse, a nightclub and restaurant with Kerry Simon as chef. It was modeled after a 1940s bordello. The restaurant portion closed in 2010, followed by the nightclub two years later. Other notable restaurants have included Tender, specializing in steaks and seafood.

Ra, a bar and nightclub, opened in December 1997. It was named after the Egyptian god of the sun, Ra. It was subsequently turned into the LAX nightclub, which opened in 2007 with a party hosted by Britney Spears. The two-level venue measured 26,000 sq ft (2,400 m^{2}). LAX was popular among celebrities, and included Christina Aguilera and DJ AM as investors. The club proved to be successful, outlasting its original Los Angeles counterpart, before closing in 2017.

=== Video gaming and esports ===
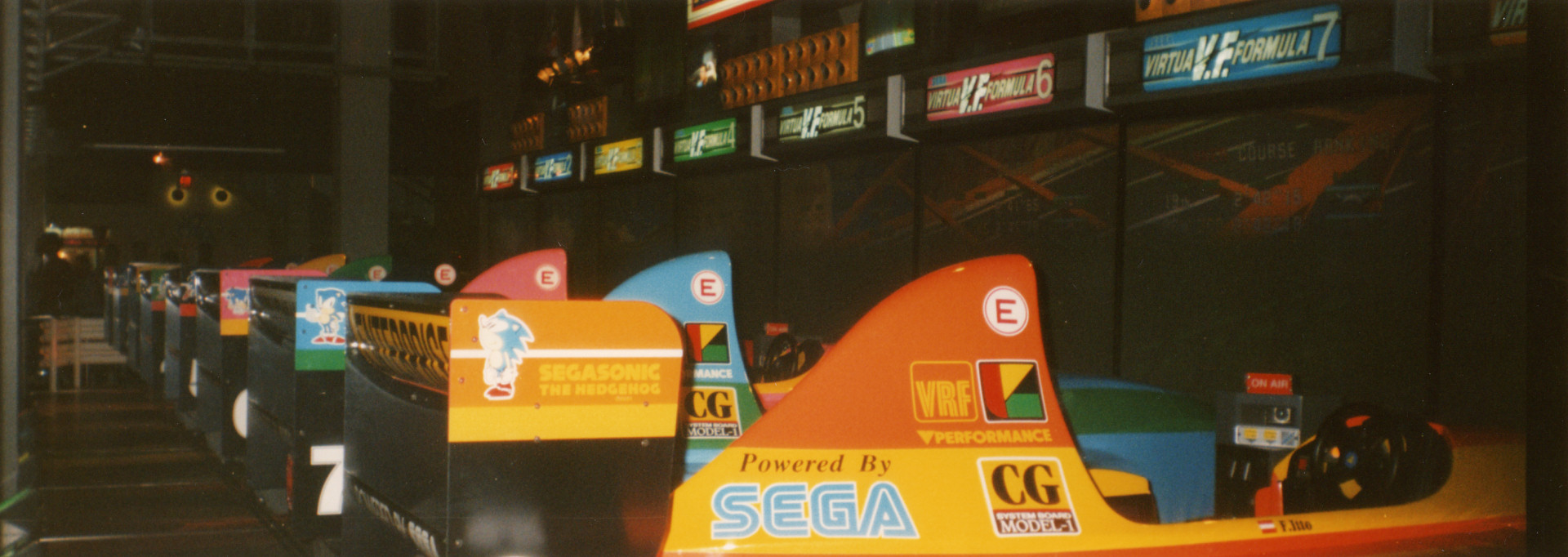
Virtua Formula games at VirtuaLand, 1993

Upon its opening, Luxor included the 18,000 sq ft (1,700 m^{2}) VirtuaLand video game arcade, created by Sega. The arcade later became known as Games of the Gods, before being removed in 2008.

Luxor announced in 2017 that it would close LAX and convert it into an esports facility. Known as Esports Arena and part of an eponymous chain, it opened in March 2018, becoming the first esports venue on the Strip and only the second one in the Las Vegas Valley. The facility was added in an effort to attract the Millennial demographic. It was renamed HyperX Arena at the end of 2018, through a partnership with HyperX. The multi-level venue measures 30,000 sq ft (2,800 m^{2}) and includes a two-story video wall. As of 2023, the HyperX Arena had hosted 700 events and more than 500,000 people since its opening.

== Live entertainment ==
Luxor initially included the 900-seat Pharaoh's Dinner Theater. It hosted The Winds of the Gods, a show centered on a plot to overtake the Egyptian throne. It included chariot races, belly dancers, and a trained elephant. The theater later hosted an ice production known as Le Ice Show. The venue closed in December 1995, making way for convention space.

A 1,200-seat venue was subsequently added. Known as the Luxor Theater, it has since been expanded to 1,500 seats. A production show, titled Imagine, A Theatrical Odyssey, opened in the venue in 1997. The show closed at the end of 1999, with the Blue Man Group taking over the theater. They performed at Luxor until 2005. After a decade of playing at other Strip resorts, the Blue Man Group returned to Luxor in 2015, displacing the dance group Jabbawockeez.

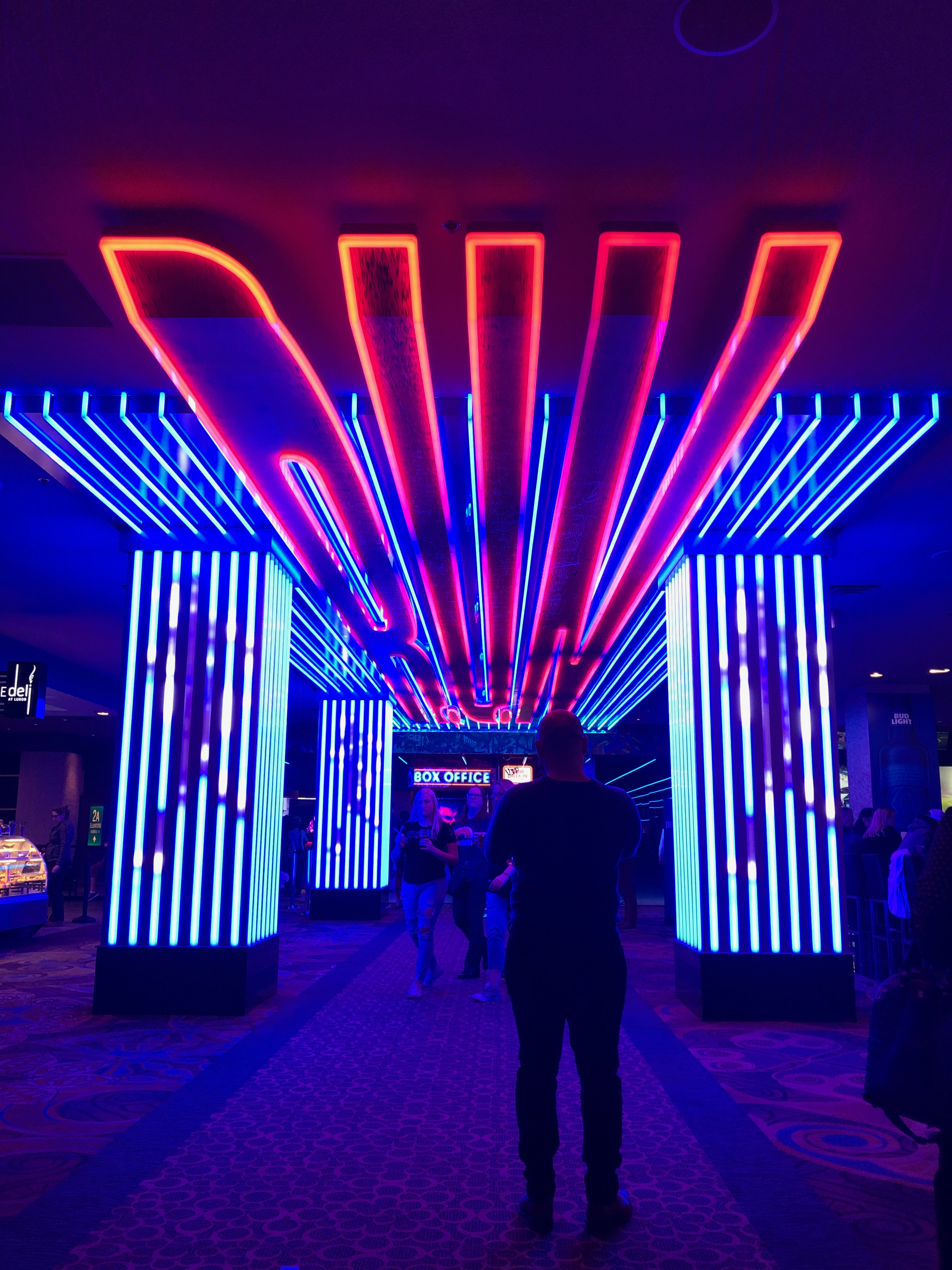
The entrance to R.U.N.

The Broadway musical Hairspray opened in February 2006, replacing the Blue Man Group. Like most Broadway-to-Vegas shows, Hairspray was shortened from its original version for a new runtime of 90 minutes. The show experienced poor ticket sales and closed four months later.

Magician Criss Angel partnered with Cirque du Soleil to open a show at Luxor, titled Believe. It debuted in 2008, and was the first Cirque show to feature an individual star. The show initially received criticism, prompting Cirque to give Angel more creative control and fine-tune it. Believe ran until 2016, when Angel and Cirque debuted a new show at Luxor known as Mindfreak Live!, based on his television series Criss Angel Mindfreak (2005–2010). Angel ended his run at Luxor in 2018, after 10 years of performances there.

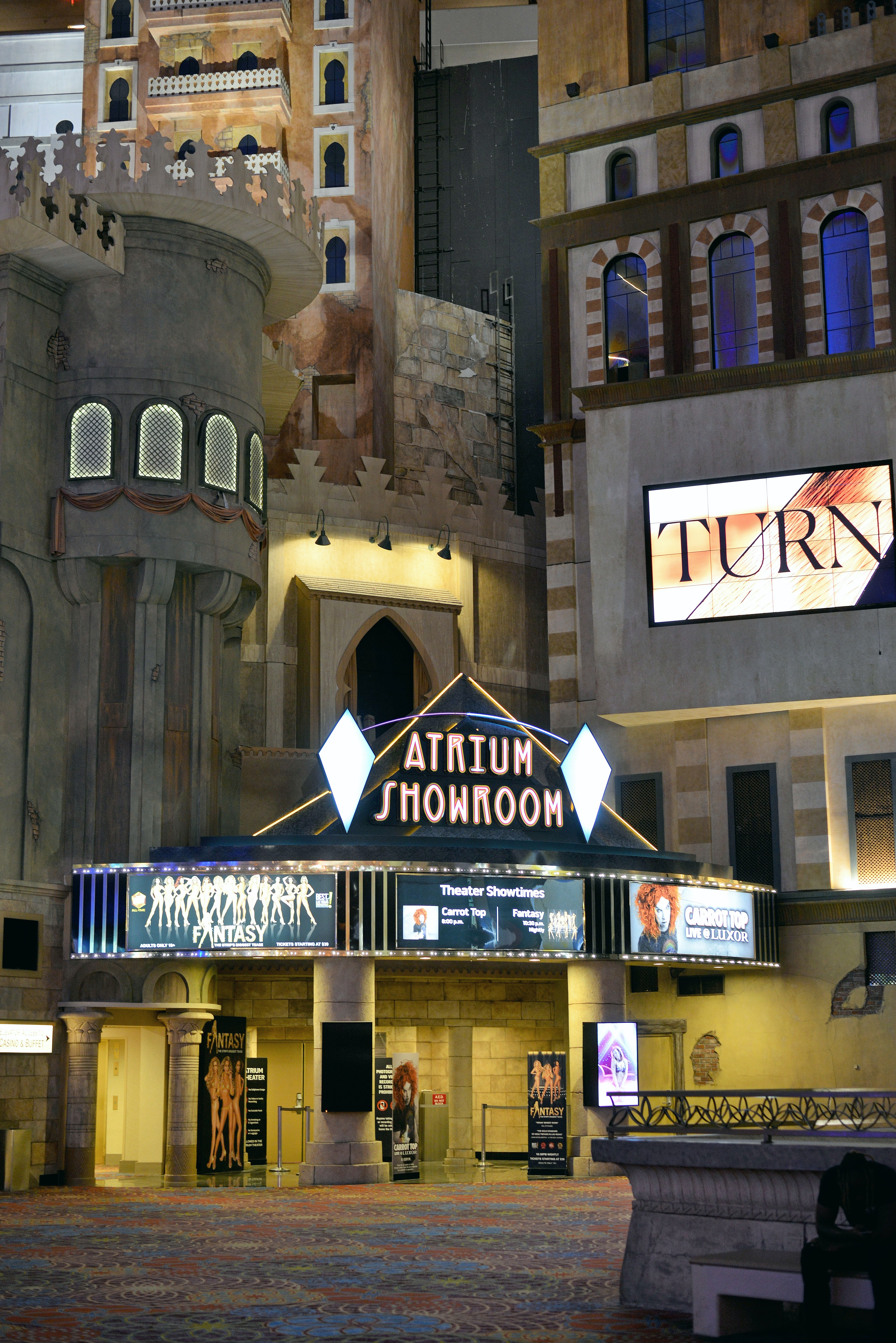
The Atrium Showroom

In October 2019, Cirque debuted a new show known as R.U.N, described as bringing an action movie to life for its audience. The show took over and renovated the theater previously used by Angel. In a departure from previous Cirque shows, R.U.N lacked any acrobatic acts and featured rock and roll music, as well as stunts such as motorcycle jumps and pyrotechnics. The show was written by Robert Rodriguez, with music composed by Tyler Bates. R.U.N received mixed reviews and poor ticket sales, and it lacked the time and funds needed to make improvements, closing after four months.

In 2021, Luxor debuted a variety show featuring acts from the television program America's Got Talent. Originally titled America's Got Talent Las Vegas Live, the show was a collaboration between MGM, Syco Entertainment, and Fremantle. In 2023, the show was retitled America's Got Talent Presents Superstars Live, and it surpassed 500 performances.

Aside from its main theater, Luxor also includes the 350-seat Atrium Showroom. Midnight Fantasy, a topless show, debuted there in 1999. It was created and is produced by Anita Mann, and the title has since been shortened to Fantasy. Comedian Carrot Top has shared the Atrium Showroom with Fantasy since 2005, when he signed on for what was originally a three-year residency. In 2023, his contract at the resort was extended until 2030.

== In popular culture ==
Luxor is often viewed as a prime example of 1990s Postmodern architecture, and its sphinx appeared on the cover of architecture scholar James Steele's book Architecture Today. The resort has appeared in numerous films, including Showgirls (1995), Synthetic Pleasures (1996), and Mars Attacks! (1996). In Up in the Air (2009), main character Ryan Bingham is asked to take a picture in front of Luxor. A futuristic, abandoned version of the pyramid is seen in Blade Runner 2049 (2017), along with other famous landmarks in a post-apocalyptic Las Vegas.

Will Smith filmed the music video for "Gettin' Jiggy wit It" (1998) in the hotel's lobby and in front of its sphinx. The resort was also featured in the television shows Fear Factor, Criss Angel Mindfreak, and CSI. A replica of Luxor, named "The Camel's Toe", appeared in the Las Venturas area of the video game Grand Theft Auto: San Andreas (2004). The video game Call of Duty: Ghosts (2013) also features a mission set in Las Vegas, which includes an Egyptian-themed casino inspired by Luxor. An Egyptian-themed nightclub appears in the Phantom Liberty (2023) expansion pack for the video game Cyberpunk 2077 (2020) that is inspired by Luxor. The Luxor was also used in several scenes of the German mini TV series "Kalifornisches Quartett" with Susanne Uhlen.

== See also ==
- Luxor
- Cathedral of light
- spectra (installation)
- A Symphony of Lights
- Tribute in Light
- List of tallest pyramids
- List of largest hotels
- List of integrated resorts
